= Anthene inferna =

Scientific classification
- Kingdom: Animalia
- Phylum: Arthropoda
- Class: Insecta
- Order: Lepidoptera
- Family: Lycaenidae
- Genus: Anthene
- Species: A. inferna

Binomial name
- Anthene inferna (Bethune-Baker, 1926)

Synonyms
- Triclema inferna Bethune-Baker, 1926; Anthene (Triclema) inferna

Species of butterfly

Anthene inferna is a butterfly in the family Lycaenidae. It is found in Cameroon.
