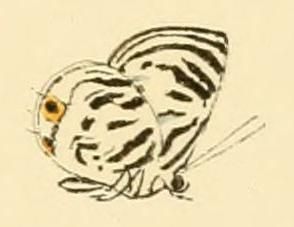

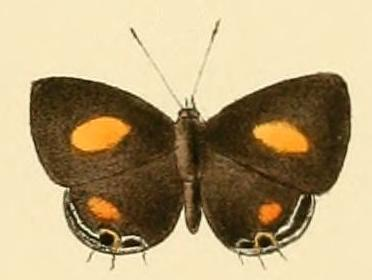

Scientific classification
- Kingdom: Animalia
- Phylum: Arthropoda
- Clade: Pancrustacea
- Class: Insecta
- Order: Lepidoptera
- Family: Lycaenidae
- Genus: Neurellipes
- Species: N. lachares

Binomial name
- Neurellipes lachares (Hewitson, 1878)

Synonyms
- Lycaenesthes lachares Hewitson, 1878; Anthene (Anthene) lachares; Lycaenesthes pulcher Grose-Smith and Kirby, 1893; Lycaenesthes liparis Grose-Smith, 1898; Lycaenesthes lachares var. obsolescens Bethune-Baker, 1910; Pseudoliptena bitje Stempffer, 1946

= Neurellipes lachares =

Silky ciliate blue

Species of butterfly

Neurellipes lachares, previously Anthene lachares the silky ciliate blue, is a butterfly in the family Lycaenidae. It is found in Sierra Leone, Liberia, Ivory Coast, Ghana, Nigeria, Cameroon, Gabon, the Republic of the Congo, the Central African Republic, Angola, the Democratic Republic of the Congo and Uganda. The habitat consists of primary forests and dense secondary forests.

Adult males mud-puddle.

== Subspecies ==
- Neurellipes lachares lachares (Sierra Leone, Liberia, Ivory Coast, Ghana, Nigeria: south and Cross River loop, Cameroon, Gabon, Congo, Central African Republic, Angola, western Democratic Republic of the Congo)
- Neurellipes lachares toroensis Stempffer, 1947 (Central African Republic: Bangui, Democratic Republic of the Congo: east to Ituri, western Uganda)

Torben Larsen developed a species numbering system for his 2005 publication Butterflies of West Africa. The nominate subspecies, described as Anthene lachares is #525. The 'Larsen' numbers have since been used with permission in A Sharp Eye on Butterflies of Ghana.
