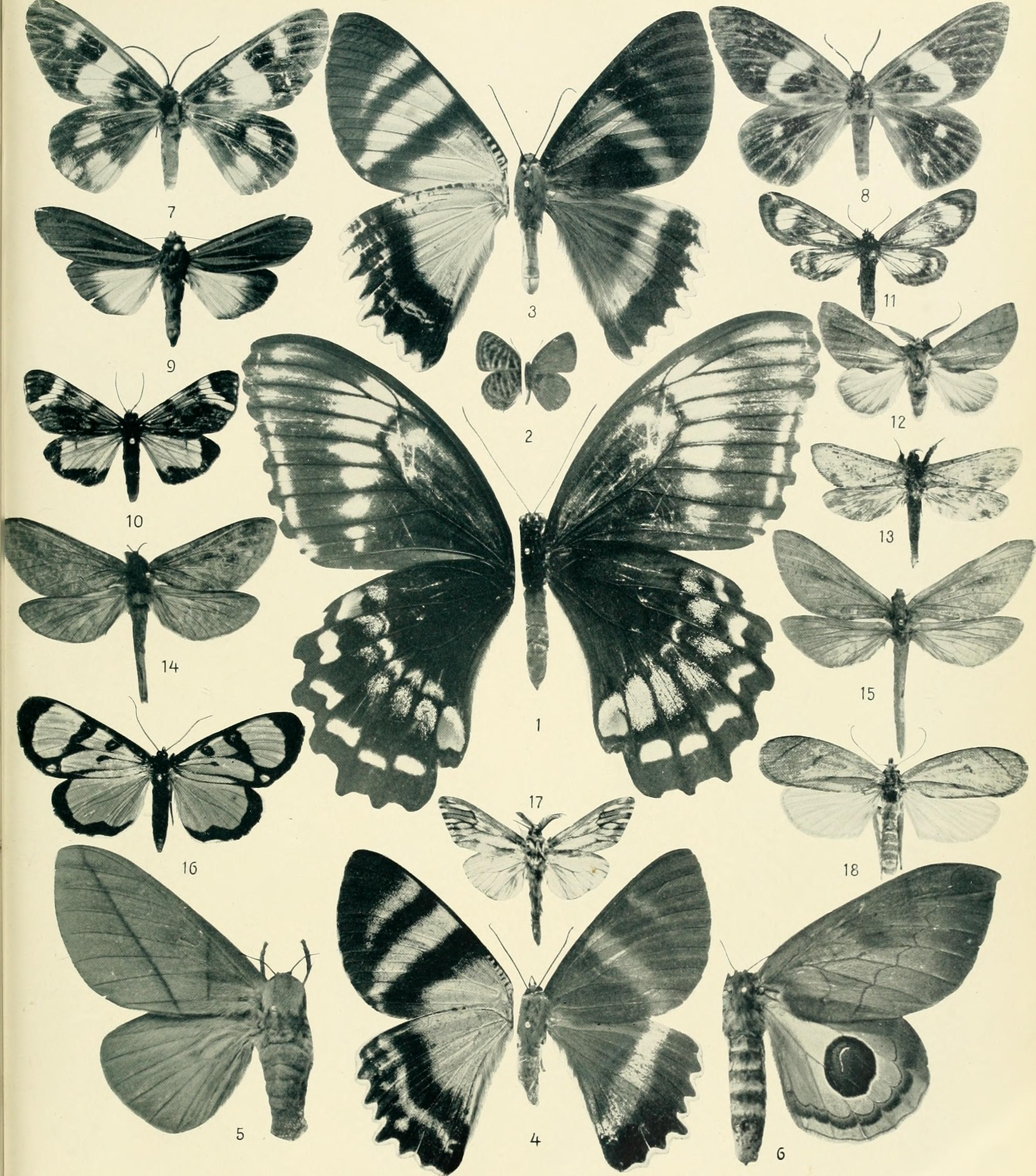
- Figure 2

Scientific classification
- Kingdom: Animalia
- Phylum: Arthropoda
- Class: Insecta
- Order: Lepidoptera
- Family: Lycaenidae
- Genus: Anthene
- Species: A. leptala

Binomial name
- Anthene leptala (Courvoisier, 1914)

Synonyms
- Lycaenesthes leptala Courvoisier, 1914; Anthene (Anthene) leptala

= Anthene leptala =

Species of butterfly

Anthene leptala is a butterfly in the family Lycaenidae. It is found in Tanzania.
