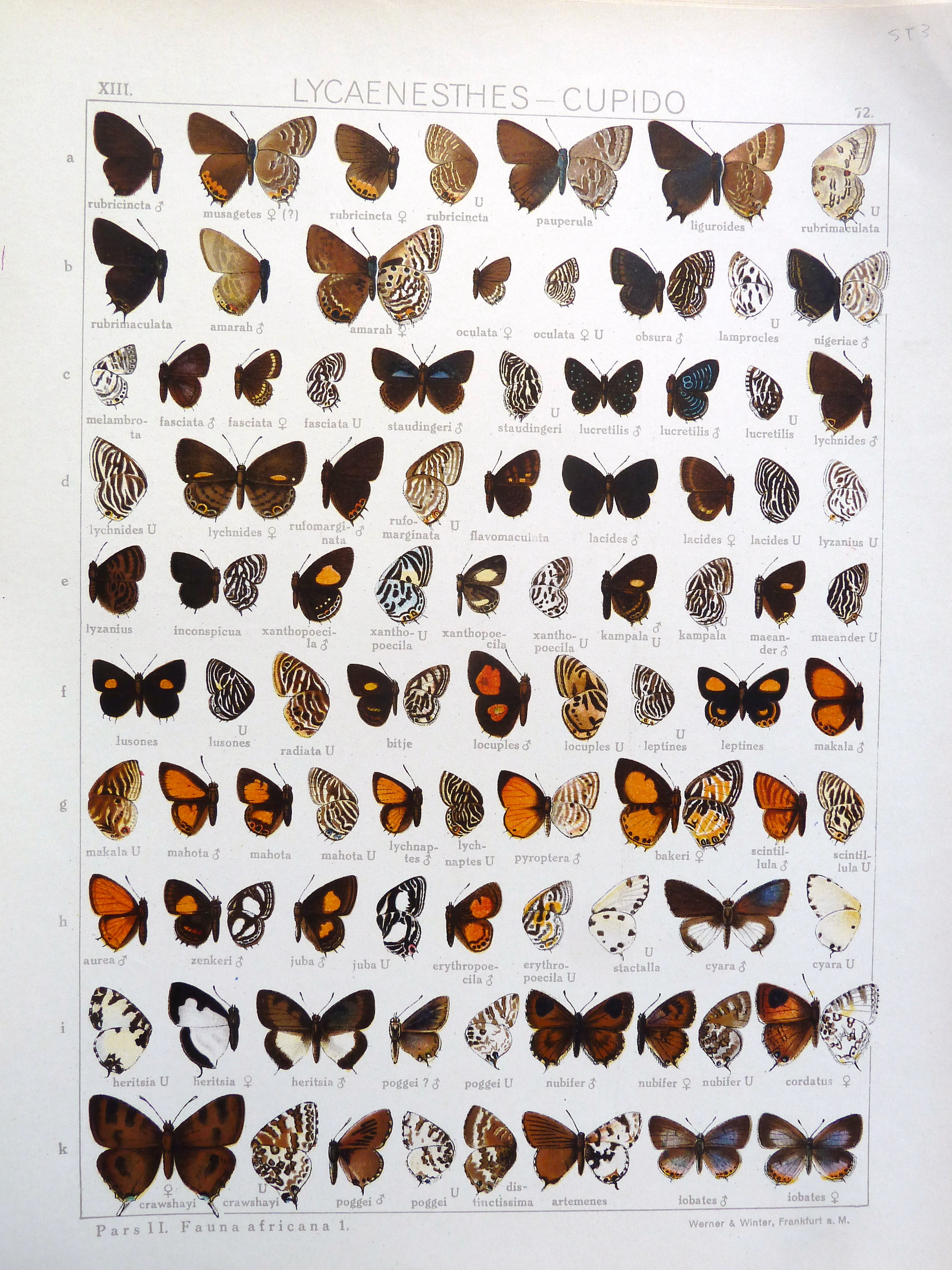
- g

Scientific classification
- Domain: Eukaryota
- Kingdom: Animalia
- Phylum: Arthropoda
- Class: Insecta
- Order: Lepidoptera
- Family: Lycaenidae
- Genus: Anthene
- Species: A. lychnaptes

Binomial name
- Anthene lychnaptes (Holland, 1891)

Synonyms
- Lycaenesthes lychnaptes Holland, 1891; Anthene (Anthene) lychnaptes; Lycaenesthes lychnoptera Grose-Smith and Kirby, 1893

= Anthene lychnaptes =

Species of butterfly

Anthene lychnaptes is a butterfly in the family Lycaenidae. It is found in Gabon.
