= Anthene discimacula =

Scientific classification
- Kingdom: Animalia
- Phylum: Arthropoda
- Class: Insecta
- Order: Lepidoptera
- Family: Lycaenidae
- Genus: Anthene
- Species: A. discimacula

Binomial name
- Anthene discimacula (Joicey & Talbot, 1921)

Synonyms
- Lycaenesthes discimacula Joicey & Talbot, 1921; Anthene (Anthene) discimacula

Species of butterfly

Anthene discimacula is a butterfly in the family Lycaenidae. It is found in the Democratic Republic of the Congo (Ituri, Tshopo and Sankuru).
