= Anthene fulvus =

Red forewing

Conservation status
- Least Concern (IUCN 3.1)

Scientific classification
- Kingdom: Animalia
- Phylum: Arthropoda
- Class: Insecta
- Order: Lepidoptera
- Family: Lycaenidae
- Genus: Anthene
- Species: A. fulvus

Binomial name
- Anthene fulvus Stempffer, 1962

Synonyms
- Anthene (Neurellipes) fulvus

Species of butterfly

Anthene fulvus, the red forewing, is a butterfly in the family Lycaenidae. It is found in Ivory Coast, Ghana, Nigeria (south and the Cross River loop) and western Cameroon. The habitat consists of wet forests.
