= Anthene schoutedeni =

Scientific classification
- Domain: Eukaryota
- Kingdom: Animalia
- Phylum: Arthropoda
- Class: Insecta
- Order: Lepidoptera
- Family: Lycaenidae
- Genus: Anthene
- Species: A. schoutedeni

Binomial name
- Anthene schoutedeni (Hulstaert, 1924)

Synonyms
- Lycaenesthes schoutedeni Hulstaert, 1924; Anthene (Anthene) schoutedeni

Species of butterfly

Anthene schoutedeni, the Schouteden's hairtail or Schouteden's indigo ciliate blue, is a butterfly in the family Lycaenidae. It is found in Sierra Leone, the east-central part of the Democratic Republic of the Congo, Ethiopia, Uganda, Rwanda, Burundi, Kenya and north-western Tanzania. The habitat consists of forests.
