= Anthene coerulea =

Mauve ciliate blue

Scientific classification
- Domain: Eukaryota
- Kingdom: Animalia
- Phylum: Arthropoda
- Class: Insecta
- Order: Lepidoptera
- Family: Lycaenidae
- Genus: Anthene
- Species: A. coerulea

Binomial name
- Anthene coerulea (Aurivillius, 1895)

Synonyms
- Lycaenesthes (Triclema) coerulea Aurivillius, 1895; Anthene (Triclema) coerulea

Species of butterfly

Anthene coerulea, the mauve ciliate blue, is a butterfly in the family Lycaenidae. It is found in eastern Nigeria and western Cameroon.
