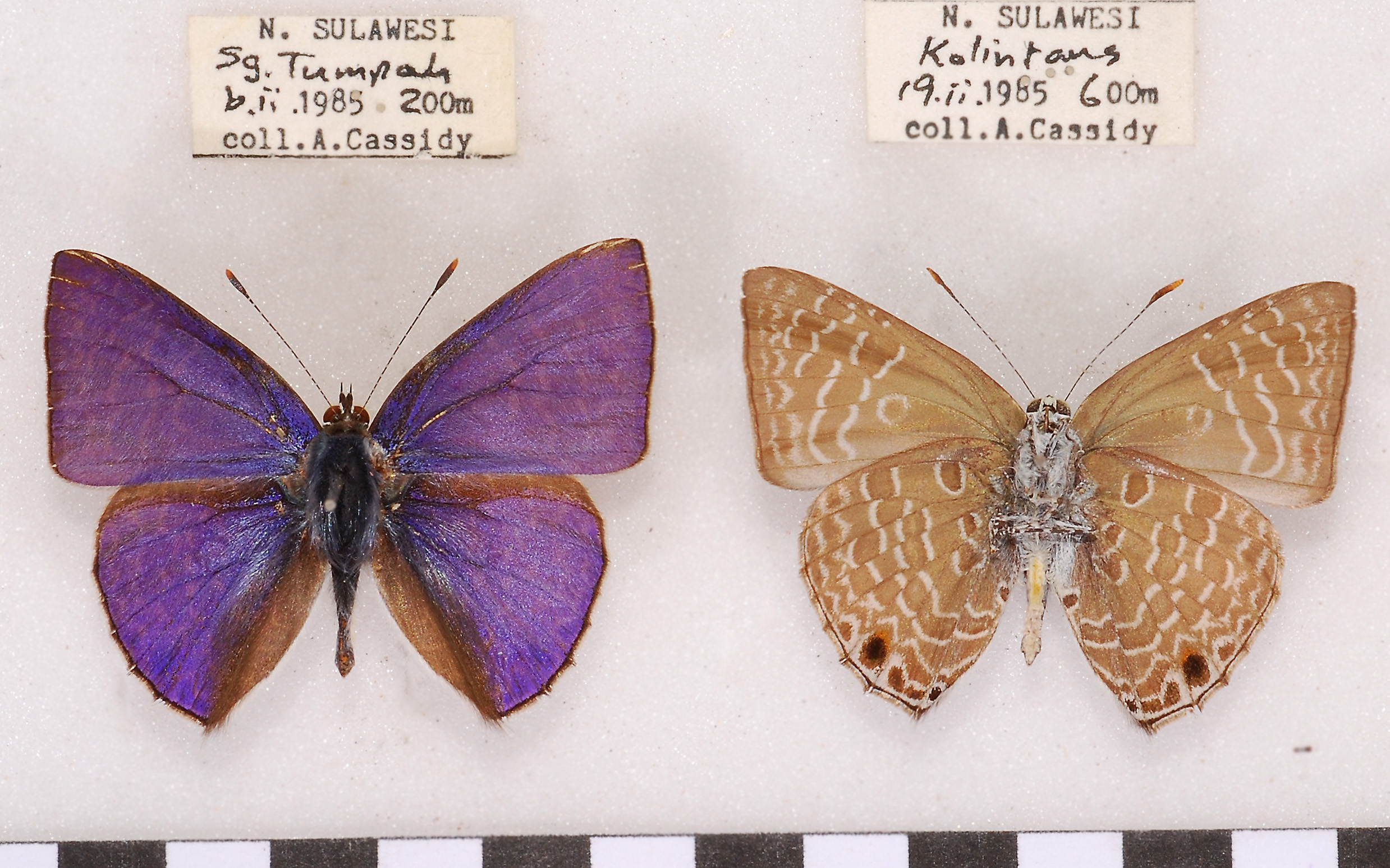

Scientific classification
- Kingdom: Animalia
- Phylum: Arthropoda
- Class: Insecta
- Order: Lepidoptera
- Family: Lycaenidae
- Genus: Anthene
- Species: A. villosa

Binomial name
- Anthene villosa (Snellen, 1878)

Synonyms
- Pseudodipsas villosa Snellen, 1878

= Anthene villosa =

Species of butterfly

Anthene villosa is a butterfly in the family Lycaenidae. It is found on Sulawesi, the Talaud Islands and the Sangir Archipelago.
