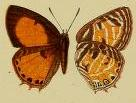

Scientific classification
- Kingdom: Animalia
- Phylum: Arthropoda
- Class: Insecta
- Order: Lepidoptera
- Family: Lycaenidae
- Genus: Anthene
- Species: A. bakeri

Binomial name
- Anthene bakeri (H. H. Druce, 1910)

Synonyms
- Lycaenesthes bakeri H. H. Druce, 1910; Anthene (Anthene) bakeri; Lycaenesthes ja Bethune-Baker, 1910

= Anthene bakeri =

Species of butterfly

Anthene bakeri is a butterfly in the family Lycaenidae first described by Hamilton Herbert Druce in 1910. It is found in the Democratic Republic of the Congo.
