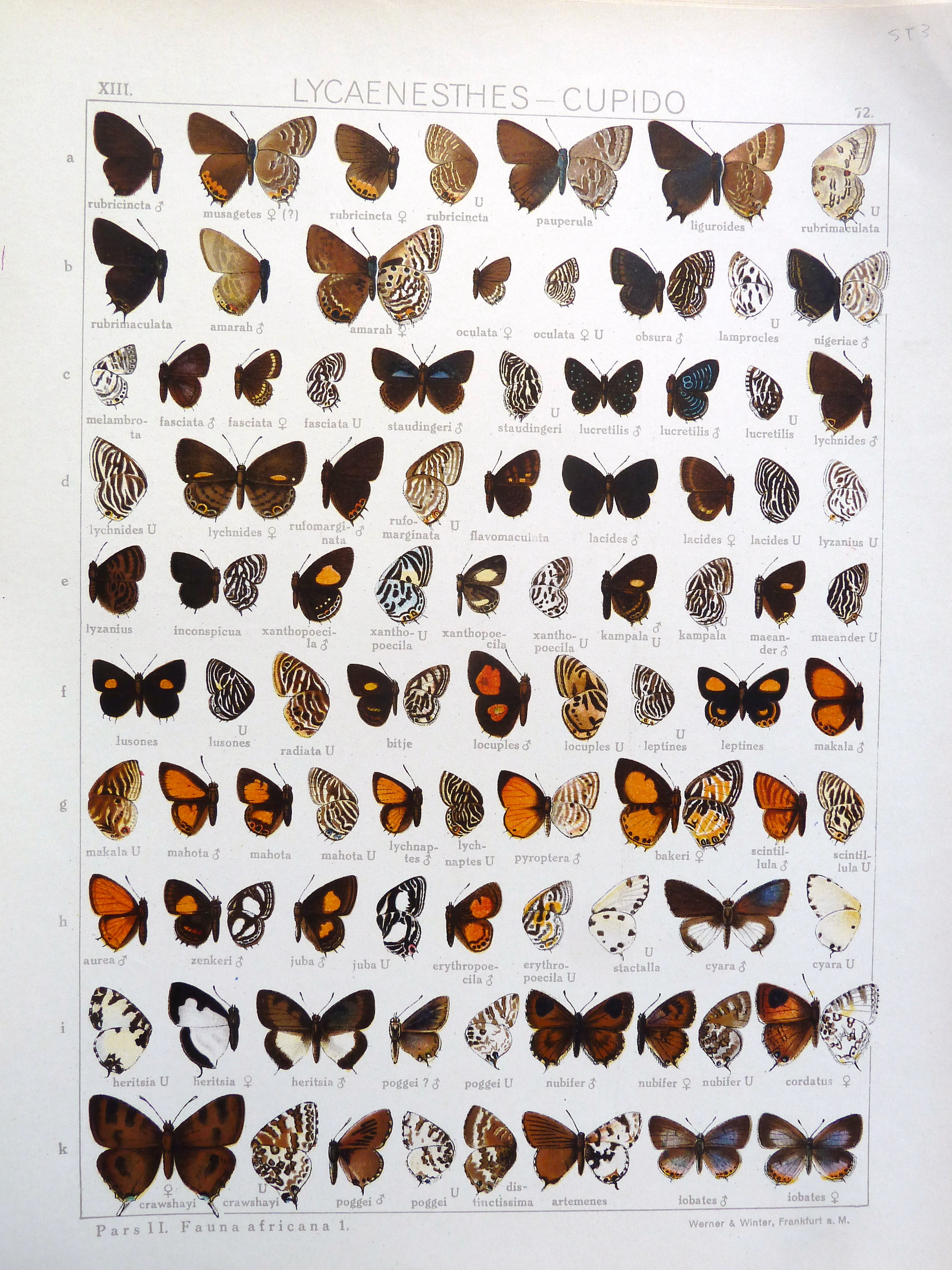
- d

Scientific classification
- Kingdom: Animalia
- Phylum: Arthropoda
- Class: Insecta
- Order: Lepidoptera
- Family: Lycaenidae
- Genus: Anthene
- Species: A. rufomarginata

Binomial name
- Anthene rufomarginata (Bethune-Baker, 1910)

Synonyms
- Lycaenesthes rufomarginata Bethune-Baker, 1910; Anthene (Anthene) rufomarginata

= Anthene rufomarginata =

Species of butterfly

Anthene rufomarginata is a butterfly in the family Lycaenidae. It is found in the Democratic Republic of the Congo (Ituri and north-eastern Tshopo).
