= Anthene madibirensis =

Scientific classification
- Kingdom: Animalia
- Phylum: Arthropoda
- Class: Insecta
- Order: Lepidoptera
- Family: Lycaenidae
- Genus: Anthene
- Species: A. madibirensis

Binomial name
- Anthene madibirensis (Wichgraf, 1921)

Synonyms
- Lycaenesthes madibirensis Wichgraf, 1921; Anthene (Anthene) madibirensis

Species of butterfly

Anthene madibirensis is a butterfly in the family Lycaenidae. It is found in Tanzania (the Madibira district).
