= Anthene ruwenzoricus =

Scientific classification
- Domain: Eukaryota
- Kingdom: Animalia
- Phylum: Arthropoda
- Class: Insecta
- Order: Lepidoptera
- Family: Lycaenidae
- Genus: Anthene
- Species: A. ruwenzoricus

Binomial name
- Anthene ruwenzoricus (Grünberg, 1911)

Synonyms
- Lycaenesthes ruwenzoricus Grünberg, 1911; Anthene (Anthene) ruwenzoricus

Species of butterfly

Anthene ruwenzoricus is a butterfly in the family Lycaenidae. It is found in the border region of the Democratic Republic of the Congo and Uganda.
