= Anthene lycaenolus =

Scientific classification
- Kingdom: Animalia
- Phylum: Arthropoda
- Class: Insecta
- Order: Lepidoptera
- Family: Lycaenidae
- Genus: Anthene
- Species: A. lycaenolus

Binomial name
- Anthene lycaenolus Tite, 1966

Species of butterfly

Anthene lycaenolus is a butterfly in the family Lycaenidae. It is found on the Talaud Islands in Indonesia.
