= Anthene obscura =

Obscure ciliate blue

Scientific classification
- Domain: Eukaryota
- Kingdom: Animalia
- Phylum: Arthropoda
- Class: Insecta
- Order: Lepidoptera
- Family: Lycaenidae
- Genus: Anthene
- Species: A. obscura

Binomial name
- Anthene obscura (H. H. Druce, 1910)

Synonyms
- Triclema obscura H. H. Druce, 1910; Anthene (Triclema) obscura

Species of butterfly

Anthene obscura, the obscure ciliate blue, is a butterfly in the family Lycaenidae. The species was first described by Hamilton Herbert Druce in 1910. It is found in Ghana (the Volta Region), Nigeria (west and the Cross River loop), Cameroon, Gabon and the Democratic Republic of the Congo (Uele, Sankuru and Lualaba). The habitat consists of forests.
