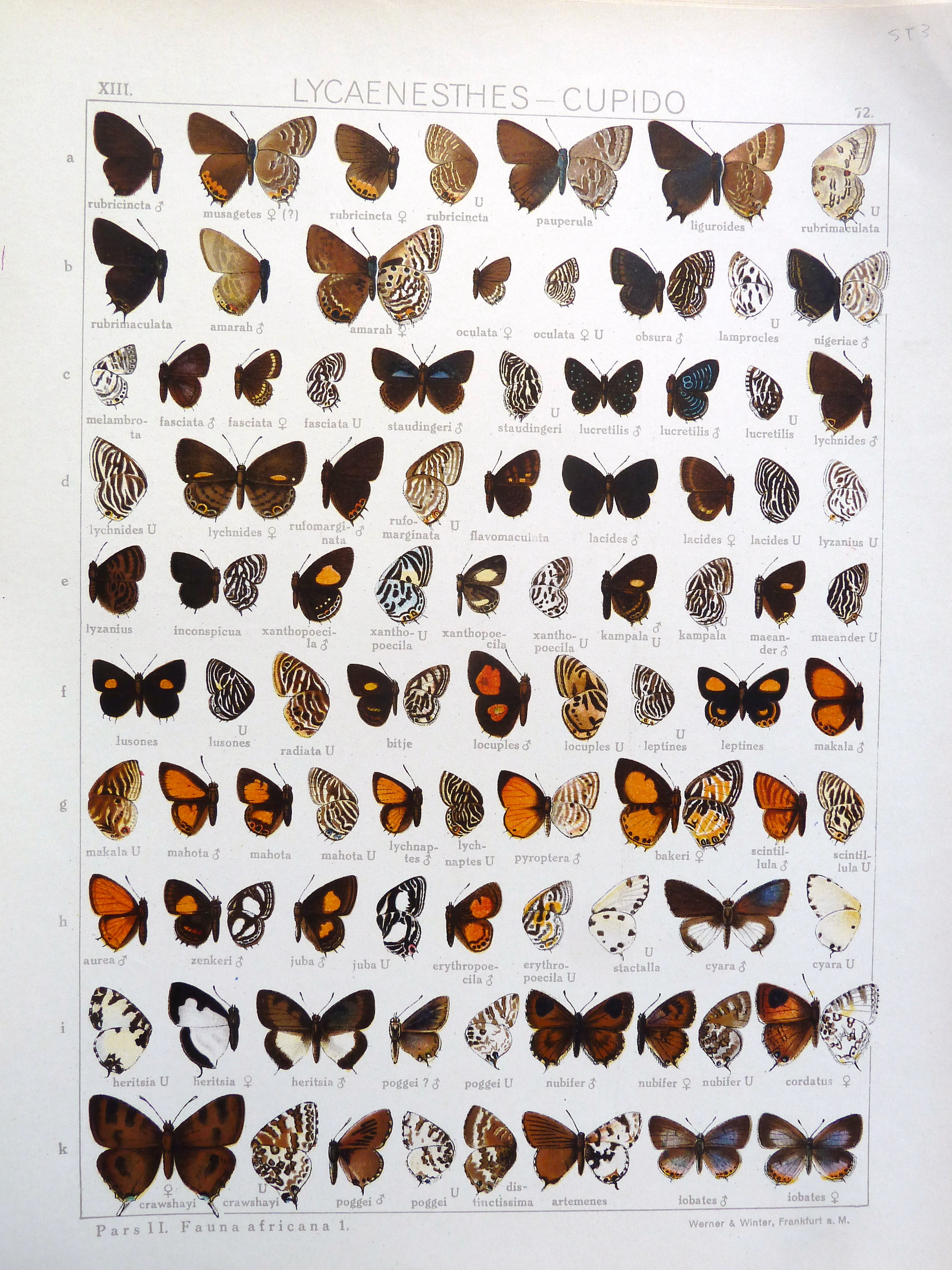
- c

Scientific classification
- Domain: Eukaryota
- Kingdom: Animalia
- Phylum: Arthropoda
- Class: Insecta
- Order: Lepidoptera
- Family: Lycaenidae
- Genus: Anthene
- Species: A. melambrotus

Binomial name
- Anthene melambrotus (Holland, 1893)

Synonyms
- Lycaenesthes melambrotus Holland, 1893; Anthene (Anthene) melambrotus

= Anthene melambrotus =

Species of butterfly

Anthene melambrotus is a butterfly in the family Lycaenidae. It is found in Gabon.
