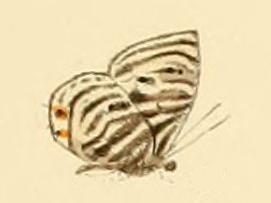

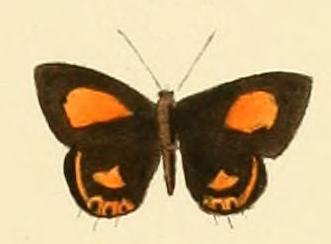

Scientific classification
- Domain: Eukaryota
- Kingdom: Animalia
- Phylum: Arthropoda
- Class: Insecta
- Order: Lepidoptera
- Family: Lycaenidae
- Genus: Anthene
- Species: A. leptines

Binomial name
- Anthene leptines (Hewitson, 1874)

Synonyms
- Lycaenesthes leptines Hewitson, 1874; Anthene (Anthene) leptines; Lycaenesthes leptines var. arnoldi Aurivillius, 1923

= Anthene leptines =

Leptines ciliate blue

Species of butterfly

Anthene leptines, or Leptines ciliate blue, is a butterfly in the family Lycaenidae. It is found in Cross River loop in Nigeria, Cameroon, Gabon, the Republic of the Congo, the Central African Republic and the Democratic Republic of the Congo (Equateur, Uele and Sankuru). Their natural habitat primarily consists of forests.
