= Anthene abruptus =

Scientific classification
- Kingdom: Animalia
- Phylum: Arthropoda
- Class: Insecta
- Order: Lepidoptera
- Family: Lycaenidae
- Genus: Anthene
- Species: A. abruptus

Binomial name
- Anthene abruptus (Gaede, 1915)

Synonyms
- Lycaenesthes abruptus Gaede, 1915; Anthene (Anthene) abruptus

Species of butterfly

Anthene abruptus is a butterfly in the family Lycaenidae. It is found in Cameroon.

In Seitz it is described- Upper surface agreeing with that of larydas Cr. (71 h); on the forewing beneath in larydas the white marginal line of the first basal double spot is distally almost rectilinear, proximally beginning from the middle bent inwards; in abrupta the proximal line terminates on the median vein, the distal line forming a small bow distally somewhat above the median vein and ending on this vein; the whole lower part of the basal spot is thus absent; the central spot between vein 1 and vein 2 is in bordered with white like the others, in abrupta there is only a brown, pointed spot without a light marginal line; the marginal spot following then between vein 1 and vein 2 is in abrupta not bordered proximally, but only separated from the central spot by the light ground-colour; hindwing like in larydas. Expanse of wings: 25 mm.Described according to a single specimen. As the only difference between this form and larydas is the formation of the spots in area 1 b on the forewing beneath, we may suspect it to have been founded upon an abnormal specimen in which the development of the marking of this area has been impeded. Cameroon, in the Yaunde District.
