= Anthene sheppardi =

Golden ciliate blue

Scientific classification
- Domain: Eukaryota
- Kingdom: Animalia
- Phylum: Arthropoda
- Class: Insecta
- Order: Lepidoptera
- Family: Lycaenidae
- Genus: Anthene
- Species: A. sheppardi

Binomial name
- Anthene sheppardi Stevenson, 1940

Synonyms
- Anthene (Anthene) sheppardi

Species of butterfly

Anthene sheppardi, the golden ciliate blue, is a butterfly in the family Lycaenidae. It is found in Mozambique and Zimbabwe. The habitat consists of forests.
