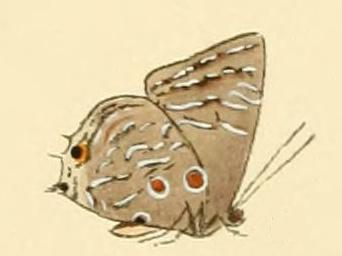

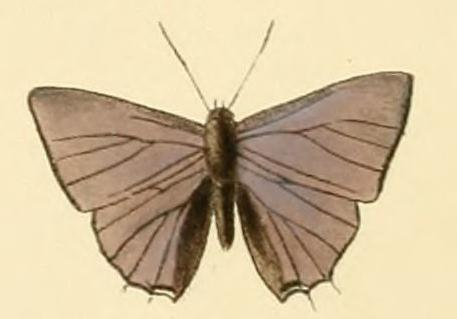

Scientific classification
- Domain: Eukaryota
- Kingdom: Animalia
- Phylum: Arthropoda
- Class: Insecta
- Order: Lepidoptera
- Family: Lycaenidae
- Genus: Anthene
- Species: A. lemnos

Binomial name
- Anthene lemnos (Hewitson, 1878)

Synonyms
- Lycaenesthes lemnos Hewitson, 1878; Lycaenesthes loa Strand, 1911

= Anthene lemnos =

Species of butterfly

Anthene lemnos, the large ciliate blue or large hairtail, is a butterfly of the family Lycaenidae. It is found in southern Africa.

The wingspan is 27–30 mm for males and 27–31 mm for females. Adults are on wing year-round, with peaks in summer and autumn.

The larvae feed on Erythrococco berberidea and Erythrococco polyandra.

== Subspecies ==
- Anthene lemnos lemnos (KwaZulu-Natal to Mozambique and Zimbabwe, Malawi)
- Anthene lemnos loa (Strand, 1911) (north-eastern Tanzania and the coast of eastern Kenya)
