= Anthene kikuyu =

Kikuyu ciliate blue

Scientific classification
- Domain: Eukaryota
- Kingdom: Animalia
- Phylum: Arthropoda
- Class: Insecta
- Order: Lepidoptera
- Family: Lycaenidae
- Genus: Anthene
- Species: A. kikuyu

Binomial name
- Anthene kikuyu (Bethune-Baker, 1910)

Synonyms
- Lycaenesthes otacilia var. kikuyu Bethune-Baker, 1910; Anthene (Anthene) kikuyu

Species of butterfly

Anthene kikuyu, the Kikuyu ciliate blue, is a butterfly in the family Lycaenidae. It is found in Mauritania, Ghana, Nigeria, Uganda, central and western Kenya and north-western Tanzania. The habitat consists of dry savanna.

Adults of both sexes are often attracted to the flowers of Acacia species.

The larvae feed on the young terminal shoots of Acacia lahai, Acacia stenocarpa and Dichrostachys species. They are associated with ants of the genus Crematogaster.
