= Anthene kalinzu =

Scientific classification
- Domain: Eukaryota
- Kingdom: Animalia
- Phylum: Arthropoda
- Class: Insecta
- Order: Lepidoptera
- Family: Lycaenidae
- Genus: Anthene
- Species: A. kalinzu

Binomial name
- Anthene kalinzu (Stempffer, 1950)

Synonyms
- Neurypexima kalinzu Stempffer, 1950; Anthene (Neurypexina) kalinzu

Species of butterfly

Anthene kalinzu is a butterfly in the family Lycaenidae. It is found in western Uganda and north-western Tanzania. The habitat consists of forests.
