= Anthene bjoernstadi =

Bjørnstad's hairtail

Scientific classification
- Kingdom: Animalia
- Phylum: Arthropoda
- Clade: Pancrustacea
- Class: Insecta
- Order: Lepidoptera
- Family: Lycaenidae
- Genus: Anthene
- Species: A. bjoernstadi

Binomial name
- Anthene bjoernstadi Collins & Larsen, 1991

Synonyms
- Anthene (Anthene) bjoernstadi

Species of butterfly

Anthene bjoernstadi, the Bjørnstad's hairtail, is a butterfly in the family Lycaenidae. It is found in western Kenya. Its habitat consists of forests.
