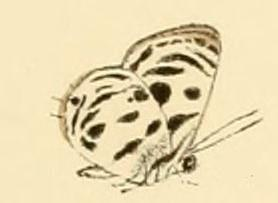

Scientific classification
- Domain: Eukaryota
- Kingdom: Animalia
- Phylum: Arthropoda
- Class: Insecta
- Order: Lepidoptera
- Family: Lycaenidae
- Genus: Anthene
- Species: A. lamprocles

Binomial name
- Anthene lamprocles (Hewitson, 1878)

Synonyms
- Lycaenesthes lamprocles Hewitson, 1878; Anthene (Neurypexina) lamprocles

= Anthene lamprocles =

Lesser black-patches

Species of butterfly

Anthene lamprocles, the lesser black-patches, is a butterfly in the family Lycaenidae. It is found in Nigeria (the Cross River loop), Cameroon, the Republic of the Congo, the Central African Republic and the Democratic Republic of the Congo (Uele and Ituri). The habitat consists of forests.
