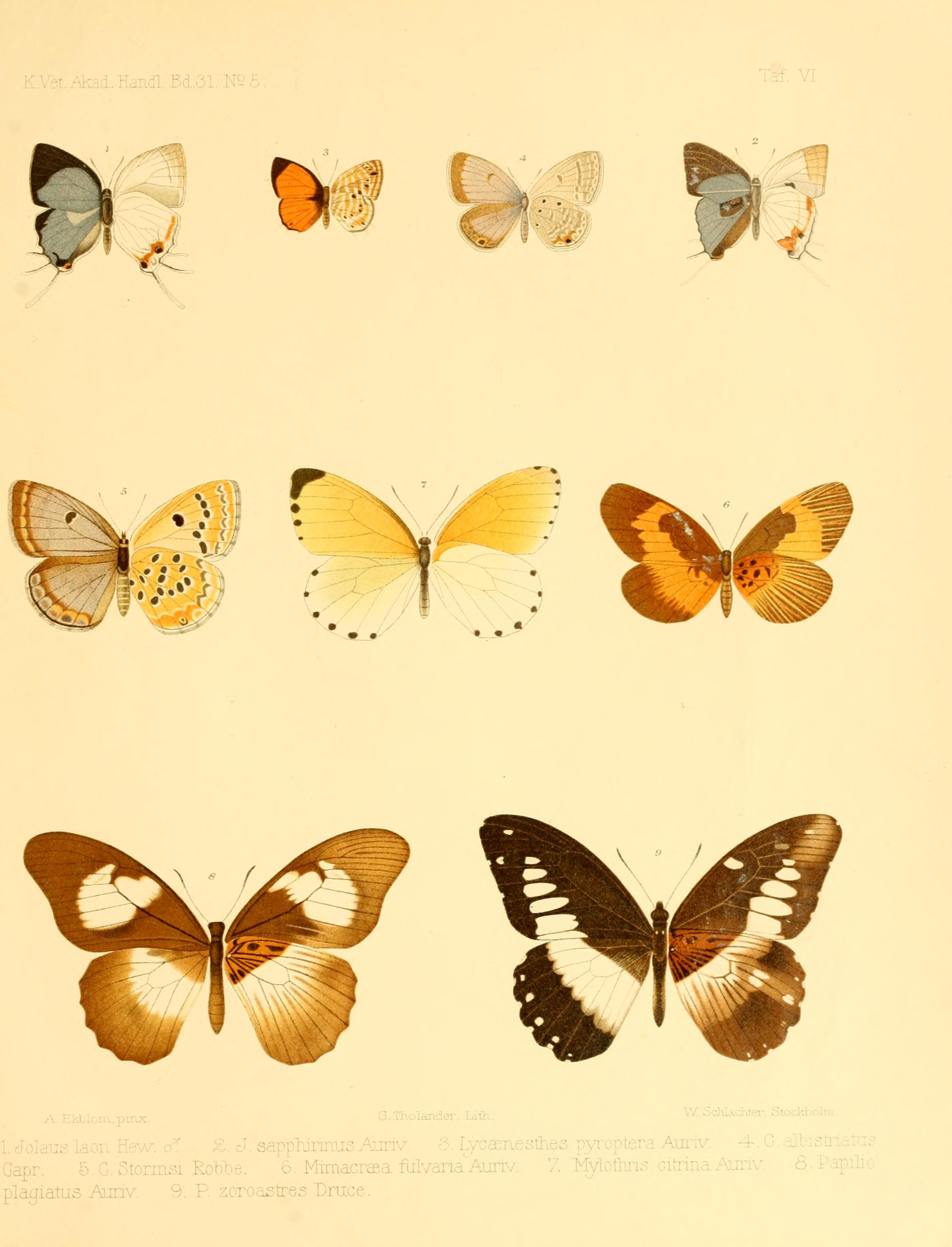
- in Rhopalocera Aethiopica Aurivillius, 1899 (figure 3)

Scientific classification
- Domain: Eukaryota
- Kingdom: Animalia
- Phylum: Arthropoda
- Class: Insecta
- Order: Lepidoptera
- Family: Lycaenidae
- Genus: Anthene
- Species: A. pyroptera

Binomial name
- Anthene pyroptera (Aurivillius, 1895)

Synonyms
- Lycaenesthes pyroptera Aurivillius, 1895; Anthene (Anthene) pyroptera

= Anthene pyroptera =

Species of insect

Anthene pyroptera is a butterfly in the family Lycaenidae. It is found in Cameroon, Gabon, the Republic of the Congo and the Democratic Republic of the Congo (Lulua).
