= Anthene africana =

Scientific classification
- Domain: Eukaryota
- Kingdom: Animalia
- Phylum: Arthropoda
- Class: Insecta
- Order: Lepidoptera
- Family: Lycaenidae
- Genus: Anthene
- Species: A. africana

Binomial name
- Anthene africana (Bethune-Baker, 1926)

Synonyms
- Triclema africana Bethune-Baker, 1926; Anthene (Triclema) africana

Species of butterfly

Anthene africana is a butterfly in the family Lycaenidae. It is found in Nigeria and Cameroon.
