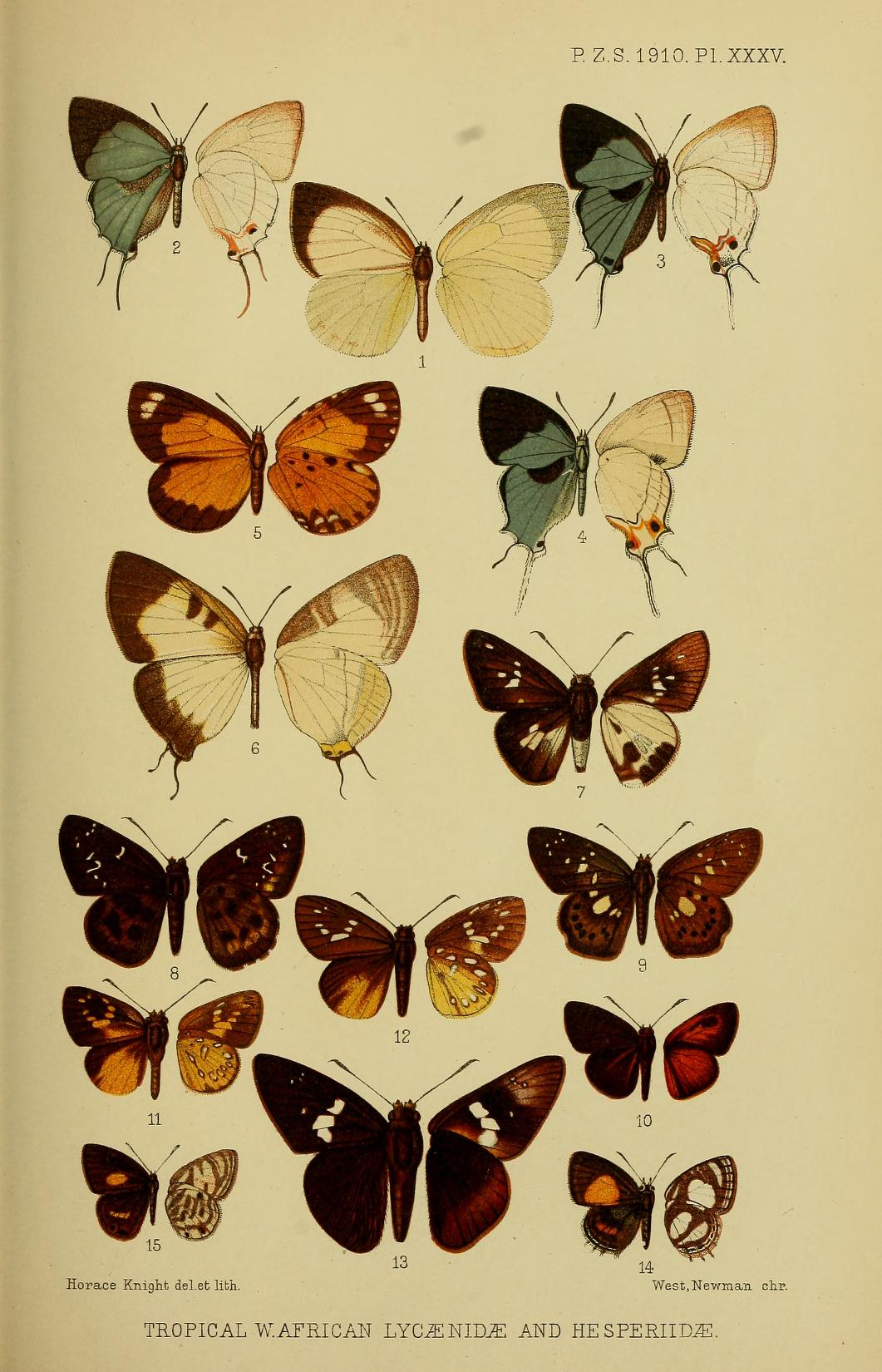
- Anthene zenkeri figure 14

Scientific classification
- Domain: Eukaryota
- Kingdom: Animalia
- Phylum: Arthropoda
- Class: Insecta
- Order: Lepidoptera
- Family: Lycaenidae
- Genus: Anthene
- Species: A. zenkeri

Binomial name
- Anthene zenkeri (Karsch, 1895)

Synonyms
- Lycaenesthes zenkeri Karsch, 1895; Anthene (Anthene) zenkeri; Lycaenesthes zenkeri ab. connexa Aurivillius, 1923

= Anthene zenkeri =

Species of butterfly

Anthene zenkeri is a butterfly in the family Lycaenidae. It is found in Cameroon, the Republic of Congo, the Democratic Republic of Congo (Uele and Tshopo) and western Uganda.
