= Anthene ramnika =

Scientific classification
- Domain: Eukaryota
- Kingdom: Animalia
- Phylum: Arthropoda
- Class: Insecta
- Order: Lepidoptera
- Family: Lycaenidae
- Genus: Anthene
- Species: A. ramnika

Binomial name
- Anthene ramnika d'Abrera, 1980

Synonyms
- Anthene (Anthene) ramnika

Species of butterfly

Anthene ramnika is a butterfly in the family Lycaenidae. It is found in Cameroon and the Democratic Republic of the Congo (Uele).
