= Anthene emkopoti =

Mkpot ciliate blue

Scientific classification
- Domain: Eukaryota
- Kingdom: Animalia
- Phylum: Arthropoda
- Class: Insecta
- Order: Lepidoptera
- Family: Lycaenidae
- Genus: Anthene
- Species: A. emkopoti

Binomial name
- Anthene emkopoti Larsen & Collins, 1998

Synonyms
- Anthene (Anthene) emkopoti

Species of butterfly

Anthene emkopoti, the Mkpot ciliate blue, is a butterfly in the family Lycaenidae. It is found in Nigeria (south and the Cross River loop) and western Cameroon. The habitat consists of forests.
