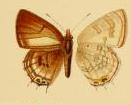
- Female
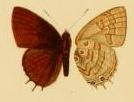
- Male

Scientific classification
- Domain: Eukaryota
- Kingdom: Animalia
- Phylum: Arthropoda
- Class: Insecta
- Order: Lepidoptera
- Family: Lycaenidae
- Genus: Anthene
- Species: A. indefinita

Binomial name
- Anthene indefinita (Bethune-Baker, 1910)

Synonyms
- Lycaenesthes indefinita Bethune-Baker, 1910; Anthene (Anthene) indefinita; Lycaenesthes bigamica Strand, 1911; Anthene indefinita f. oculata Stempffer, 1946

= Anthene indefinita =

Species of butterfly

Anthene indefinita is a butterfly in the family Lycaenidae. It is found in the Democratic Republic of the Congo (Uele and Shaba), Uganda, Ethiopia, central and western Kenya, Tanzania and Burundi. The habitat consists of moist savanna and forests.

The larvae feed on Erythrococca rigidifolia.
