= Neurellipes juba =

Anomalous ciliate blue

Conservation status
- Least Concern (IUCN 3.1)

Scientific classification
- Kingdom: Animalia
- Phylum: Arthropoda
- Clade: Pancrustacea
- Class: Insecta
- Order: Lepidoptera
- Family: Lycaenidae
- Genus: Neurellipes
- Species: N. juba

Binomial name
- Neurellipes juba (Fabricius, 1787)

Synonyms
- Papilio juba Fabricius, 1787; Anthene (Anthene) juba; Lycaenesthes dewitzi Staudinger, 1891

Species of butterfly

Neurellipes juba, formerly Anthene juba, the anomalous ciliate blue, is a butterfly in the family Lycaenidae. It is found in Guinea, Sierra Leone, Liberia, Ivory Coast, Ghana, eastern Nigeria and western Cameroon. The habitat consists of forests.

Torben Larsen developed a species numbering system for his 2005 publication Butterflies of West Africa. The nominate subspecies, described as Anthene juba is #539. The 'Larsen' numbers have since been used with permission in A Sharp Eye on Butterflies of Ghana.
