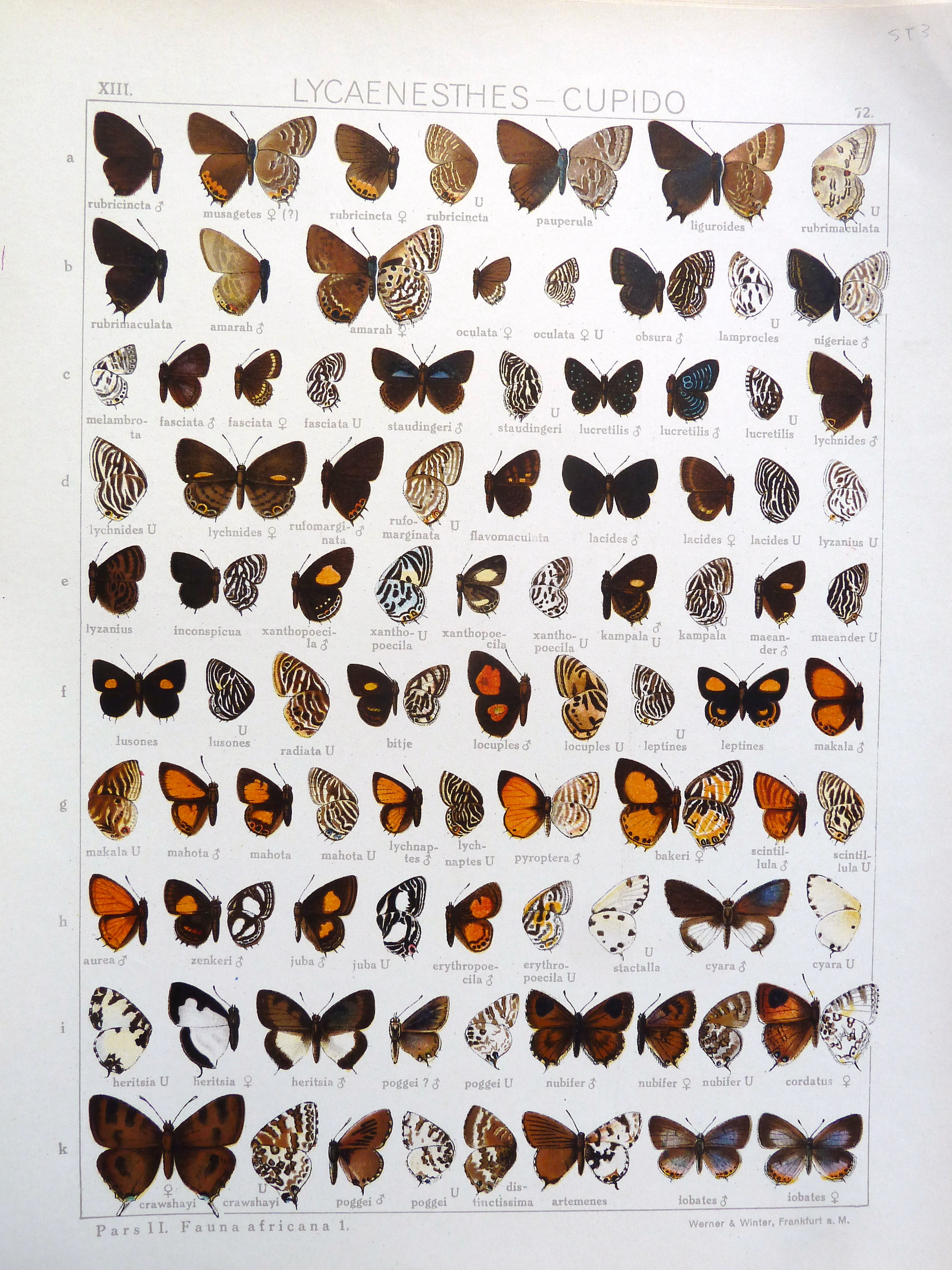
- d

Scientific classification
- Domain: Eukaryota
- Kingdom: Animalia
- Phylum: Arthropoda
- Class: Insecta
- Order: Lepidoptera
- Family: Lycaenidae
- Genus: Anthene
- Species: A. flavomaculatus

Binomial name
- Anthene flavomaculatus (Grose-Smith & Kirby, 1893)

Synonyms
- Lycaenesthes flavomaculatus Grose-Smith & Kirby, 1893; Anthene (Anthene) flavomaculatus

= Anthene flavomaculatus =

Yellow-spot ciliate blue

Species of butterfly

Anthene flavomaculatus, the yellow-spot ciliate blue, is a butterfly in the family Lycaenidae. It is found in Nigeria (south and the Cross River loop), Cameroon and northern Angola. The habitat consist of forests.

The larvae are associated with the following ant species: Crematogaster buchneri race winkleri, Crematogaster buchneri race alligatrix, Pheidole rotundata and Odontomachus haematodes.
