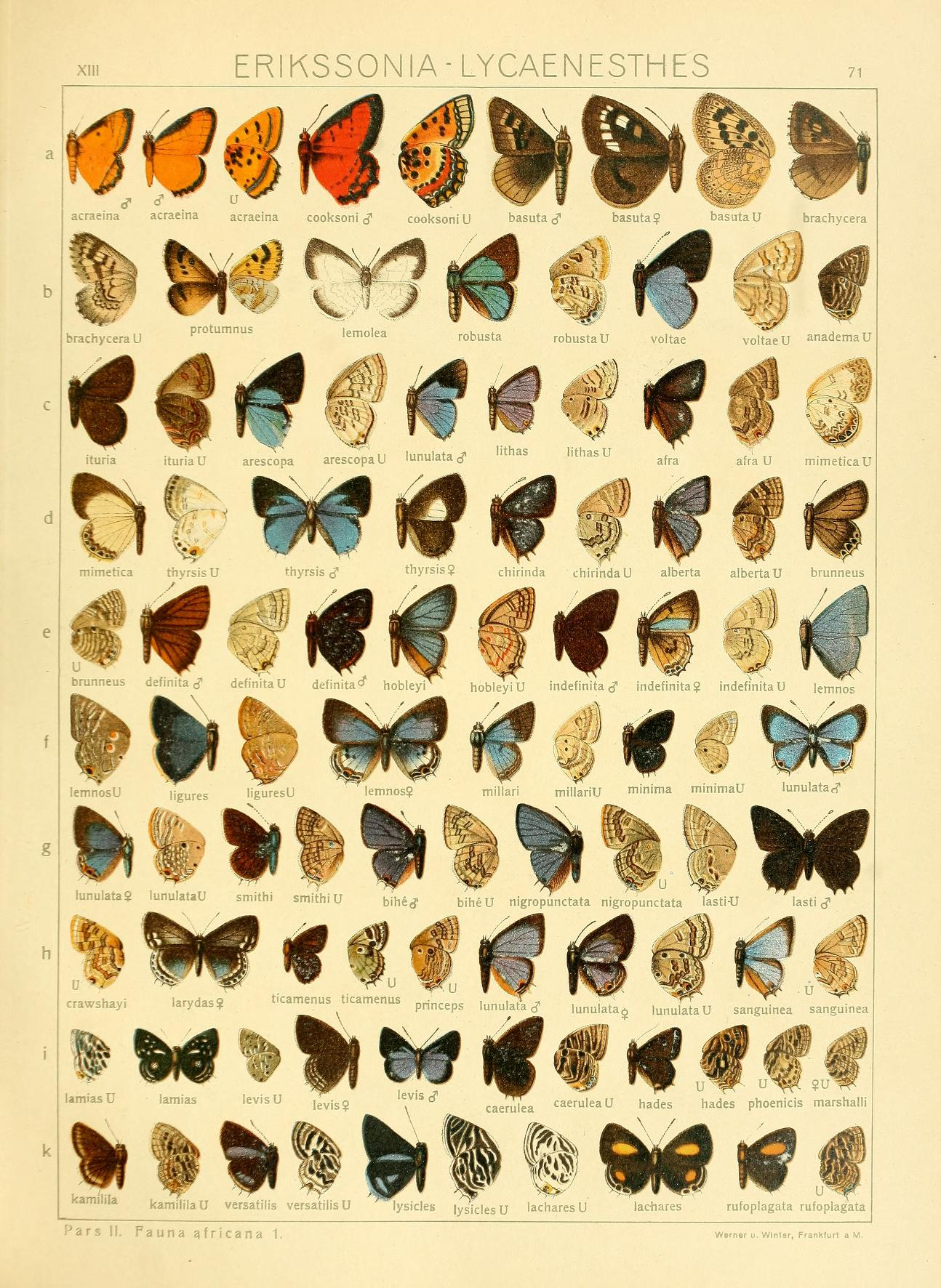

Conservation status
- Least Concern (IUCN 3.1)

Scientific classification
- Kingdom: Animalia
- Phylum: Arthropoda
- Class: Insecta
- Order: Lepidoptera
- Family: Lycaenidae
- Genus: Anthene
- Species: A. millari

Binomial name
- Anthene millari (Trimen, 1893)

Synonyms
- Lycaenesthes millari Trimen, 1893

= Anthene millari =

Millar's hairtail

Species of butterfly

Anthene millari, or Millar's hairtail, is a butterfly of the family Lycaenidae. It is found in South Africa and Malawi. In South Africa, it is found in the Eastern Cape, the KwaZulu-Natal midlands, Gauteng, Mpumalanga and Limpopo.

The wingspan is 21–24 mm for males and 22–28 mm for females. Adults are on wing from October to January, with a peak in November. There is a single extended generation per year.

The larvae probably feed on Kalanchoe and Cotyledon species.
