= Anthene phoenicis =

Karsch's ciliate blue

Scientific classification
- Kingdom: Animalia
- Phylum: Arthropoda
- Clade: Pancrustacea
- Class: Insecta
- Order: Lepidoptera
- Family: Lycaenidae
- Genus: Anthene
- Species: A. phoenicis

Binomial name
- Anthene phoenicis (Karsch, 1893)

Synonyms
- Triclema phoenicis Karsch, 1893; Anthene (Triclema) phoenicis

Species of butterfly

Triclema phoenicis, formerly Anthene phoenicis, Karsch's ciliate blue, is a butterfly in the family Lycaenidae. It is found in eastern Senegal, Sierra Leone, Burkina Faso, Ivory Coast, Ghana, Togo, southern Nigeria and Cameroon. The habitat consists of forests.

Adult males mud-puddle.

Torben Larsen developed a species numbering system for his 2005 publication Butterflies of West Africa. The nominate subspecies, then Anthene phoenicis is #555. The 'Larsen' numbers have since been used with permission in A Sharp Eye on Butterflies of Ghana.
