= Anthene krokosua =

Krokosua ciliate blue

Scientific classification
- Domain: Eukaryota
- Kingdom: Animalia
- Phylum: Arthropoda
- Class: Insecta
- Order: Lepidoptera
- Family: Lycaenidae
- Genus: Anthene
- Species: A. krokosua

Binomial name
- Anthene krokosua (Larsen, 2005)

Synonyms
- Triclema krokosua Larsen, 2005; Anthene (Triclema) krokosua

Species of butterfly

Anthene krokosua, the Krokosua ciliate blue, is a butterfly in the family Lycaenidae. It is found in Ghana.
