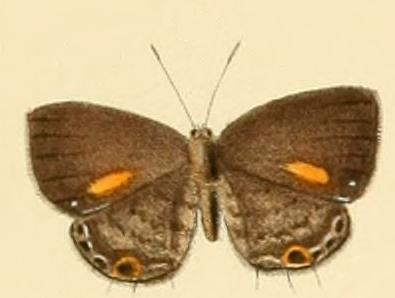

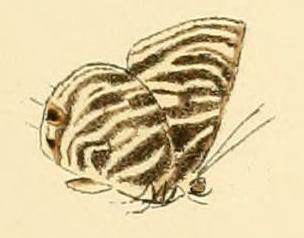

Scientific classification
- Domain: Eukaryota
- Kingdom: Animalia
- Phylum: Arthropoda
- Class: Insecta
- Order: Lepidoptera
- Family: Lycaenidae
- Genus: Anthene
- Species: A. lychnides

Binomial name
- Anthene lychnides (Hewitson, 1878)

Synonyms
- Lycaenesthes lychnides Hewitson, 1878; Anthene (Anthene) lychnides

= Anthene lychnides =

Brown ciliate blue

Species of butterfly

Anthene lychnides, the brown ciliate blue, is a butterfly in the family Lycaenidae. It is found in southern Nigeria and western Cameroon. The habitat probably consists of forests.
