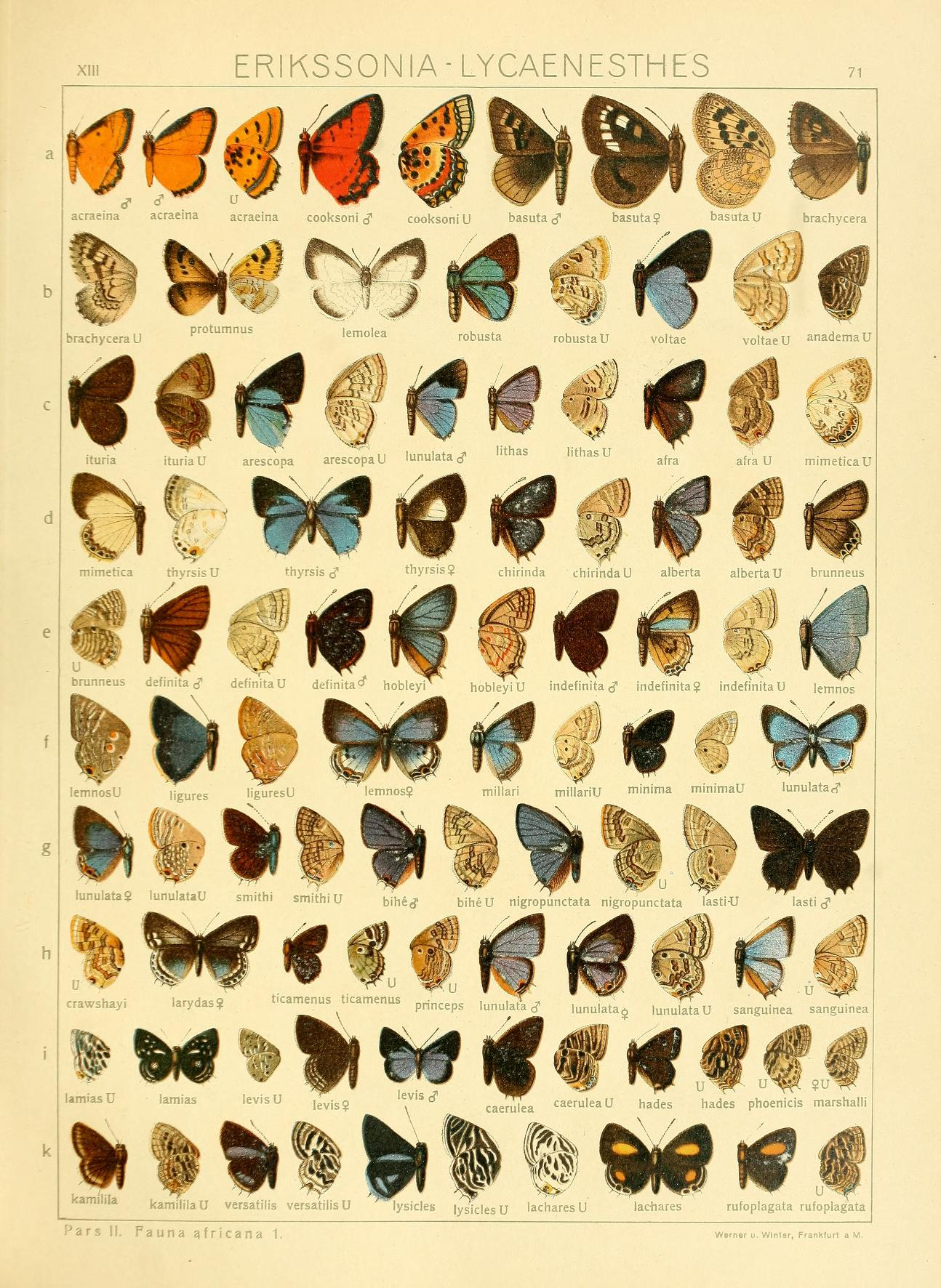

Scientific classification
- Domain: Eukaryota
- Kingdom: Animalia
- Phylum: Arthropoda
- Class: Insecta
- Order: Lepidoptera
- Family: Lycaenidae
- Genus: Anthene
- Species: A. marshalli

Binomial name
- Anthene marshalli (Bethune-Baker, 1903)

Synonyms
- Lycaenesthes marshalli Bethune-Baker, 1903; Anthene (Triclema) marshalli

= Anthene marshalli =

Species of butterfly

Anthene marshalli is a butterfly in the family Lycaenidae. It is found in Sierra Leone, Burkina Faso and Nigeria.
