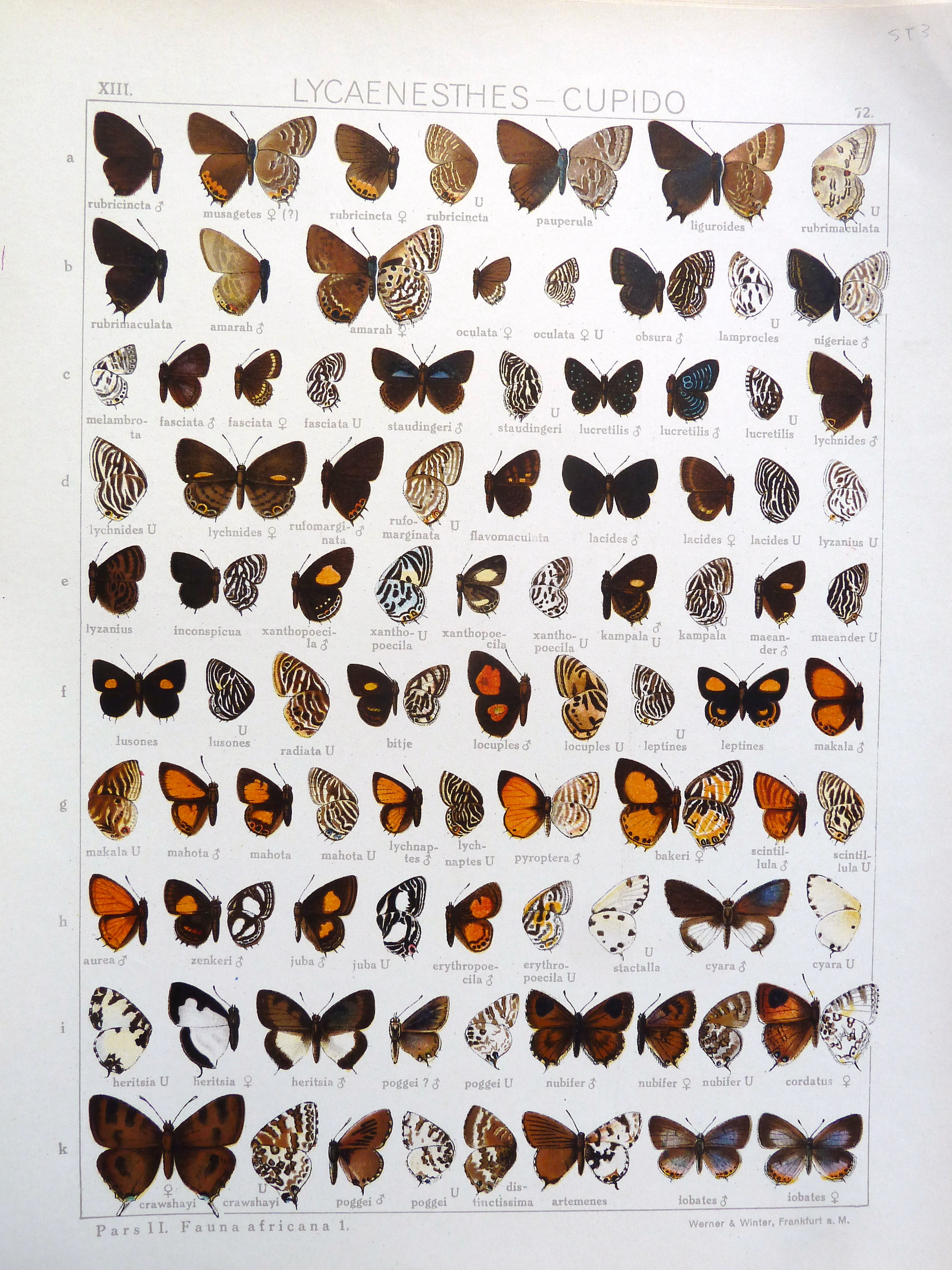
- h

Scientific classification
- Domain: Eukaryota
- Kingdom: Animalia
- Phylum: Arthropoda
- Class: Insecta
- Order: Lepidoptera
- Family: Lycaenidae
- Genus: Anthene
- Species: A. makala

Binomial name
- Anthene makala (Bethune-Baker, 1910)

Synonyms
- Lycaenesthes makala Bethune-Baker, 1910; Anthene (Anthene) makala

= Anthene makala =

Species of butterfly

Anthene makala is a butterfly in the family Lycaenidae. It is found in Cameroon, the Republic of the Congo and the Democratic Republic of the Congo (Uele).
