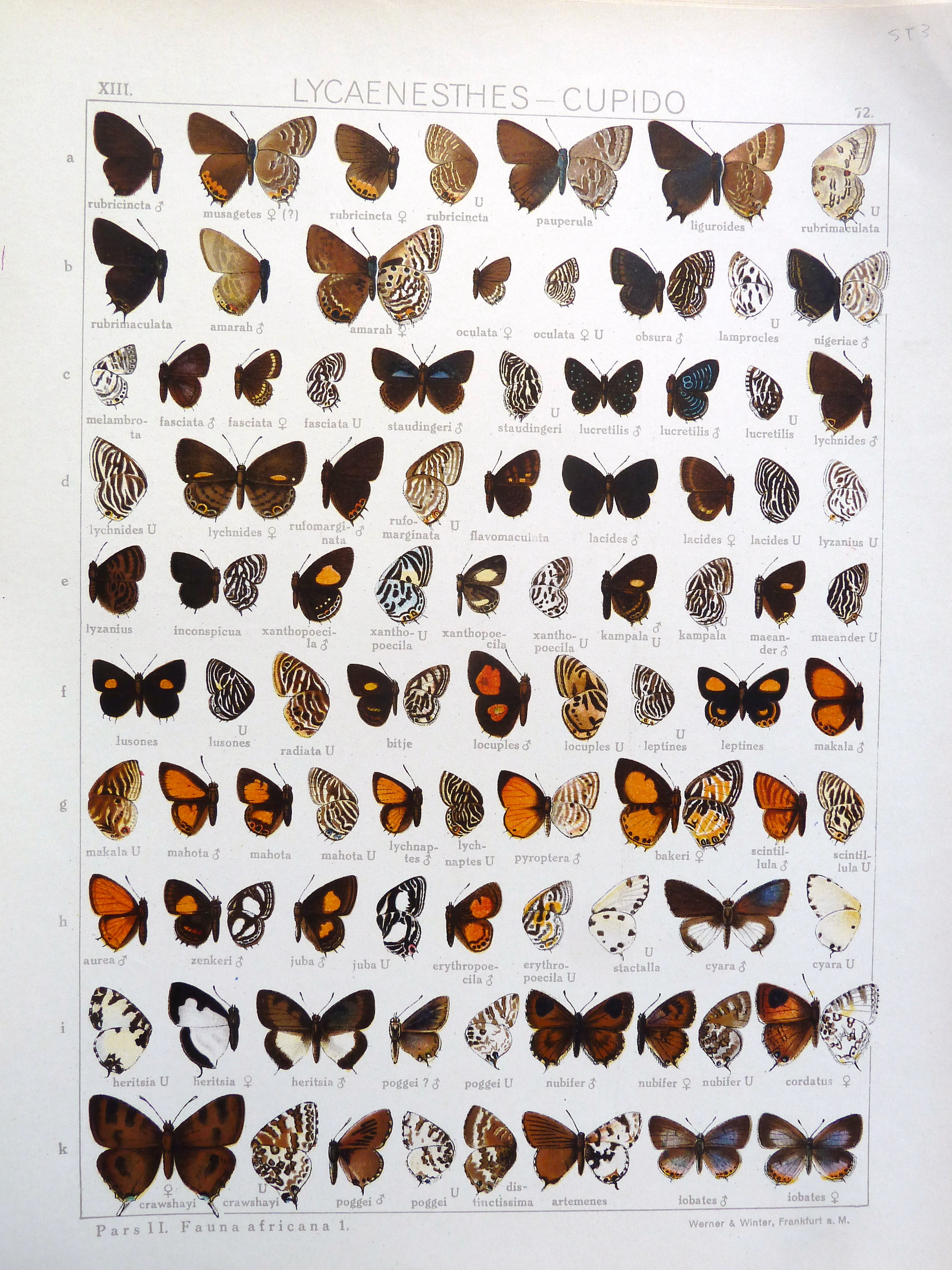
- b

Scientific classification
- Domain: Eukaryota
- Kingdom: Animalia
- Phylum: Arthropoda
- Class: Insecta
- Order: Lepidoptera
- Family: Lycaenidae
- Genus: Anthene
- Species: A. oculatus

Binomial name
- Anthene oculatus (Grose-Smith & Kirby, 1893)

Synonyms
- Lycaenesthes oculatus Grose-Smith & Kirby, 1893; Anthene (Triclema) oculatus

= Anthene oculatus =

Species of butterfly

Anthene oculatus is a butterfly in the family Lycaenidae. It is found in Gabon and north-western Tanzania. The habitat consists of forests.
