= Anthene ngoko =

Scientific classification
- Domain: Eukaryota
- Kingdom: Animalia
- Phylum: Arthropoda
- Class: Insecta
- Order: Lepidoptera
- Family: Lycaenidae
- Genus: Anthene
- Species: A. ngoko

Binomial name
- Anthene ngoko Stempffer, 1962

Synonyms
- Anthene (Anthene) ngoko

Species of butterfly

Anthene ngoko is a butterfly in the family Lycaenidae. It is found in Cameroon and the Republic of the Congo.
