= Anthene likouala =

Scientific classification
- Domain: Eukaryota
- Kingdom: Animalia
- Phylum: Arthropoda
- Class: Insecta
- Order: Lepidoptera
- Family: Lycaenidae
- Genus: Anthene
- Species: A. likouala

Binomial name
- Anthene likouala Stempffer, 1962

Synonyms
- Anthene (Neurellipes) likouala

Species of butterfly

Anthene likouala is a butterfly in the family Lycaenidae. It is found in the Republic of the Congo and the central part of the Democratic Republic of the Congo.
