= Anthene chirinda =

Chirinda hairtail

Scientific classification
- Domain: Eukaryota
- Kingdom: Animalia
- Phylum: Arthropoda
- Class: Insecta
- Order: Lepidoptera
- Family: Lycaenidae
- Genus: Anthene
- Species: A. chirinda

Binomial name
- Anthene chirinda (Bethune-Baker, 1910)

Synonyms
- Lycaenesthes chirinda Bethune-Baker, 1910; Anthene (Anthene) chirinda

Species of butterfly

Anthene chirinda, the Chirinda hairtail, is a butterfly in the family Lycaenidae. It is found in Tanzania, Malawi and Zimbabwe.
