= Anthene atewa =

Atewa ciliate blue

Scientific classification
- Domain: Eukaryota
- Kingdom: Animalia
- Phylum: Arthropoda
- Class: Insecta
- Order: Lepidoptera
- Family: Lycaenidae
- Genus: Anthene
- Species: A. atewa

Binomial name
- Anthene atewa Larsen & Collins, 1998

Synonyms
- Anthene (Anthene) atewa

Species of butterfly

Anthene atewa, the Atewa ciliate blue, is a butterfly in the family Lycaenidae. It is found in eastern Ivory Coast and Ghana. The habitat consists of primary forests.
