= Anthene quadricaudata =

Scientific classification
- Domain: Eukaryota
- Kingdom: Animalia
- Phylum: Arthropoda
- Class: Insecta
- Order: Lepidoptera
- Family: Lycaenidae
- Genus: Anthene
- Species: A. quadricaudata

Binomial name
- Anthene quadricaudata (Bethune-Baker, 1926)

Synonyms
- Triclema quadricaudata Bethune-Baker, 1926; Anthene (Neurypexina) quadricaudata

Species of butterfly

Anthene quadricaudata is a butterfly in the family Lycaenidae. It is found in Cameroon, the Republic of the Congo and Uganda.
