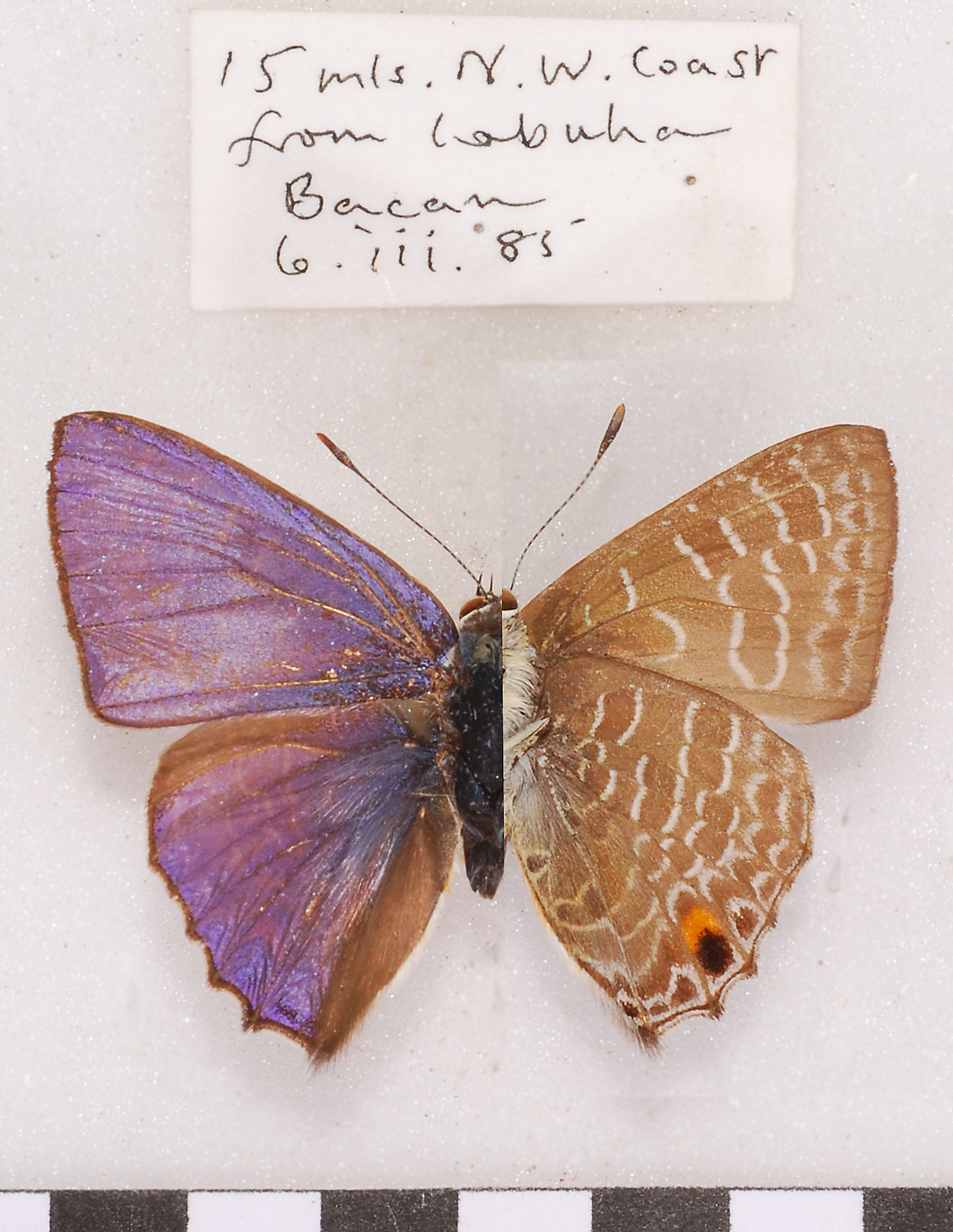

Scientific classification
- Kingdom: Animalia
- Phylum: Arthropoda
- Class: Insecta
- Order: Lepidoptera
- Family: Lycaenidae
- Genus: Anthene
- Species: A. licates

Binomial name
- Anthene licates (Hewitson, 1874)

Synonyms
- Lycaenesthes licates Hewitson, 1874; Lycaenesthes lycaenina addenda Fruhstorfer, 1916; Lycaenesthes lycaenina philetas Fruhstorfer, 1916

= Anthene licates =

Species of butterfly

Anthene licates or White Ciliate Blue is a butterfly in the family Lycaenidae. It is found in South-east Asia.

== Subspecies ==
- A. l. licates (Sulawesi, Banggai)
- A. l. addenda (Fruhstorfer, 1916) (Palawan)
- A. l. dusuntua Corbet, 1940 (Peninsular Malaya, Langkawi, possibly Borneo, Sumatra)
- A. l. philetas (Fruhstorfer, 1916) (possibly Bachan, Obi, Arfak Peninsula, West Irian: Kapaur)
