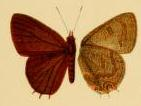

Scientific classification
- Domain: Eukaryota
- Kingdom: Animalia
- Phylum: Arthropoda
- Class: Insecta
- Order: Lepidoptera
- Family: Lycaenidae
- Genus: Anthene
- Species: A. ituria

Binomial name
- Anthene ituria (Bethune-Baker, 1910)

Synonyms
- Lycaenesthes ituria Bethune-Baker, 1910; Anthene (Anthene) ituria

= Anthene ituria =

Species of butterfly

Anthene ituria is a butterfly in the family Lycaenidae. It is found in the Democratic Republic of the Congo (Mongala, Uele, Ituri, North Kivu, Tshopo, Equateur, Sankuru and Maniema) and Uganda.
