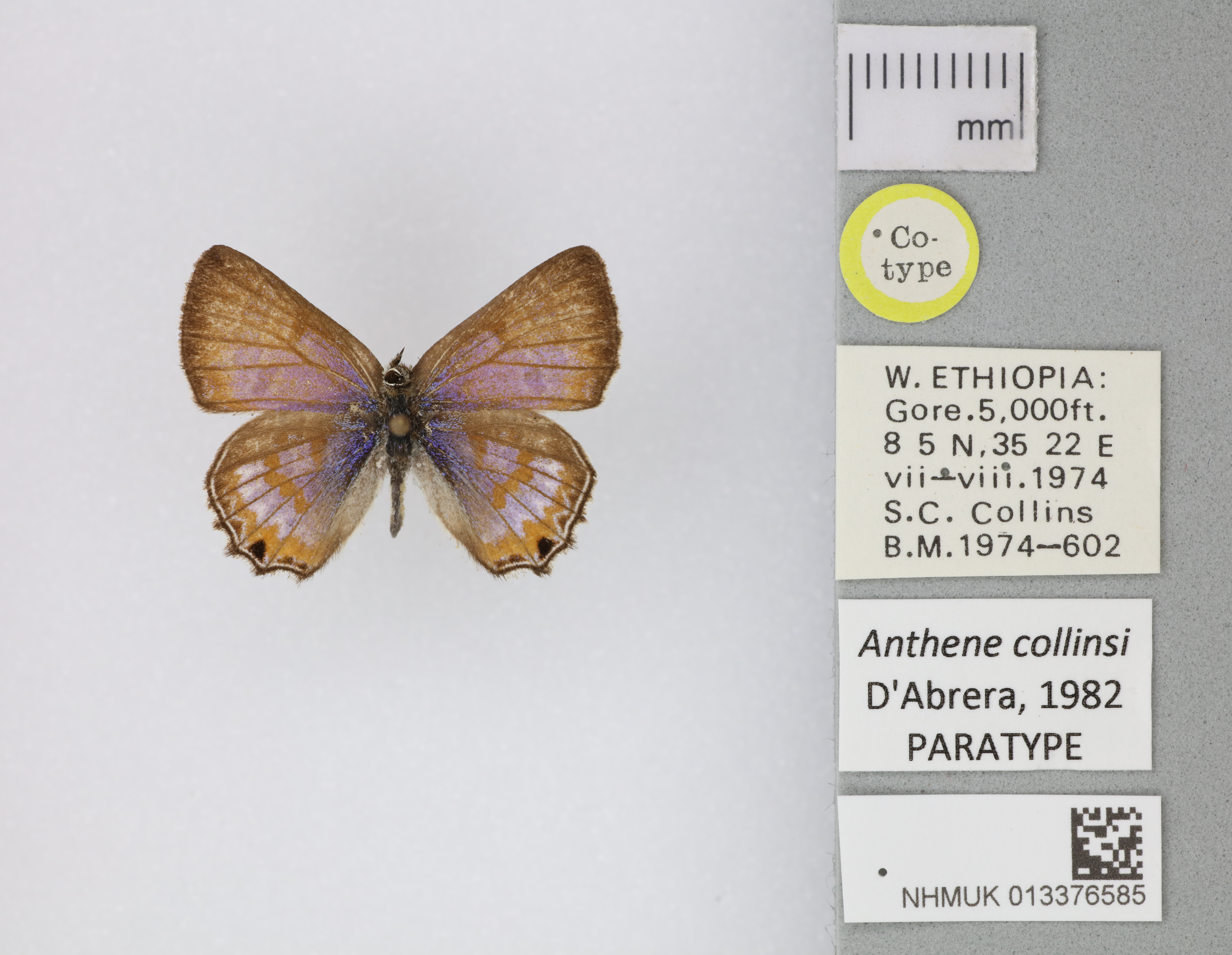

Scientific classification
- Kingdom: Animalia
- Phylum: Arthropoda
- Class: Insecta
- Order: Lepidoptera
- Family: Lycaenidae
- Genus: Anthene
- Species: A. collinsi

Binomial name
- Anthene collinsi d'Abrera, 1980

Synonyms
- Anthene (Anthene) collinsi

= Anthene collinsi =

Species of butterfly

Anthene collinsi is a butterfly in the family Lycaenidae. It is found in western Ethiopia.
