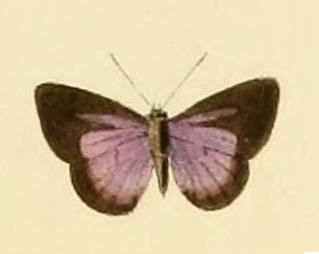

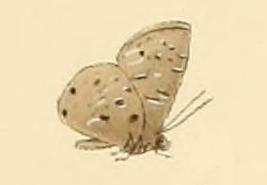

Scientific classification
- Domain: Eukaryota
- Kingdom: Animalia
- Phylum: Arthropoda
- Class: Insecta
- Order: Lepidoptera
- Family: Lycaenidae
- Genus: Anthene
- Species: A. levis

Binomial name
- Anthene levis (Hewitson, 1878)

Synonyms
- Lycaenesthes levis Hewitson, 1878; Anthene (Anthene) levis; Lycaenesthes levis grisea Talbot, 1935

= Anthene levis =

Levis ciliate blue

Species of butterfly

Anthene levis, the Levis ciliate blue, is a butterfly in the family Lycaenidae. It is found in Ivory Coast, Ghana, Togo, Nigeria (south and the Cross River loop), Cameroon, Gabon, the Republic of the Congo, the Democratic Republic of the Congo (Uele, Equateur and Lualaba), Uganda and Zambia. The habitat consists of dense woodland and forest fringes.

The larvae feed on Loranthus species. They are associated with ants of the genus Crematogaster, living in the inner runs and nests. The larvae are grub-like.
