= Anthene kimboza =

Scientific classification
- Domain: Eukaryota
- Kingdom: Animalia
- Phylum: Arthropoda
- Class: Insecta
- Order: Lepidoptera
- Family: Lycaenidae
- Genus: Anthene
- Species: A. kimboza

Binomial name
- Anthene kimboza (Kielland, 1990)

Synonyms
- Triclema kimboza Kielland, 1990; Anthene (Triclema) kimboza

Species of butterfly

Anthene kimboza is a butterfly in the family Lycaenidae. It is found in Kenya (the Arabuko-Sokoke Forest) and north-eastern Tanzania. The habitat consists of forests at altitudes of about 500 metres.

The length of the forewings is about 10.2 mm.
