= Anthene rhodesiana =

Zimbabwe hairtail

Scientific classification
- Domain: Eukaryota
- Kingdom: Animalia
- Phylum: Arthropoda
- Class: Insecta
- Order: Lepidoptera
- Family: Lycaenidae
- Genus: Anthene
- Species: A. rhodesiana

Binomial name
- Anthene rhodesiana Stempffer, 1962

Synonyms
- Anthene (Anthene) rhodesiana

Species of butterfly

Anthene rhodesiana, the Zimbabwe hairtail, is a butterfly in the family Lycaenidae. It is found in Zambia (the Copperbelt and the north-eastern part of the country) and north-eastern Zimbabwe. The habitat consists of deciduous woodland.

Adults have been recorded on wing in October, January and April.
