= Anthene georgiadisi =

Scientific classification
- Kingdom: Animalia
- Phylum: Arthropoda
- Class: Insecta
- Order: Lepidoptera
- Family: Lycaenidae
- Genus: Anthene
- Species: A. georgiadisi

Binomial name
- Anthene georgiadisi Larsen, 2009

Species of butterfly

Anthene georgiadisi is a butterfly in the family Lycaenidae. It is found in Liberia.
