= Anthene montana =

Scientific classification
- Kingdom: Animalia
- Phylum: Arthropoda
- Class: Insecta
- Order: Lepidoptera
- Family: Lycaenidae
- Genus: Anthene
- Species: A. montana

Binomial name
- Anthene montana Kielland, 1990

Synonyms
- Anthene (Anthene) montana

Species of butterfly

Anthene montana is a butterfly in the family Lycaenidae. It is found in Tanzania (from the eastern part of the country to the Uluguru Mountains).

The length of the forewings is approximately 15.8 millimetres (0.62 in).
