= Anthene aequatorialis =

Scientific classification
- Kingdom: Animalia
- Phylum: Arthropoda
- Class: Insecta
- Order: Lepidoptera
- Family: Lycaenidae
- Genus: Anthene
- Species: A. aequatorialis

Binomial name
- Anthene aequatorialis Stempffer, 1962

Synonyms
- Anthene (Neurellipes) aequatorialis

Species of butterfly

Anthene aequatorialis is a butterfly in the family Lycaenidae. It is found in Tshuapa in the Democratic Republic of the Congo.
