= Anthene rothschildi =

Scientific classification
- Domain: Eukaryota
- Kingdom: Animalia
- Phylum: Arthropoda
- Class: Insecta
- Order: Lepidoptera
- Family: Lycaenidae
- Genus: Anthene
- Species: A. rothschildi

Binomial name
- Anthene rothschildi (Aurivillius, 1922)

Synonyms
- Lycaenesthes rothschildi Aurivillius, 1922; Anthene (Anthene) rothschildi

Species of butterfly

Anthene rothschildi is a butterfly in the family Lycaenidae. It is found in Ethiopia and possibly Kenya.
