= Anthene starki =

Western black-spot ciliate blue

Scientific classification
- Kingdom: Animalia
- Phylum: Arthropoda
- Clade: Pancrustacea
- Class: Insecta
- Order: Lepidoptera
- Family: Lycaenidae
- Genus: Anthene
- Species: A. starki

Binomial name
- Anthene starki Larsen, 2005

Synonyms
- Anthene (Anthene) starki

Species of butterfly

Anthene starki, the western black-spot ciliate blue, is a butterfly in the family Lycaenidae. It is found in Guinea, Burkina Faso, Ivory Coast, Ghana, Togo, Benin, north-central Cameroon, the Central African Republic, and the northern part of the Democratic Republic of the Congo. The habitat consists of Guinea savanna and dry forest mosaic.

Adult males mud-puddle. Adults have been recorded on wing in January.

Torben Larsen developed a species numbering system for his 2005 publication Butterflies of West Africa. This species is #515. The 'Larsen' numbers have since been used with permission in A Sharp Eye on Butterflies of Ghana.

== Etymology ==
The species is named for Malcolm Stark.
