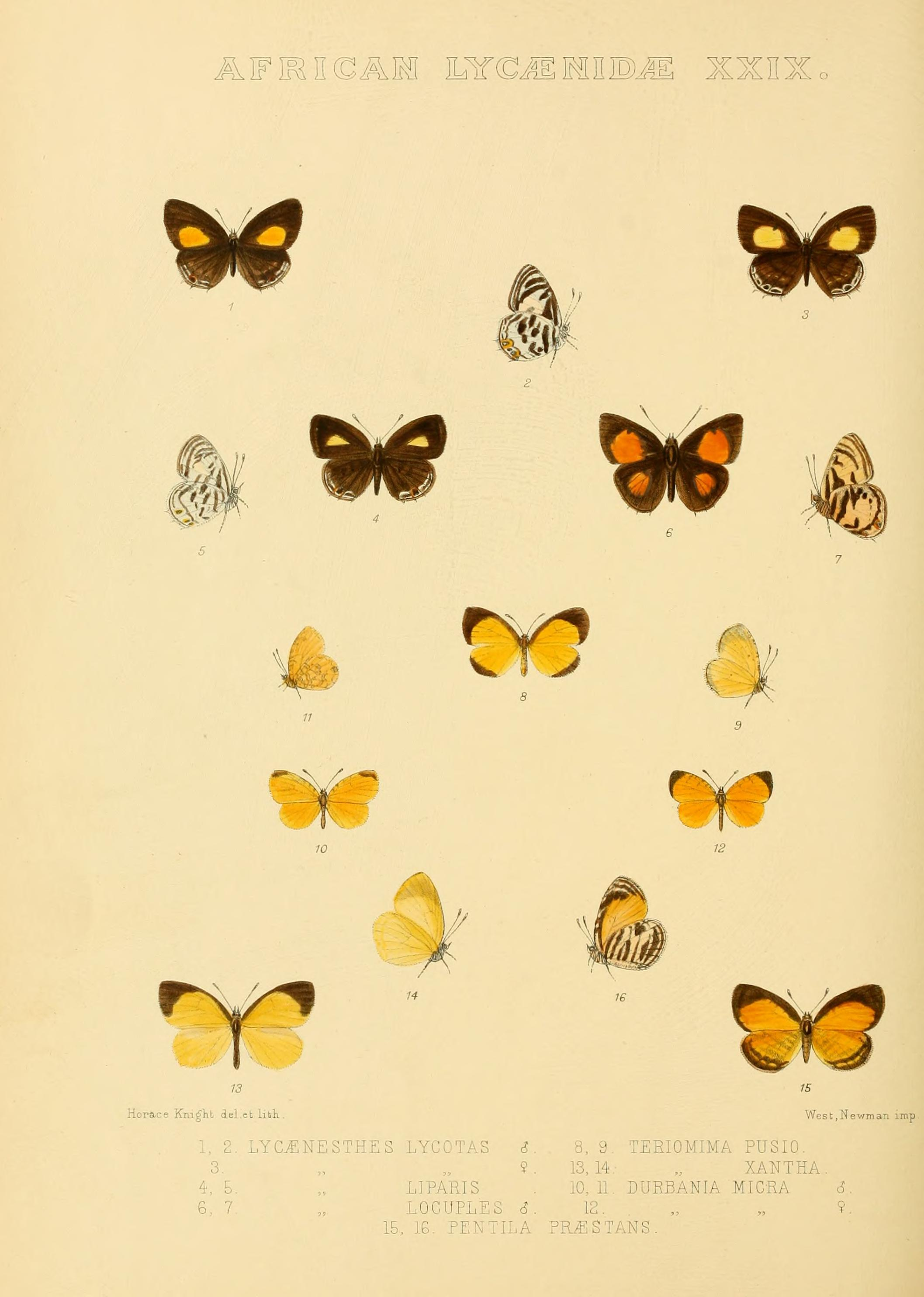
- Figures 1 & 2 (male) and 3 (female)

Scientific classification
- Domain: Eukaryota
- Kingdom: Animalia
- Phylum: Arthropoda
- Class: Insecta
- Order: Lepidoptera
- Family: Lycaenidae
- Genus: Anthene
- Species: A. xanthopoecilus

Binomial name
- Anthene xanthopoecilus (Holland, 1893)

Synonyms
- Lycaenesthes xanthopoecilus Holland, 1893; Anthene (Anthene) xanthopoecilus; Lycaenesthes lukokescha Karsch, 1895; Lycaenesthes lycotas Grose-Smith, 1898

= Anthene xanthopoecilus =

Species of butterfly

Anthene xanthopoecilus is a butterfly in the family Lycaenidae. It is found in Gabon, the Republic of the Congo, and the Democratic Republic of the Congo (Uele, Ituri, North Kivu, Sankuru and Lualaba).
