= Anthene barnesi =

Barnes's hairtail

Scientific classification
- Kingdom: Animalia
- Phylum: Arthropoda
- Class: Insecta
- Order: Lepidoptera
- Family: Lycaenidae
- Genus: Anthene
- Species: A. barnesi

Binomial name
- Anthene barnesi Stevenson, 1940

Synonyms
- Anthene (Anthene) barnesi

Species of butterfly

Anthene barnesi, the Barnes's hairtail, is a butterfly in the family Lycaenidae. It is found in the Vumba Mountains of Zimbabwe. Their habitat consists of forests.

Adults of both sexes mud-puddle. They are on wing from September to May.
