= Anthene tisamenus =

Scientific classification
- Domain: Eukaryota
- Kingdom: Animalia
- Phylum: Arthropoda
- Class: Insecta
- Order: Lepidoptera
- Family: Lycaenidae
- Genus: Anthene
- Species: A. tisamenus

Binomial name
- Anthene tisamenus (Holland, 1891)

Synonyms
- Lycaenesthes tisamenus Holland, 1891; Anthene (Triclema) tisamenus

Species of butterfly

Anthene tisamenus is a butterfly in the family Lycaenidae. It is found in Gabon.
