= Anthene onias =

Scientific classification
- Kingdom: Animalia
- Phylum: Arthropoda
- Class: Insecta
- Order: Lepidoptera
- Family: Lycaenidae
- Genus: Anthene
- Species: A. onias

Binomial name
- Anthene onias (Hulstaert, 1924)

Synonyms
- Lycaenesthes onias Hulstaert, 1924; Anthene (Anthene) onias

Species of butterfly

Anthene onias is a butterfly in the family Lycaenidae. It is found in the Democratic Republic of the Congo (Uele, Ituri, Tshopo, Sankuru and Lualaba).
