= Anthene kamilila =

Scientific classification
- Domain: Eukaryota
- Kingdom: Animalia
- Phylum: Arthropoda
- Class: Insecta
- Order: Lepidoptera
- Family: Lycaenidae
- Genus: Anthene
- Species: A. kamilila

Binomial name
- Anthene kamilila (Bethune-Baker, 1910)

Synonyms
- Triclema kamilila Bethune-Baker, 1910; Anthene (Triclema) kamilila

Species of butterfly

Anthene kamilila is a butterfly in the family Lycaenidae. It is found in the Democratic Republic of the Congo, Uganda, western Kenya and Tanzania (the Kigoma district and the north-western part of the country). The habitat consists of forests.

Adult males have been observed to mud-puddle, a behavior which seeks out nutrients in certain moist substances, that is common to insects such as butterflies.
