= Anthene aurobrunnea =

Scientific classification
- Kingdom: Animalia
- Phylum: Arthropoda
- Class: Insecta
- Order: Lepidoptera
- Family: Lycaenidae
- Genus: Anthene
- Species: A. aurobrunnea

Binomial name
- Anthene aurobrunnea (Ungemach, 1932)

Synonyms
- Lycaenesthes aurobrunnea Ungemach, 1932; Anthene (Anthene) aurobrunnea; Lycaenesthes aurobrunnea f. coelastina Ungemach, 1932

Species of butterfly

Anthene aurobrunnea is a butterfly in the family Lycaenidae. It is found on the highlands of Ethiopia.
