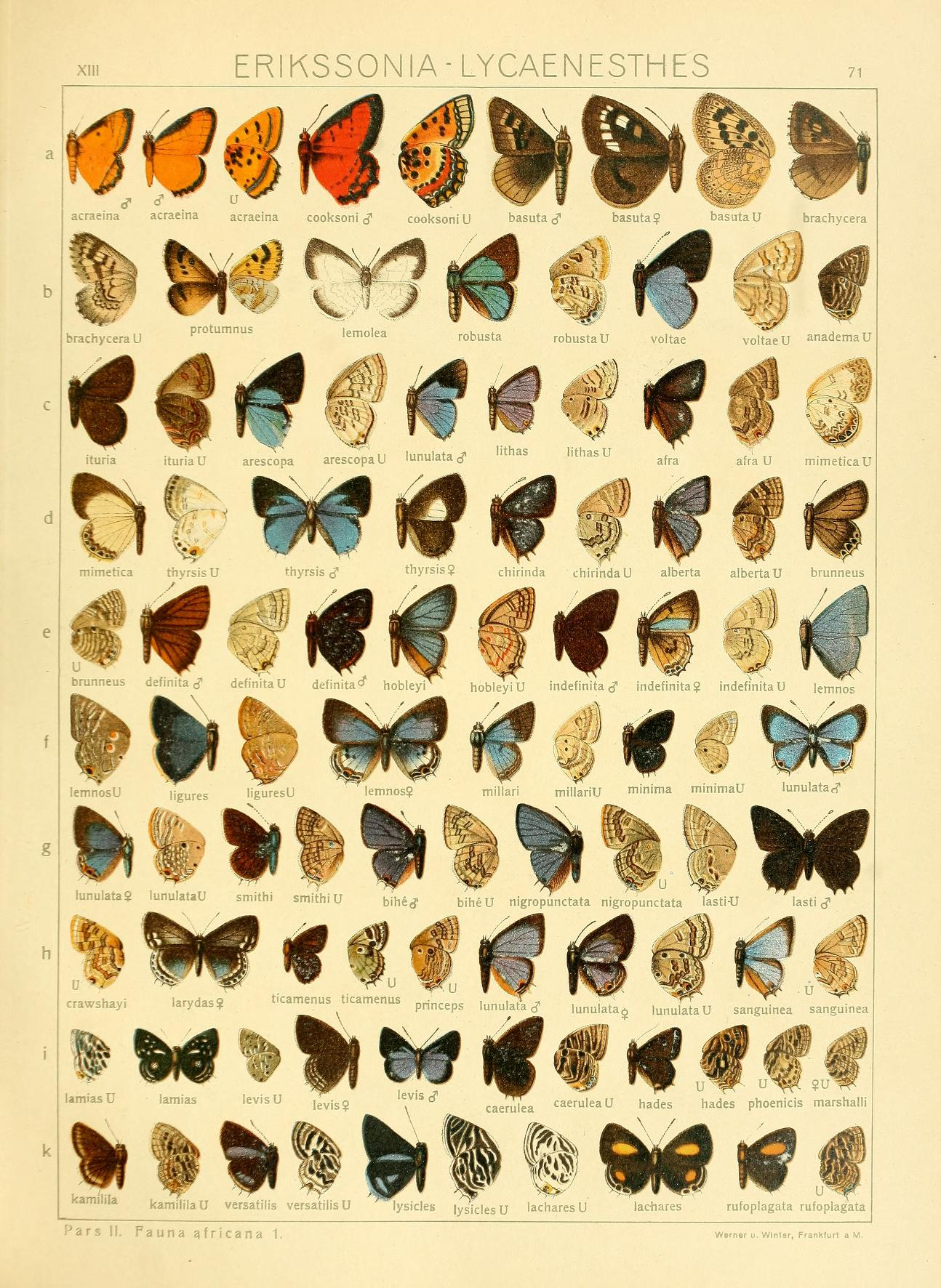

Scientific classification
- Kingdom: Animalia
- Phylum: Arthropoda
- Class: Insecta
- Order: Lepidoptera
- Family: Lycaenidae
- Genus: Anthene
- Species: A. lasti

Binomial name
- Anthene lasti (Grose-Smith & Kirby, 1894)

Synonyms
- Lycaenesthes lasti Grose-Smith & Kirby, 1894; Anthene (Anthene) lasti

= Anthene lasti =

Last's hairtail

Species of butterfly

Anthene lasti, Last's hairtail, is a butterfly in the family Lycaenidae. It is found in Kenya (from the coast to the lower Meru Forest), eastern Tanzania, Malawi, Mozambique and eastern Zimbabwe. The habitat consists of forests.

Adults males are attracted to damp spots in large numbers. These spots are also visited by females, but to a lesser extent. Adults are on wing year round.
