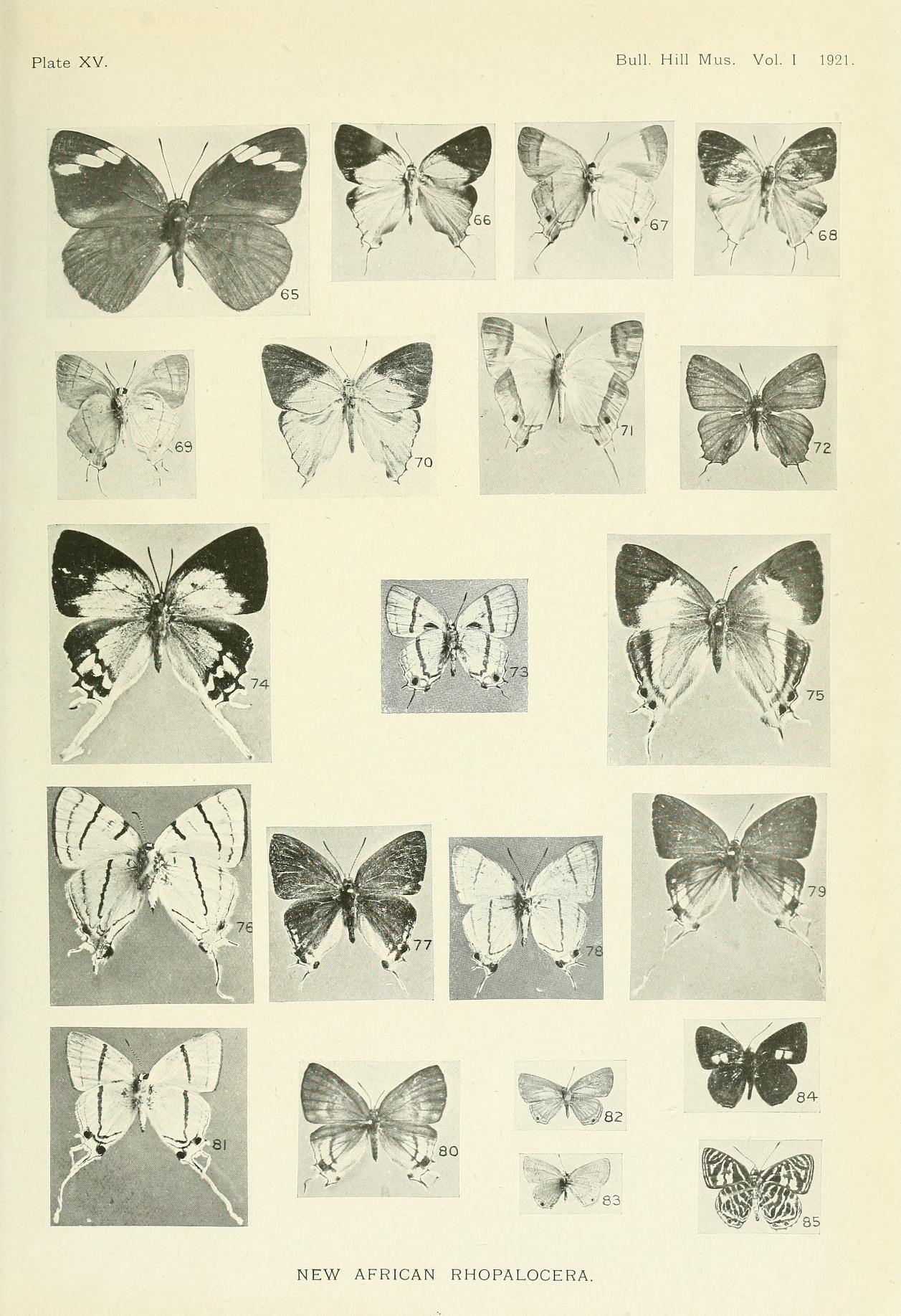
- Figs 84 male, 85 male under

Scientific classification
- Domain: Eukaryota
- Kingdom: Animalia
- Phylum: Arthropoda
- Class: Insecta
- Order: Lepidoptera
- Family: Lycaenidae
- Genus: Anthene
- Species: A. bipuncta

Binomial name
- Anthene bipuncta (Joicey & Talbot, 1921)

Synonyms
- Lycaenesthes bipuncta Joicey & Talbot, 1921; Anthene (Anthene) bipuncta

= Anthene bipuncta =

Species of butterfly

Anthene bipuncta is a butterfly in the family Lycaenidae. It is found in the Democratic Republic of the Congo (Uele, Équateur and Sankuru) and the Republic of the Congo.
