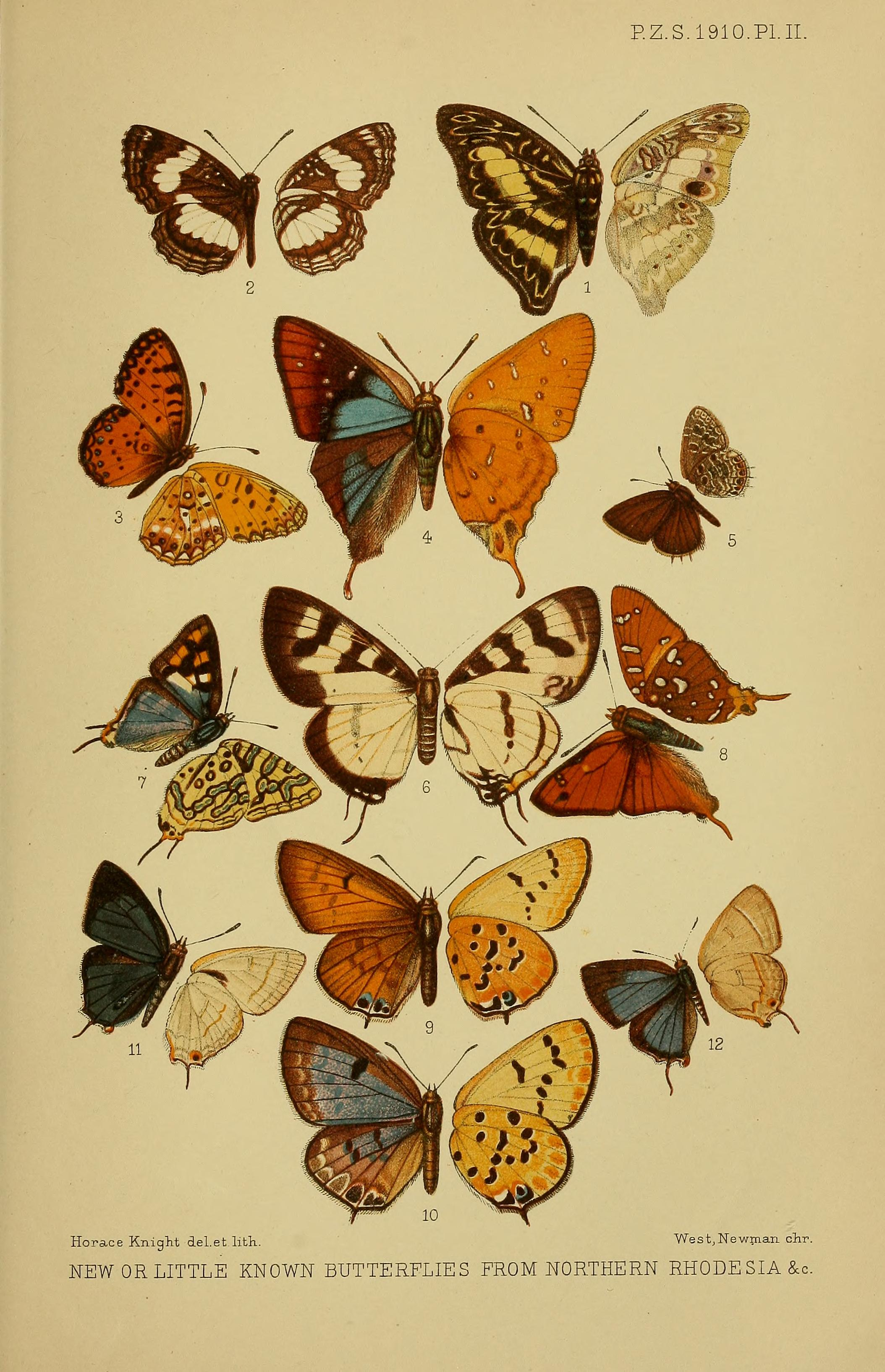
- Figure 5

Scientific classification
- Kingdom: Animalia
- Phylum: Arthropoda
- Clade: Pancrustacea
- Class: Insecta
- Order: Lepidoptera
- Family: Lycaenidae
- Genus: Anthene
- Species: A. gemmifera

Binomial name
- Anthene gemmifera (Neave, 1910)

Synonyms
- Lycaenesthes gemmifera Neave, 1910; Anthene (Neurellipes) gemmifera; Monile pluricauda Ungemach, 1932

= Anthene gemmifera =

Jewelled ciliate blue

Species of butterfly

Anthene gemmifera, the jewelled ciliate blue, is a butterfly in the family Lycaenidae. It is found in Sierra Leone, Ghana, Cameroon, Ethiopia, Uganda, south-western Kenya and along the coast, Tanzania and Zambia. The habitat consists of the forest/savanna transition zone and deciduous woodland.

Adult males mud-puddle.
