= Anthene helpsi =

Creamy ciliate blue

Scientific classification
- Domain: Eukaryota
- Kingdom: Animalia
- Phylum: Arthropoda
- Class: Insecta
- Order: Lepidoptera
- Family: Lycaenidae
- Genus: Anthene
- Species: A. helpsi

Binomial name
- Anthene helpsi Larsen, 1994

Synonyms
- Anthene (Anthene) helpsi

Species of butterfly

Anthene helpsi, the creamy ciliate blue, is a butterfly in the family Lycaenidae. It is found in Ghana and possibly Ivory Coast. The habitat consists of dense upland evergreen forests.
