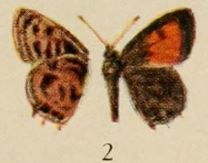

Scientific classification
- Kingdom: Animalia
- Phylum: Arthropoda
- Class: Insecta
- Order: Lepidoptera
- Family: Lycaenidae
- Genus: Anthene
- Species: A. lutzi

Binomial name
- Anthene lutzi (Holland, 1920)

Synonyms
- Triclema lutzi Holland, 1920; Anthene (Triclema) lutzi; Anthene ituriensis Joicey and Talbot, 1921

= Anthene lutzi =

Species of butterfly

Anthene lutzi is a butterfly in the family Lycaenidae. It is found in the Democratic Republic of the Congo (Uele, Ituri, Equateur, Sankuru, Kabinda and Lualaba).
