= Anthene buchholzi =

Scientific classification
- Kingdom: Animalia
- Phylum: Arthropoda
- Clade: Pancrustacea
- Class: Insecta
- Order: Lepidoptera
- Family: Lycaenidae
- Genus: Anthene
- Species: A. buchholzi

Binomial name
- Anthene buchholzi (Plötz, 1880)

Synonyms
- Lycaenesthes buchholzi Plötz, 1880; Anthene (Anthene) buchholzi

Species of butterfly

Anthene buchholzi is a butterfly in the family Lycaenidae. It is found in Cameroon.

In Seitz it is described - he upper surface of the male is of a plain bluish black, that of the female blackish brown with an oviform orange spot at some distance from the posterior margin and posterior angle of the forewing; at the margin of the hindwing there are in the cells 1 and 2 one fine blue streak each, and in cell 2 an orange lunula turned towards it. The under surface is very similar to that of L. larydas, but it is remarkably distinguished from it by the costal margin of the forewing being white at the base and the oblique white line beside it, as well as by the two eye-spots at the margin of the hindwing being inwards bordered with orange Forewing 13 to 14 mm. Cameroon, near Victoria. — Although the description is insufficient for ascertaining the species, I am still convinced that it must be identical either with L. lachares or lysicles.This question can only be solved by examining the typical specimen in the Greifswald Museum. Bethune-Baker wrongly translated the description of the and thereby made it unintelligible.
