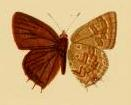

Scientific classification
- Kingdom: Animalia
- Phylum: Arthropoda
- Clade: Pancrustacea
- Class: Insecta
- Order: Lepidoptera
- Family: Lycaenidae
- Genus: Anthene
- Species: A. afra

Binomial name
- Anthene afra (Bethune-Baker, 1910)

Synonyms
- Lycaenesthes afra Bethune-Baker, 1910; Anthene (Anthene) afra; Lycaenesthes lysias Hulstaert, 1924

= Anthene afra =

Black-edged ciliate blue

Species of butterfly

Anthene afra, the black-edged ciliate blue, is a butterfly in the family Lycaenidae. It is found in eastern Nigeria, Cameroon, the Republic of the Congo, the Democratic Republic of the Congo (Uele, North Kivu and Lualaba), Rwanda, Burundi, Uganda, and north-western Tanzania. The habitat consists of forests.

Adult males mud-puddle.
