= Anthene uzungwae =

Scientific classification
- Kingdom: Animalia
- Phylum: Arthropoda
- Class: Insecta
- Order: Lepidoptera
- Family: Lycaenidae
- Genus: Anthene
- Species: A. uzungwae

Binomial name
- Anthene uzungwae Kielland, 1990

Synonyms
- Anthene (Anthene) uzungwae

Species of butterfly

Anthene uzungwae is a butterfly in the family Lycaenidae. It is found from south-central Tanzania to the Udzungwa Mountains.
