= Anthene saddacus =

Scientific classification
- Kingdom: Animalia
- Phylum: Arthropoda
- Class: Insecta
- Order: Lepidoptera
- Family: Lycaenidae
- Genus: Anthene
- Species: A. saddacus

Binomial name
- Anthene saddacus (Talbot, 1935)

Synonyms
- Lycaenesthes saddacus Talbot, 1935; Anthene (Anthene) saddacus

Species of butterfly

Anthene saddacus is a butterfly in the family Lycaenidae. It is found in Ethiopia.
