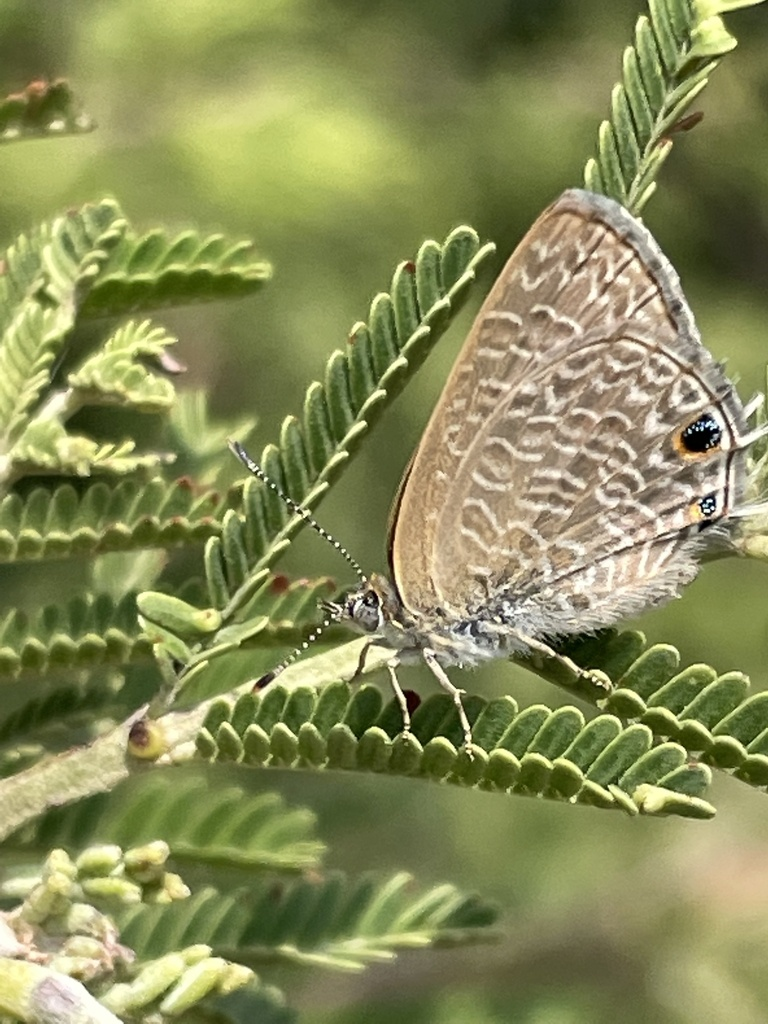

Scientific classification
- Kingdom: Animalia
- Phylum: Arthropoda
- Class: Insecta
- Order: Lepidoptera
- Family: Lycaenidae
- Genus: Anthene
- Species: A. suquala

Binomial name
- Anthene suquala (Pagenstecher, 1902)

Synonyms
- Lycaenesthes suquala Pagenstecher, 1902; Anthene (Anthene) suquala

= Anthene suquala =

Species of butterfly

Anthene suquala is a butterfly in the family Lycaenidae. It is found in Ethiopia.
