= Anthene ukerewensis =

Scientific classification
- Kingdom: Animalia
- Phylum: Arthropoda
- Class: Insecta
- Order: Lepidoptera
- Family: Lycaenidae
- Genus: Anthene
- Species: A. ukerewensis

Binomial name
- Anthene ukerewensis (Strand, 1909)

Synonyms
- Lycaenesthes ukerewensis Strand, 1909; Anthene (Anthene) ukerewensis

Species of butterfly

Anthene ukerewensis is a butterfly in the family Lycaenidae. It is found in Tanzania.
