= Anthene katera =

Scientific classification
- Domain: Eukaryota
- Kingdom: Animalia
- Phylum: Arthropoda
- Class: Insecta
- Order: Lepidoptera
- Family: Lycaenidae
- Genus: Anthene
- Species: A. katera

Binomial name
- Anthene katera Talbot, 1937

Synonyms
- Anthene (Anthene) katera

Species of butterfly

Anthene katera is a butterfly in the family Lycaenidae. It is found in the north-eastern part of the Democratic Republic of the Congo, Uganda and north-western Tanzania. The habitat consists of forests.
