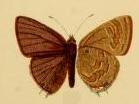

Scientific classification
- Domain: Eukaryota
- Kingdom: Animalia
- Phylum: Arthropoda
- Class: Insecta
- Order: Lepidoptera
- Family: Lycaenidae
- Genus: Anthene
- Species: A. nigropunctata

Binomial name
- Anthene nigropunctata (Bethune-Baker, 1910)

Synonyms
- Lycaenesthes nigropunctata Bethune-Baker, 1910; Anthene (Anthene) nigropunctata

= Anthene nigropunctata =

Black-spotted hairtail

Species of butterfly

Anthene nigropunctata, the black-spotted hairtail, is a butterfly in the family Lycaenidae. It is found in the Democratic Republic of the Congo (Uele and Lualaba), Angola, Tanzania, Malawi, northern Zambia and Zimbabwe.

Adults have been recorded from October to December in Zambia and in March at Chinhoyi in Zimbabwe.
