= Anthene mpanda =

Scientific classification
- Domain: Eukaryota
- Kingdom: Animalia
- Phylum: Arthropoda
- Class: Insecta
- Order: Lepidoptera
- Family: Lycaenidae
- Genus: Anthene
- Species: A. mpanda

Binomial name
- Anthene mpanda Kielland, 1990

Synonyms
- Anthene (Anthene) mpanda

Species of butterfly

Anthene mpanda is a butterfly in the family Lycaenidae. It is found in Tanzania (from the western part of the country to the Mpanda District), Zambia and north-eastern Zimbabwe. The habitat consists of savanna.

Adults have been recorded in September and February.
