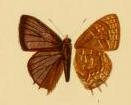

Scientific classification
- Domain: Eukaryota
- Kingdom: Animalia
- Phylum: Arthropoda
- Class: Insecta
- Order: Lepidoptera
- Family: Lycaenidae
- Genus: Anthene
- Species: A. alberta

Binomial name
- Anthene alberta (Bethune-Baker, 1910)

Synonyms
- Lycaenesthes alberta Bethune-Baker, 1910; Anthene (Anthene) alberta

= Anthene alberta =

Species of butterfly

Anthene alberta is a butterfly in the family Lycaenidae. It is found in the Democratic Republic of Congo (Uele, Ituri and Tanganika), Angola, Uganda, Tanzania, and western Kenya. The habitat consists of primary forests.
