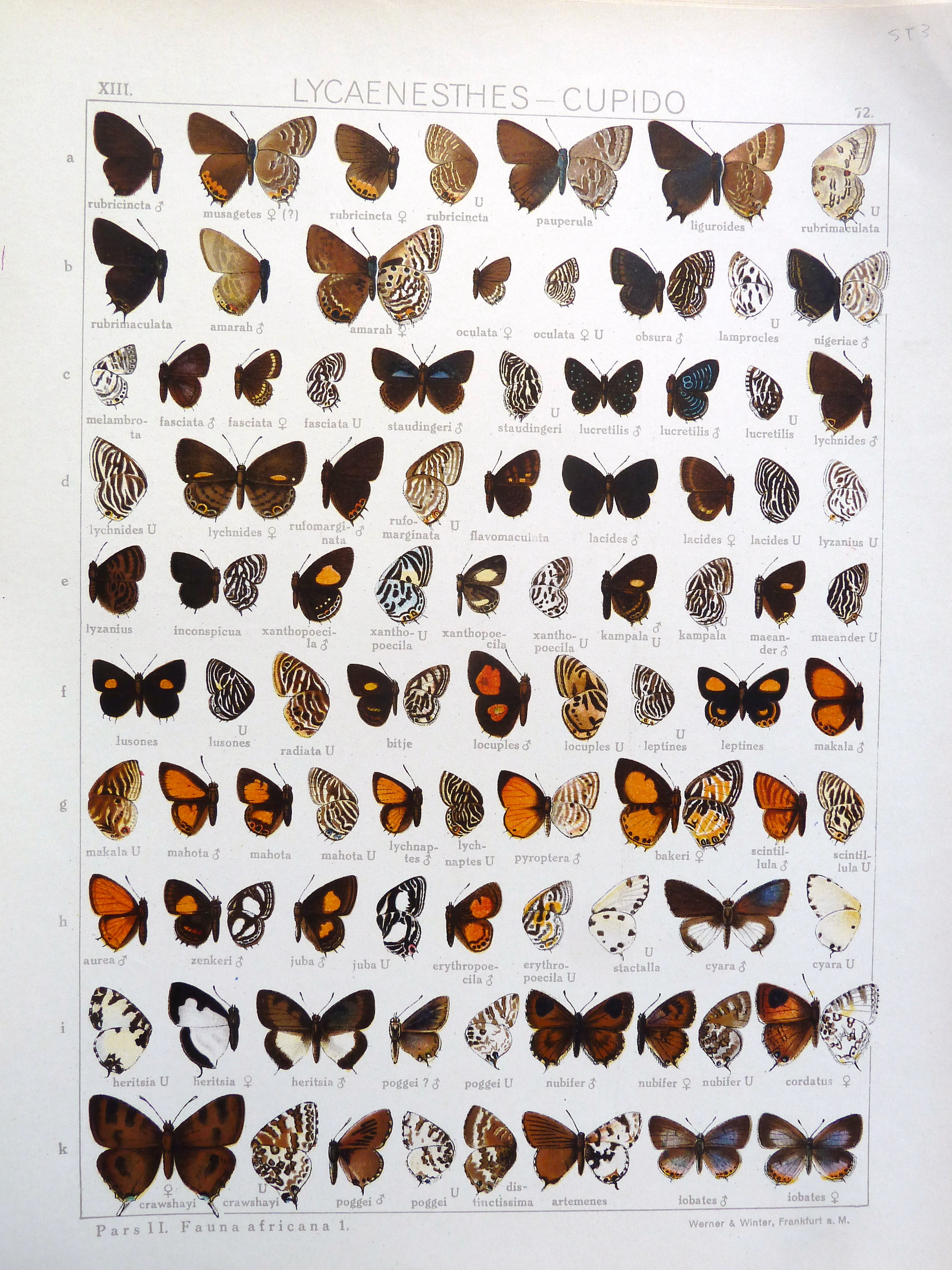
- e

Scientific classification
- Kingdom: Animalia
- Phylum: Arthropoda
- Clade: Pancrustacea
- Class: Insecta
- Order: Lepidoptera
- Family: Lycaenidae
- Genus: Neurellipes
- Species: N. kampala

Binomial name
- Neurellipes kampala (Bethune-Baker, 1910)

Synonyms
- Lycaenesthes kampala Bethune-Baker, 1910; Anthene (Anthene) kampala

= Neurellipes kampala =

Kampala ciliate blue

Species of butterfly

Neurellipes kampala, formerly Anthene kampala, the Kampala ciliate blue, is a butterfly in the family Lycaenidae. It is found in the Republic of the Congo, the Democratic Republic of the Congo (Mongala, Uele, Tshopo, Kinshasa and Sankuru), Uganda and possibly eastern Nigeria and Cameroon. The habitat consists of forests.

Torben Larsen developed a species numbering system for his 2005 publication Butterflies of West Africa. This species, then Anthene kampala is #534B. The 'Larsen' numbers have since been used with permission in A Sharp Eye on Butterflies of Ghana.
