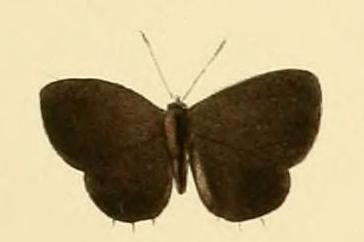

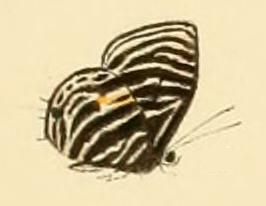

Scientific classification
- Domain: Eukaryota
- Kingdom: Animalia
- Phylum: Arthropoda
- Class: Insecta
- Order: Lepidoptera
- Family: Lycaenidae
- Genus: Anthene
- Species: A. lacides

Binomial name
- Anthene lacides (Hewitson, 1874)

Synonyms
- Lycaenesthes lacides Hewitson, 1874; Anthene (Triclema) lacides

= Anthene lacides =

Delicate ciliate blue

Species of butterfly

Anthene lacides, the delicate ciliate blue, is a butterfly in the family Lycaenidae. It is found in Nigeria (south and the Cross River loop), Cameroon, Gabon, the Republic of the Congo, Angola and the Democratic Republic of the Congo (Tshopo).
