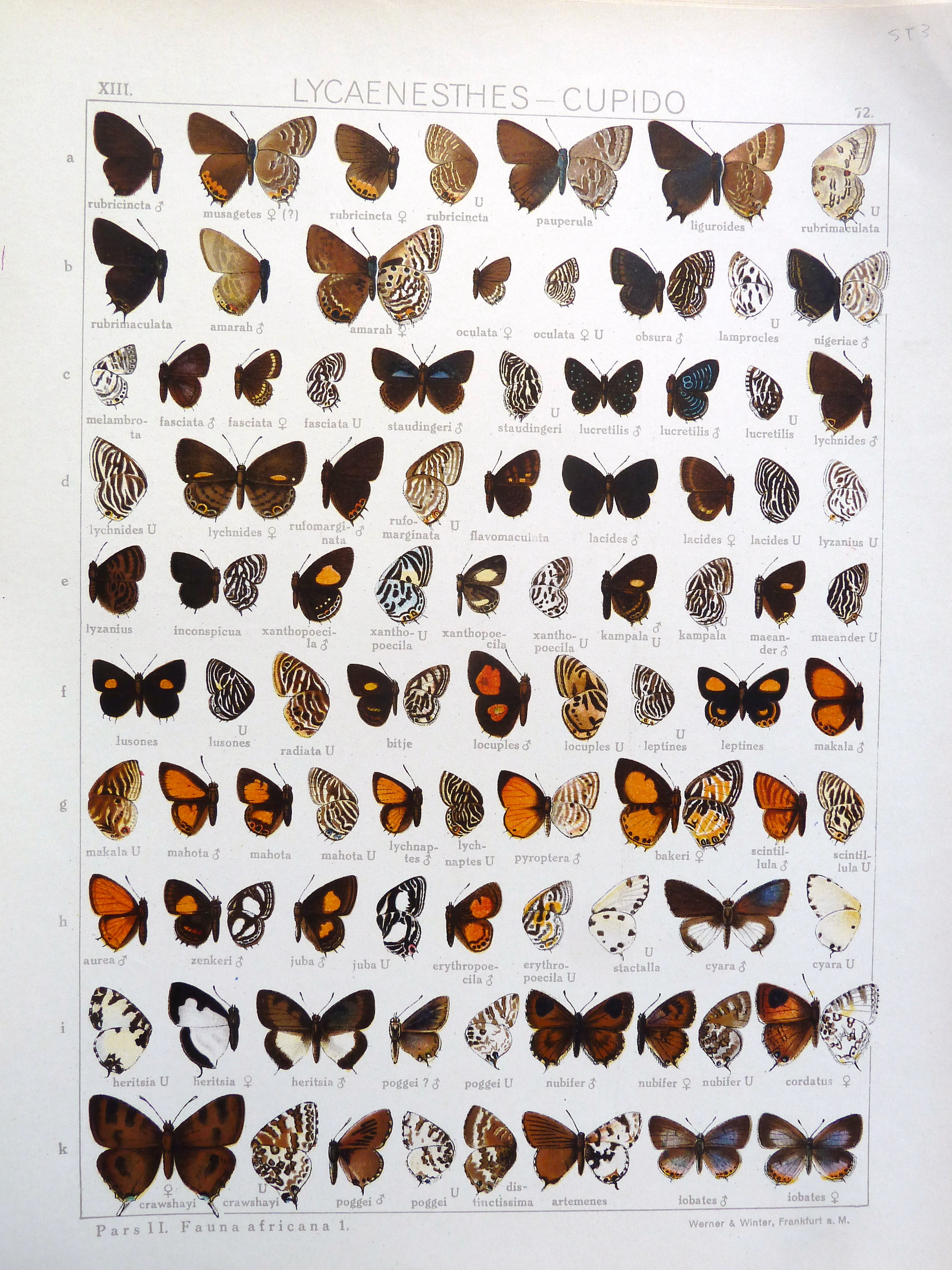

Scientific classification
- Kingdom: Animalia
- Phylum: Arthropoda
- Clade: Pancrustacea
- Class: Insecta
- Order: Lepidoptera
- Family: Lycaenidae
- Genus: Neurellipes
- Species: N. erythropoecilus

Binomial name
- Neurellipes erythropoecilus (Holland, 1893)

Synonyms
- Lycaenesthes erythropoecilus Holland, 1893; Anthene (Anthene) erythropoecilus

= Neurellipes erythropoecilus =

Species of butterfly

Neurellipes erythropoecilus, formerly Anthene erythropoecilus, is a butterfly in the family Lycaenidae. It is found in West Africa, including Gabon and Ghana, where the subspecies is locuples.

Torben Larsen developed a species numbering system for his 2005 publication Butterflies of West Africa. The species, described as Anthene erythropoecilus, is #534. The 'Larsen' numbers have since been used with permission in A Sharp Eye on Butterflies of Ghana.
