= Anthene inconspicua =

Inconspicuous ciliate blue

Scientific classification
- Domain: Eukaryota
- Kingdom: Animalia
- Phylum: Arthropoda
- Class: Insecta
- Order: Lepidoptera
- Family: Lycaenidae
- Genus: Anthene
- Species: A. inconspicua

Binomial name
- Anthene inconspicua (H. H. Druce, 1910)

Synonyms
- Triclema inconspicua H. H. Druce, 1910; Anthene (Triclema) inconspicua

Species of butterfly

Anthene inconspicua, the inconspicuous ciliate blue, is a butterfly in the family Lycaenidae. The species was first described by Hamilton Herbert Druce in 1910. It is found in Ivory Coast, Ghana, eastern Nigeria, Cameroon, the Democratic Republic of the Congo (Mongala, Uele and Lualaba), Uganda and north-western Tanzania. The habitat consists of forests.
