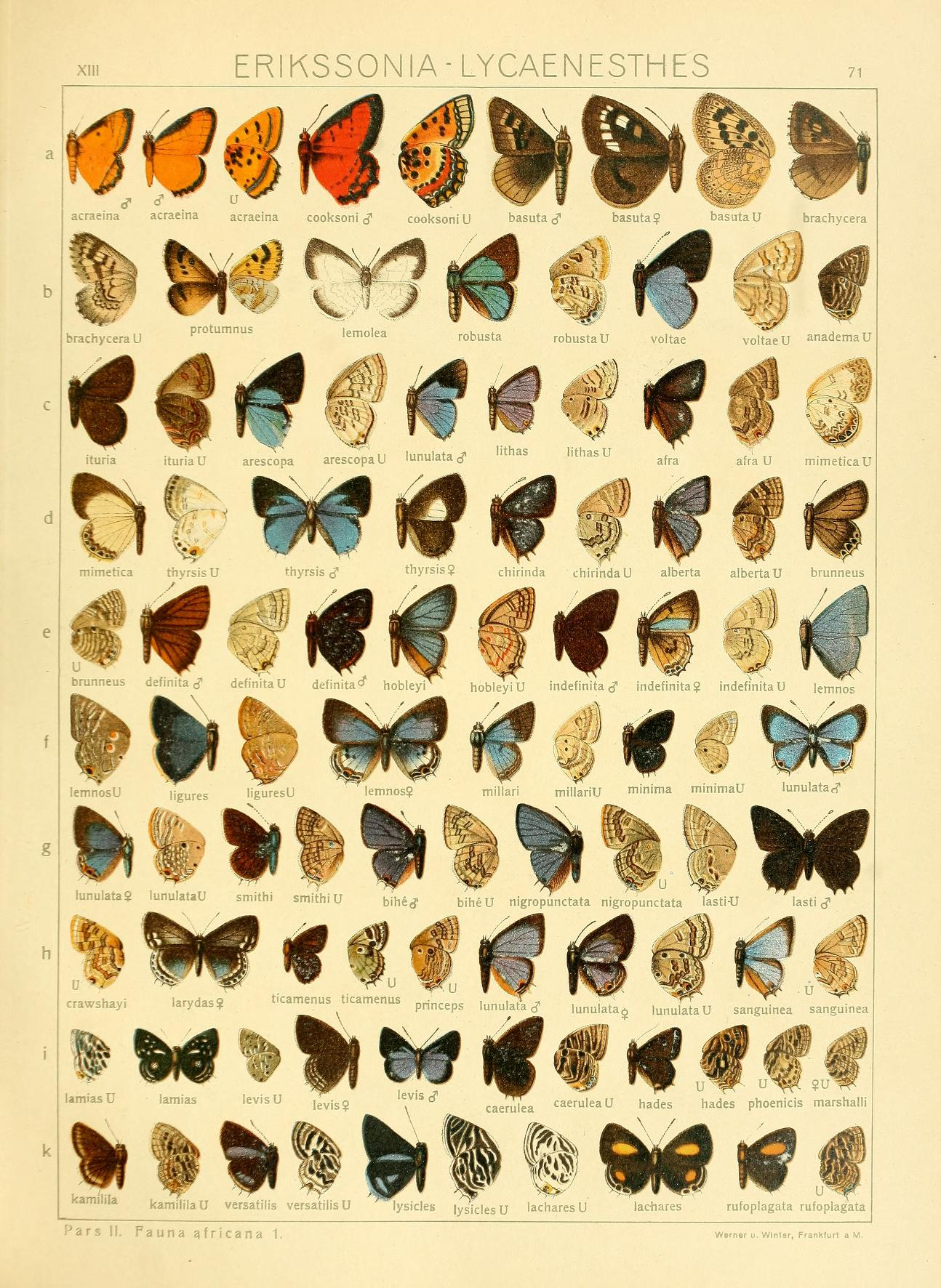
- Anthene and related genera in Adalbert Seitz's Fauna Africana

Scientific classification
- Kingdom: Animalia
- Phylum: Arthropoda
- Clade: Pancrustacea
- Class: Insecta
- Order: Lepidoptera
- Family: Lycaenidae
- Tribe: Lycaenesthini
- Genus: Anthene; Doubleday, 1847

Synonyms
- Lycaenesthes Moore, [1866]; Triclema Karsch, 1893; Neurypexina Bethune-Baker, 1910; Neurellipes Bethune-Baker, 1910; Monile Ungemach, 1932; Pseudoliptena Stempffer, 1946

= Anthene =

Butterfly genus in family Lycaenidae

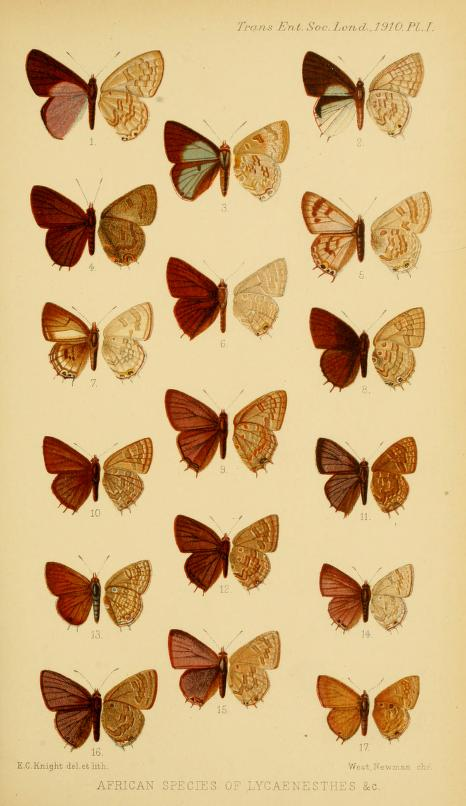
Anthenes as Lycaenesthes Bethune-Baker, 1910 Transactions of the Entomological Society of London

Anthene is a genus of butterflies in the family Lycaenidae, commonly called the ciliate blues or hairtails. The genus was erected by Edward Doubleday in 1847.

Anthene are small to medium-sized (wingspan 16–40 millimetres), slender butterflies without tails or with 2–3 short, hairy tails on the hindwing. The upper parts are dark brown, in males often with a blue or blue-violet metallic sheen that is usually not as strong as in many other blues. Other species have orange, or less often, white patches. Females are more uniformly brown. The underparts are light brown, often with white-edged transverse bands, but without or with few dark spots.

The larvae can live on a variety of shrubs and trees, but are often found on the acacia genus (Acacia). Some of the species are associated with ants. The ants collect the young larvae and carry them back to the nest, where they are fed and cared for, in return they secrete substances that the ants like.

Distribution Most of the species live in Africa, but there is also a group in Southeast Asia (north to the Himalayas) and Australia.

The genera Neurellipes, Neurypexina, and Triclema are often considered subgenera of Anthene.

== Subgenera and species ==
Listed alphabetically within subgenera:

- Subgenus Anthene Doubleday, 1847 (Afrotropical realm)
  - Anthene abruptus (Gaede, 1915)
  - Anthene afra (Bethune-Baker, 1910)
  - Anthene alberta (Bethune-Baker, 1910)
  - Anthene amarah (Guérin-Méneville, 1847) – black-striped hairtail
  - Anthene arnoldi (N. Jones, 1917)
  - Anthene arora Larsen, 1983
  - Anthene atewa Larsen & Collins, 1998
  - Anthene aurobrunnea (Ungemach, 1932)
  - Anthene bakeri (H. H. Druce, 1910)
  - Anthene barnesi Stevenson, 1940
  - Anthene bipuncta (Joicey & Talbot, 1921)
  - Anthene bjoernstadi Collins & Larsen, 1991
  - Anthene buchholzi (Plötz, 1880)
  - Anthene butleri (Oberthür, 1880) – pale hairtail
  - Anthene chirinda (Bethune-Baker, 1910)
  - Anthene collinsi D'Abrera, 1980
  - Anthene contrastata Ungemach, 1932 – mashuna hairtail
  - Anthene crawshayi (Butler, 1899)
  - Anthene definita (Butler, 1899) – common hairtail
  - Anthene discimacula (Joicey & Talbot, 1921)
  - Anthene emkopoti Larsen & Collins, 1998
  - Anthene erythropoecilus (Holland, 1893)
  - Anthene flavomaculatus (Grose-Smith & Kirby, 1893)
  - Anthene helpsi Larsen, 1994
  - Anthene hobleyi (Neave, 1904)
  - Anthene hodsoni (Talbot, 1935)
  - Anthene indefinita (Bethune-Baker, 1910)
  - Anthene irumu (Stempffer, 1948)
  - Anthene ituria (Bethune-Baker, 1910)
  - Anthene janna Gabriel, 1949
  - Anthene juanitae Henning & Henning, 1993 – Juanita's hairtail
  - Anthene juba (Fabricius, 1787)
  - Anthene kampala (Bethune-Baker, 1910)
  - Anthene katera Talbot, 1937
  - Anthene kersteni (Gerstaecker, 1871) – Kersten's hairtail
  - Anthene kikuyu (Bethune-Baker, 1910)
  - Anthene lachares (Hewitson, [1878])
  - Anthene larydas (Cramer, [1780])
  - Anthene lasti (Grose-Smith & Kirby, 1894)
  - Anthene lemnos (Hewitson, 1878) – large hairtail
  - Anthene leptala (Courvoisier, 1914)
  - Anthene leptines (Hewitson, 1874)
  - Anthene levis (Hewitson, 1878)
  - Anthene ligures (Hewitson, 1874)
  - Anthene lindae Henning & Henning, 1994 – Linda's hairtail
  - Anthene liodes (Hewitson, 1874) – liodes hairtail
  - Anthene locuples (Grose-Smith, 1898)
  - Anthene lunulata (Trimen, 1894)
  - Anthene lychnaptes (Holland, 1891)
  - Anthene lychnides (Hewitson, 1878)
  - Anthene lysicles (Hewitson, 1874)
  - Anthene madibirensis (Wichgraf, 1921)
  - Anthene mahota (Grose-Smith, 1887)
  - Anthene makala (Bethune-Baker, 1910)
  - Anthene melambrotus (Holland, 1893)
  - Anthene millari (Trimen, 1893) – Millar's hairtail
  - Anthene minima (Trimen, 1893) – little hairtail
  - Anthene montana Kielland, 1990
  - Anthene mpanda Kielland, 1990
  - Anthene ngoko Stempffer, 1962
  - Anthene nigropunctata (Bethune-Baker, 1910)
  - Anthene onias (Hulstaert, 1924)
  - Anthene opalina Stempffer, 1946
  - Anthene otacilia (Trimen, 1868) – Otacilia hairtail or Trimen's ciliate blue
  - Anthene pitmani Stempffer, 1936
  - Anthene princeps (Butler, 1876) – cupreous hairtail
  - Anthene pyroptera (Aurivillius, 1895)
  - Anthene radiata (Bethune-Baker, 1910)
  - Anthene ramnika D'Abrera, 1980
  - Anthene rhodesiana Stempffer, 1962
  - Anthene rothschildi (Aurivillius, 1922)
  - Anthene rubricinctus (Holland, 1891)
  - Anthene rubrimaculata (Strand, 1909)
  - Anthene rufomarginata (Bethune-Baker, 1910)
  - Anthene ruwenzoricus (Grünberg, 1911)
  - Anthene saddacus (Talbot, 1935)
  - Anthene schoutedeni (Hulstaert, 1924)
  - Anthene scintillula (Holland, 1891)
  - Anthene sheppardi Stevenson, 1940
  - Anthene starki Larsen, 2005
  - Anthene suquala (Pagenstecher, 1902)
  - Anthene sylvanus (Drury, 1773)
  - Anthene talboti Stempffer, 1936 – Talbot's hairtail
  - Anthene ukerewensis (Strand, 1909)
  - Anthene uzungwae Kielland, 1990
  - Anthene versatilis (Bethune-Baker, 1910)
  - Anthene wilsoni (Talbot, 1935)
  - Anthene xanthopoecilus (Holland, 1893)
  - Anthene zenkeri (Karsch, 1895)
- Subgenus Anthene Doubleday, 1847; Australasia-species group (Indomalayan realm, Australasian realm, Himalayan area in the Palearctic realm):
  - Anthene emolus (Godart, [1824]) – ciliate blue
  - Anthene licates (Hewitson, 1874)
  - Anthene lycaenina (R. Felder, 1868) – pointed ciliate blue
  - Anthene lycaenolus Tite, 1966
  - Anthene lycaenoides (Felder, 1860)
  - Anthene paraffinis (Fruhstorfer, 1916)
  - Anthene philo Hopffer, 1874
  - Anthene seltuttus (Röber, 1886)
  - Anthene villosa (Snellen, 1878)
- Subgenus Neurellipes Bethune-Baker, 1910 Afrotropical realm
  - Anthene aequatorialis Stempffer, 1962
  - Anthene chryseostictus (Bethune-Baker, 1910)
  - Anthene fulvus Stempffer, 1962
  - Anthene gemmifera (Neave, 1910)
  - Anthene likouala Stempffer, 1962
  - Anthene lusones (Hewitson, 1874)
  - Anthene staudingeri (Grose-Smith & Kirby, 1894)
- Subgenus Neurypexina Bethune-Baker, 1910 Afrotropical realm
  - Anthene kalinzu (Stempffer, 1950)
  - Anthene lamprocles (Hewitson, 1878)
  - Anthene lyzanius (Hewitson, 1874)
  - Anthene quadricaudata (Bethune-Baker, 1926)
- Subgenus Triclema Karsch, 1893 Afrotropical realm
  - Anthene africana (Bethune-Baker, 1926)
  - Anthene coerulea (Aurivillius, 1895)
  - Anthene fasciatus (Aurivillius, 1895)
  - Anthene hades (Bethune-Baker, 1910)
  - Anthene inconspicua (H. H. Druce, 1910)
  - Anthene inferna (Bethune-Baker, 1926)
  - Anthene kamilila (Bethune-Baker, 1910)
  - Anthene kimboza (Kielland, 1990)
  - Anthene krokosua (Larsen, 2005)
  - Anthene lacides (Hewitson, 1874)
  - Anthene lamias (Hewitson, 1878)
  - Anthene lucretilis (Hewitson, 1874)
  - Anthene lutzi (Holland, 1920)
  - Anthene marshalli (Bethune-Baker, 1903)
  - Anthene nigeriae (Aurivillius, 1905)
  - Anthene obscura (H. H. Druce, 1910)
  - Anthene oculatus (Grose-Smith & Kirby, 1893)
  - Anthene phoenicis (Karsch, 1893)
  - Anthene rufoplagata (Bethune-Baker, 1910)
  - Anthene tisamenus (Holland, 1891)
- Subgenus unknown
  - Anthene georgiadisi Larsen, 2009
