= List of butterflies of Gabon =

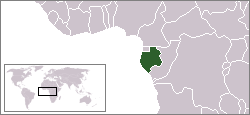
Location of Gabon

This is a list of butterflies of Gabon. About 667 species are known from Gabon, 24 of which are endemic.

== Papilionidae ==
=== Papilioninae ===
==== Papilionini ====
- Papilio antimachus Drury, 1782
- Papilio zalmoxis Hewitson, 1864
- Papilio nireus Linnaeus, 1758
- Papilio chrapkowskoides nurettini Koçak, 1983
- Papilio sosia pulchra Berger, 1950
- Papilio dardanus Brown, 1776
- Papilio phorcas congoanus Rothschild, 1896

==== Leptocercini ====
- Graphium antheus (Cramer, 1779)
- Graphium policenes (Cramer, 1775)
- Graphium biokoensis (Gauthier, 1984)
- Graphium policenoides (Holland, 1892)
- Graphium colonna (Ward, 1873)
- Graphium illyris hamatus (Joicey & Talbot, 1918)
- Graphium ridleyanus (White, 1843)
- Graphium leonidas (Fabricius, 1793)
- Graphium tynderaeus (Fabricius, 1793)
- Graphium latreillianus theorini (Aurivillius, 1881)
- Graphium auriger (Butler, 1876)
- Graphium fulleri boulleti (Le Cerf, 1912)
- Graphium hachei (Dewitz, 1881)
- Graphium ucalegon (Hewitson, 1865)
- Graphium simoni (Aurivillius, 1899)

== Pieridae ==
=== Pseudopontiinae ===
- Pseudopontia paradoxa (Felder & Felder, 1869)

=== Coliadinae ===
- Eurema brigitta (Stoll, [1780])
- Eurema hecabe solifera (Butler, 1875)
- Catopsilia florella (Fabricius, 1775)

=== Pierinae ===
- Colotis celimene sudanicus (Aurivillius, 1905)
- Leptosia alcesta (Stoll, [1782])
- Leptosia hybrida Bernardi, 1952
- Leptosia marginea (Mabille, 1890)
- Leptosia nupta (Butler, 1873)

==== Pierini ====
- Appias epaphia (Cramer, [1779])
- Appias perlucens (Butler, 1898)
- Appias sabina (Felder & Felder, [1865])
- Mylothris asphodelus Butler, 1888
- Mylothris basalis Aurivillius, 1906
- Mylothris bernice (Hewitson, 1866)
- Mylothris chloris (Fabricius, 1775)
- Mylothris elodina Talbot, 1944
- Mylothris nubila (Möschler, 1884)
- Mylothris rembina (Plötz, 1880)
- Dixeia capricornus falkensteinii (Dewitz, 1879)
- Dixeia cebron (Ward, 1871)
- Belenois aurota (Fabricius, 1793)
- Belenois solilucis Butler, 1874
- Belenois theuszi (Dewitz, 1889)

== Lycaenidae ==
=== Miletinae ===
==== Liphyrini ====
- Euliphyra mirifica Holland, 1890
- Euliphyra leucyania (Hewitson, 1874)
- Aslauga aura Druce, 1913
- Aslauga confusa Libert, 1994
- Aslauga purpurascens Holland, 1890
- Aslauga vininga (Hewitson, 1875)

==== Miletini ====
- Megalopalpus simplex Röber, 1886
- Megalopalpus zymna (Westwood, 1851)
- Spalgis lemolea Druce, 1890
- Lachnocnema emperamus (Snellen, 1872)
- Lachnocnema divergens Gaede, 1915
- Lachnocnema reutlingeri Holland, 1892
- Lachnocnema luna Druce, 1910
- Lachnocnema exiguus Holland, 1890

=== Poritiinae ===
==== Liptenini ====
- Ptelina carnuta (Hewitson, 1873)
- Pentila maculata pardalena Druce, 1910
- Pentila amenaidoides (Holland, 1893)
- Pentila cloetensi aspasia Grünberg, 1910
- Pentila glagoessa (Holland, 1893)
- Pentila hewitsoni limbata (Holland, 1893)
- Pentila occidentalium gabunica Stempffer & Bennett, 1961
- Pentila pauli leopardina Schultze, 1923
- Pentila rotha Hewitson, 1873
- Pentila tachyroides Dewitz, 1879
- Pentila torrida (Kirby, 1887)
- Pentila umbra Holland, 1892
- Telipna albofasciata Aurivillius, 1910
- Telipna cameroonensis Jackson, 1969
- Telipna atrinervis Hulstaert, 1924
- Telipna villiersi Stempffer, 1965
- Telipna hollandi exsuperia Hulstaert, 1924
- Telipna transverstigma Druce, 1910
- Telipna sanguinea (Plötz, 1880)
- Telipna erica Suffert, 1904
- Telipna ruspinoides Schultze, 1923
- Ornipholidotos kirbyi (Aurivillius. 1895)
- Ornipholidotos ugandae goodi Libert, 2000
- Ornipholidotos bitjeensis Stempffer, 1957
- Ornipholidotos gabonensis Stempffer, 1947
- Ornipholidotos bakotae Stempffer, 1962
- Ornipholidotos ayissii Libert, 2005
- Ornipholidotos annae Libert, 2005
- Ornipholidotos evoei Libert, 2005
- Ornipholidotos overlaeti fontainei Libert, 2005
- Ornipholidotos congoensis Stempffer, 1964
- Ornipholidotos jacksoni occidentalis Libert, 2005
- Ornipholidotos irwini Collins & Larsen, 1998
- Ornipholidotos tirza (Hewitson, 1873)
- Ornipholidotos perfragilis (Holland, 1890)
- Ornipholidotos sylphida (Staudinger, 1892)
- Torbenia aurivilliusi (Stempffer, 1967)
- Torbenia persimilis Libert, 2000
- Mimacraea darwinia Butler, 1872
- Mimacraea apicalis gabonica Libert, 2000
- Mimeresia cellularis (Kirby, 1890)
- Mimeresia debora (Kirby, 1890)
- Mimeresia favillacea (Grünberg, 1910)
- Mimeresia libentina (Hewitson, 1866)
- Mimeresia moreelsi tessmanni (Grünberg, 1910)
- Liptena bolivari Kheil, 1905
- Liptena catalina (Grose-Smith & Kirby, 1887)
- Liptena decipiens leucostola (Holland, 1890)
- Liptena despecta (Holland, 1890)
- Liptena evanescens (Kirby, 1887)
- Liptena fatima (Kirby, 1890)
- Liptena flavicans praeusta Schultze, 1917
- Liptena modesta (Kirby, 1890)
- Liptena opaca gabunica Stempffer, Bennett & May, 1974
- Liptena orubrum (Holland, 1890)
- Liptena similis (Kirby, 1890)
- Liptena subundularis (Staudinger, 1892)
- Liptena turbata (Kirby, 1890)
- Liptena undularis Hewitson, 1866
- Liptena xanthostola (Holland, 1890)
- Obania tullia (Staudinger, 1892)
- Kakumia ideoides (Dewitz, 1887)
- Kakumia otlauga (Grose-Smith & Kirby, 1890)
- Tetrarhanis ilala etoumbi (Stempffer, 1964)
- Tetrarhanis laminifer Clench, 1965
- Tetrarhanis rougeoti (Stempffer, 1954)
- Falcuna campimus dilatata (Schultze, 1923)
- Falcuna lybia (Staudinger, 1892)
- Falcuna margarita (Suffert, 1904)
- Falcuna melandeta (Holland, 1893)
- Falcuna synesia gabonensis Stempffer & Bennett, 1963
- Larinopoda lagyra (Hewitson, 1866)
- Larinopoda lircaea (Hewitson, 1866)
- Larinopoda tera (Hewitson, 1873)
- Micropentila adelgitha (Hewitson, 1874)
- Micropentila adelgunda (Staudinger, 1892)
- Micropentila alberta (Staudinger, 1892)
- Micropentila brunnea centralis Bennett, 1966
- Micropentila cingulum Druce, 1910
- Micropentila dorothea Bethune-Baker, 1903
- Micropentila gabunica Stempffer & Bennett, 1965
- Micropentila ugandae Hawker-Smith, 1933
- Micropentila villiersi Stempffer, 1970
- Pseuderesia mapongua (Holland, 1893)
- Eresiomera cornucopiae (Holland, 1892)
- Eresina corynetes (Grose-Smith & Kirby, 1890)
- Eresina rougeoti Stempffer, 1956
- Eresiomera clenchi (Stempffer, 1961)
- Eresiomera cornucopiae (Holland, 1892)
- Eresiomera isca (Hewitson, 1873)
- Eresiomera mapongwa (Holland, 1893)
- Eresiomera osheba (Holland, 1890)
- Eresiomera rougeoti (Stempffer, 1961)
- Eresiomera rutilo (Druce, 1910)
- Citrinophila bennetti Jackson, 1967
- Citrinophila erastus (Hewitson, 1866)
- Citrinophila tenera (Kirby, 1887)
- Citrinophila terias Joicey & Talbot, 1921
- Argyrocheila undifera Staudinger, 1892

==== Epitolini ====
- Iridana exquisita (Grose-Smith, 1898)
- Iridana gabunica Stempffer, 1964
- Iridana rougeoti Stempffer, 1964
- Epitola posthumus (Fabricius, 1793)
- Epitola urania Kirby, 1887
- Cerautola ceraunia (Hewitson, 1873)
- Cerautola crowleyi leucographa Libert, 1999
- Cerautola miranda vidua (Talbot, 1935)
- Cerautola stempfferi (Jackson, 1962)
- Geritola gerina (Hewitson, 1878)
- Geritola goodii (Holland, 1890)
- Stempfferia annae Libert, 1999
- Stempfferia badura (Kirby, 1890)
- Stempfferia bouyeri Libert & Collins, 1999
- Stempfferia cercenoides (Holland, 1890)
- Stempfferia insulana (Aurivillius, 1923)
- Stempfferia congoana (Aurivillius, 1923)
- Stempfferia gordoni (Druce, 1903)
- Stempfferia iturina (Joicey & Talbot, 1921)
- Stempfferia marginata (Kirby, 1887)
- Stempfferia michelae centralis Libert, 1999
- Stempfferia similis Libert, 1999
- Stempfferia zelza (Hewitson, 1873)
- Cephetola catuna (Kirby, 1890)
- Cephetola cephena (Hewitson, 1873)
- Cephetola nigeriae (Jackson, 1962)
- Cephetola orientalis (Roche, 1954)
- Epitolina dispar (Kirby, 1887)
- Epitolina melissa (Druce, 1888)
- Epitolina larseni Libert, 2000
- Hypophytala benitensis (Holland, 1890)
- Hypophytala hyetta (Hewitson, 1873)
- Phytala elais Westwood, 1851
- Aethiopana honorius (Fabricius, 1793)
- Hewitsonia bitjeana Bethune-Baker, 1915
- Hewitsonia boisduvalii (Hewitson, 1869)
- Hewitsonia kirbyi Dewitz, 1879
- Hewitsonia similis (Aurivillius, 1891)
- Hewitsonia ugandae jolyana Bouyer, 1997

=== Aphnaeinae ===
- Pseudaletis zebra Holland, 1891
- Pseudaletis antimachus (Staudinger, 1888)
- Cigaritis crustaria (Holland, 1890)
- Cigaritis homeyeri (Dewitz, 1887)
- Aphnaeus argyrocyclus Holland, 1890
- Aphnaeus asterius Plötz, 1880
- Aphnaeus orcas (Drury, 1782)

=== Theclinae ===
- Syrmoptera amasa (Hewitson, 1869)
- Syrmoptera melanomitra Karsch, 1895
- Hypolycaena hatita Hewitson, 1865
- Hypolycaena lebona (Hewitson, 1865)
- Hypolycaena naara Hewitson, 1873
- Hypolycaena nigra Bethune-Baker, 1914
- Iolaus bolissus Hewitson, 1873
- Iolaus carina Hewitson, 1873
- Iolaus eurisus vexillarius Clench, 1964
- Iolaus aurivillii Röber, 1900
- Iolaus bellina exquisita (Riley, 1928)
- Iolaus coelestis Bethune-Baker, 1926
- Iolaus creta Hewitson, 1878
- Iolaus cytaeis Hewitson, 1875
- Iolaus iasis Hewitson, 1865
- Iolaus pollux Aurivillius, 1895
- Iolaus gabunica (Riley, 1928)
- Iolaus iulus Hewitson, 1869
- Iolaus parasilanus mabillei (Riley, 1928)
- Iolaus alcibiades Kirby, 1871
- Iolaus calisto (Westwood, 1851)
- Iolaus aequatorialis (Stempffer & Bennett, 1958)
- Iolaus timon (Fabricius, 1787)
- Pilodeudorix mimeta (Karsch, 1895)
- Pilodeudorix ula (Karsch, 1895)
- Pilodeudorix virgata (Druce, 1891)
- Pilodeudorix angelita (Suffert, 1904)
- Pilodeudorix aruma (Hewitson, 1873)
- Pilodeudorix mera (Hewitson, 1873)
- Pilodeudorix otraeda genuba (Hewitson, 1875)
- Pilodeudorix camerona (Plötz, 1880)
- Pilodeudorix congoana (Aurivillius, 1923)
- Pilodeudorix hugoi Libert, 2004
- Pilodeudorix corruscans (Aurivillius, 1898)
- Pilodeudorix violetta (Aurivillius, 1897)
- Paradeudorix cobaltina (Stempffer, 1964)
- Paradeudorix ituri (Bethune-Baker, 1908)
- Paradeudorix moyambina (Bethune-Baker, 1904)
- Hypomyrina fournierae Gabriel, 1939
- Deudorix galathea (Swainson, 1821)
- Deudorix lorisona (Hewitson, 1862)

=== Polyommatinae ===
==== Lycaenesthini ====
- Anthene erythropoecilus (Holland, 1893)
- Anthene lachares (Hewitson, 1878)
- Anthene leptines (Hewitson, 1874)
- Anthene ligures (Hewitson, 1874)
- Anthene liodes (Hewitson, 1874)
- Anthene lychnaptes (Holland, 1891)
- Anthene lysicles (Hewitson, 1874)
- Anthene mahota (Grose-Smith, 1887)
- Anthene melambrotus (Holland, 1893)
- Anthene pyroptera (Aurivillius, 1895)
- Anthene rubricinctus (Holland, 1891)
- Anthene scintillula (Holland, 1891)
- Anthene sylvanus (Drury, 1773)
- Anthene versatilis (Bethune-Baker, 1910)
- Anthene xanthopoecilus (Holland, 1893)
- Anthene lyzanius (Hewitson, 1874)
- Anthene lusones (Hewitson, 1874)
- Anthene staudingeri (Grose-Smith & Kirby, 1894)
- Anthene fasciatus (Aurivillius, 1895)
- Anthene hades (Bethune-Baker, 1910)
- Anthene lacides (Hewitson, 1874)
- Anthene lamias (Hewitson, 1878)
- Anthene lucretilis (Hewitson, 1874)
- Anthene obscura (Druce, 1910)
- Anthene oculatus (Grose-Smith & Kirby, 1893)
- Anthene rufoplagata (Bethune-Baker, 1910)
- Anthene tisamenus (Holland, 1891)
- Cupidesthes arescopa Bethune-Baker, 1910
- Cupidesthes leonina (Bethune-Baker, 1903)
- Cupidesthes lithas (Druce, 1890)
- Cupidesthes paludicola (Holland, 1891)
- Cupidesthes thyrsis (Kirby, 1878)

==== Polyommatini ====
- Cupidopsis cissus extensa Libert, 2003
- Pseudonacaduba aethiops (Mabille, 1877)
- Phlyaria cyara (Hewitson, 1876)
- Tuxentius carana (Hewitson, 1876)
- Thermoniphas alberici (Dufrane, 1945)
- Thermoniphas fontainei Stempffer, 1956
- Thermoniphas fumosa Stempffer, 1952
- Thermoniphas leucocyanea Clench, 1961
- Thermoniphas togara (Plötz, 1880)
- Oboronia ornata vestalis (Aurivillius, 1895)
- Oboronia pseudopunctatus (Strand, 1912)
- Lepidochrysops glauca (Trimen & Bowker, 1887)

== Riodinidae ==
=== Nemeobiinae ===
- Abisara caeca semicaeca Riley, 1932
- Abisara rutherfordii herwigii Dewitz, 1887
- Abisara gerontes gabunica Riley, 1932

== Nymphalidae ==
=== Danainae ===
==== Danaini ====
- Danaus chrysippus orientis (Aurivillius, 1909)
- Tirumala formosa morgeni (Honrath, 1892)
- Amauris niavius (Linnaeus, 1758)
- Amauris tartarea Mabille, 1876
- Amauris hyalites Butler, 1874
- Amauris inferna Butler, 1871
- Amauris vashti (Butler, 1869)

=== Satyrinae ===
==== Elymniini ====
- Elymniopsis bammakoo (Westwood, [1851])

==== Melanitini ====
- Gnophodes chelys (Fabricius, 1793)

==== Satyrini ====
- Bicyclus evadne elionias (Hewitson, 1866)
- Bicyclus hewitsoni (Doumet, 1861)
- Bicyclus howarthi Condamin, 1963
- Bicyclus ignobilis eurini Condamin & Fox, 1963
- Bicyclus italus (Hewitson, 1865)
- Bicyclus lamani (Aurivillius, 1900)
- Bicyclus madetes (Hewitson, 1874)
- Bicyclus mandanes Hewitson, 1873
- Bicyclus medontias (Hewitson, 1873)
- Bicyclus nobilis (Aurivillius, 1893)
- Bicyclus rhacotis (Hewitson, 1866)
- Bicyclus sambulos (Hewitson, 1877)
- Bicyclus sciathis (Hewitson, 1866)
- Bicyclus taenias (Hewitson, 1877)
- Bicyclus technatis (Hewitson, 1877)
- Bicyclus trilophus (Rebel, 1914)
- Bicyclus xeneas (Hewitson, 1866)
- Bicyclus xeneoides Condamin, 1961
- Heteropsis peitho (Plötz, 1880)
- Ypthima doleta Kirby, 1880
- Ypthima impura Elwes & Edwards, 1893

=== Charaxinae ===
==== Charaxini ====
- Charaxes fulvescens (Aurivillius, 1891)
- Charaxes protoclea protonothodes van Someren, 1971
- Charaxes boueti Feisthamel, 1850
- Charaxes cynthia kinduana Le Cerf, 1923
- Charaxes lucretius intermedius van Someren, 1971
- Charaxes jasius brunnescens Poulton, 1926
- Charaxes castor (Cramer, 1775)
- Charaxes brutus angustus Rothschild, 1900
- Charaxes eudoxus mechowi Rothschild, 1900
- Charaxes richelmanni Röber, 1936
- Charaxes numenes aequatorialis van Someren, 1972
- Charaxes tiridates tiridatinus Röber, 1936
- Charaxes bipunctatus ugandensis van Someren, 1972
- Charaxes mixtus Rothschild, 1894
- Charaxes smaragdalis Butler, 1866
- Charaxes ameliae Doumet, 1861
- Charaxes pythodoris occidens van Someren, 1963
- Charaxes hadrianus Ward, 1871
- Charaxes nobilis Druce, 1873
- Charaxes superbus Schultze, 1909
- Charaxes lydiae Holland, 1917
- Charaxes acraeoides Druce, 1908
- Charaxes fournierae Le Moult, 1930
- Charaxes etesipe (Godart, 1824)
- Charaxes bwete (Basquin, 2012)
- Charaxes eupale latimargo Joicey & Talbot, 1921
- Charaxes subornatus Schultze, 1916
- Charaxes anticlea proadusta van Someren, 1971
- Charaxes thysi Capronnier, 1889
- Charaxes taverniersi Berger, 1975
- Charaxes hildebrandti (Dewitz, 1879)
- Charaxes etheocles ochracea van Someren & Jackson, 1957
- Charaxes bocqueti oubanguiensis Minig, 1975
- Charaxes cedreatis Hewitson, 1874
- Charaxes kheili Staudinger, 1896
- Charaxes pleione congoensis Plantrou, 1989
- Charaxes paphianus Ward, 1871
- Charaxes kahldeni Homeyer & Dewitz, 1882
- Charaxes nichetes Grose-Smith, 1883
- Charaxes lycurgus bernardiana Plantrou, 1978
- Charaxes zelica rougeoti Plantrou, 1978
- Charaxes porthos Grose-Smith, 1883
- Charaxes mycerina nausicaa Staudinger, 1891

==== Euxanthini ====
- Charaxes eurinome ansellica (Butler, 1870)
- Charaxes eurinome celadon Le Cerf, 1923
- Charaxes crossleyi (Ward, 1871)
- Charaxes trajanus (Ward, 1871)

==== Pallini ====
- Palla publius centralis van Someren, 1975
- Palla ussheri dobelli (Hall, 1919)

=== Apaturinae ===
- Apaturopsis cleochares (Hewitson, 1873)

=== Nymphalinae ===
- Kallimoides rumia jadyae (Fox, 1968)
- Vanessula milca buechneri Dewitz, 1887

==== Nymphalini ====
- Junonia stygia (Aurivillius, 1894)
- Junonia terea (Drury, 1773)
- Salamis cacta (Fabricius, 1793)
- Protogoniomorpha parhassus (Drury, 1782)
- Precis octavia (Cramer, 1777)
- Hypolimnas anthedon (Doubleday, 1845)
- Hypolimnas dinarcha (Hewitson, 1865)
- Hypolimnas misippus (Linnaeus, 1764)
- Hypolimnas monteironis (Druce, 1874)
- Hypolimnas salmacis (Drury, 1773)

=== Biblidinae ===
==== Biblidini ====
- Mesoxantha ethosea ethoseoides Rebel, 1914
- Ariadne actisanes (Hewitson, 1875)
- Ariadne enotrea suffusa (Joicey & Talbot, 1921)
- Neptidopsis ophione (Cramer, 1777)

==== Epicaliini ====
- Sevenia amulia (Cramer, 1777)
- Sevenia occidentalium (Mabille, 1876)

=== Limenitinae ===
==== Limenitidini ====
- Cymothoe amenides (Hewitson, 1874)
- Cymothoe anitorgis (Hewitson, 1874)
- Cymothoe aramis (Hewitson, 1865)
- Cymothoe beckeri (Herrich-Schaeffer, 1858)
- Cymothoe capella (Ward, 1871)
- Cymothoe coccinata (Hewitson, 1874)
- Cymothoe confusa Aurivillius, 1887
- Cymothoe fumana balluca Fox & Howarth, 1968
- Cymothoe harmilla (Hewitson, 1874)
- Cymothoe haynae superba Aurivillius, 1899
- Cymothoe hesiodotus Staudinger, 1890
- Cymothoe hypatha (Hewitson, 1866)
- Cymothoe lucasii (Doumet, 1859)
- Cymothoe lurida hesione Weymer, 1907
- Cymothoe oemilius (Doumet, 1859)
- Cymothoe ogova (Plötz, 1880)
- Cymothoe reinholdi (Plötz, 1880)
- Pseudacraea boisduvalii (Doubleday, 1845)
- Pseudacraea clarkii Butler & Rothschild, 1892
- Pseudacraea dolomena (Hewitson, 1865)
- Pseudacraea rubrobasalis Aurivillius, 1903
- Pseudacraea eurytus (Linnaeus, 1758)
- Pseudacraea kuenowii gottbergi Dewitz, 1884
- Pseudacraea lucretia protracta (Butler, 1874)
- Pseudacraea semire (Cramer, 1779)

==== Neptidini ====
- Neptis agouale Pierre-Baltus, 1978
- Neptis continuata Holland, 1892
- Neptis dentifera Schultze, 1920
- Neptis matilei Pierre-Balthus, 20
- Neptis melicerta (Drury, 1773)
- Neptis metanira Holland, 1892
- Neptis mixophyes Holland, 1892
- Neptis morosa Overlaet, 1955
- Neptis nebrodes Hewitson, 1874
- Neptis nemetes margueriteae Fox, 1968
- Neptis nicobule Holland, 1892
- Neptis nicoteles Hewitson, 1874
- Neptis stellata Pierre-Baltus, 2007
- Neptis rosa Pierre-Baltus, 2007
- Neptis amieti Pierre-Baltus, 2007
- Neptis multiscoliata Pierre-Baltus, 2007
- Neptis mpassae Pierre-Baltus, 2007
- Neptis nigra Pierre-Baltus, 2007
- Neptis trigonophora melicertula Strand, 1912
- Neptis troundi Pierre-Baltus, 1978

==== Adoliadini ====
- Catuna angustatum (Felder & Felder, 1867)
- Catuna niji Fox, 1965
- Euryphura chalcis (Felder & Felder, 1860)
- Euryphura plautilla (Hewitson, 1865)
- Euryphura porphyrion grassei Bernardi, 1965
- Euryphaedra thauma Staudinger, 1891
- Harmilla elegans Aurivillius, 1892
- Aterica galene extensa Heron, 1909
- Cynandra opis bernardii Lagnel, 1967
- Euriphene abasa (Hewitson, 1866)
- Euriphene atropurpurea (Aurivillius, 1894)
- Euriphene atrovirens (Mabille, 1878)
- Euriphene barombina (Aurivillius, 1894)
- Euriphene camarensis (Ward, 1871)
- Euriphene gambiae gabonica Bernardi, 1966
- Euriphene glaucopis (Gaede, 1916)
- Euriphene grosesmithi (Staudinger, 1891)
- Euriphene karschi (Aurivillius, 1894)
- Euriphene minkoi Bernardi, 1993
- Euriphene mundula (Grünberg, 1910)
- Euriphene pinkieana Bernardi, 1975
- Euriphene plagiata (Aurivillius, 1897)
- Euriphene tadema (Hewitson, 1866)
- Euriphene doriclea (Drury, 1782)
- Euriphene lysandra (Stoll, 1790)
- Bebearia carshena (Hewitson, 1871)
- Bebearia micans (Aurivillius, 1899)
- Bebearia zonara (Butler, 1871)
- Bebearia mandinga (Felder & Felder, 1860)
- Bebearia oxione squalida (Talbot, 1928)
- Bebearia abesa (Hewitson, 1869)
- Bebearia cocalia katera (van Someren, 1939)
- Bebearia sophus (Fabricius, 1793)
- Bebearia staudingeri (Aurivillius, 1893)
- Bebearia plistonax (Hewitson, 1874)
- Bebearia elpinice (Hewitson, 1869)
- Bebearia congolensis (Capronnier, 1889)
- Bebearia laetitia (Plötz, 1880)
- Bebearia maximiana ata Hecq, 1990
- Bebearia nivaria (Ward, 1871)
- Bebearia phantasia concolor Hecq, 1988
- Bebearia demetra obsolescens (Talbot, 1928)
- Bebearia tessmanni (Grünberg, 1910)
- Bebearia cutteri cognata (Grünberg, 1910)
- Bebearia eliensis (Hewitson, 1866)
- Bebearia octogramma (Grose-Smith & Kirby, 1889)
- Bebearia castanea (Holland, 1893)
- Bebearia chilonis (Hewitson, 1874)
- Bebearia cinaethon (Hewitson, 1874)
- Bebearia faraveli Oremans, 1998
- Bebearia intermedia (Bartel, 1905)
- Bebearia ivindoensis van de Weghe, 2007
- Bebearia lopeensis van de Weghe, 2007
- Bebearia oremansi Hecq, 1994
- Bebearia tini Oremans, 1998
- Euphaedra luteofasciata Hecq, 1979
- Euphaedra imperialis gabonica Rothschild, 1918
- Euphaedra medon sanctanna Hecq, 1985
- Euphaedra medon celestis Hecq, 1986
- Euphaedra medon viridinota (Butler, 1871)
- Euphaedra zaddachii Dewitz, 1879
- Euphaedra mondahensis van de Weghe, Oremans & Hecq, 2005
- Euphaedra hewitsoni Hecq, 1974
- Euphaedra diffusa Gaede, 1916
- Euphaedra ansorgei Rothschild, 1918
- Euphaedra imitans Holland, 1893
- Euphaedra vandeweghei Hecq, 2004
- Euphaedra permixtum (Butler, 1873)
- Euphaedra campaspe (Felder & Felder, 1867)
- Euphaedra justicia Staudinger, 1886
- Euphaedra piriformis Hecq, 1982
- Euphaedra uniformis Berger, 1981
- Euphaedra ceres electra Hecq, 1983
- Euphaedra fontainei Hecq, 1977
- Euphaedra rezia (Hewitson, 1866)
- Euphaedra jacksoni Hecq, 1980
- Euphaedra dargeana Hecq, 1980
- Euphaedra subprotea Hecq, 1986
- Euphaedra eleus (Drury, 1782)
- Euphaedra variabilis Guillaumin, 1976
- Euphaedra edwardsii (van der Hoeven, 1845)
- Euphaedra ruspina (Hewitson, 1865)
- Euphaedra harpalyce spatiosa (Mabille, 1876)
- Euphaedra temeraria Hecq, 2007
- Euphaedra opulenta Hecq & Van de Weghe, 2005
- Euphaedra limbourgi Oremans, 2006
- Euphaedra abri Faravel, 2005
- Euphaedra sabinae Faravel, 2002
- Euptera amieti Collins & Libert, 1998
- Euptera choveti Amiet & Collins, 1998
- Euptera elabontas (Hewitson, 1871)
- Euptera falsathyma Schultze, 1916
- Euptera hirundo Staudinger, 1891
- Euptera pluto (Ward, 1873)
- Euptera semirufa Joicey & Talbot, 1921
- Pseudathyma callina (Grose-Smith, 1898)
- Pseudathyma michelae Libert, 2002

=== Heliconiinae ===
==== Acraeini ====
- Acraea admatha Hewitson, 1865
- Acraea endoscota Le Doux, 1928
- Acraea leucographa Ribbe, 1889
- Acraea neobule Doubleday, 1847
- Acraea quirina (Fabricius, 1781)
- Acraea cepheus (Linnaeus, 1758)
- Acraea egina (Cramer, 1775)
- Acraea pseudegina Westwood, 1852
- Acraea consanguinea (Aurivillius, 1893)
- Acraea elongata (Butler, 1874)
- Acraea epiprotea (Butler, 1874)
- Acraea excisa (Butler, 1874)
- Acraea macarista latefasciata (Suffert, 1904)
- Acraea umbra macarioides (Aurivillius, 1893)
- Acraea vestalis stavelia (Suffert, 1904)
- Acraea althoffi bitjana Bethune-Baker, 1926
- Acraea aurivillii Staudinger, 1896
- Acraea encoda Pierre, 1981
- Acraea serena (Fabricius, 1775)
- Acraea jodutta (Fabricius, 1793)
- Acraea orestia Hewitson, 1874
- Acraea pentapolis Ward, 1871

==== Vagrantini ====
- Lachnoptera anticlia (Hübner, 1819)
- Phalanta eurytis (Doubleday, 1847)
- Phalanta phalantha aethiopica (Rothschild & Jordan, 1903)

== Hesperiidae ==
=== Coeliadinae ===
- Coeliades chalybe (Westwood, 1852)
- Coeliades forestan (Stoll, [1782])
- Coeliades hanno (Plötz, 1879)
- Coeliades pisistratus (Fabricius, 1793)
- Pyrrhochalcia iphis (Drury, 1773)

=== Pyrginae ===
==== Celaenorrhinini ====
- Loxolexis dimidia (Holland, 1896)
- Celaenorrhinus boadicea (Hewitson, 1877)
- Celaenorrhinus illustris (Mabille, 1891)
- Celaenorrhinus macrostictus Holland, 1893
- Celaenorrhinus pooanus Aurivillius, 1910
- Celaenorrhinus rutilans (Mabille, 1877)
- Eretis melania Mabille, 1891
- Sarangesa bouvieri (Mabille, 1877)
- Sarangesa brigida sanaga Miller, 1964
- Sarangesa motozioides Holland, 1892
- Sarangesa tertullianus (Fabricius, 1793)
- Sarangesa thecla (Plötz, 1879)
- Sarangesa tricerata (Mabille, 1891)

==== Tagiadini ====
- Tagiades flesus (Fabricius, 1781)
- Eagris decastigma fuscosa (Holland, 1893)
- Eagris hereus (Druce, 1875)
- Eagris subalbida aurivillii (Neustetter, 1927)
- Procampta rara Holland, 1892
- Abantis nigeriana rougeoti Berger, 1959

==== Carcharodini ====
- Spialia ploetzi (Aurivillius, 1891)

=== Hesperiinae ===
==== Aeromachini ====
- Prosopalpus debilis (Plötz, 1879)
- Gorgyra aretina (Hewitson, 1878)
- Gorgyra bina Evans, 1937
- Gorgyra kalinzu Evans, 1949
- Gorgyra minima Holland, 1896
- Gorgyra mocquerysii Holland, 1896
- Gorgyra rubescens Holland, 1896
- Gorgyra sola Evans, 1937
- Gyrogra subnotata (Holland, 1894)
- Teniorhinus ignita (Mabille, 1877)
- Teniorhinus watsoni Holland, 1892
- Teniorhinus niger (Druce, 1910)
- Ceratrichia clara medea Evans, 1937
- Ceratrichia flava Hewitson, 1878
- Ceratrichia phocion camerona Miller, 1971
- Ceratrichia semilutea Mabille, 1891
- Pardaleodes edipus (Stoll, 1781)
- Pardaleodes incerta murcia (Plötz, 1883)
- Pardaleodes sator pusiella Mabille, 1877
- Pardaleodes tibullus (Fabricius, 1793)
- Pardaleodes xanthopeplus Holland, 1892
- Xanthodisca astrape (Holland, 1892)
- Xanthodisca rega (Mabille, 1890)
- Xanthodisca vibius (Hewitson, 1878)
- Acada annulifer (Holland, 1892)
- Rhabdomantis sosia (Mabille, 1891)
- Osmodes adonia Evans, 1937
- Osmodes adonides Miller, 1971
- Osmodes adosus (Mabille, 1890)
- Osmodes costatus Aurivillius, 1896
- Osmodes distincta Holland, 1896
- Osmodes hollandi Evans, 1937
- Osmodes laronia (Hewitson, 1868)
- Osmodes lindseyi Miller, 1964
- Osmodes lux Holland, 1892
- Parosmodes lentiginosa (Holland, 1896)
- Paracleros substrigata (Holland, 1893)
- Osphantes ogowena (Mabille, 1891)
- Acleros ploetzi Mabille, 1890
- Semalea pulvina (Plötz, 1879)
- Semalea sextilis (Plötz, 1886)
- Hypoleucis ophiusa (Hewitson, 1866)
- Meza cybeutes (Holland, 1894)
- Meza indusiata (Mabille, 1891)
- Meza leucophaea (Holland, 1894)
- Meza mabea (Holland, 1894)
- Meza mabillei (Holland, 1893)
- Paronymus budonga (Evans, 1938)
- Paronymus xanthias (Mabille, 1891)
- Paronymus xanthioides (Holland, 1892)
- Andronymus caesar (Fabricius, 1793)
- Andronymus evander (Mabille, 1890)
- Andronymus helles Evans, 1937
- Andronymus hero Evans, 1937
- Andronymus neander (Plötz, 1884)
- Zophopetes ganda Evans, 1937
- Zophopetes nobilior (Holland, 1896)
- Gamia buchholzi (Plötz, 1879)
- Gamia shelleyi (Sharpe, 1890)
- Artitropa comus (Stoll, 1782)
- Mopala orma (Plötz, 1879)
- Gretna balenge (Holland, 1891)
- Gretna cylinda (Hewitson, 1876)
- Gretna lacida (Hewitson, 1876)
- Gretna waga (Plötz, 1886)
- Pteroteinon caenira (Hewitson, 1867)
- Pteroteinon iricolor (Holland, 1890)
- Pteroteinon laterculus (Holland, 1890)
- Pteroteinon laufella (Hewitson, 1868)
- Leona binoevatus (Mabille, 1891)
- Leona lena Evans, 1937
- Leona leonora (Plötz, 1879)
- Caenides soritia (Hewitson, 1876)
- Caenides kangvensis Holland, 1896
- Caenides benga (Holland, 1891)
- Caenides dacela (Hewitson, 1876)
- Caenides dacena (Hewitson, 1876)
- Monza alberti (Holland, 1896)
- Melphina melphis (Holland, 1893)
- Melphina statira (Mabille, 1891)
- Melphina statirides (Holland, 1896)
- Melphina unistriga (Holland, 1893)
- Fresna netopha (Hewitson, 1878)
- Platylesches galesa (Hewitson, 1877)

==== Baorini ====
- Borbo fallax (Gaede, 1916)
- Borbo fanta (Evans, 1937)
- Borbo holtzi (Plötz, 1883)
- Parnara monasi (Trimen & Bowker, 1889)

=== Heteropterinae ===
- Lepella lepeletier (Latreille, 1824)

== See also ==
- Geography of Gabon
- List of ecoregions in Gabon
