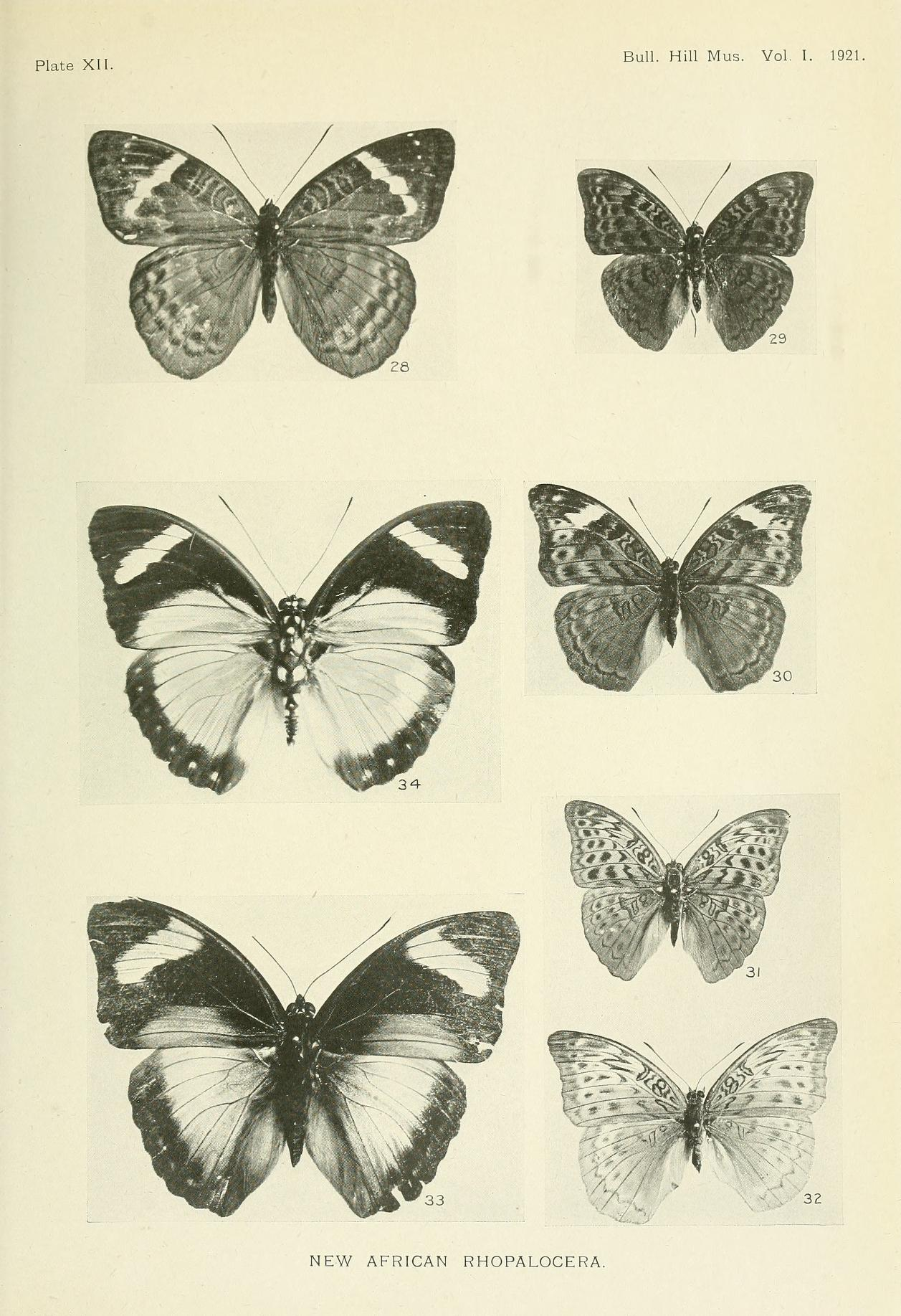
- Plate accompanying the original description, figure 29 (male), figure 30 (female)

Scientific classification
- Kingdom: Animalia
- Phylum: Arthropoda
- Class: Insecta
- Order: Lepidoptera
- Family: Nymphalidae
- Genus: Bebearia
- Species: B. laetitioides

Binomial name
- Bebearia laetitioides (Joicey & Talbot, 1921)

Synonyms
- Euryphene laetitioides Joicey & Talbot, 1921; Bebearia (Bebearia) laetitioides; Bebearia laetitioides periguinea Hecq, 1989

= Bebearia laetitioides =

Species of butterfly

Bebearia laetitioides is a butterfly in the family Nymphalidae. It is found in the eastern part of the Democratic Republic of the Congo and western Uganda. The habitat consists of forests.

Euryphene laetitioides sp. nov. (pl. XII, fig. 29 3, 30 2). Allied to laetitia Ploetz, and not easy to distinguish from it. The underside, however, is greenish and without any of the brown tint of laetitia.Male: Upperside coloration and markings similar to Bebearia laetitia, and fore wing with no constant difference. Hind wing with black discal band not reaching vein 3, generally stopping at vein 2, and indistinctly defined beyond this in Cameroons specimens. Postdiscal band thinner than in the allied species, and spots in 2 and 3 indistinct; second post-discal band similar, the spots in 2 and 3 mostly indistinct. Underside markings similar to laetitia. Basal area more sharply defined, greyish-green; distal area dull-green, all markings distinct. Fore wing with basal area paler and more greyish than in hind wing, without white markings; distal area more greenish and discal brown curved line strongly marked. Hind wing with violaceous suffusion on the basal and inner area and at the apex, submarginal line well marked. Female Upperside similar to the female of Bebearia congolensis Capr., but smaller, more brownish, and black spots indistinct. Ground-colour brownish- grey with a greenish tinge. Fore wing with black apex and white subapical band (in one specimen with a yellow tinge) reaching vein 4 ; between this and the cell black, filling cellule 3 and extending into the distal end of cellule 2. A series of submarginal spots edged with grey-brown. Distal margin black, traversed by an indistinct grey-brown admarginal line. Hind wing marking as in congolensis but discal spots small and indistinct. Underside markings very similar to the male, the coloration more uniform than in congolensis, and distinguished from it by the narrow pale mark in 7 of the hind wing. Ground-colour brownish- grey with markings accentuated by grey-white scaling. Length of fore wing, male 26 mm., female 30 mm. Habitat.—Lesse, Ituri Forest, February, 1920, Itoa River, Ituri Forest, Ruwenzori.
