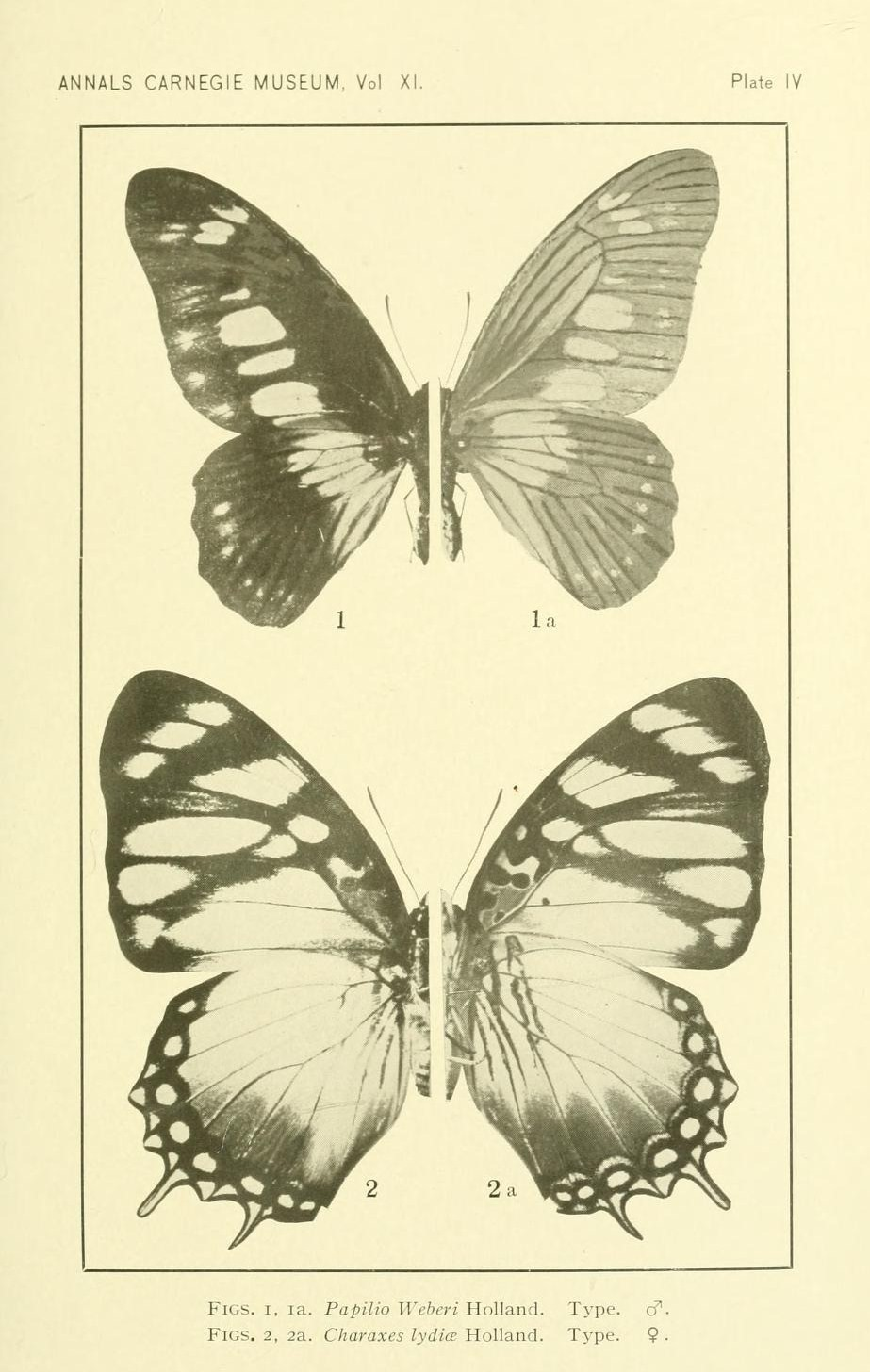

Scientific classification
- Kingdom: Animalia
- Phylum: Arthropoda
- Clade: Pancrustacea
- Class: Insecta
- Order: Lepidoptera
- Family: Nymphalidae
- Genus: Charaxes
- Species: C. lydiae

Binomial name
- Charaxes lydiae Holland, 1917

= Charaxes lydiae =

Species of butterfly

Charaxes lydiae is a butterfly in the family Nymphalidae. It is found in Cameroon, Gabon and the Republic of the Congo.

== Description ==
The antennae are black. The palpi are black above, brilliant white below. The front and head are black, with a minute white spot before and behind the insertion of each antenna. The upper side of the thorax is clothed with whitish gray hairs, the upper side of the abdomen is whitish, with the hind edges of the six posterior segments marked with black. The pectus and lower side of the abdomen are white. The legs are white below, black above. Upper side of wings: The fore wing at the base is densely clothed with glaucous gray scales as far as the middle of the cell, but through this vestiture the dark markings at the base of the cell on the lower side faintly appear. The end of the cell is deep black, but with a small trapezoidal white spot intervening between the black area and the glaucous gray area at the base. A broad white triangular area, extends upward from the inner three-fourths of the margin to the origin of vein 3, but does not reach the outer angle. The remainder of the wing above and beyond this white area is black, ornamented with conspicuous white spots. At the outer angle is a triangular white spot. Above this spot, between the extremities of veins 2 and 3, there is a lanceolate spot, with its apex pointing inwardly. Above this, between veins 3 and 4, there are two spots, the outer one large and long, fusiform, the inner small and subtriangular, with its base at the point of origin of vein 4. Between veins 4 and 5, immediately before the end of the cell, is a small suboval spot, which is rounded inwardly, conforming to the course of the ! i>ver discocellular vein, and outwardly is less clearly defined. Above vein 5 and a little beyond the last mentioned white spot there is a band of white running inwardly and upwardly to the costa, narrowing from vein 5 as it approaches the costal margin. There are three smaller white spots, forming a subapical band, located on the fifth, sixth, and seventh interspaces. The inner half of the hindwing is white, passing into ochre-yellow near the inner margin and on the outer third as far forward as the extremity of vein 5. The hind wing is tailed at the extremity of the first and second median nervules (veins 2 and 4). The outer border is broadly black, each interspace ornamented with a more or less oval white submarginal spot, except at the inner angle, where there are two such spots in the interspace between the extremities of the inner vein and the first median nervule. At the end of veins 2 to 6 on either side are sub- triangular small white spots, which at the end of veins 2 and 4 are continued outwardly upon the tails, which, as also the entire outer border of the wing, are narrowly margined with black. A few blue scales form a faint lunule over the small white spot which is the innermost of the two nearest the anal angle. Under side of the wings: The markings of the upper side are for the most part repeated on the under side, with the following difi^erences: the fore wings at the base are deep ochre-yellow, in the cell there are a number of deep black spots, one immediately at the base, coalescing with another just beyond it projecting inwardly from the costa, opposite the latter spot on the lower margin of the cell is a small round spot, at the middle of the cell are two conspicuous somewhat oval spots tending to coalesce with each other, at the end of the cell is a large irregular spot suggesting the rude outline of a comma, in the head of which is a small quadrangular spot of pale yellow, beyond the cell on vein 2, just beyond its origin, is a small black spot, about a millimeter in diameter, which stands forth conspicuously upon the white ground of this part of the wing. Near the base of the hind wing are six narrow black streaks conforming at their extremities in their course to the neuration of this part of the wing, but crossing the cell; the outer border has the same maculation as the upper side, but the submarginal white spots on the lower side are distinctly ringed about with black, each ring being surmounted inwardly by a narrow pale green lunule, which is again bordered on the side of the base of the wing with a fine black line. Expanse, as spread, 90 mm. The type, which is thus far unique, was taken by the Rev. Albert I. Good at Lolodorf, Cameroon, August 12, 1910, and is in the Carnegie Museum. Holland, W.J. 1917. Two new West African Rhopalocera. Annales of the Carnegie Museum 11: 14-18.

== Biology ==
The habitat consists of primary forests (the Congolian forests).Darge (1973) gives an account of the biology of lydiae

== Taxonomy ==
Charaxes lydiae is the sole member of the Charaxes lydiae species group.
