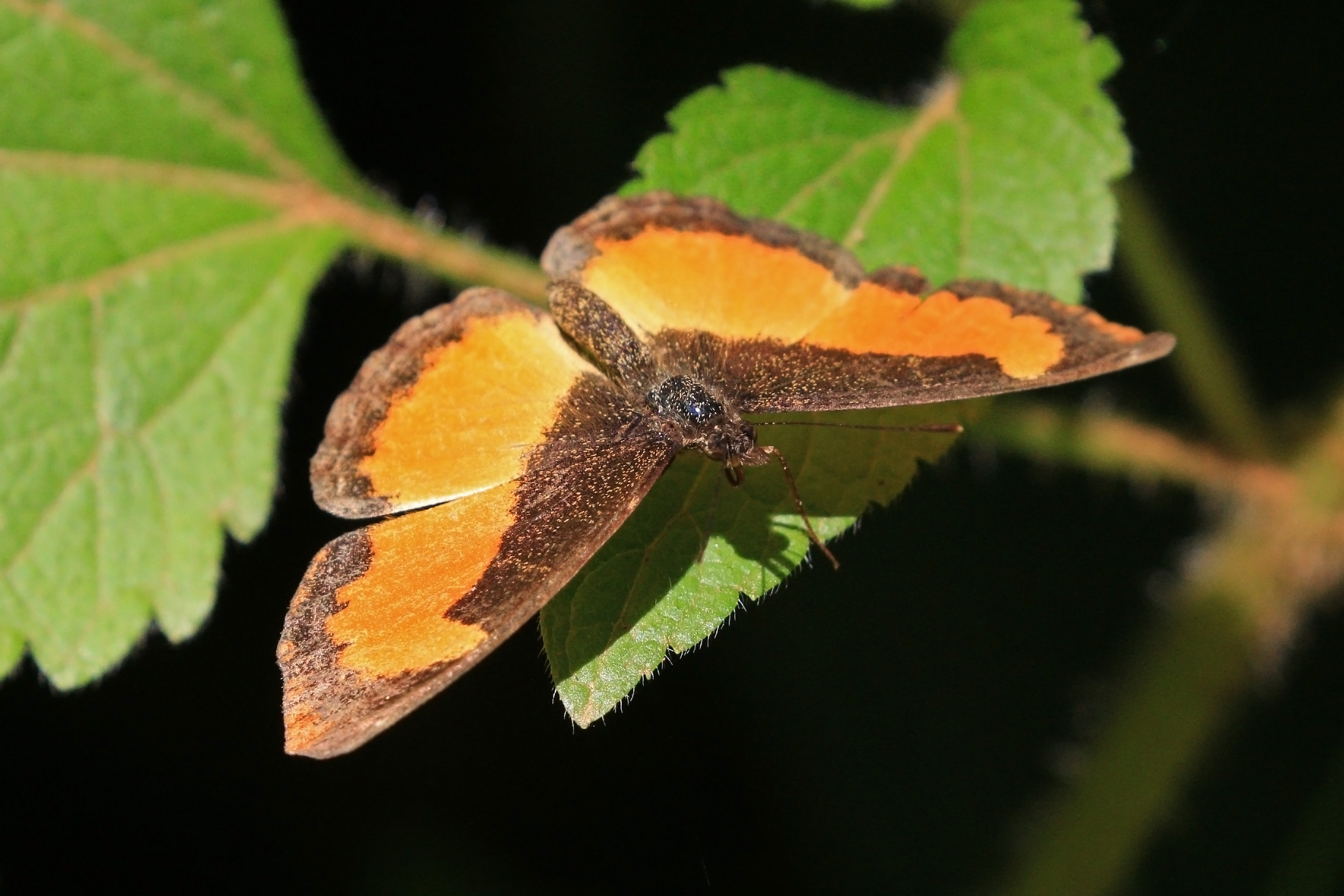

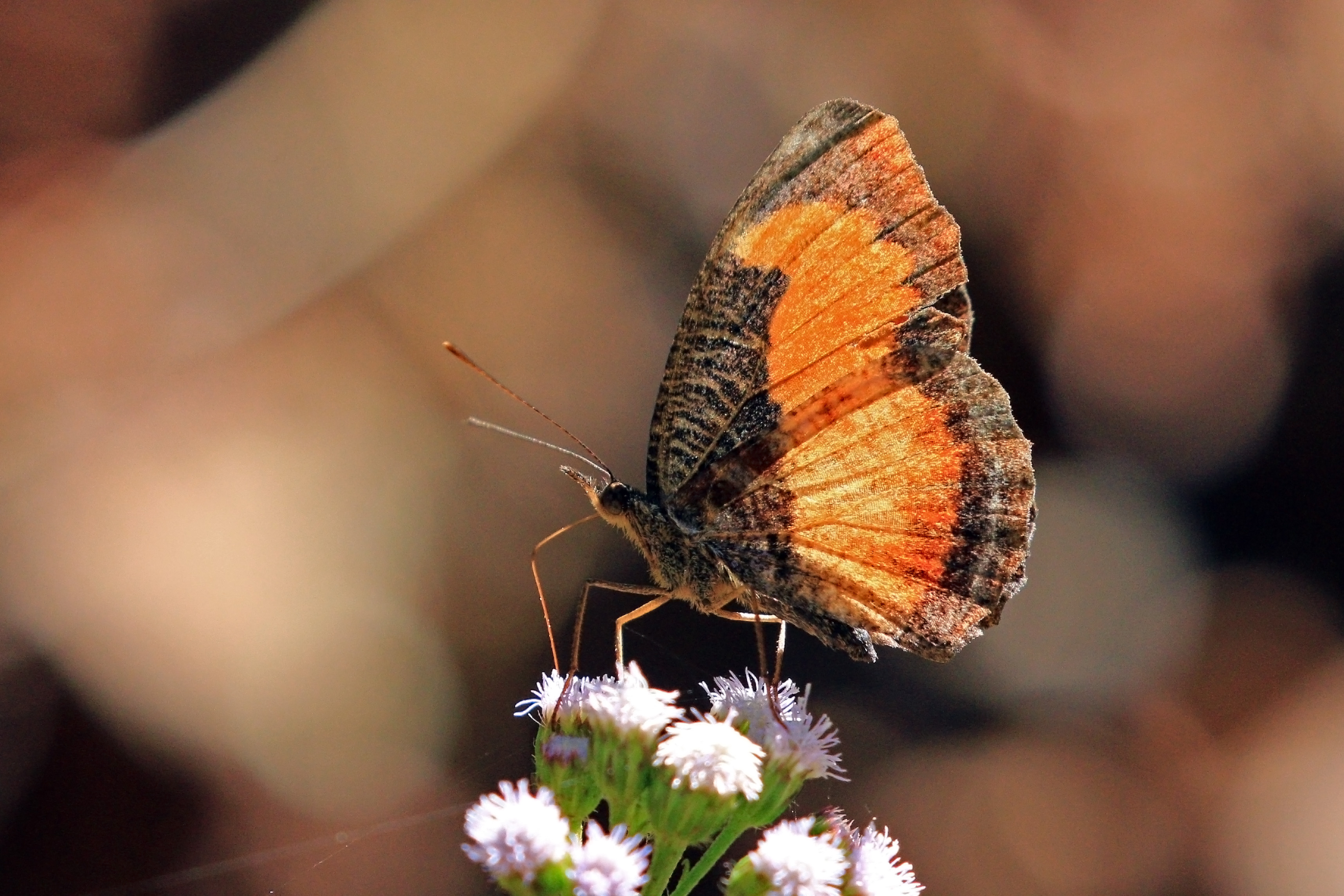
- Both female V. m. latifasciata Kakamega Forest, Kenya

Scientific classification
- Kingdom: Animalia
- Phylum: Arthropoda
- Class: Insecta
- Order: Lepidoptera
- Family: Nymphalidae
- Subfamily: Nymphalinae
- Genus: Vanessula; Dewitz, 1887
- Species: V. milca

Binomial name
- Vanessula milca (Hewitson, 1873)

Synonyms
- Liptena milca Hewitson, 1873; Vanessula buechneri Dewitz, 1887

= Vanessula =

Genus of butterflies

Vanessula is a monotypic butterfly genus in the family Nymphalidae. It contains only one species, Vanessula milca, the black and orange or lady's maid. It is found in Guinea, Sierra Leone, Liberia, Ivory Coast, Ghana, Nigeria, Cameroon, Gabon, the Republic of the Congo, Angola, the Democratic Republic of the Congo, Uganda, Kenya, Tanzania and Zambia. The habitat consists of dense and riverine forests.

== Subspecies ==
- Vanessula milca milca (Guinea, Sierra Leone, Liberia, Ghana)
- Vanessula milca angustifascia Joicey & Talbot, 1928 (Ivory Coast: Nimba Mountains)
- Vanessula milca buechneri Dewitz, 1887 (eastern Nigeria, Cameroon, Gabon, Congo)
- Vanessula milca latifasciata Joicey & Talbot, 1928 (eastern, northern and southern Democratic Republic of the Congo, Uganda, western Kenya, western Tanzania, Zambia)
