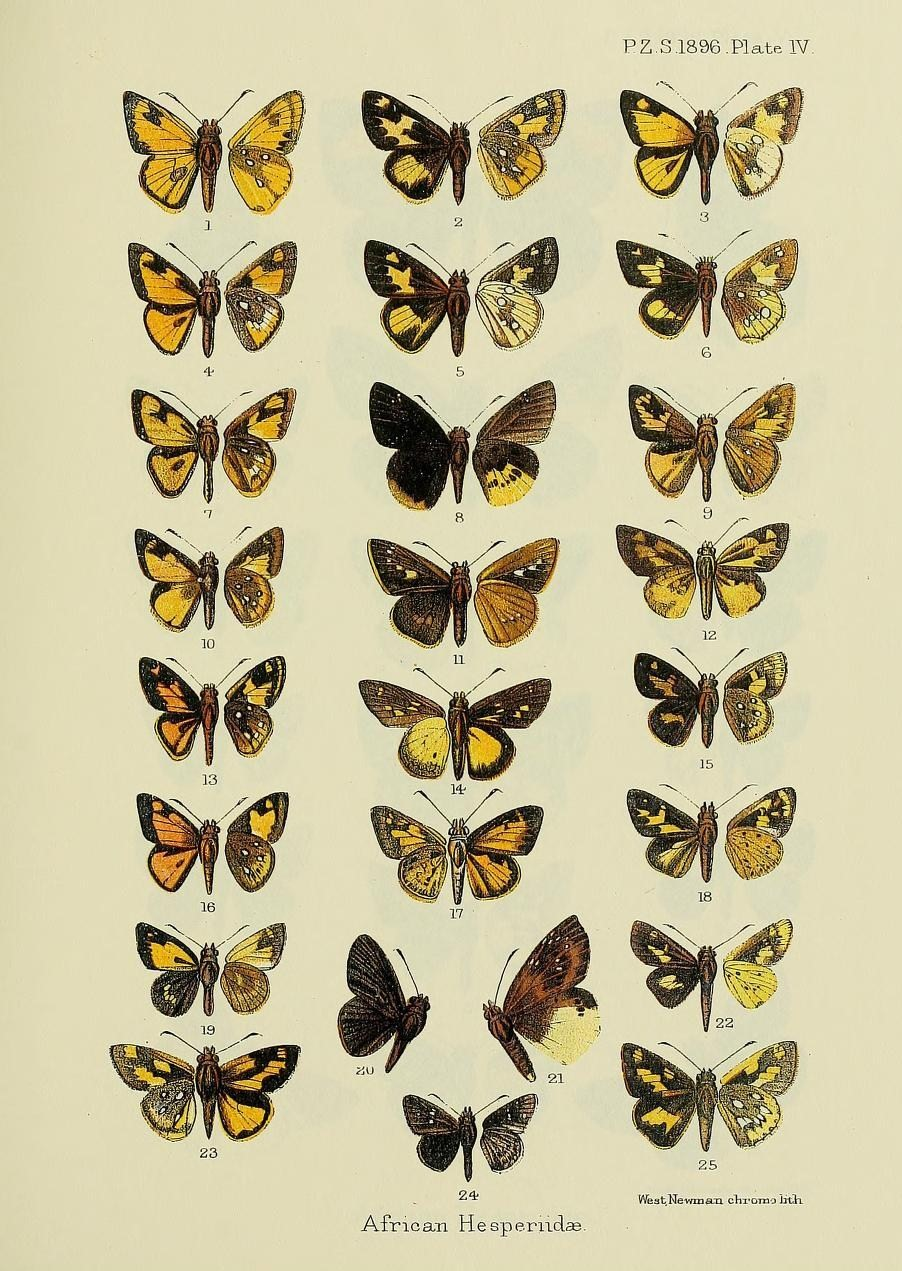
- Figure 14

Scientific classification
- Kingdom: Animalia
- Phylum: Arthropoda
- Class: Insecta
- Order: Lepidoptera
- Family: Hesperiidae
- Genus: Xanthonymus
- Species: X. xanthioides

Binomial name
- Xanthonymus xanthioides (Holland, 1892)

Synonyms
- Pardaleodes xanthioides Holland, 1892; Paronymus xanthioides (Holland, 1892)

= Xanthonymus xanthioides =

Species of butterfly

Xanthonymus xanthioides, the littler largest dart, is a species of butterfly in the family Hesperiidae. It is found in Nigeria (the Cross River loop), Cameroon, Gabon and the Republic of the Congo. The habitat consists of forests.
