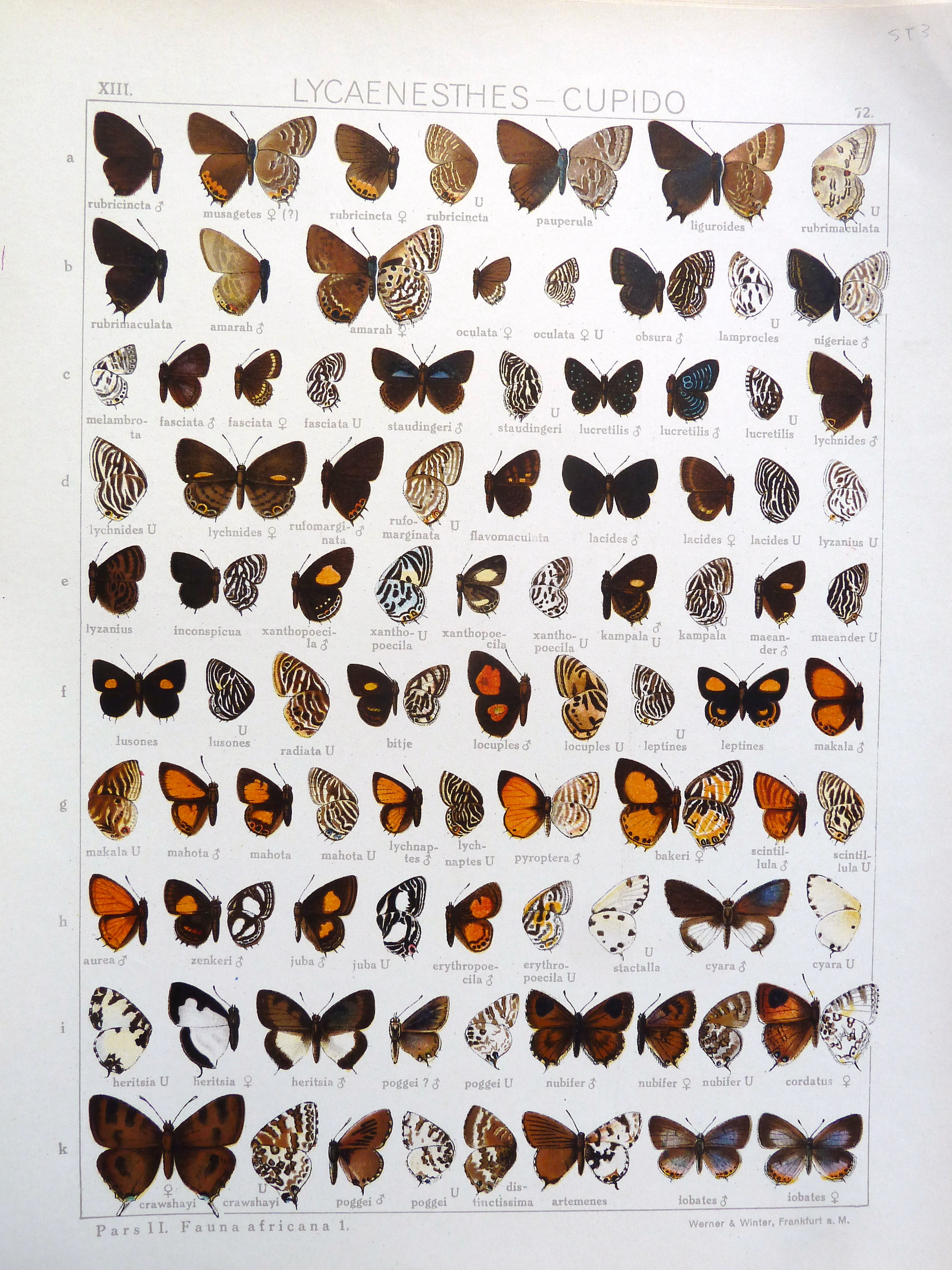
- c

Scientific classification
- Domain: Eukaryota
- Kingdom: Animalia
- Phylum: Arthropoda
- Class: Insecta
- Order: Lepidoptera
- Family: Lycaenidae
- Genus: Anthene
- Species: A. fasciatus

Binomial name
- Anthene fasciatus (Aurivillius, 1895)

Synonyms
- Lycaenesthes (Triclema) fasciatus Aurivillius, 1895; Anthene (Triclema) fasciatus; Lycaenesthes subnitens Bethune-Baker, 1903

= Anthene fasciatus =

Tiny ciliate blue

Species of butterfly

Anthene fasciatus, the tiny ciliate blue, is a butterfly in the family Lycaenidae. It is found in Sierra Leone, Liberia, Ivory Coast, Ghana, Nigeria (south and the Cross River loop), Cameroon, Gabon and the eastern part of the Democratic Republic of the Congo. The habitat consists of forests.
