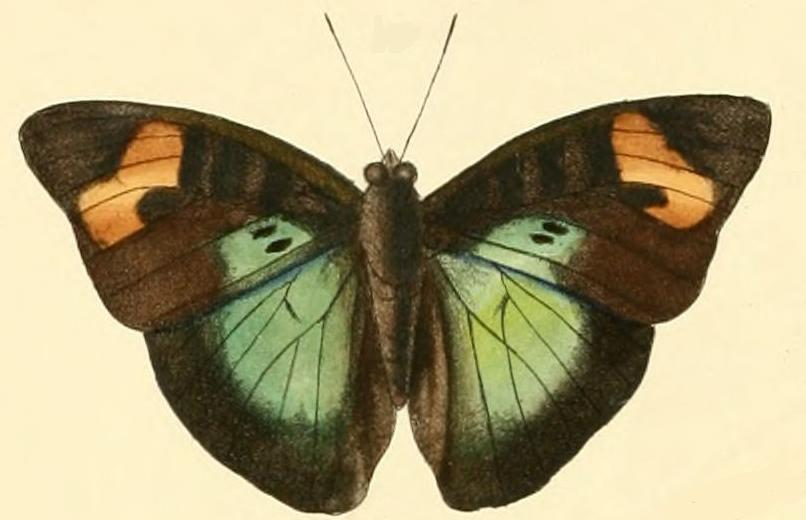

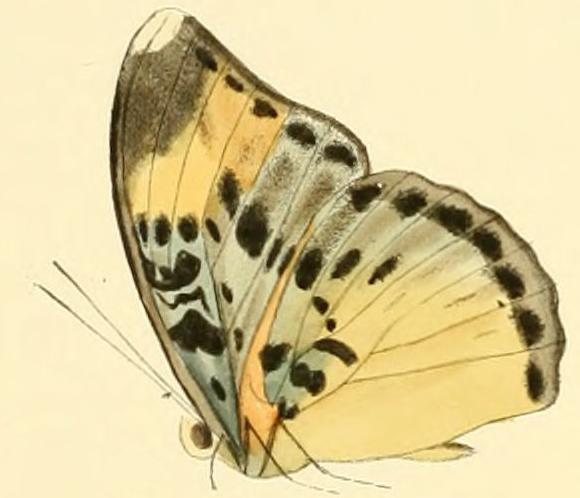

Scientific classification
- Kingdom: Animalia
- Phylum: Arthropoda
- Clade: Pancrustacea
- Class: Insecta
- Order: Lepidoptera
- Family: Nymphalidae
- Genus: Bebearia
- Species: B. cutteri

Binomial name
- Bebearia cutteri (Hewitson, 1865)

Synonyms
- Ramalaeosoma cutteri Hewitson, 1865; Bebearia (Bebearia) cutteri; Euryphene cognata Grünberg, 1910; Euryphene cutteri f. fasciata Aurivillius, 1912; Euphaedra cutteri harleyi Fox, 1968

= Bebearia cutteri =

Cutter's forester

Species of moth

Bebearia cutteri, or Cutter's forester, is a butterfly in the family Nymphalidae. It is found in Sierra Leone, Liberia, Ivory Coast, Ghana, Nigeria, Cameroon, Gabon, the Republic of the Congo, the Central African Republic and the Democratic Republic of the Congo. The habitat consists of wet forests.

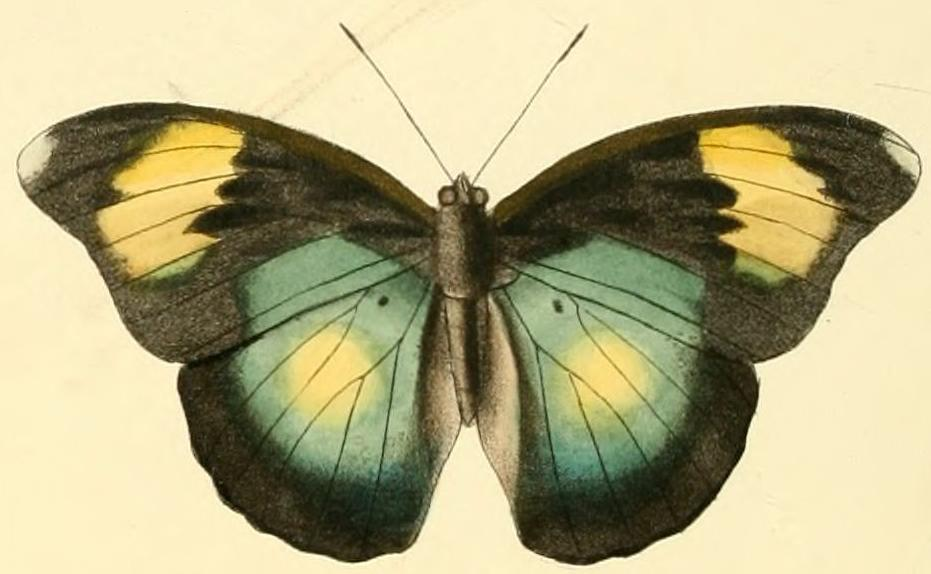

E. cutteri Hew. (40 a female; not male see below). In the male both wings have the ground-colour on the upperside almost uniform blackish; the subapical band of the forewing is about 5 mm. in breadth, yellow, reaches at least to vein 3 and from vein 5 onwards is broken up and almost parallel with the distal margin, in cellule 3 and in cellule 4 it usually encloses a small dark spot; in cellules 1 a and 1 b is placed a green hindmarginal spot, which, however, extends little if at all beyond the middle of the hindmargin and encloses 2 or 3 black spots; the hindwing is bright green from the base to a black marginal band of 6 mm. in breadth, with some small black spots in and at the cell; cellules 1 a and lb are black-grey with dense, long hairs. Beneath both wings are dull grey-green, at the hindmargin of the forewing brownish and at the inner margin of the hindwing broadly suffused with ochre-yellow as far as vein 2 or 3; the cells bear black spots or transverse streaks and cellules 1 b—6 of the forewing black, often triangular basal spots; in each cellule from 5 to 7 of the hindwing are placed two black spots separated by a whitish or light green transverse spot; the outer series may be regarded as discal spots; the discal spots of the forewing are absent or are only indicated in cellules 1b—3; near the distal margin of both wings a distinct row of black, sometimes very thick submarginal streaks; the subapical band of the fore wing is light yellow and only reaches vein 4; the extreme apex of the forewing beneath white. The female is larger with the forewing longer and only differs in having the apex of the forewing white above also, the subapical band of the forewing broader and the under surface lighter with thicker black markings. Liberia to Cameroons.— The female figured on plate 40 differs so considerably from the typical female that it deserves a separate name, fasciata form. nov. (40 a as cutteri male) differs in the male in that the green hindmarginal spot of the forewing almost reaches the distal margin and is connected with the subapical band by a green spot in cellule 2, the black marginal band on the upperside of the hindwing is only 2 mm. in breadth and the discal spots of the under surface are large and sharply defined and form a median band extending from vein 4 of the forewing to vein 2 of the hindwing. Cameroons. E. cutteri seems to be extremely variable.

== Subspecies ==
- Bebearia cutteri cutteri (eastern Ivory Coast, Ghana, Nigeria)
- Bebearia cutteri camiadei Hecq, 2002 (Central African Republic)
- Bebearia cutteri cognata (Grünberg, 1910) (Cameroon, Gabon, Congo)
- Bebearia cutteri cuypersi Hecq, 2002 (Democratic Republic of the Congo)
- Bebearia cutteri harleyi (Fox, 1968) (Sierra Leone, Liberia)

Torben Larsen developed a species numbering system for his 2005 publication Butterflies of West Africa. The nominate subspecies is #1037. The 'Larsen' numbers have since been used with permission in A Sharp Eye on Butterflies of Ghana.
