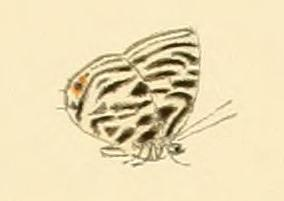

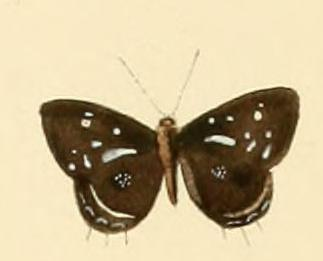

Scientific classification
- Kingdom: Animalia
- Phylum: Arthropoda
- Clade: Pancrustacea
- Class: Insecta
- Order: Lepidoptera
- Family: Lycaenidae
- Genus: Anthene
- Species: A. lamias

Binomial name
- Anthene lamias (Hewitson, 1878)

Synonyms
- Lycaenesthes lamias Hewitson, 1878; Anthene (Triclema) lamias; Triclema lamias katerae d'Abrera, 1980

= Triclema lamias =

Blotched ciliate blue

Species of butterfly

Triclema lamias, formerly Anthene lamias, commonly known as the blotched ciliate blue, is a butterfly belonging to the family Lycaenidae. It is found in Guinea, Sierra Leone, Liberia, Ivory Coast, Ghana, Togo, Nigeria, Cameroon, Gabon, the Republic of the Congo, the Democratic Republic of the Congo, Uganda, Kenya and Tanzania. The habitat consists of primary forests, the forest/Guinea savanna transition zone and secondary forests.

The larvae feed on Lecanium farquharsoni.

== Subspecies ==
- Anthene lamias lamias (Guinea, Sierra Leone, Liberia Ivory Coast, Ghana, Togo, Nigeria: south and Cross River loop, Cameroon, Gabon, Congo, western Democratic Republic of the Congo)
- Anthene lamias katerae (d'Abrera, 1980) (eastern Democratic Republic of the Congo, Uganda, western Kenya, western Tanzania)

Torben Larsen developed a species numbering system for his 2005 publication Butterflies of West Africa. The nominate subspecies, then Anthene lamias is #549. The 'Larsen' numbers have since been used with permission in A Sharp Eye on Butterflies of Ghana.
