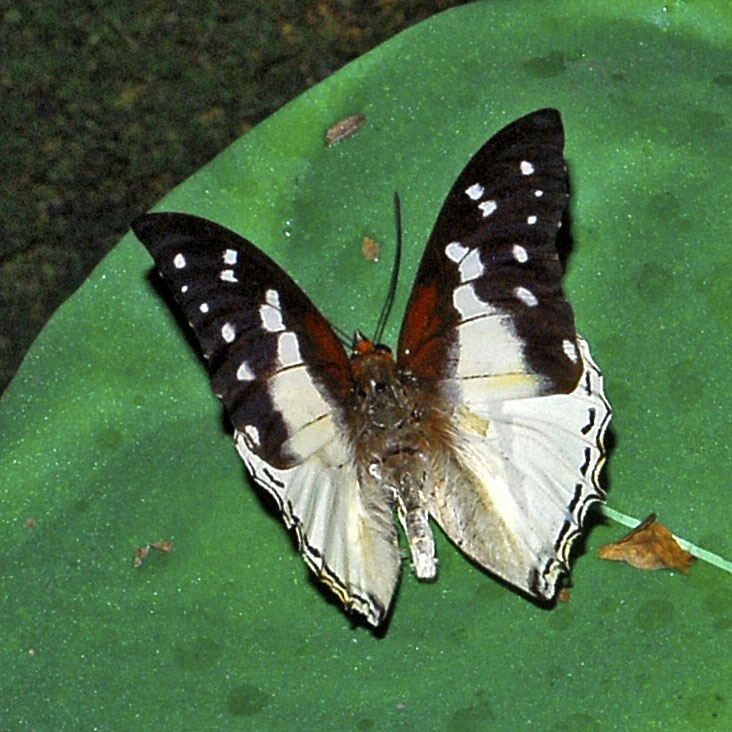
- Charaxes hadrianus, upperside

Scientific classification
- Kingdom: Animalia
- Phylum: Arthropoda
- Clade: Pancrustacea
- Class: Insecta
- Order: Lepidoptera
- Family: Nymphalidae
- Genus: Charaxes
- Species: C. hadrianus

Binomial name
- Charaxes hadrianus Ward, 1871

Synonyms
- Charaxes dux Staudinger, 1886; Charaxes gabonica Crowley, 1890; Charaxes hadrianus orientalis Mollet, 1975; Charaxes hadrianus molleti Koçak, 1996

= Charaxes hadrianus =

Species of butterfly

Charaxes hadrianus, the Hadrian's white charaxes, is a butterfly in the family Nymphalidae.This is a very rare charaxes, especially in West Africa. Individuals come to fruit-baited traps. Schultze states that freshly captured males emit a smell of violets.

== Taxonomy ==
Charaxes hadrianus is the sole member of the Charaxes hadrianus group. The type locality is Cameroun.

== Distribution and habitat ==
This species can be found in Guinea, Sierra Leone, Liberia, Ivory Coast, south-western Ghana, Nigeria, Cameroon, Gabon, the Republic of the Congo, the Central African Republic, the Democratic Republic of the Congo and western Uganda. The habitat consists of wet primary forests.

== Description ==
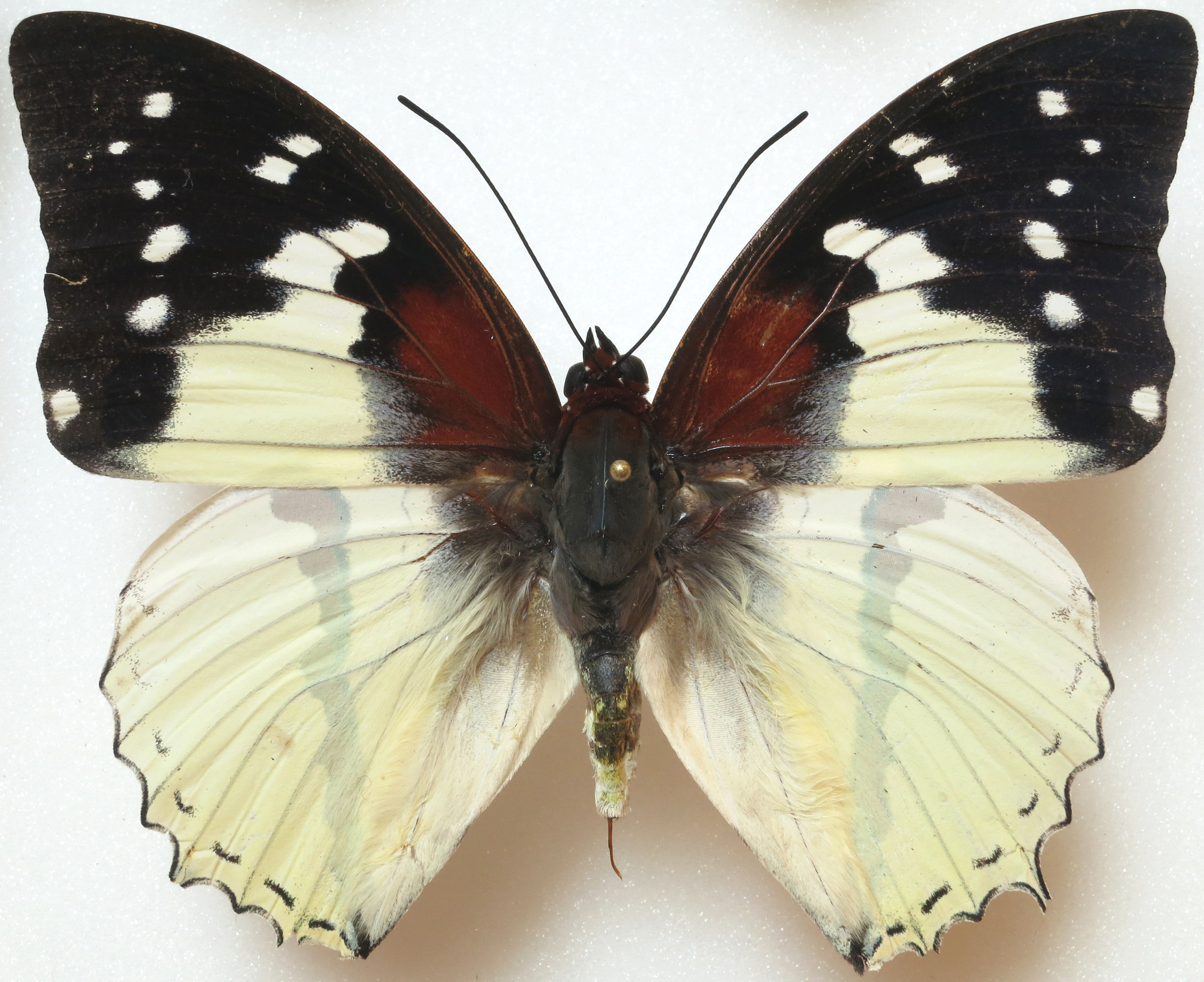
Male from CAR

Charaxes hadrianus has a wingspan reaching about 90 millimetres (3.5 in). The upperside of the forewings is white, with a brown basal area and a black apical part showing several white spots. The underside of the forewings is grey, with a large black eyespot. The upperside of the hindwings is white, with black outer margins. The underside of the hindwings is crossed vertically midway by a red band, with a row of small black spot on the outer margin.

== Description in Seitz ==
Hadrianus Group. This group is only represented by a single species of characteristic appearance. Hindwing above and both wings beneath with white ground-colour. The black transverse streaks in the basal part of the under surface are very fine and in part indistinct or entirely suppressed; in cellule lb of the forewing near the hinder angle a large, deep black spot. The tails of the hindwing are obtuse, the one at vein 2 about 2 mm., that at vein 4 nearly 5 mm. in length. Sexes alike in colour and markings. Ch. hadrianus Ward Forewing at the base red-brown nearly to vein 3, then black with a white median band, at the hindmargin about 15 mm. in breadth, but rapidly narrowing anteriorly and terminating at vein 5, with two small white discal spots in cellules 5 and 6, white submarginal spots in 2-6 and a white marginal spot in lb. Hindwing above narrowly red-brown at the base, with black submarginal and marginal streaks at the distal margin. Beneath the hindwing has in the middle a thick black transverse line, distally accompanied by a deeply dentate red-brown transverse band; this transverse band shows through above. A beautiful but rare species, occurring from the Niger to the Congo.

== Biology ==
The larvae feed on Ouratea species (Ouratea reticulata) and Ochna species.
