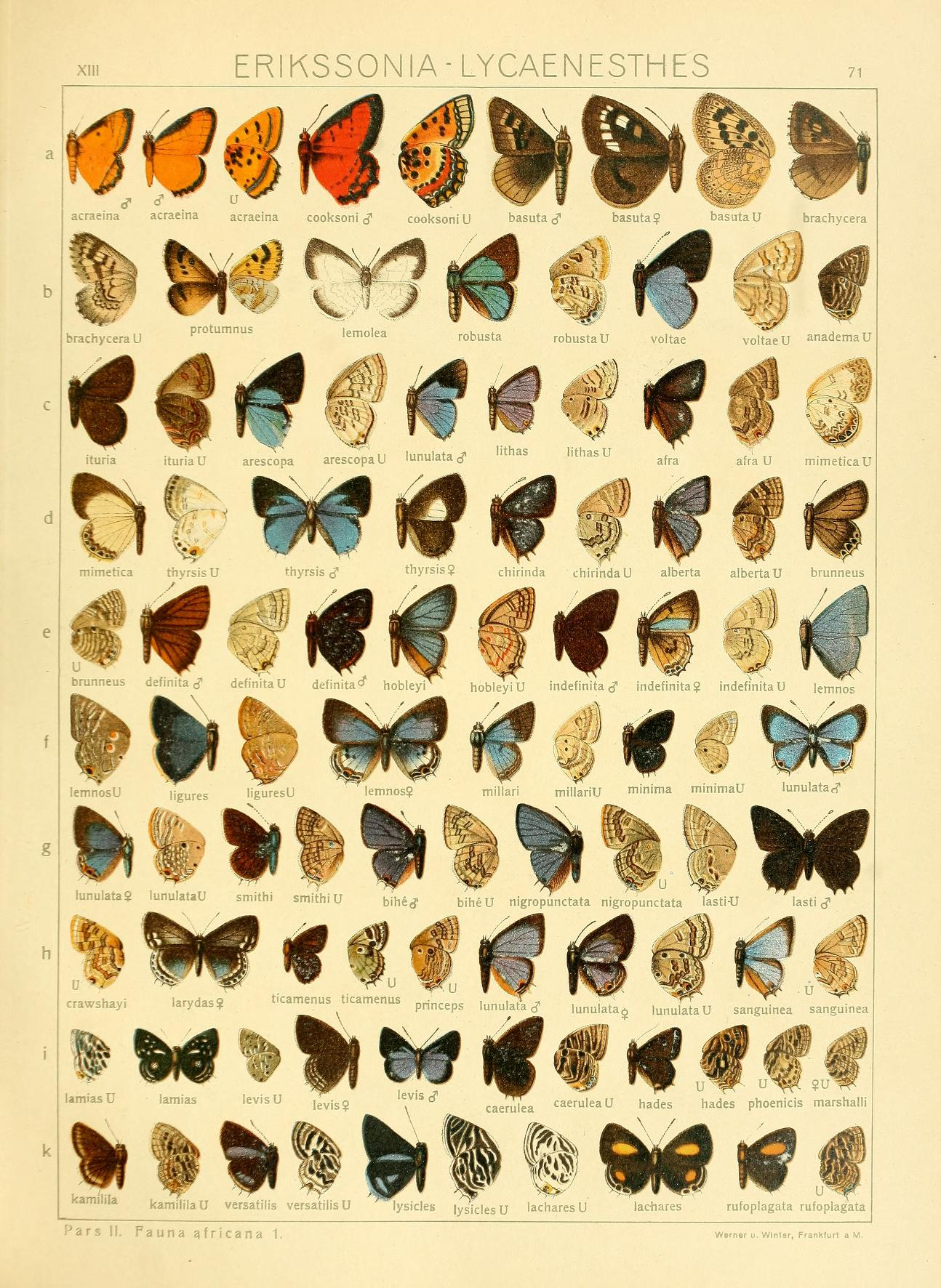

Scientific classification
- Kingdom: Animalia
- Phylum: Arthropoda
- Clade: Pancrustacea
- Class: Insecta
- Order: Lepidoptera
- Family: Lycaenidae
- Genus: Anthene
- Species: A. rubricinctus

Binomial name
- Anthene rubricinctus (Holland, 1891)

Synonyms
- Lycaenesthes rubricinctus Holland, 1891; Anthene (Anthene) rubricinctus; Lycaenesthes musagetes Holland, 1891; Lycaenesthes anadema Druce, 1905; Anthene musagetes elgonensis Stempffer, 1936; Anthene musagetes elgonensis ab. latefasciata Stempffer, 1944

= Anthene rubricinctus =

Indigo ciliate blue

Species of butterfly

Anthene rubricinctus, the indigo ciliate blue, is a butterfly in the family Lycaenidae. It is found in Guinea, Sierra Leone, Liberia, Ivory Coast, Ghana, Togo, Nigeria, Cameroon, the Republic of the Congo, Gabon, Angola, the Democratic Republic of the Congo, Uganda, Kenya, Tanzania, Malawi and Zambia. The habitat consists of forest, especially stream banks.

Adults of both sexes are attracted to flowers and males sometimes mud-puddle.

The larvae feed on the flowers of Pterocarpus esculenta.

== Subspecies ==
- Anthene rubricinctus rubricinctus (Guinea, Sierra Leone, Liberia, Ivory Coast, Ghana, Togo, Nigeria: west, east and the Cross River loop, Cameroon, Congo, Gabon, Democratic Republic of the Congo: Mongala, Uele, Ituri, Kivu, Tshuapa, Equateur and Sankuru)
- Anthene rubricinctus anadema (Druce, 1905) (Angola, Democratic Republic of the Congo: south to Shaba, Tanzania, Malawi, northern Zambia)
- Anthene rubricinctus derubescens (Libert, 2010)
- Anthene rubricinctus jeanneli Stempffer, 1961 (eastern Democratic Republic of the Congo, Uganda, western Kenya, northern Tanzania)

Torben Larsen developed a species numbering system for his 2005 publication Butterflies of West Africa. This species, listed as both nominate and an unidentified subspecies, is #507. The 'Larsen' numbers have since been used with permission in A Sharp Eye on Butterflies of Ghana.
