= Eresiomera cornucopiae =

Scientific classification
- Kingdom: Animalia
- Phylum: Arthropoda
- Class: Insecta
- Order: Lepidoptera
- Family: Lycaenidae
- Genus: Eresiomera
- Species: E. cornucopiae

Binomial name
- Eresiomera cornucopiae (Holland, 1892)

Synonyms
- Durbania cornucopiae Holland, 1892; Pseuderesia cornucopiae

Species of butterfly

Eresiomera cornucopiae is a butterfly in the family Lycaenidae. It is found in Gabon.
