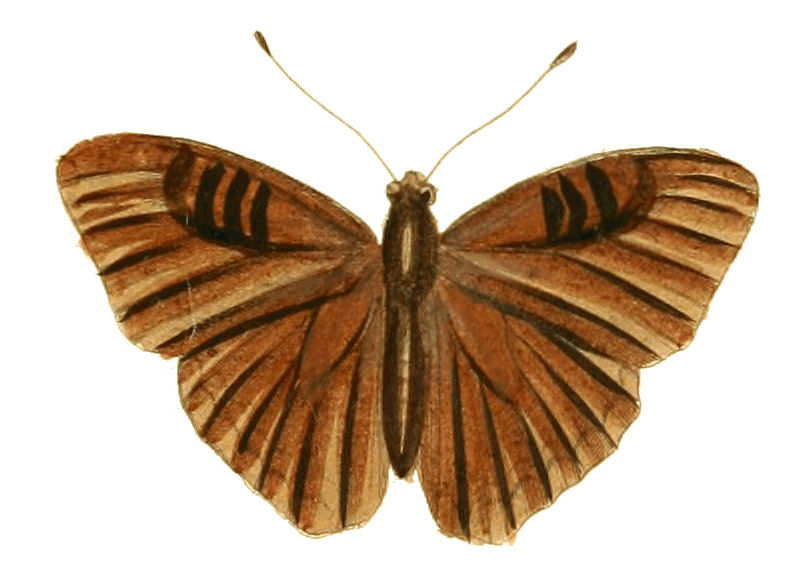
- Illustration by Dru Drury

Scientific classification
- Kingdom: Animalia
- Phylum: Arthropoda
- Clade: Pancrustacea
- Class: Insecta
- Order: Lepidoptera
- Family: Nymphalidae
- Genus: Euriphene
- Species: E. doriclea

Binomial name
- Euriphene doriclea (Drury, 1782)

Synonyms
- Papilio doriclea Drury, 1782; Euriphene (Doricleana) doriclea; Euriphene infusca Capronnier, 1889; Diestogyna mollicella Karsch, 1894

= Euriphene doriclea =

Species of butterfly

Euriphene doriclea, the Doriclea nymph, is a butterfly in the family Nymphalidae. It is found in Sierra Leone, Liberia, Ivory Coast, Ghana, Nigeria, Cameroon, Gabon, the Central African Republic, the Democratic Republic of the Congo and Uganda. The habitat consists of forests.

== Description ==
Upperside: Antennae brown. Thorax and abdomen dark brown. Wings dark clay coloured. The anterior ones having three black marks placed at the middle of the anterior edges, being about a quarter of an inch (6 mm) long, and a few very faint dark marks at the external edges. Posterior wings with only two rows of small faint dark crescents placed along the external edges.

Underside: Palpi, legs, breast, abdomen, and anterior wings light clay coloured; the latter having two black streaks placed close to the anterior edges, near the middle, and a shade of dark brown along the external edges. Posterior wings along the upper part light clay; but towards the abdominal corners are darker. A dark-coloured narrow band rises at the middle of the anterior edges, which runs circularly towards the abdominal groove, but is lost in the general colour of the wing before it reaches that part. About the middle of this inner compartment is a small round black spot, being the only one either on the upperside or underside. Margins of the wings entire, the posterior being slightly angulated. Wingspan 2 1/4 inches (57 mm).

== Subspecies ==
- Euriphene doriclea doriclea (Sierra Leone, Liberia, Ivory Coast, Ghana, Nigeria, Cameroon)
- Euriphene doriclea ducarmei Hecq, 1994 (Democratic Republic of the Congo: Shaba)
- Euriphene doriclea infusca Capronnier, 1889 (northern Cameroon, Gabon, Central African Republic, Uganda: west to Toro and the Bwamba Valley, Democratic Republic of the Congo: Ubangi, Mongala, Uele, north Kivu, Equateur, Kinshasa, Sankuru, Lualaba, Maniema)

Torben Larsen developed a species numbering system for his 2005 publication Butterflies of West Africa. The nominate subspecies is #990. The 'Larsen' numbers have since been used with permission in A Sharp Eye on Butterflies of Ghana.
