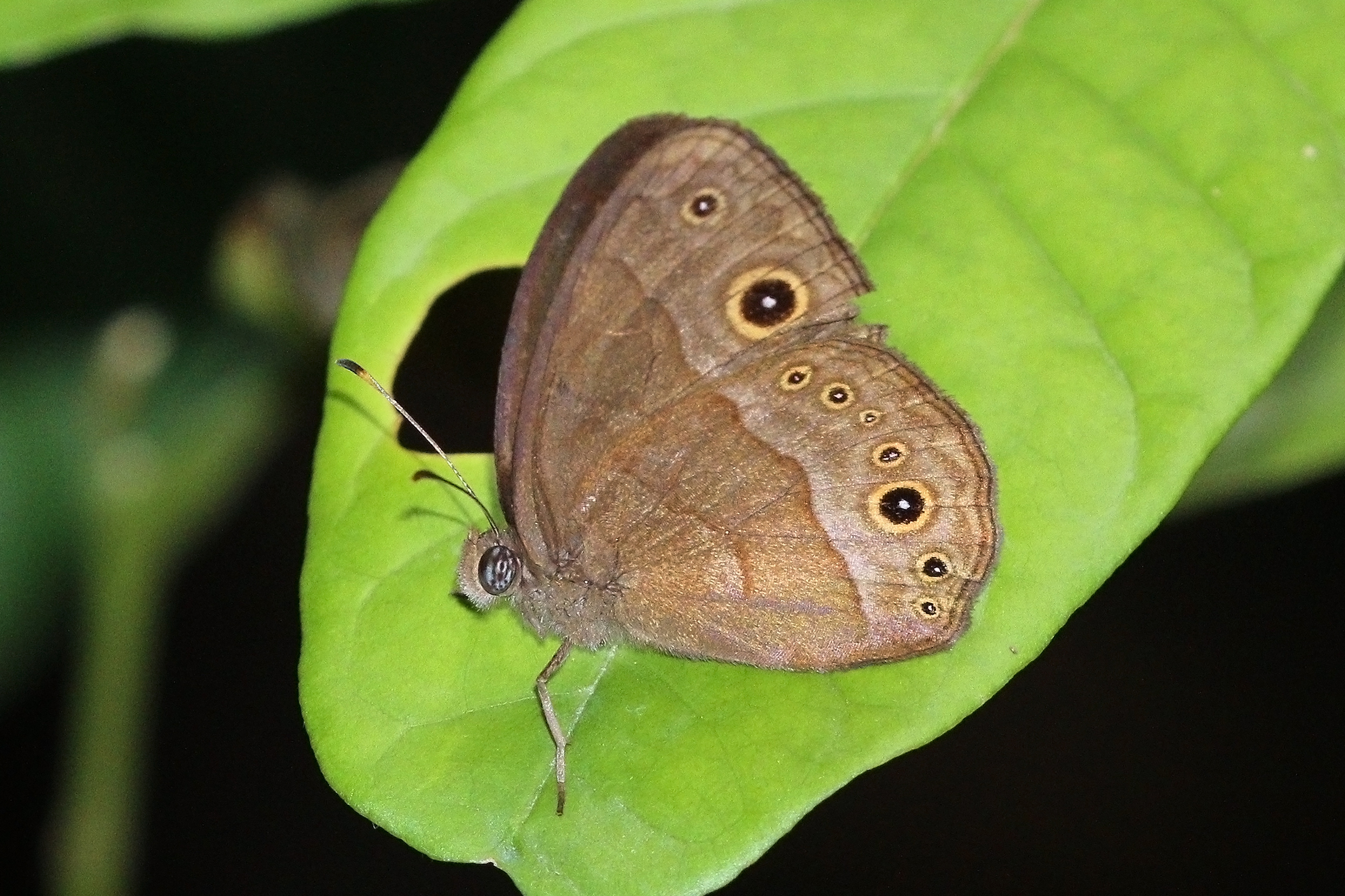
- B. m. madetes Ghana

Scientific classification
- Kingdom: Animalia
- Phylum: Arthropoda
- Clade: Pancrustacea
- Class: Insecta
- Order: Lepidoptera
- Family: Nymphalidae
- Genus: Bicyclus
- Species: B. madetes

Binomial name
- Bicyclus madetes (Hewitson, 1874)

Synonyms
- Mycalesis madetes Hewitson, 1874; Mycalesis nuwa Plötz, 1880; Mycalesis erysichton Ehrmann, 1894

= Bicyclus madetes =

Brown-spot bush brown

Species of butterfly

Bicyclus madetes, the brown-spot bush brown, is a butterfly in the family Nymphalidae. It is found in Guinea, Sierra Leone, Liberia, Ivory Coast, Ghana, Togo, Nigeria, Cameroon, Gabon and the Democratic Republic of the Congo. The habitat consists of forests, including severely degraded forests.

The larvae feed on Poaceae species.

== Subspecies ==
- Bicyclus madetes madetes (Guinea, Sierra Leone, Liberia, Ivory Coast, Ghana, Togo, southern Nigeria, western Cameroon, Gabon)
- Bicyclus madetes carola d'Abrera, 1980 (Cameroon: west of the mountains, Democratic Republic of the Congo: the Kasai)

Torben Larsen developed a species numbering system for his 2005 publication Butterflies of West Africa. The nominate subspecies is #707. The 'Larsen' numbers have since been used with permission in A Sharp Eye on Butterflies of Ghana.

== Variations in spot patterns ==
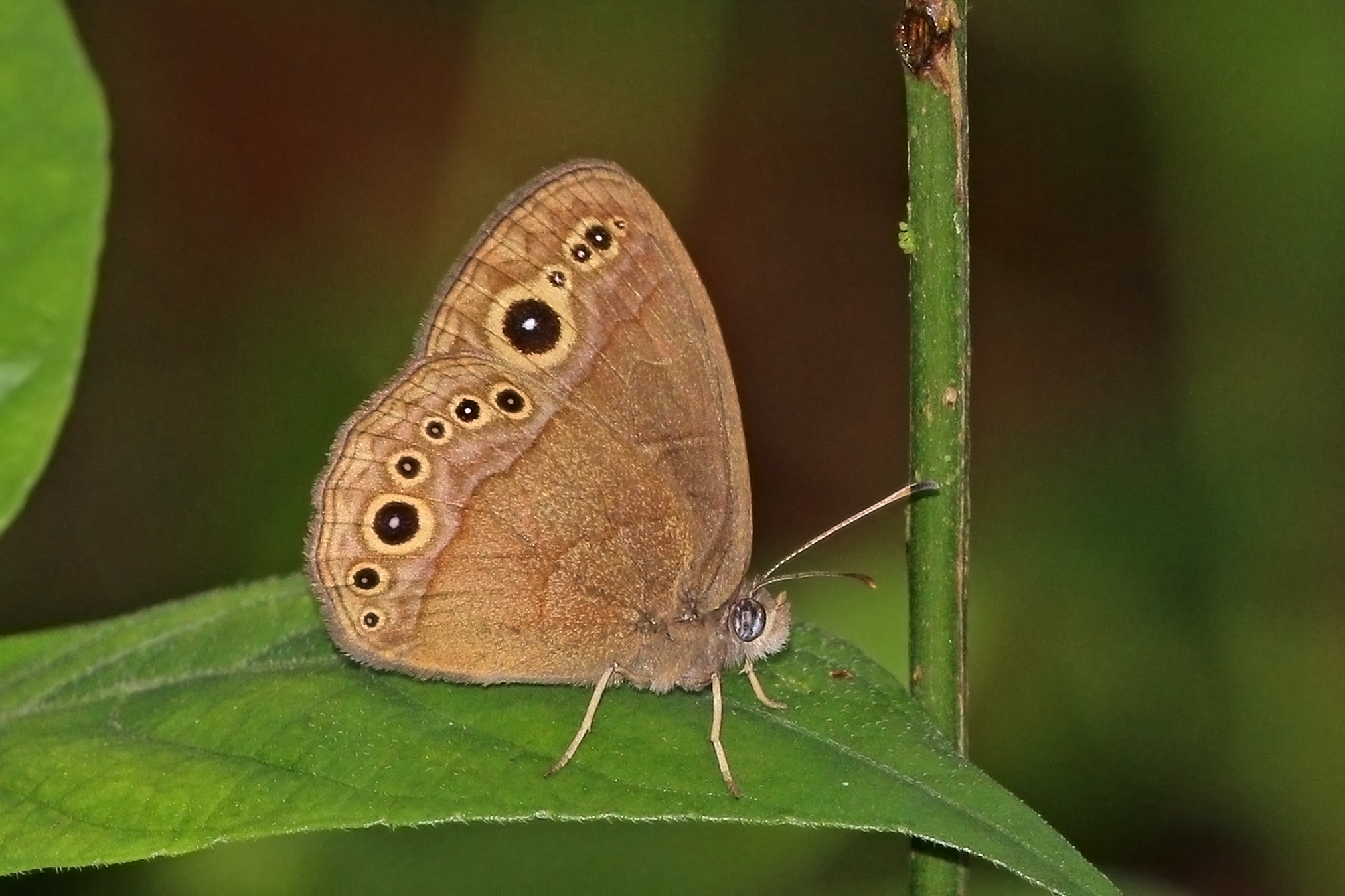

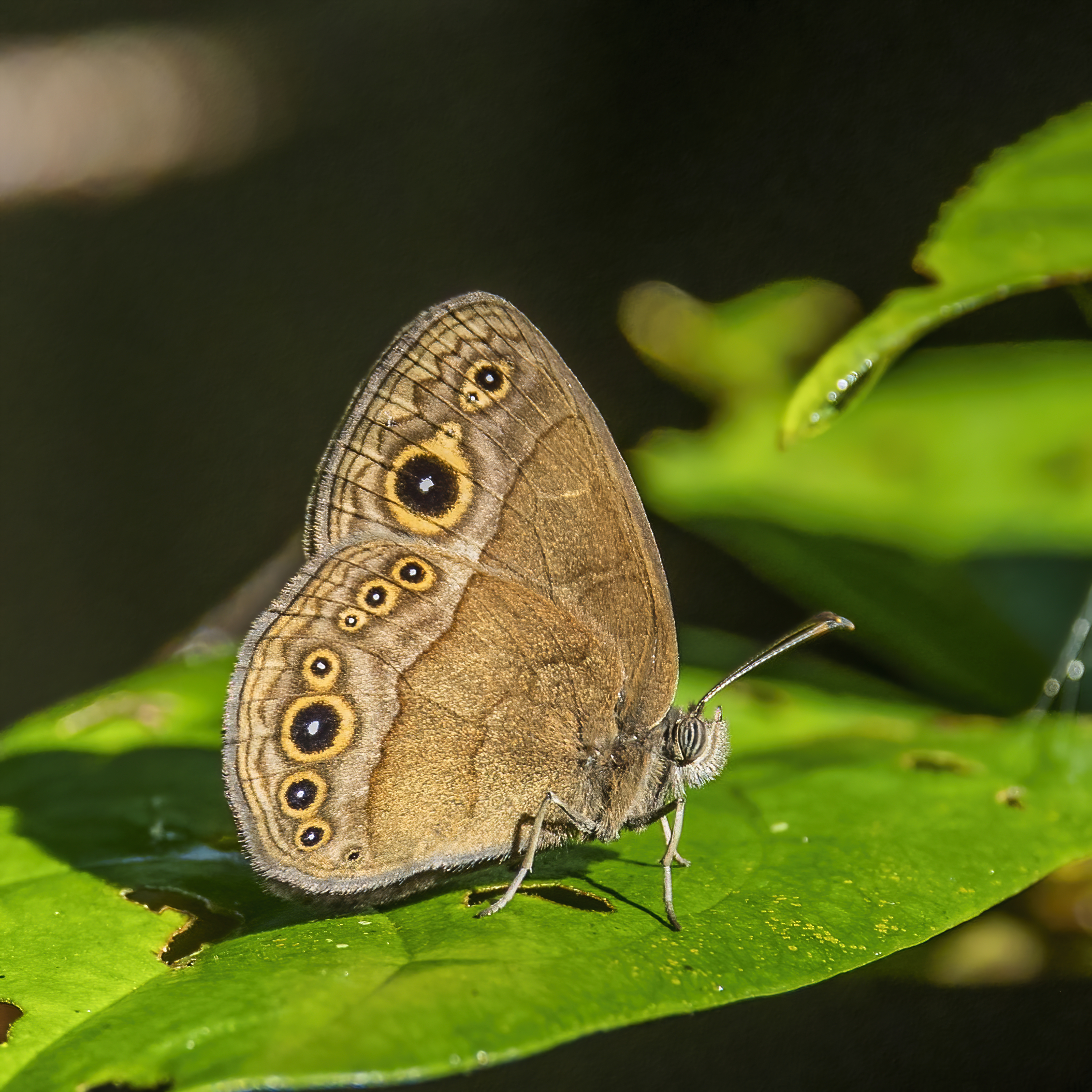
male

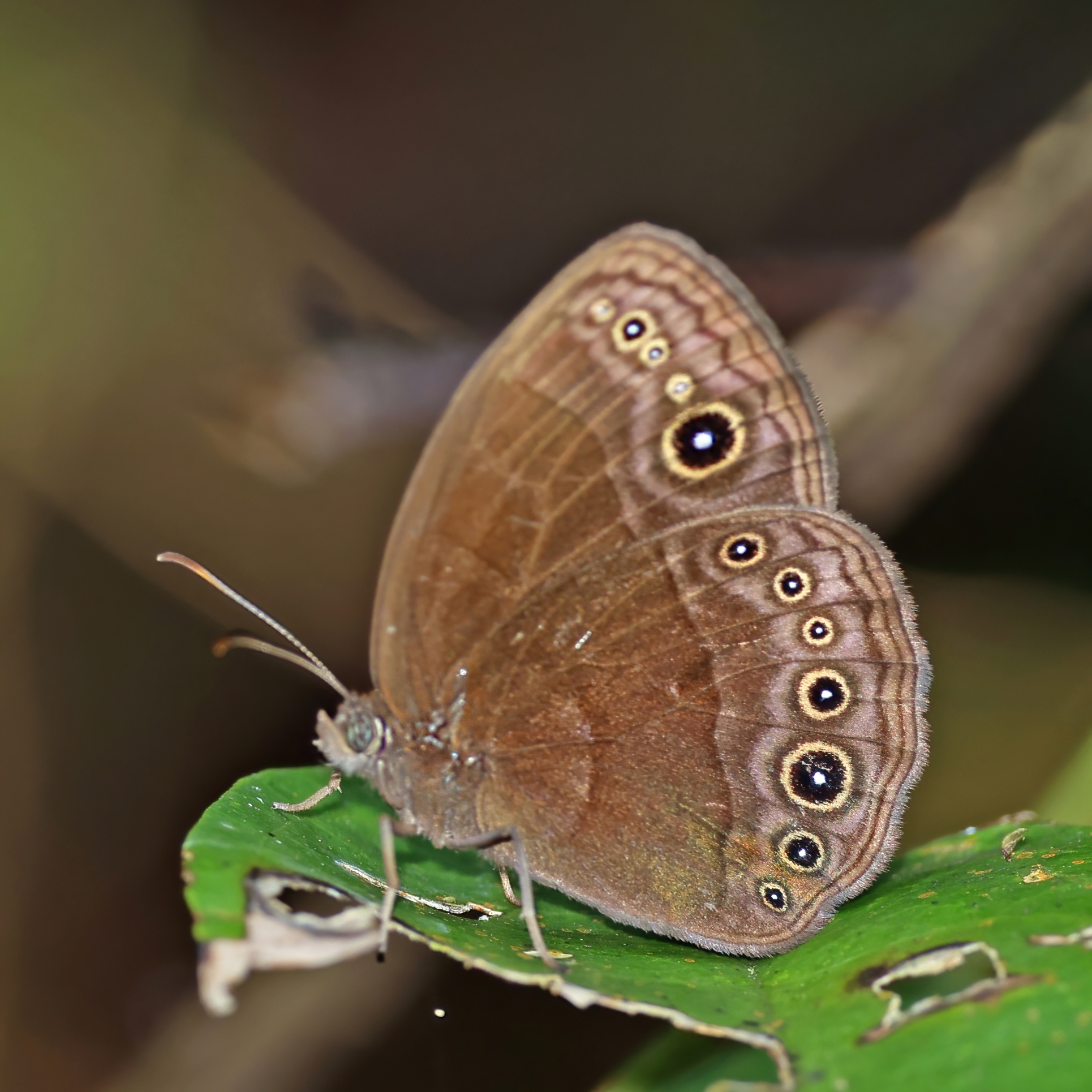
