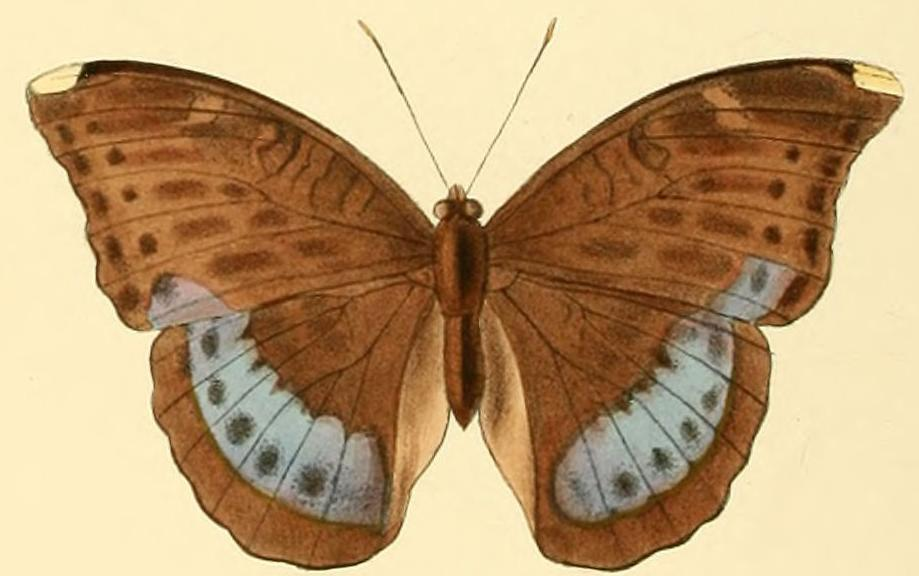

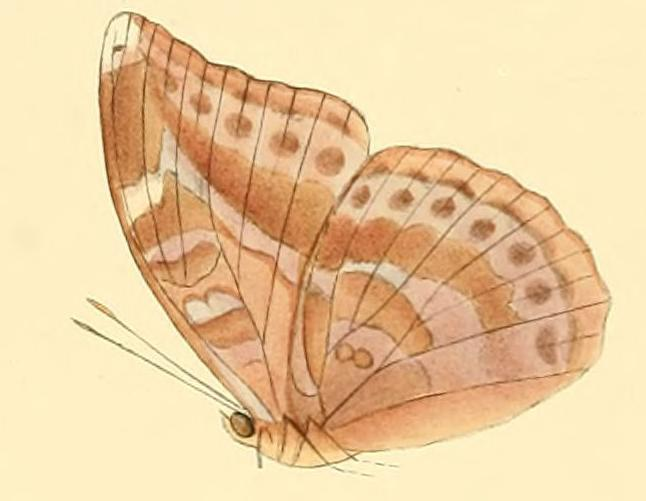

Scientific classification
- Kingdom: Animalia
- Phylum: Arthropoda
- Clade: Pancrustacea
- Class: Insecta
- Order: Lepidoptera
- Family: Nymphalidae
- Genus: Bebearia
- Species: B. demetra

Binomial name
- Bebearia demetra (Godart, 1824)

Synonyms
- Nymphalis demetra Godart, 1824; Bebearia (Bebearia) demetra; Euryphene soemis Hewitson, 1864; Euryphene leonina Staudinger, 1891; Euryphene demetra obsolescens Talbot, 1928

= Bebearia demetra =

Grey forester

Species of butterfly

Bebearia demetra, the grey forester, is a butterfly in the family Nymphalidae. It is found in Guinea, Sierra Leone, Liberia, Ivory Coast, Ghana, Togo, Nigeria, Cameroon, Gabon and the Central African Republic. The habitat consists of wet forests.

E. demetra Godt. (41 b). The male differs from all other species in the black-grey, somewhat glossy ground colour of the upper surface; the black transverse bands are continuous and distinct; the narrow costal area of the fore wing is tinged with bluish; the subapical band is entirely absent; the under surface is bright green, somewhat darker in the distal part, the extreme apex of the forewing, a transverse streak in cellule 7 of the hindwing and 2 or 3 indistinct spots at the costal margin of the forewing are white or whitish; the proximally curved distal area of the forewing on the contrary is not or only indistinctly bordered with white. In the female the wings are uniform dark brown above without distinct transverse bands; the forewing has the apex white and bears a narrow, hardly distinct yellow subapical band; the hindwing beyond the middle with a curved, anteriorly narrowed, blue transverse band; the under surface is strongly glossy, light slate-grey, scarcely tinged with greenish, the apex of the forewing and the narrow subapical band are white, the latter is continued posteriorly in a light oblique line as far as vein 7 of the hindwing. Sierra Leone to Cameroons.

== Subspecies ==
- Bebearia demetra demetra (Guinea, Sierra Leone, Liberia, Ivory Coast, Ghana, Togo, western Nigeria)
- Bebearia demetra obsolescens (Talbot, 1928) (Cameroon, Gabon, Central African Republic)

Torben Larsen developed a species numbering system for his 2005 publication Butterflies of West Africa. The nominate subspecies is #1029. The 'Larsen' numbers have since been used with permission in A Sharp Eye on Butterflies of Ghana.
