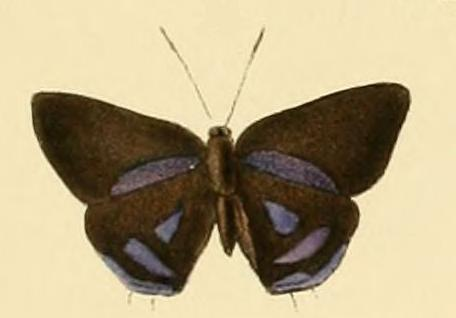

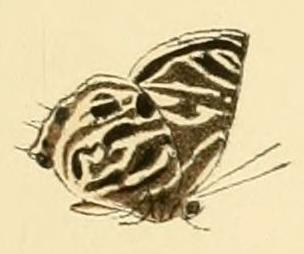

Scientific classification
- Kingdom: Animalia
- Phylum: Arthropoda
- Clade: Pancrustacea
- Class: Insecta
- Order: Lepidoptera
- Family: Lycaenidae
- Genus: Neurellipes
- Species: N. lysicles

Binomial name
- Neurellipes lysicles (Hewitson, 1874)

Synonyms
- Lycaenesthes lysicles Hewitson, 1874; Anthene (Anthene) lysicles

= Neurellipes lysicles =

Violet-spotted ciliate blue

Species of butterfly

Neurellipes lysicles, formerly Anthene lysicles, the violet-spotted ciliate blue, is a butterfly in the family Lycaenidae. It is found in Sierra Leone, Liberia, Ivory Coast, Ghana, Togo, Nigeria (south and the Cross River loop), Cameroon, Gabon, the Republic of the Congo, the Central African Republic and the Democratic Republic of the Congo (Shaba).The habitat consists of forests.

Torben Larsen developed a species numbering system for his 2005 publication Butterflies of West Africa. The nominate subspecies, described as Anthene lysicles, is #527. The 'Larsen' numbers have since been used with permission in A Sharp Eye on Butterflies of Ghana.
