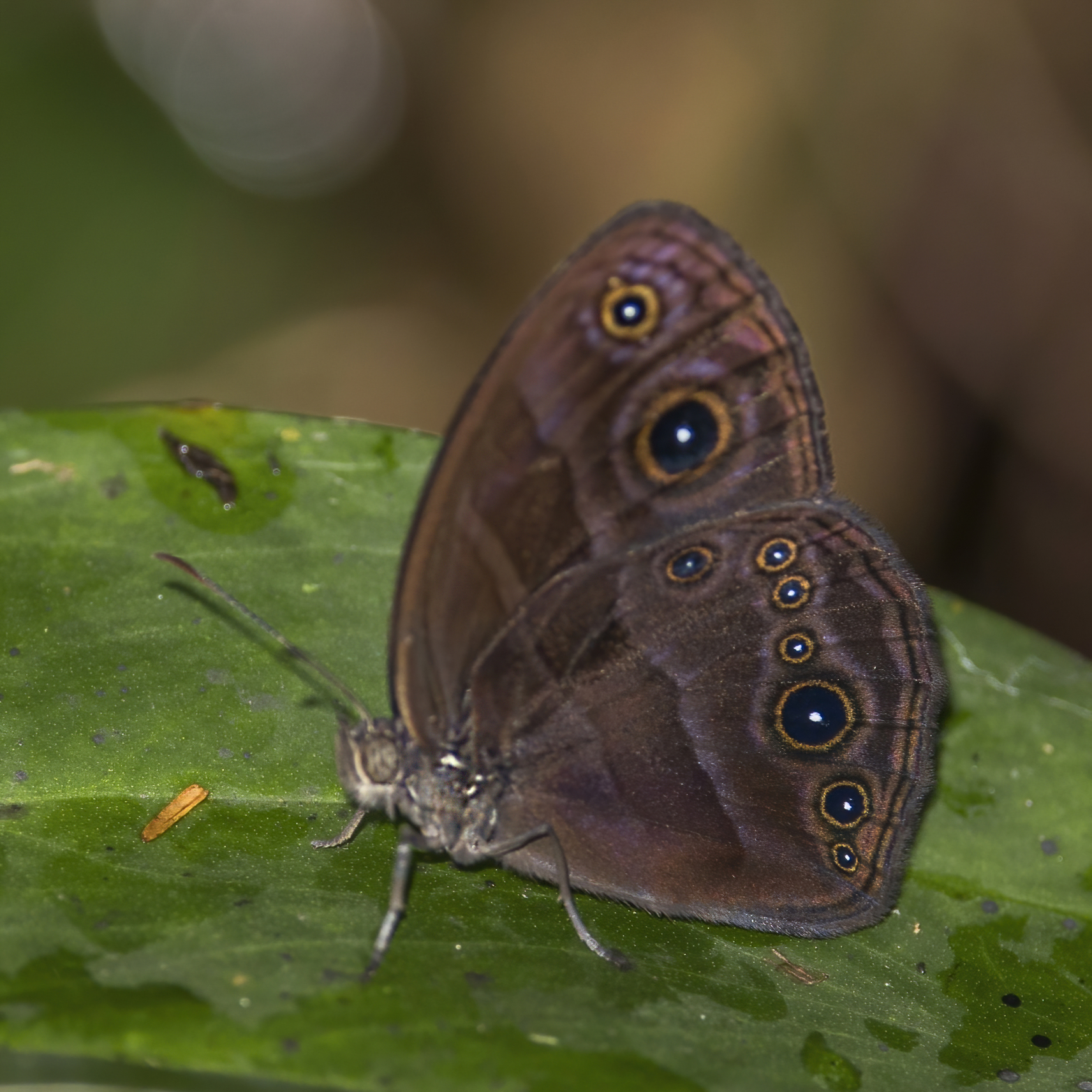
- Male
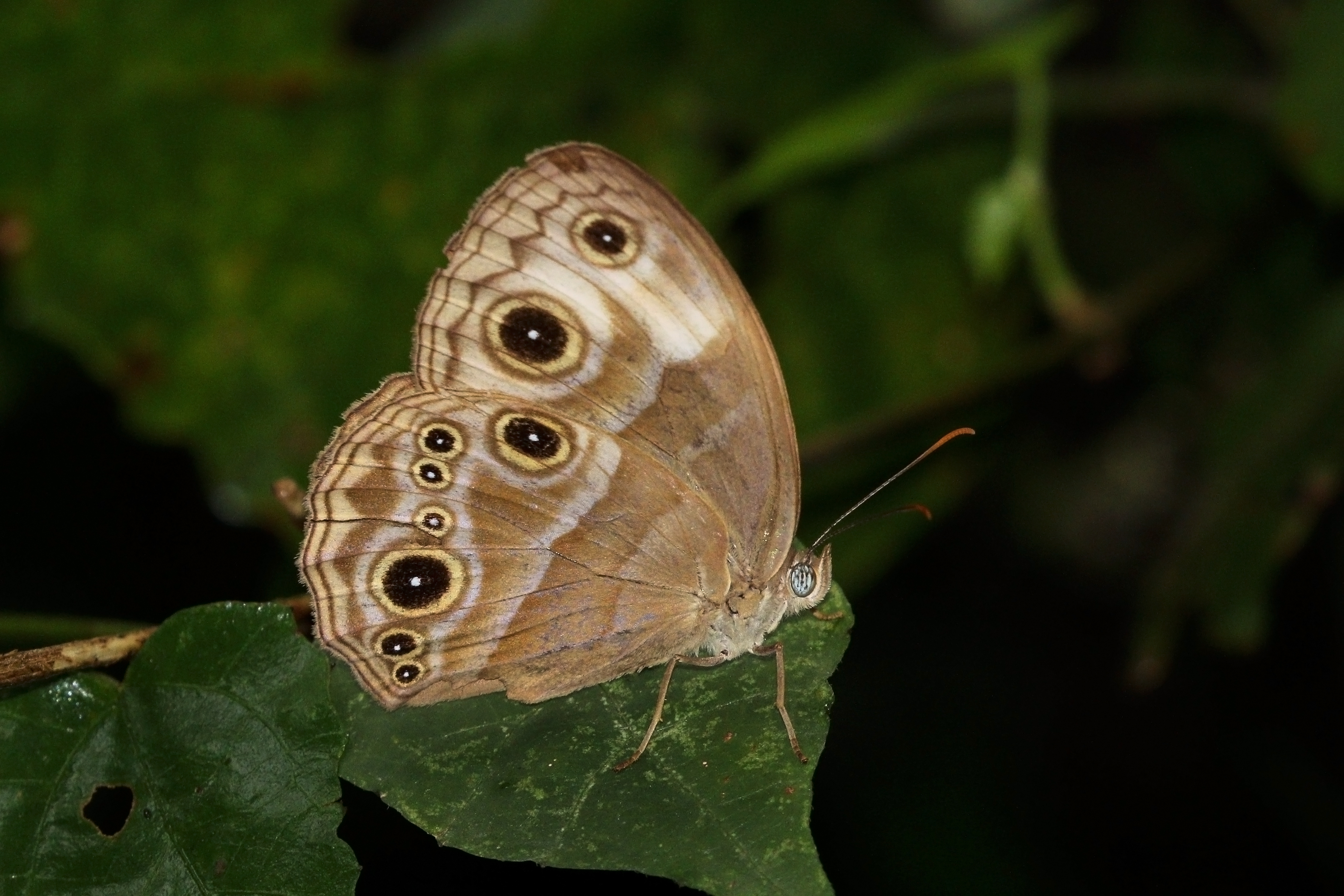
- Female both B. e. elionas, Ghana

Scientific classification
- Kingdom: Animalia
- Phylum: Arthropoda
- Clade: Pancrustacea
- Class: Insecta
- Order: Lepidoptera
- Family: Nymphalidae
- Genus: Bicyclus
- Species: B. evadne

Binomial name
- Bicyclus evadne (Cramer, 1779)

Synonyms
- Papilio evadne Cramer, 1779; Satyrus servatius Godart, 1824; Mycalesis elionias Hewitson, 1866; Mycalesis noblemairei Janet, 1894; Mycalesis subignobilis Strand, 1913; Mycalesis alberici Dufrane, 1945

= Bicyclus evadne =

Species of butterfly

Bicyclus evadne, the small stately bush brown, is a butterfly in the family Nymphalidae. It is found in Guinea, Sierra Leone, Liberia, Ivory Coast, Ghana, Nigeria, Cameroon, Gabon, the Republic of the Congo and the Democratic Republic of the Congo. The habitat consists of forests.

== Subspecies ==
- Bicyclus evadne evadne (Guinea, Sierra Leone, Liberia, western Ivory Coast)
- Bicyclus evadne elionias (Hewitson, 1866) (eastern Ivory Coast, Ghana, eastern Nigeria, Cameroon, Gabon, Congo, Democratic Republic of the Congo)

Torben Larsen developed a species numbering system for his 2005 publication Butterflies of West Africa. The subspecies elionias is #665. The 'Larsen' numbers have since been used with permission in A Sharp Eye on Butterflies of Ghana.
