= Anthene rufoplagata =

Orange-patch ciliate blue

Scientific classification
- Domain: Eukaryota
- Kingdom: Animalia
- Phylum: Arthropoda
- Class: Insecta
- Order: Lepidoptera
- Family: Lycaenidae
- Genus: Anthene
- Species: A. rufoplagata

Binomial name
- Anthene rufoplagata (Bethune-Baker, 1910)

Synonyms
- Triclema rufoplagata Bethune-Baker, 1910; Anthene (Triclema) rufoplagata

Species of butterfly

Anthene rufoplagata, the orange-patch ciliate blue, is a butterfly in the family Lycaenidae. It is found in Sierra Leone, Liberia, Ivory Coast, Ghana, Togo, Nigeria (east and the Cross River loop), Cameroon, Gabon, the Republic of the Congo, the Central African Republic, the Democratic Republic of the Congo (Kinshasa) and Uganda. The habitat consists of primary forests.

Adult males mud-puddle.
