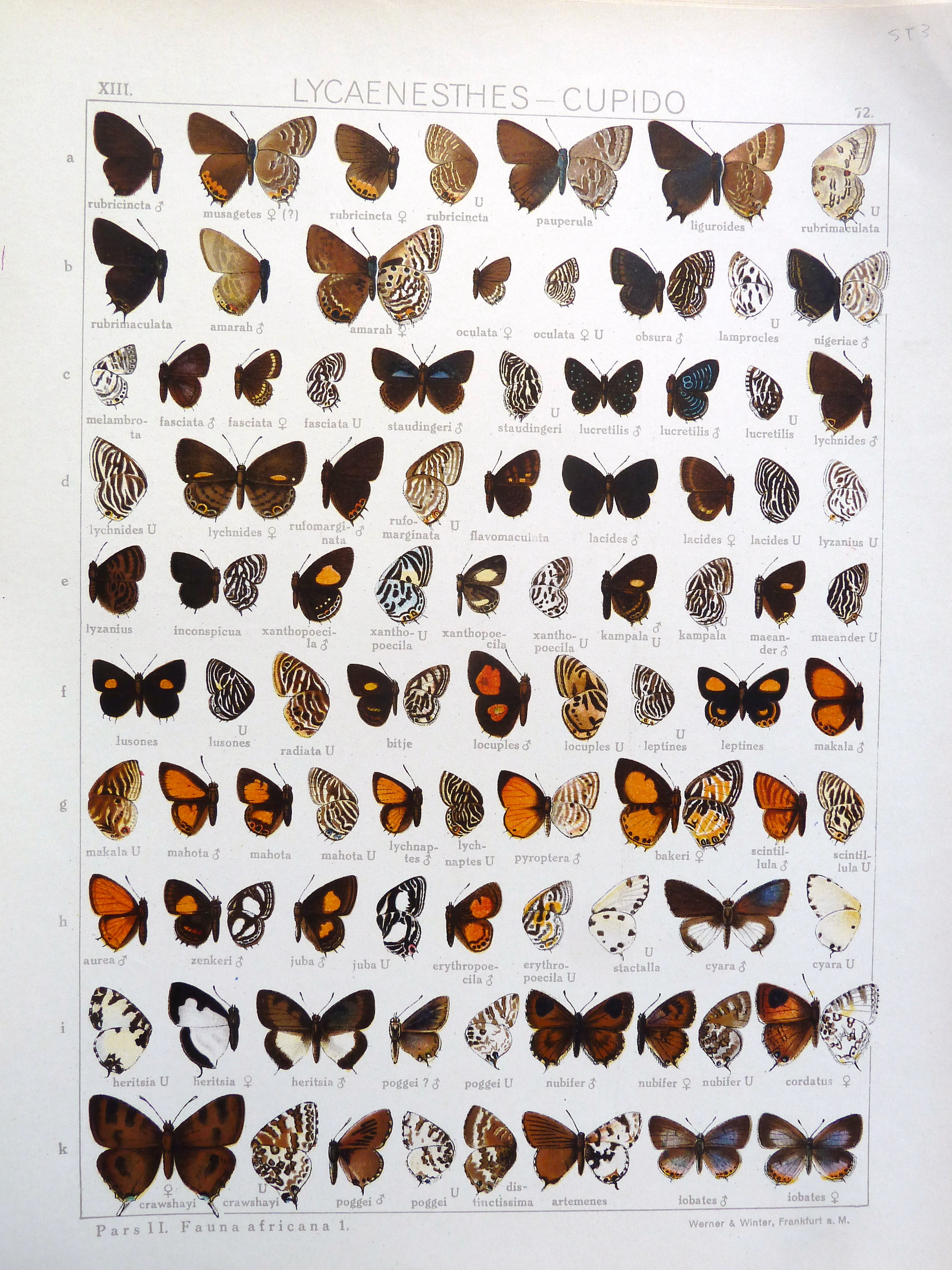
- c

Scientific classification
- Domain: Eukaryota
- Kingdom: Animalia
- Phylum: Arthropoda
- Class: Insecta
- Order: Lepidoptera
- Family: Lycaenidae
- Genus: Anthene
- Species: A. staudingeri

Binomial name
- Anthene staudingeri (Grose-Smith & Kirby, 1894)

Synonyms
- Lycaenesthes staudingeri Grose-Smith & Kirby, 1894; Anthene (Neurellipes) staudingeri; Neurellipes staudingeri obsoleta Stempffer, 1947

= Anthene staudingeri =

Staudinger's ciliate blue

Species of butterfly

Anthene staudingeri, Staudinger's ciliate blue, is a butterfly in the family Lycaenidae. It is found in Sierra Leone, Ghana, Nigeria (south and the Cross River loop), Cameroon, Gabon, the Democratic Republic of the Congo, Uganda, western Kenya and western Tanzania. The habitat consists of primary forests.

== Subspecies ==
- Anthene staudingeri staudingeri (Sierra Leone, Ghana, Nigeria, Cameroon, Gabon, Democratic Republic of the Congo, Uganda, Tanzania)
- Anthene staudingeri obsoleta (Stempffer, 1947) (Kenya)
