= Procampta =

Scientific classification
- Kingdom: Animalia
- Phylum: Arthropoda
- Clade: Pancrustacea
- Class: Insecta
- Order: Lepidoptera
- Family: Hesperiidae
- Subfamily: Tagiadinae
- Genus: Procampta; Holland, 1892
- Species: P. rara

Binomial name
- Procampta rara Holland, 1892

Genus of butterflies

Procampta is a genus of butterflies in the family Hesperiidae. It consists of only one species, Procampta rara, the rare elf, which is found in Sierra Leone, Liberia, Ivory Coast, Ghana, Togo, Nigeria, Cameroon, Gabon, the Republic of the Congo, the Central African Republic, the Democratic Republic of the Congo, and Uganda. The habitat consists of drier forests.

Adults mud-puddle, and males are attracted to bird droppings and have been observed drinking the juices of overripe oranges.

Torben Larsen developed a species numbering system for his 2005 publication Butterflies of West Africa. This species is #1241. The 'Larsen' numbers have since been used with permission in A Sharp Eye on Butterflies of Ghana.
