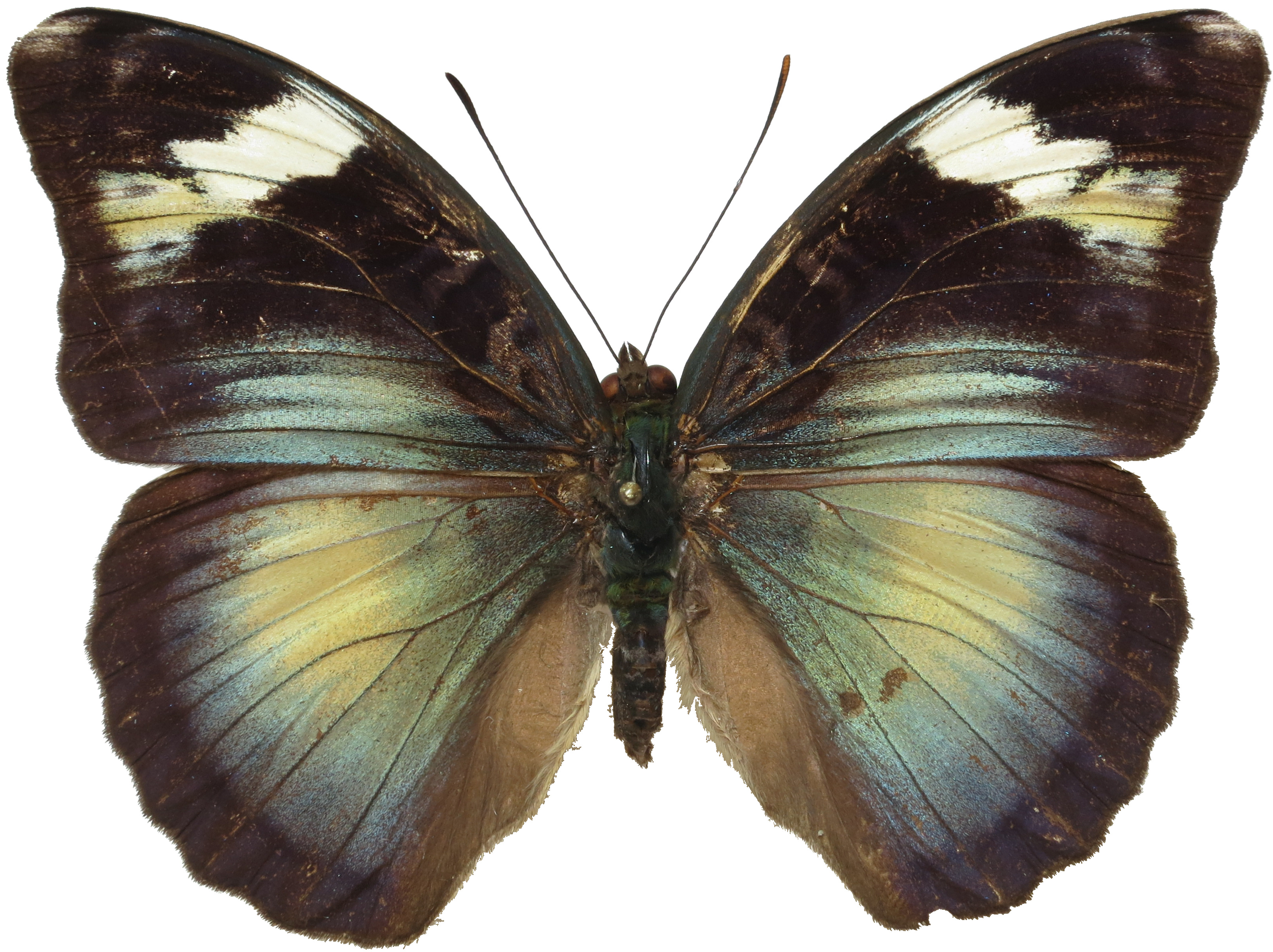
- Female, Mbalmayo, Cameroon

Scientific classification
- Kingdom: Animalia
- Phylum: Arthropoda
- Clade: Pancrustacea
- Class: Insecta
- Order: Lepidoptera
- Family: Nymphalidae
- Genus: Bebearia
- Species: B. laetitia

Binomial name
- Bebearia laetitia (Plötz, 1880)

Synonyms
- Bebearia Euryphene laetitia Plötz, 1880; Bebearia (Bebearia) laetitia; Euryphene laetitia tia Suffert, 1904

= Bebearia laetitia =

Species of butterfly

Bebearia laetitia, or Laetitia's forester, is a butterfly in the family Nymphalidae. It is found in Guinea, Sierra Leone, Liberia, Ivory Coast, Ghana, Nigeria, Cameroon, Gabon, the Republic of the Congo, the Central African Republic, Democratic Republic of the Congo and Uganda. The habitat consists of wetter forests.

E. laetitia Plotz (41 c). In the male the wings are dark olive-brown above with the usual blackish transverse bands; these are all distinct and not or scarcely broken up into spots; the under surface is also dark olive-brown, without distinct dark markings; the distal part is somewhat darker than the basal and on the forewing its proximal boundary is curved, as it begins narrowly at the apex and at the hindmargin reaches the middle; the forewing has two whitish transverse shades in the cell, a whitish spot at the costal margin and one at the apex; at the inner margin of the dark distal part there is in cellule 1 a and in cellule 2 an often indistinct whitish transverse streak; the hindwing has a narrow white transverse streak in cellule 7 and in the anal area is broadly overspread with violet-grey scales. In the female the wings are black-brown above, at the hindmargin of the forewing and on the hindwing beyond the middle green; the fore wing has a white or yellowish subapical band, posteriorly in cellules 3 and 4 always yellowish; beneath this band is pure white and is continued to the hindmargin by a narrow oblique stripe; the under surface lias an ochre-yellowish or light olive ground-colour and for the rest the same white markings as in the male. Sierra Leone to Gaboon. female-ab.tia Suff. differs in the absence of the white submarginal dot in cellule 6 on the upperside of the forewing which occurs in the type-form. Gold Coast.

== Subspecies ==
- Bebearia laetitia laetitia (Guinea, Sierra Leone, Liberia, Ivory Coast, Ghana, Nigeria, Cameroon, Gabon, Congo, Uganda, Democratic Republic of the Congo: Mongala, Uele, Tshopo, Equateur and Lualaba)
- Bebearia laetitia vesta Hecq, 1989 (Central African Republic, Democratic Republic of the Congo: Sankuru)

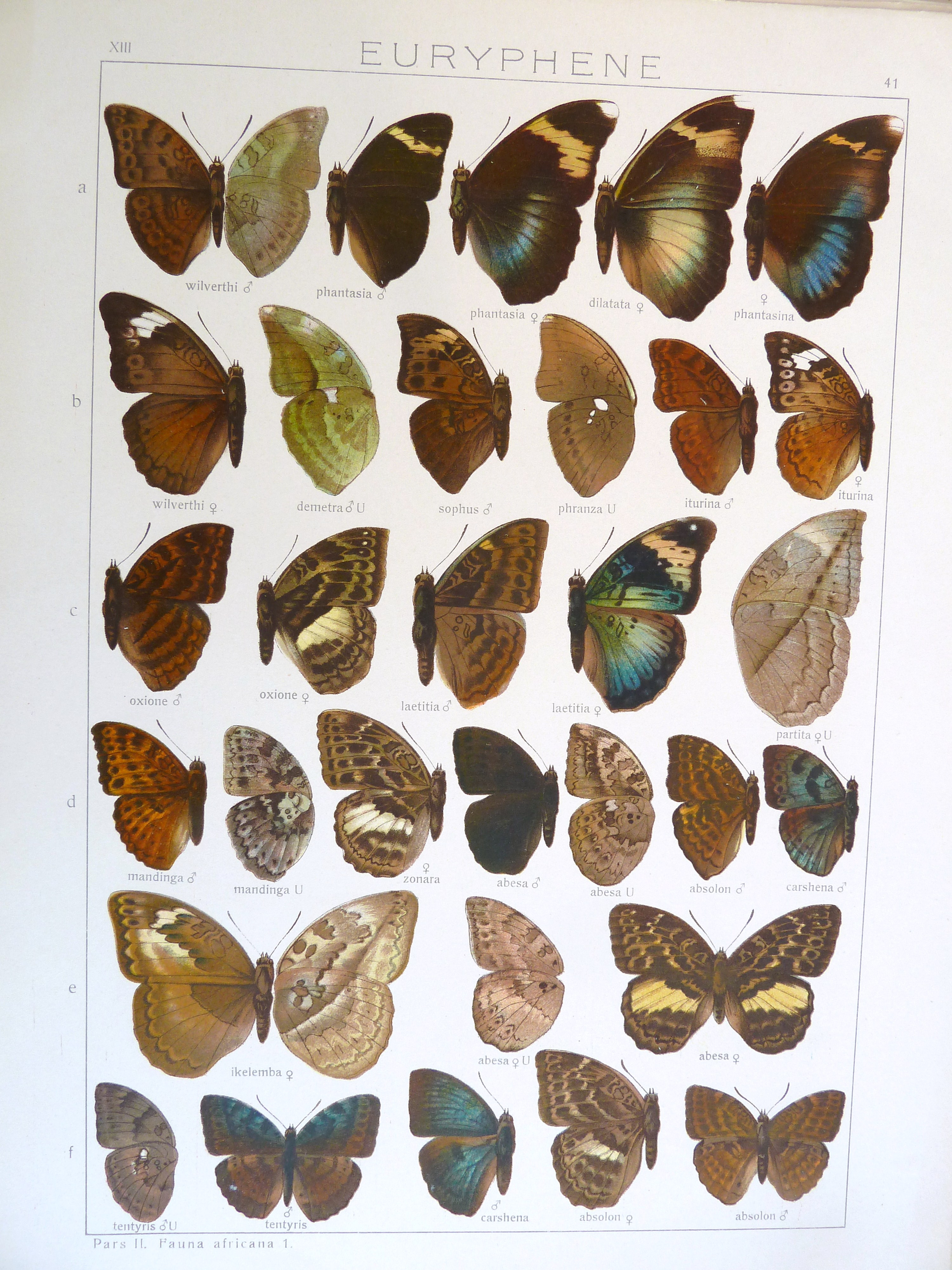
Bebearia laetitia in Adalbert Seitz's Fauna Africana

Torben Larsen developed a species numbering system for his 2005 publication Butterflies of West Africa. The nominate subspecies is #1021. The 'Larsen' numbers have since been used with permission in A Sharp Eye on Butterflies of Ghana.
