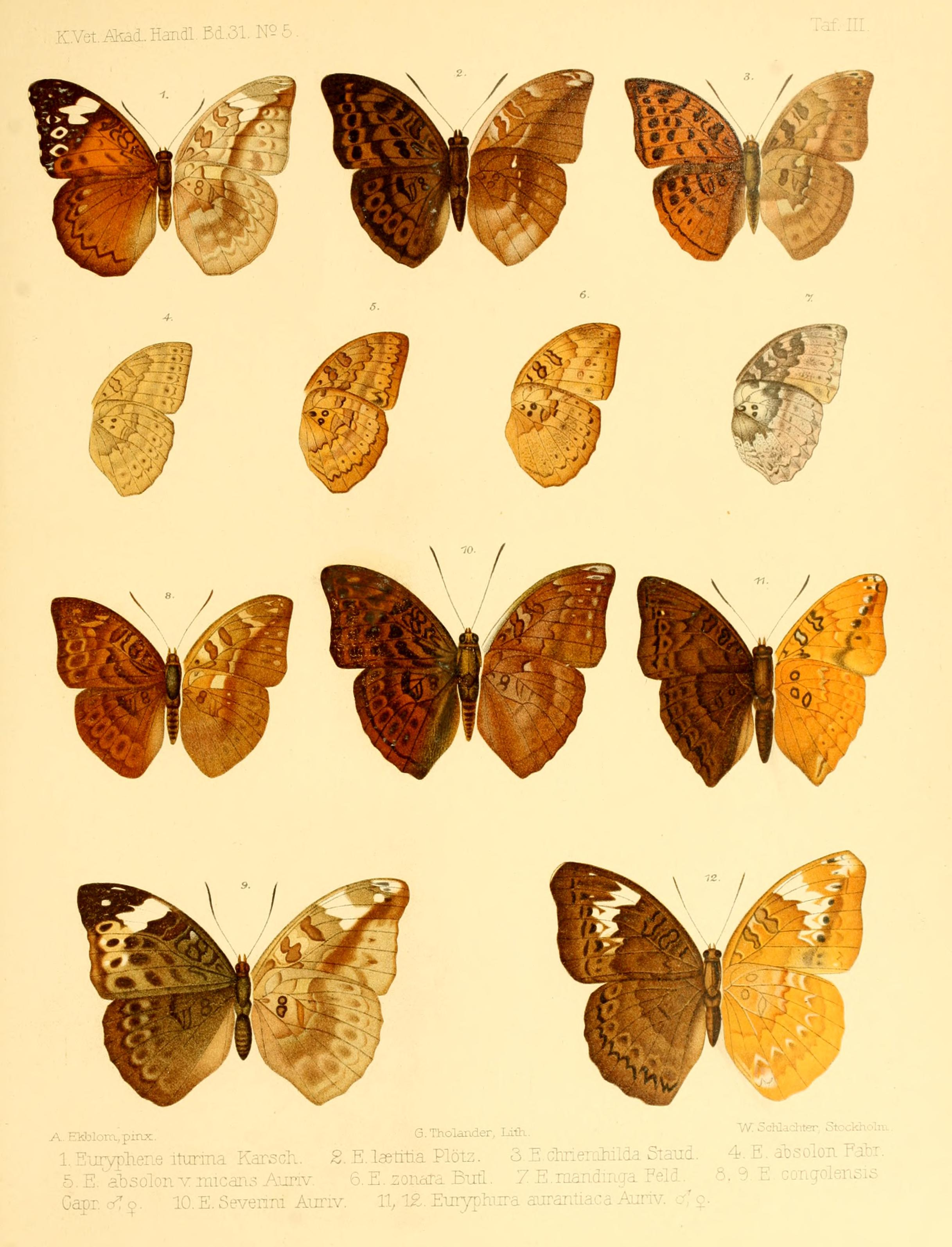
- in Rhopalocera Aethiopica Aurivillius, 1899 (figures 8,9)

Scientific classification
- Kingdom: Animalia
- Phylum: Arthropoda
- Class: Insecta
- Order: Lepidoptera
- Family: Nymphalidae
- Genus: Bebearia
- Species: B. congolensis

Binomial name
- Bebearia congolensis (Capronnier, 1889)

Synonyms
- Euryphene congolensis Capronnier, 1889; Bebearia (Bebearia) congolensis

= Bebearia congolensis =

Species of butterfly

Bebearia congolensis is a butterfly in the family Nymphalidae. It is found in the equatorial zone, possibly including Cameroon, Gabon, the Republic of the Congo and the Democratic Republic of the Congo. The habitat consists of forests.

E. congolensis Capronn. is a third species very nearly allied to Bebearia iturina and Bebearia chriemhilda; it differs from both in having the submarginal line on the upperside of the hindwing formed of proximally open crescents or weakly undulate. In the male the ground-colour of the upper surface is dark yellow-brown and the transverse bands continuous or nearly so; the under surface is very dark brown with two light yellow transverse spots in the cell, a light yellow subapical band on the forewing and a large, almost quadrate light yellow spot before the middle of cellule 7 on the hindwing; the latter is slightly mixed with violet-grey scales at the anal angle. The female differs in having the ground-colour of the upper surface grey-greenish, with only the apex of the forewing outside the subapical band black; the transverse bands are rather distinct but broken up into spots; the subapical band of the forewing is of almost uniform breadth and pure white, posteriorly it is joined to the very thick light yellow rings of the fourth transverse row in cellules 2—4; the under surface is marked like that of the male, but much lighter. Congo to Uganda.
