= List of lycaenid genera: C =

The large butterfly family Lycaenidae contains the following genera starting with the letter C:

- Cacyreus
- Caerofethra
- Caerulea
- Caleta
- Callenya
- Callicista
- Callictita
- Callophrys
- Calycopis
- Camissecla
- Candalides
- Capys
- Castalius
- Catapaecilma
- Catochrysops
- Catopyrops
- Cebrella
- Celastrina
- Celatoxia
- Celmia
- Chaetoprocta
- Chalybs
- Charana
- Chelakina
- Cheritra
- Cheritrella
- Chilades
- Chliaria
- Chloroselas
- Chlorostrymon
- Chrysoritis
- Chrysorychia
- Chrysozephyrus
- Cigaritis
- Citrinophila
- Cnodontes
- Contrafacia
- Cooksonia
- Cordelia
- Coreana
- Creon
- Crimsinota
- Crudaria
- Cupidesthes
- Cupido
- Cupidopsis
- Curetis
- Cyaniriodes
- Cyaniris
- Cyanophrys
- Cyclargus
