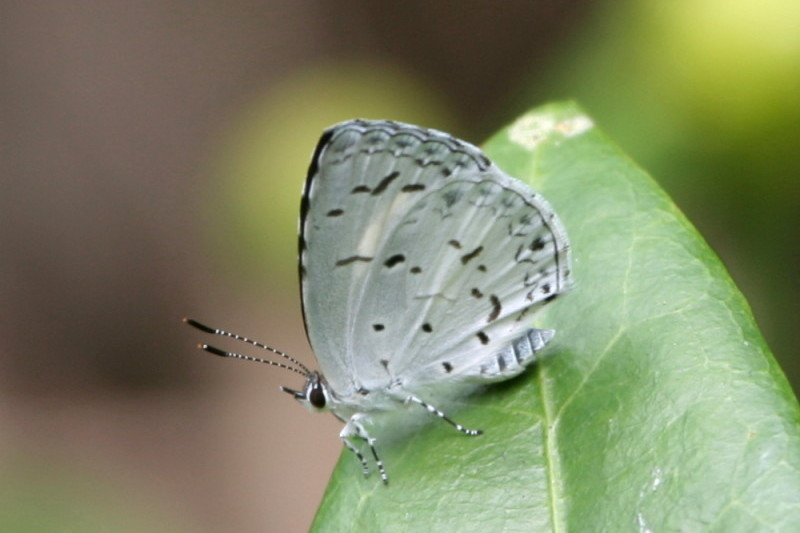

Scientific classification
- Kingdom: Animalia
- Phylum: Arthropoda
- Clade: Pancrustacea
- Class: Insecta
- Order: Lepidoptera
- Family: Lycaenidae
- Genus: Celatoxia
- Species: C. albidisca

Binomial name
- Celatoxia albidisca (Moore, 1883)

Synonyms
- Cyaniris albidisca Moore, 1884; Lycaenopsis albidisca (Moore) Chapman, 1909; Lycaenopsis marginata albidisca (Moore); Fruhstorfer, 1922; Celastrina carna albidisca (Moore) Cantlie, 1963

= Celatoxia albidisca =

White-disc hedge blue

Species of butterfly

Celatoxia albidisca, the white-disc hedge blue, is a small butterfly found in India that belongs to the lycaenids or blues family.

== Description ==
Very closely allied to Cyaniris puspa, the common hedge blue, from which it differs as follows: Male upperside: dull indigo blue, not so dark as C. puspa when looked at from above vertically and with much less refulgent iridescence in an oblique light; the white on both forewings and hindwings much more clearly defined, never diffuse and apparently present at all seasons; on the forewing the white is limited to the basal portions of interspaces 2 and 3 and does not extend into the cell or above vein 4; on the hindwing it occupies the basal half of interspace 6 and is strictly bounded by vein 7 above and vein 6 below. The terminal margins of both forewings and hindwings with much narrower black edgings than in C. puspa. Underside: differs from that of C. puspa in the markings, which are smaller and much more delicate; on the forewing the transverse postdiscal series of abbreviated line-like markings is bisinuate, placed further towards the terminal margin and has the component spots somewhat differently arranged; on the hindwing also the spots on the disc posteriorly are more regular than in C. puspa.

Female: Upperside ground colour and white on disc of wings almost as in C. puspa, but always both in forewings and hindwings more limited, the black costal and terminal margins consequently broader. Underside: the markings as in the male, and therefore differ in a similar manner from those of C. puspa female. Antennae, head, thorax and abdomen in both sexes as in C. puspa.

== Range ==
It is found in South India.

== See also ==
- List of butterflies of India (Lycaenidae)
