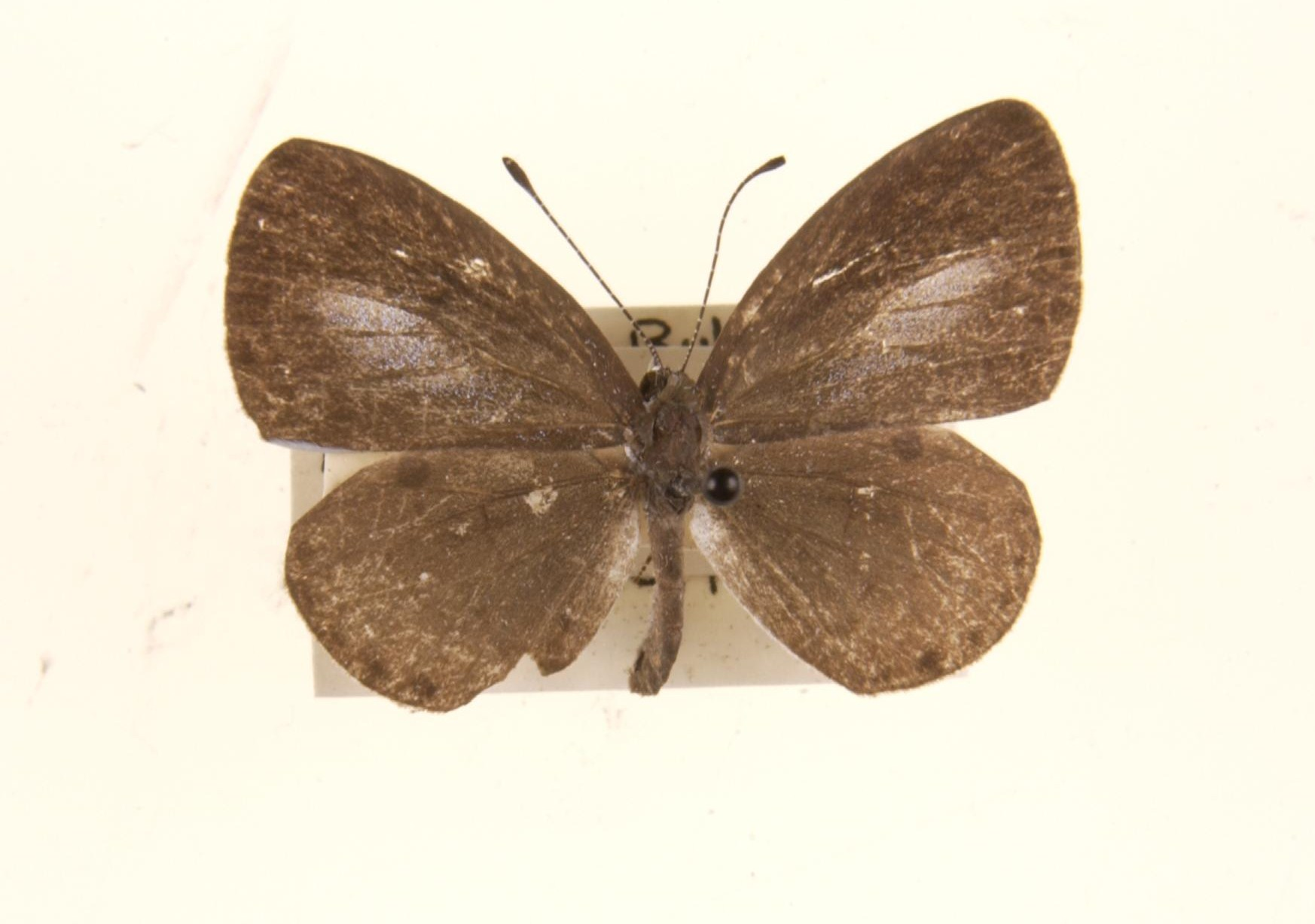
- Specimen from Malaya

Scientific classification
- Kingdom: Animalia
- Phylum: Arthropoda
- Class: Insecta
- Order: Lepidoptera
- Family: Lycaenidae
- Genus: Callenya
- Species: C. melaena

Binomial name
- Callenya melaena (Doherty, 1889)

Synonyms
- Cyaniris melaena Doherty, 1889; Lycaenopsis melaena (Doherty, 1889); Celastrina melaena (Doherty, 1889); Cyaniris melaenoides Tytler, 1915; Lycaenopsis minima Evans, 1932

= Callenya melaena =

Metallic hedge blue

Species of butterfly

Callenya melaena, the metallic hedge blue, is a small butterfly found in India that belongs to the lycaenids or blues family.

== Description ==
Male upperside: deep brown. Forewing: with the basal half dark blue, dull in certain lights, rich, shining and iridescent in others; this colour does not reach the costa, apex or termen where the ground colour forms a broad border to the blue. Hindwing: uniform brown; in certain lights iridescent blue over the basal third, but the blue does not reach either the costa or the dorsum. Underside; dull greyish white. Forewing: with the following fuscous-brown markings: a short transverse line on the discocellulars; a postdiscal transverse series of elongate spots or extremely short bars, the posterior three placed slightly en echelon, the one nearest the costa shifted well inwards; beyond this a transverse unbroken line, a subterminal series of small spots and an anteciliary dark line; costal margin somewhat broadly shaded with very pale brownish grey. Hindwing: a minute spot on dorsum near base of wing, a series of three subbasal spots placed obliquely across the wing and beyond them a much larger round subcostal spot in interspace 7, black; a short dusky brown line on the discocellulars, a brown spot above it in base of interspace 6; a transverse posterior discal series of five spots also brown, the upper four in a slight curve, the lowest shifted outwards out of line with the others; lastly, terminal transverse markings much as on the forewing, only the fuscous brown hue on the inner side of the subterminal series of spots replaced by a series of connected slender lunules. Cilia of forewings and hindwings grey. Antenna, head, thorax and abdomen dark brown, the antennae ringed with white; beneath: palpi, thorax and abdomen greyish white.

== Taxonomy ==
The butterfly was earlier known as Lycaenopsis melaena and was placed in the genus Celastrina.

== Range ==
It is found from Assam to Manipur in India and in Sumatra, Malaya, Indochina, Burma, Thailand and Laos.

== Subspecies ==
- Callenya melaena melaena (Manipur, Burma, northern Thailand, Laos)
- Callenya melaena shonen (Taiwan)
