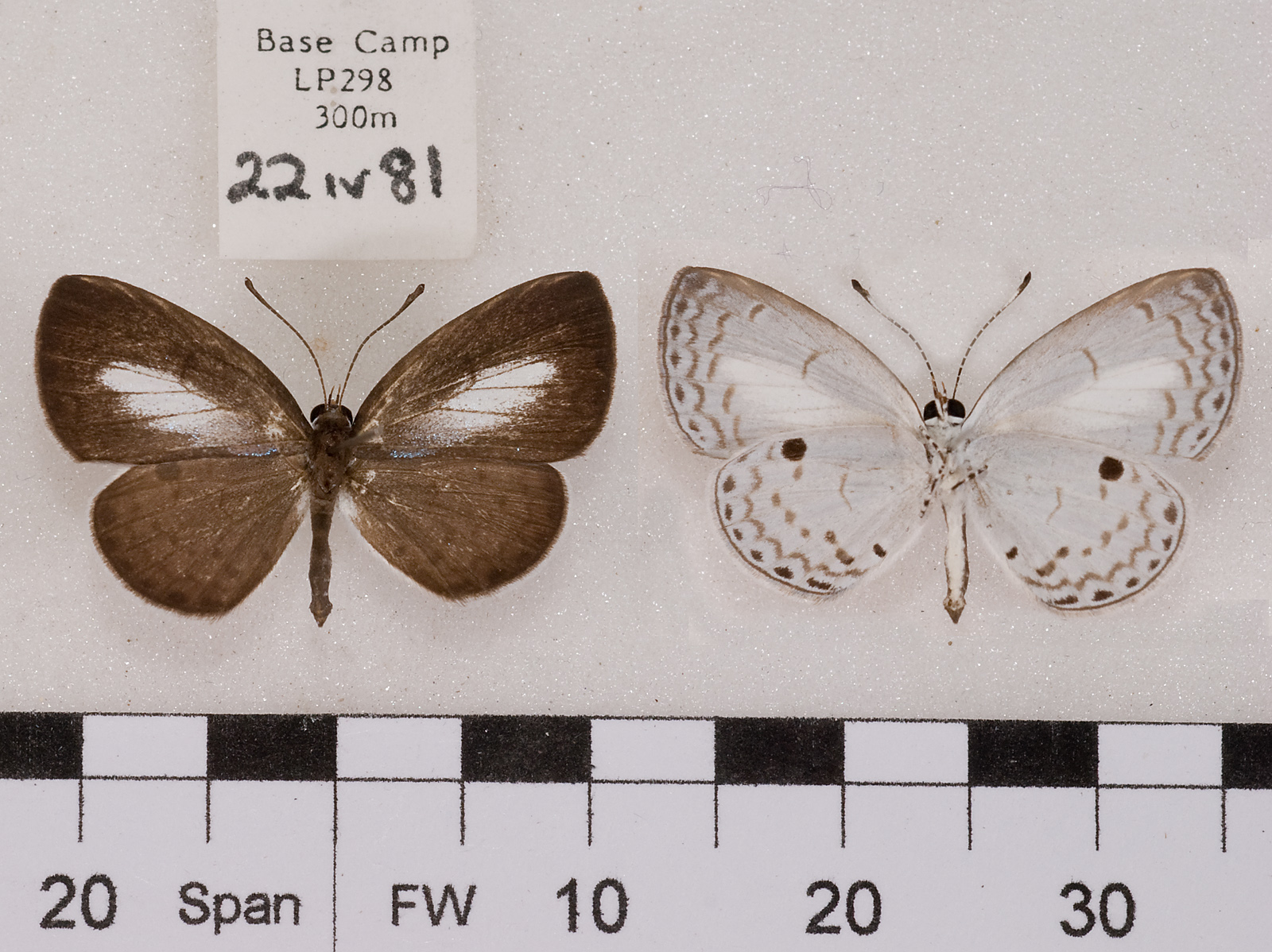

Scientific classification
- Kingdom: Animalia
- Phylum: Arthropoda
- Class: Insecta
- Order: Lepidoptera
- Family: Lycaenidae
- Genus: Callenya
- Species: C. lenya

Binomial name
- Callenya lenya (Evans, 1932)

Synonyms
- Lycaenopsis lenya Evans, 1932; Celastrina cowani Corbet, 1940

= Callenya lenya =

Long-winged hedge blue

Species of butterfly

Callenya lenya, the long-winged hedge blue, is a butterfly of the family Lycaenidae.

== Distribution ==
Callenya lenya is found in southern Burma, Thailand, the Malay Peninsula and Borneo. In Kinabalu Park in Sabah, it is recorded from Kampung Kundasang, the Langganan waterfall, and Kampung Sayap. In Cambodia's Phnom Samkos Wildlife Sanctuary, it is found above 800 metres on the Khamaoch massif.

== Subspecies ==
- Callenya lenya lenya (southern Burma, Thailand, Malay Peninsula, Borneo)
- Callenya lenya baluana (Sabah, Borneo)

== Bibliography ==
- Evans, W.H. (1932). The Identification of Indian Butterflies (2nd ed.). Mumbai, India: Bombay Natural History Society.
- Corbet, A.S.,1940: "Observations on Species of Lycaenidae from the Malay Peninsula (Lepid., Rhop.)". Proceedings Royal Entomological Society, London. (B)9(1):1-6, 7 figures.
