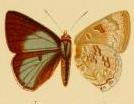

Scientific classification
- Domain: Eukaryota
- Kingdom: Animalia
- Phylum: Arthropoda
- Class: Insecta
- Order: Lepidoptera
- Family: Lycaenidae
- Genus: Cupidesthes
- Species: C. robusta

Binomial name
- Cupidesthes robusta Aurivillius, 1895

= Cupidesthes robusta =

Species of butterfly

Cupidesthes robusta, the robust ciliate blue, is a butterfly in the family Lycaenidae. It is found in eastern Nigeria, Cameroon, the Republic of the Congo and the Central African Republic. The habitat consists of dense, wet forests.
