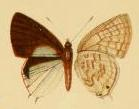

Scientific classification
- Domain: Eukaryota
- Kingdom: Animalia
- Phylum: Arthropoda
- Class: Insecta
- Order: Lepidoptera
- Family: Lycaenidae
- Genus: Cupidesthes
- Species: C. arescopa

Binomial name
- Cupidesthes arescopa Bethune-Baker, 1910

Synonyms
- Cupidesthes hilarion Hulstaert, 1924; Anthene (Cupidesthes) arescopa orientalis Stempffer, 1962

= Cupidesthes arescopa =

Green ciliate blue

Species of butterfly

Cupidesthes arescopa, the green ciliate blue, is a butterfly in the family Lycaenidae. It is found in Nigeria, Cameroon, Gabon, the Republic of the Congo, the Democratic Republic of the Congo, Uganda, Tanzania and Zambia. The habitat consists of forests.

The larvae feed on the leaves of Thea sinensis.

== Subspecies ==
- Cupidesthes arescopa arescopa (southern Nigeria, Cameroon, Gabon, Congo, possibly western Democratic Republic of the Congo)
- Cupidesthes arescopa orientalis (Stempffer, 1962) (Uganda, north-western Tanzania, north-western Zambia, Democratic Republic of the Congo: Uele, Sankuru and Lualaba)
