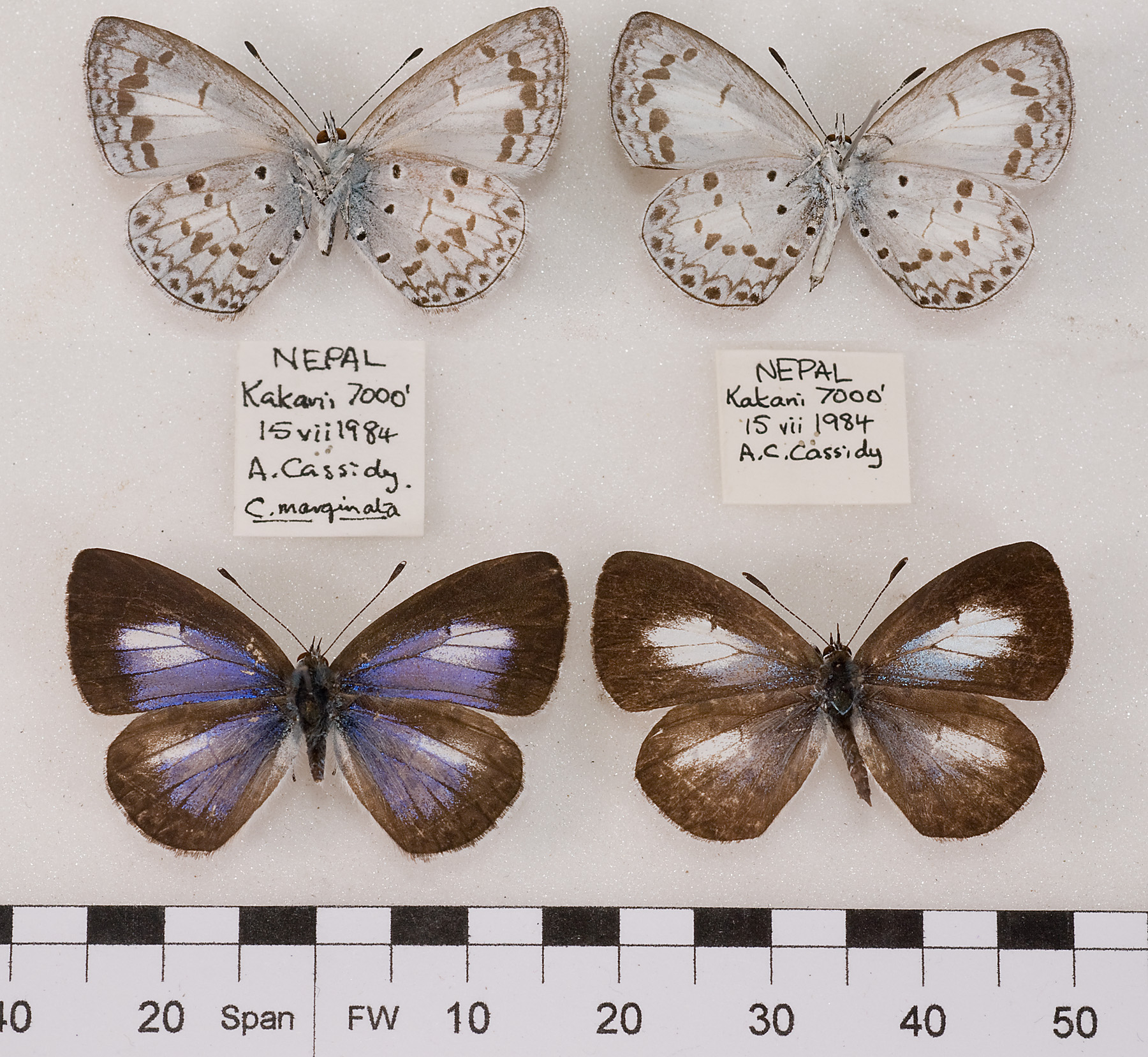

Scientific classification
- Kingdom: Animalia
- Phylum: Arthropoda
- Clade: Pancrustacea
- Class: Insecta
- Order: Lepidoptera
- Family: Lycaenidae
- Genus: Celatoxia
- Species: C. marginata

Binomial name
- Celatoxia marginata (de Nicéville, [1894]

Synonyms
- Cyaniris marginata de Nicéville, [1884]; Celastrina carna marata Corbet, 1936; Cyaniris marginata Moore, [1884]; Cyaniris splendens Butler, 1900

= Celatoxia marginata =

Margined hedge blue

Species of butterfly

Celatoxia marginata, the margined hedge blue, is a species of butterfly belonging to the lycaenid family described by Lionel de Nicéville in 1894. It is found in the Indomalayan realm.

== Subspecies ==
- Celatoxia marginata marginata (Himalayas to Burma, northern Thailand, Laos, northern Vietnam, Yunnan, Taiwan)
- Celatoxia marginata splendens (Butler, 1900) (Malay Peninsula)
