= Cupidesthes jacksoni =

Scientific classification
- Domain: Eukaryota
- Kingdom: Animalia
- Phylum: Arthropoda
- Class: Insecta
- Order: Lepidoptera
- Family: Lycaenidae
- Genus: Cupidesthes
- Species: C. jacksoni

Binomial name
- Cupidesthes jacksoni Stempffer, 1969

Species of butterfly

Cupidesthes jacksoni, the Jackson's ciliate blue, is a butterfly in the family Lycaenidae. It is found in Ivory Coast and Ghana. The habitat consists of wet forests.

Adults of both sexes have been found on the flowers of Eupatorium species.
