= Chelakina =

Scientific classification
- Kingdom: Animalia
- Phylum: Arthropoda
- Class: Insecta
- Order: Lepidoptera
- Family: Lycaenidae
- Genus: Chelakina

Butterfly genus or subgenus

Chelakina is a genus of butterflies in the family Lycaenidae. In some systems, it is considered a subgenus of Cebrella. The genus was established by Eliot & Kawazoé in 1984.
