= Cupidesthes paludicola =

Scientific classification
- Domain: Eukaryota
- Kingdom: Animalia
- Phylum: Arthropoda
- Class: Insecta
- Order: Lepidoptera
- Family: Lycaenidae
- Genus: Cupidesthes
- Species: C. paludicola

Binomial name
- Cupidesthes paludicola (Holland, 1891)

Synonyms
- Lycaena paludicola Holland, 1891; Lycaenesthes brunneus Grose-Smith and Kirby, 1893

Species of butterfly

Cupidesthes paludicola is a butterfly in the family Lycaenidae. It is found in Gabon.
