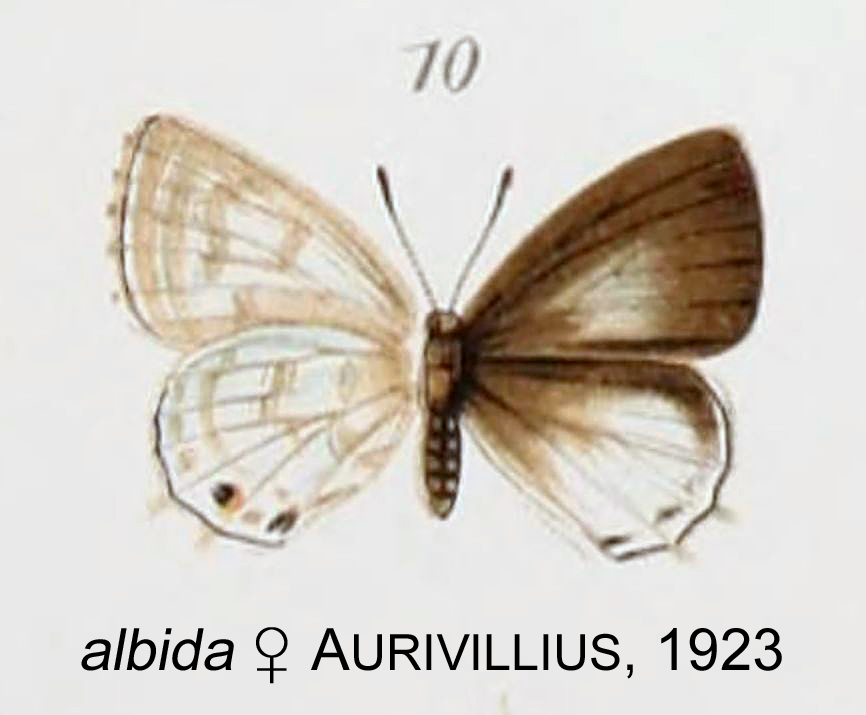

Scientific classification
- Kingdom: Animalia
- Phylum: Arthropoda
- Class: Insecta
- Order: Lepidoptera
- Family: Lycaenidae
- Genus: Cupidesthes
- Species: C. albida

Binomial name
- Cupidesthes albida (Aurivillius, 1923)

Synonyms
- Lycaenesthes albida Aurivillius, 1923

= Cupidesthes albida =

Species of butterfly

Cupidesthes albida is a butterfly in the family Lycaenidae. It is found in Kinshasa in the Democratic Republic of the Congo.
