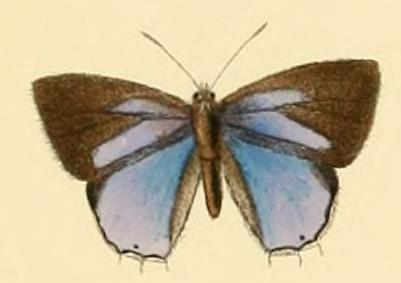

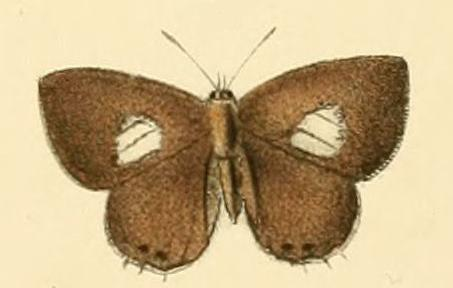

Scientific classification
- Domain: Eukaryota
- Kingdom: Animalia
- Phylum: Arthropoda
- Class: Insecta
- Order: Lepidoptera
- Family: Lycaenidae
- Genus: Cupidesthes
- Species: C. thyrsis

Binomial name
- Cupidesthes thyrsis (Kirby, 1878)

Synonyms
- Lycaenesthes thyrsis Kirby, 1878; Lycaenesthes thyrsis ab. unicolor Aurivillius, 1923

= Cupidesthes thyrsis =

Species of butterfly

Cupidesthes thyrsis is a butterfly in the family Lycaenidae. It is found in Equatorial Guinea (Bioko), Gabon, the Republic of the Congo and the Democratic Republic of the Congo (Ubangi, Uele, Tshopo, Equateur, Kinshasa, Sankuru and Lualaba).

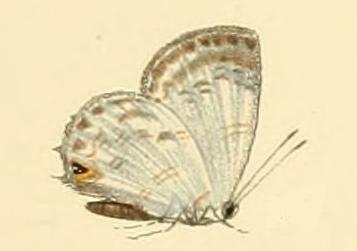
