= Cupidesthes pungusei =

Scientific classification
- Domain: Eukaryota
- Kingdom: Animalia
- Phylum: Arthropoda
- Class: Insecta
- Order: Lepidoptera
- Family: Lycaenidae
- Genus: Cupidesthes
- Species: C. pungusei

Binomial name
- Cupidesthes pungusei Collins & Larsen, 2005

Species of butterfly

Cupidesthes pungusei, the Punguse's ciliate blue, is a butterfly in the family Lycaenidae. It is found in Ghana and possibly Sierra Leone and Cameroon. The habitat consists of dense, wet forests.
