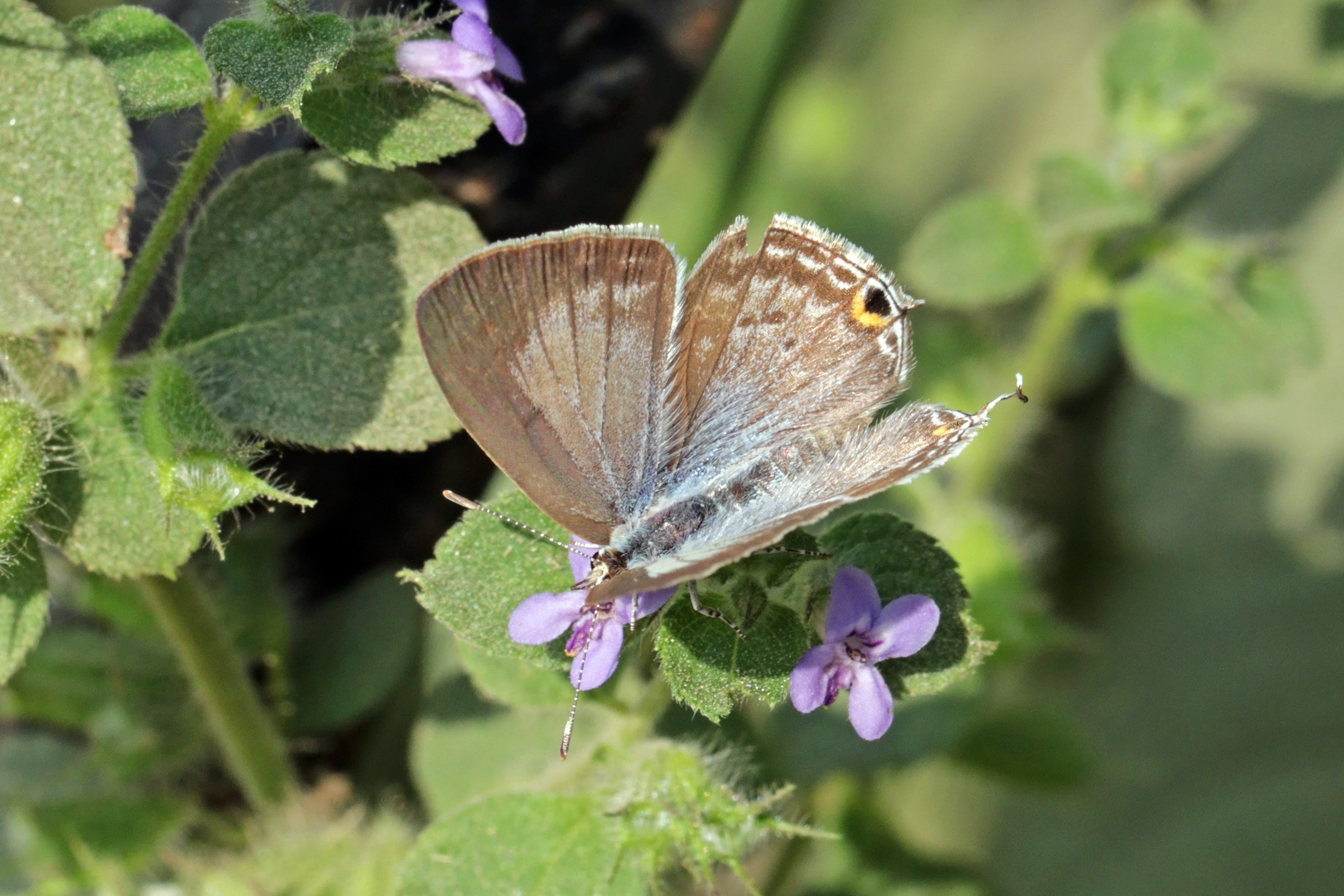

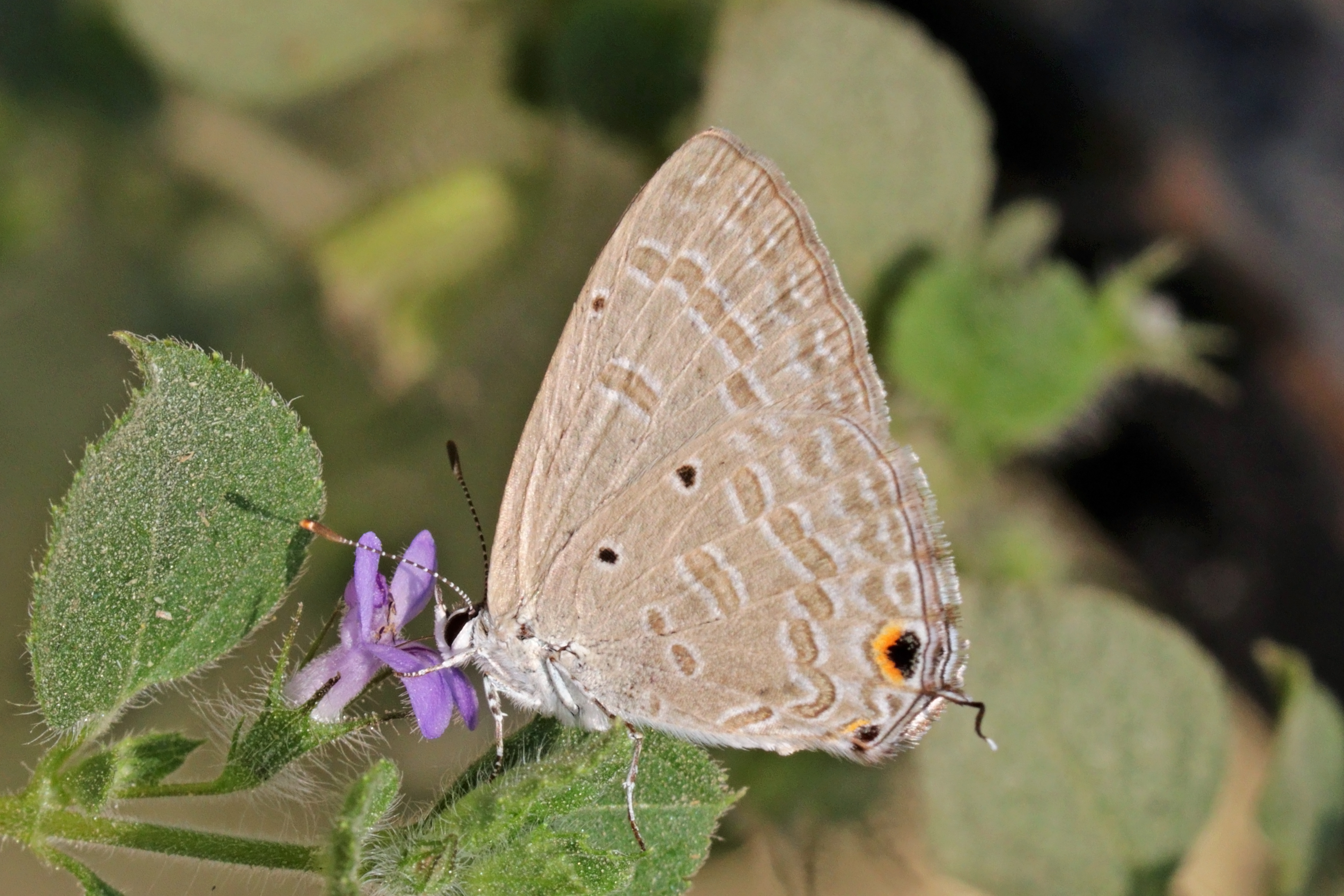
- Both females Nepalgunj, Nepal

Scientific classification
- Kingdom: Animalia
- Phylum: Arthropoda
- Class: Insecta
- Order: Lepidoptera
- Family: Lycaenidae
- Genus: Catochrysops
- Species: C. strabo

Binomial name
- Catochrysops strabo Fabricius, 1793

Synonyms
- Hesperia strabo Fabricius, 1793

= Catochrysops strabo =

Forget-me-not

Species of butterfly

Catochrysops strabo, the forget-me-not, is a small butterfly found in Asia that belongs to the lycaenids or blues family. The species was first described by Johan Christian Fabricius in 1793. It is found in Sri Lanka, Maldives, India, from Sikkim to Indochina and in Sundaland, Sulawesi and the Philippines.

The wingspan is 25–30 mm.

The larvae feed on Ougeinia dalbergioides, Schleichera trijuga and Desmodium species.

== Subspecies ==
- Catochrysops strabo strabo
- Catochrysops strabo asoka (Himalayas, Massuri)
- Catochrysops strabo caledonica (Loyalty)
- Catochrysops strabo celebensis (Sulawesi, Tukangbesi, Kalao, Buton, Sula, Maluku)
- Catochrysops strabo lithargyria (Sri Lanka, Assam, Burma)
- Catochrysops strabo luzonensis (Philippines, Palawan, Talaud, Sangihe)
- Catochrysops strabo naerina (Mentawi)

== Description ==
=== Male ===
Upperside: Pale violet with in certain lights a blue, slightly silvery sheen. Forewing: a slender anteciliary dark line. Hindwing: interspace 1 with a short transverse subterminal brown bar edged inwardly with white; interspace 2 with a prominent round black spot edged very faintly on the inner side by a diffuse bluish lunule; the dark subterminal spots of the underside apparent through transparency; an anteciliary slender jet-black line more conspicuous than in the forewing, in some specimens edged inwardly in the posterior interspaces with white; this line is present in interspaces 1 and 2 in all specimens. Cilia of both forewings and hindwings white transversely traversed medially by a brown line; tail black tipped with white.

Underside; pale dull grey. Forewing: a short transverse band on the discocellulars, a small round subcostal spot in interspace 10, a transverse discal band that extends from veins 1 to 7, the portion below vein 3 dislocated and shifted inwards, a transverse subterminal ill-defined band and a terminal series of inwardly rounded spots, each of which subapically fills an interspace, dark greyish brown; the discocellular and discal bands edged inwardly and outwardly by white lines, the subcostal spot encircled with white and the subterminal band and terminal spots edged on their inner sides with the same colour; lastly, a dark greyish-brown anteciliary line. Hindwing: a subbasal spot and a spot beyond it in interspace 7, a large round subterminal spot crowned with ochraceous in interspace 2, two geminate (paired) specks subterminally in interspace 1 and a terminal similar speck in interspace 1a, black, the spots in interspace 7 encircled with white; a lunular spot in middle of cell, two elongate spots in transverse order below it, a short transverse band on the discocellulars and a very irregular, transverse, sinuous discal band dark greyish brown, edged inwardly and outwardly with white; beyond these is an inner subterminal series of greyish-brown lunules followed by an outer subterminal series of similarly coloured spots, the latter encircled with white, and a black anteciliary slender line. Antennae, head, thorax and abdomen dark brown, a little purplish on the thorax, the shafts of the antennas speckled with white; beneath: the palpi, thorax and abdomen white.

=== Female ===
Upperside, forewing: costa, apex and termen broadly brownish black, rest of the wing whitish, flushed and overlaid especially at base with metallic blue. Hindwing: costa and termen broadly fuscous or brownish black, the rest of the wing whitish flushed with metallic blue as on the forewing which, however, does not spread to the dorsal margin; a discal curved medial series of fuscous spots; a transverse, incomplete, postdiscal series of white sagittate (arrowhead shaped) lunules followed by a subterminal series of spots as follows, superposed on the brownish-black terminal border: two black geminate dots margined inwardly and outwardly with white, a large black spot crowned broadly with ochraceous inwardly and edged slenderly with white on the outer side in interspace 2, and anterior to that a transversely linear black spot encircled with white in each interspace. Cilia of forewing brown, of hindwing white traversed by a transverse medial brown line.

Underside: ground colour and markings as in the male. Antennas, head, thorax and abdomen similar to those of the male. Eyes in both sexes hairy.

== Distribution ==
This species resides in Peninsular India south of the outer ranges of the Himalayas; Ceylon; Assam; Burma; Tenasserim; the Andamans; Nicobars; extending through the Malayan subregion down to Australia.

== Larva ==
"Of the usual shape (i. e. onisciform); head light yellow margined with brown; body light rose, covered with tiny star-topped stems so arranged as to make diagonal whitish lines to each segment; a subdorsal line on the back; anal segment nearly square, the margins of the body clothed with light coloured and longish hair". (Davidson, Bell & Aitken)

== Pupa ==
"Of the usual form, covered with stiff erect hair; colour light rose with a black patch on the second segment and centre of thorax; it has also a dark dorsal line and the lower segments are smudged with black". (Davidson, Bell & Aitken)

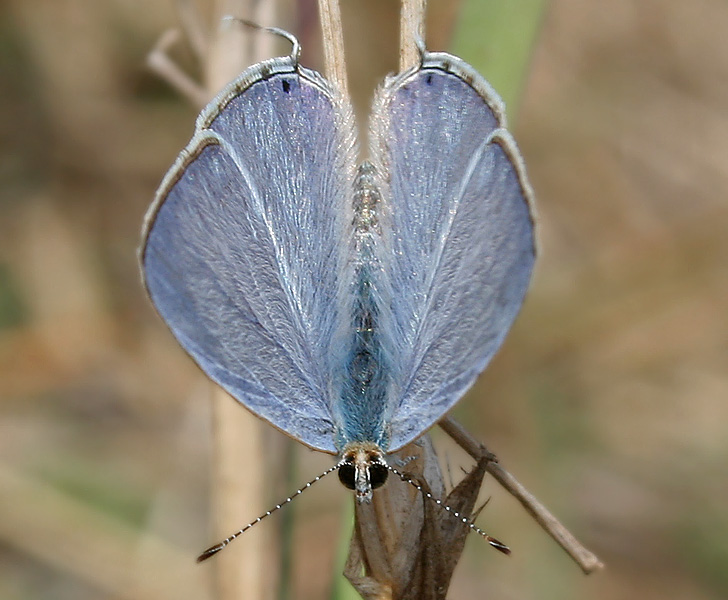
Male in Hyderabad, India

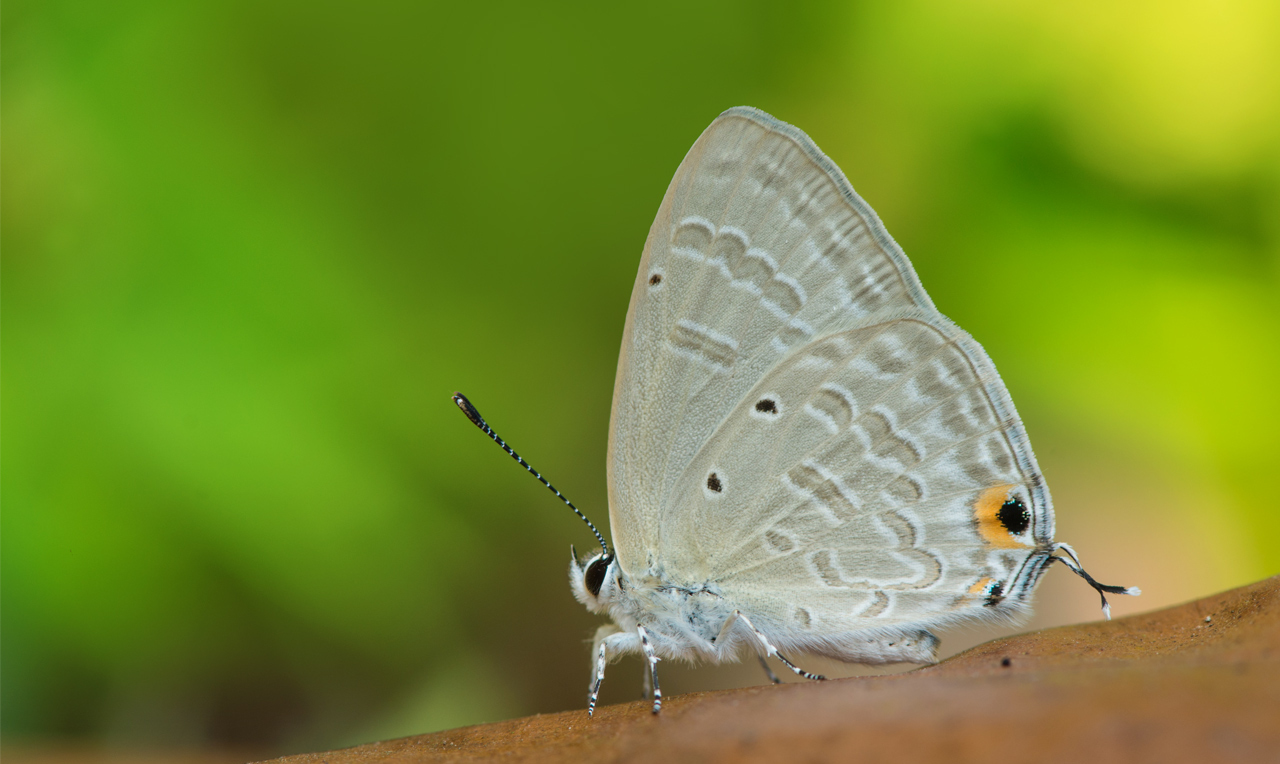
In Kerala

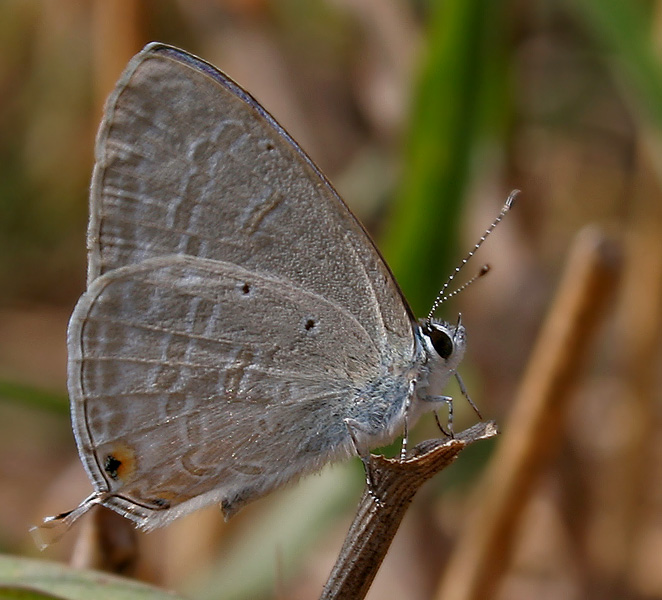
Male in Hyderabad

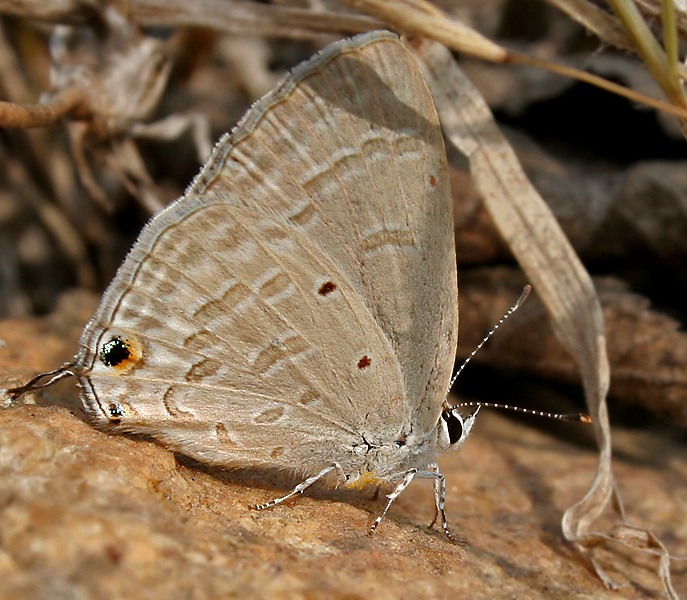
Female in Hyderabad

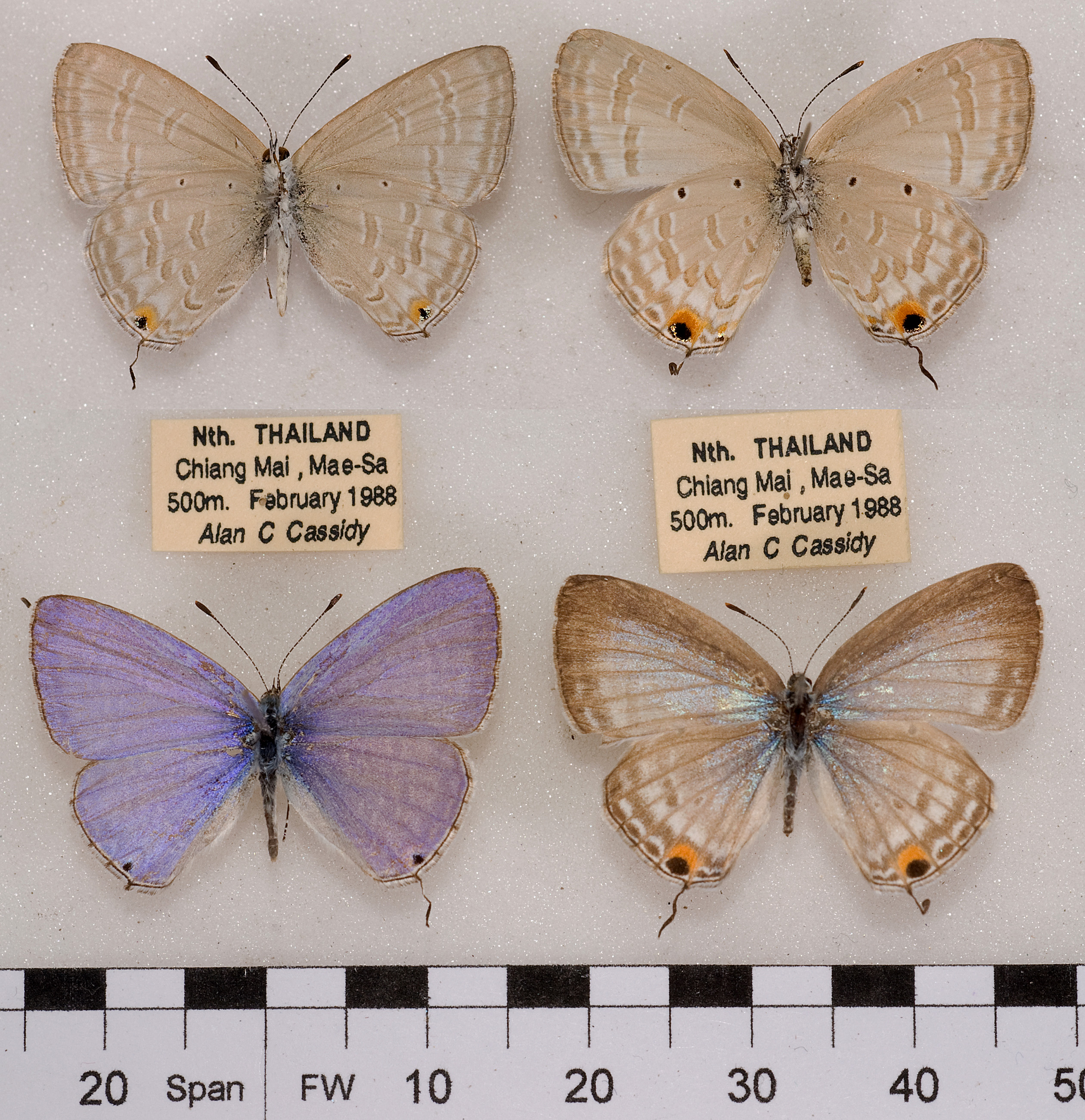
