= Cupidesthes caerulea =

Scientific classification
- Kingdom: Animalia
- Phylum: Arthropoda
- Class: Insecta
- Order: Lepidoptera
- Family: Lycaenidae
- Genus: Cupidesthes
- Species: C. caerulea

Binomial name
- Cupidesthes caerulea Jackson, 1966

Species of butterfly

Cupidesthes caerulea is a butterfly in the family Lycaenidae. It is found in Cameroon and the Republic of the Congo.
