= Cupidesthes paralithas =

Scientific classification
- Domain: Eukaryota
- Kingdom: Animalia
- Phylum: Arthropoda
- Class: Insecta
- Order: Lepidoptera
- Family: Lycaenidae
- Genus: Cupidesthes
- Species: C. paralithas

Binomial name
- Cupidesthes paralithas Bethune-Baker, 1926

Species of butterfly

Cupidesthes paralithas, the precise ciliate blue, is a butterfly in the family Lycaenidae. It is found in Nigeria (east and the Cross River loop) and Cameroon. The habitat consists of forests.
