= Cupidesthes cuprifascia =

Scientific classification
- Domain: Eukaryota
- Kingdom: Animalia
- Phylum: Arthropoda
- Class: Insecta
- Order: Lepidoptera
- Family: Lycaenidae
- Genus: Cupidesthes
- Species: C. cuprifascia

Binomial name
- Cupidesthes cuprifascia Joicey & Talbot, 1921

Species of butterfly

Cupidesthes cuprifascia is a butterfly in the family Lycaenidae. It is found in the Republic of the Congo and Tshopo in the Democratic Republic of the Congo.
