= Cupidesthes vidua =

Scientific classification
- Domain: Eukaryota
- Kingdom: Animalia
- Phylum: Arthropoda
- Class: Insecta
- Order: Lepidoptera
- Family: Lycaenidae
- Genus: Cupidesthes
- Species: C. vidua

Binomial name
- Cupidesthes vidua Talbot, 1929

Species of butterfly

Cupidesthes vidua is a butterfly in the family Lycaenidae. It is found in Angola and Zambia.
