= Cupidesthes mimetica =

Black-spotted ciliate blue

Scientific classification
- Domain: Eukaryota
- Kingdom: Animalia
- Phylum: Arthropoda
- Class: Insecta
- Order: Lepidoptera
- Family: Lycaenidae
- Genus: Cupidesthes
- Species: C. mimetica

Binomial name
- Cupidesthes mimetica (H. H. Druce, 1910)

Synonyms
- Lycaenesthes mimetica H. H. Druce, 1910; Cupidesthes mimetica Bethune-Baker, 1910

Species of butterfly

Cupidesthes mimetica, the black-spotted ciliate blue, is a butterfly in the family Lycaenidae. The species was first described by Hamilton Herbert Druce in 1910. It is found in Ivory Coast, Ghana, western Nigeria, Cameroon and the Republic of the Congo. The habitat consists of forests.
