= Cupidopsis iobates =

Tailed meadow blue
- Cupidopsis iobates iobates

Scientific classification
- Kingdom: Animalia
- Phylum: Arthropoda
- Clade: Pancrustacea
- Class: Insecta
- Order: Lepidoptera
- Family: Lycaenidae
- Genus: Cupidopsis
- Species: C. iobates

Binomial name
- Cupidopsis iobates (Hopffer, 1855)

Synonyms
- Lycaena jobates Hopffer, 1855; Cupidopsis mauritanica Riley, 1932; Cupidopsis jobates; Cupidopsis iobates uranochroa Ungemach, 1932; Lycaena siwani Trimen, 1862; Cupido iobates ab. conjugens Strand, 1912; Cupido jobates ab. ochreopuncta Aurivillius, 1925

Species of butterfly

Cupidopsis iobates, the tailed meadow blue, is a butterfly of the family Lycaenidae. It is found in most of Africa, south of the Sahara.

The wingspan is 23–30 mm for males and 26–33 mm for females. Adults are on wing from September to April and May and sometimes in June and July in subtropical areas.

The larvae feed on the flowers of low-growing grassland Fabaceae species, including Rhynchosia puberula.

== Subspecies ==
- Cupidopsis iobates iobates (from Kenya and Uganda to the Cape, Angola, Zaire, Togo, Benin, Guinea, Madagascar)
- Cupidopsis iobates mauritanica Riley, 1932 (Mauritania, Senegal, Guinea, Ivory Coast, Ghana, Togo, Benin, Nigeria to Ethiopia)
