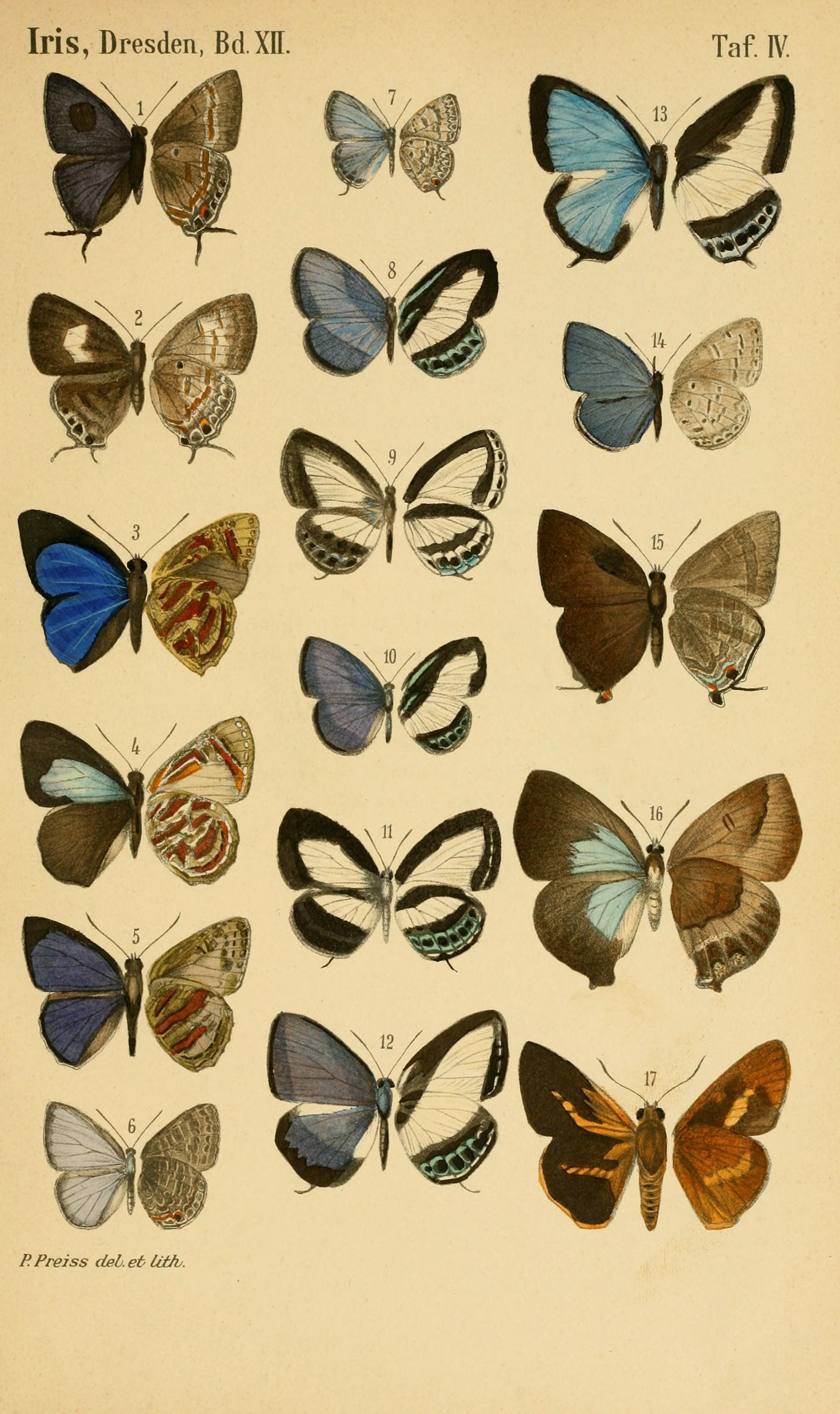
- Plate accompanying the original description (figure 7, male)

Scientific classification
- Domain: Eukaryota
- Kingdom: Animalia
- Phylum: Arthropoda
- Class: Insecta
- Order: Lepidoptera
- Family: Lycaenidae
- Genus: Catopyrops
- Species: C. kokopona

Binomial name
- Catopyrops kokopona (Ribbe, 1899)

= Catopyrops kokopona =

Species of butterfly

Catopyrops kokopona is a species of butterfly belonging to the lycaenid family described by Carl Ribbe in 1899. It is endemic to New Britain.
