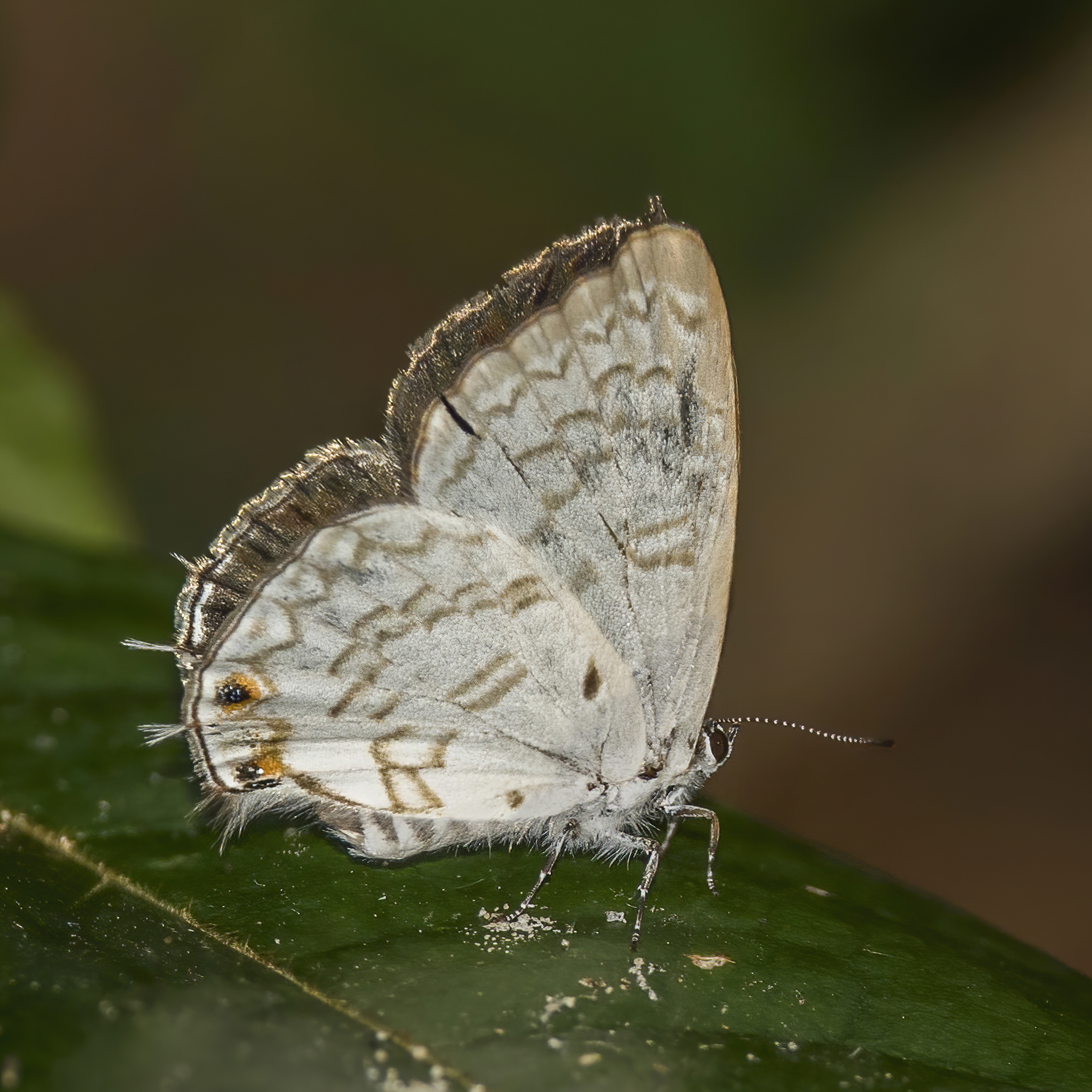
- In Ghana

Scientific classification
- Kingdom: Animalia
- Phylum: Arthropoda
- Clade: Pancrustacea
- Class: Insecta
- Order: Lepidoptera
- Family: Lycaenidae
- Genus: Cupidesthes
- Species: C. lithas

Binomial name
- Cupidesthes lithas (H. H. Druce, 1890)

Synonyms
- Lycaenesthes lithas H. H. Druce, 1890; Lycaenesthes voltae Sharpe, 1890; Lycaenesthes voltae var. gabunica Aurivillius, 1899

= Cupidesthes lithas =

Volta ciliate blue

Species of butterfly

Cupidesthes lithas, the Volta ciliate blue, is a butterfly in the family Lycaenidae. The species was first described by Hamilton Herbert Druce in 1890. It is found in Guinea, Sierra Leone, Liberia, Ivory Coast, Ghana, southern Nigeria, Cameroon, Gabon, the Democratic Republic of the Congo (Ituri, Équateur, Kinshasa, Kasai and Lualaba) and Uganda. The habitat consists of forests.

Torben Larsen developed a species numbering system for his 2005 publication Butterflies of West Africa. This species is #562. The 'Larsen' numbers have since been used with permission in A Sharp Eye on Butterflies of Ghana.
