= Catochrysops lithargyria =

Silver forget-me-not

Scientific classification
- Domain: Eukaryota
- Kingdom: Animalia
- Phylum: Arthropoda
- Class: Insecta
- Order: Lepidoptera
- Family: Lycaenidae
- Genus: Catochrysops
- Species: C. lithargyria

Binomial name
- Catochrysops lithargyria Doherty 1891

Species of butterfly

Catochrysops lithargyria, the silver forget-me-not, is a small butterfly found in India that belongs to the lycaenids or blues family.

== See also ==
- List of butterflies of India
- List of butterflies of India (Lycaenidae)
