= Cupidopsis cissus =

Common meadow blue

Scientific classification
- Kingdom: Animalia
- Phylum: Arthropoda
- Clade: Pancrustacea
- Class: Insecta
- Order: Lepidoptera
- Family: Lycaenidae
- Genus: Cupidopsis
- Species: C. cissus

Binomial name
- Cupidopsis cissus (Godart, [1824])

Synonyms
- Polyommatus cissus Godart, [1824]; Lycaena catharina Trimen, 1862; Lampides abberans Butler, 1878; Cupido cissus f. albiradiatus Stoneham, 1938; Cupido cissus f. immaculatus Stoneham, 1938

Species of butterfly

Cupidopsis cissus, the common meadow blue, is a butterfly of the family Lycaenidae. It is found in most of Africa, south of the Sahara.

The wingspan is 22–34 mm for males and 23–36 mm for females. Adults are on wing from September to April and May and sometimes in June and July in subtropical areas.

The larvae feed on the flowers of Eriosema and Vigna species.

== Subspecies ==
- Cupidopsis cissus cissus (Senegal: Basse Casamance and south-east, Guinea, Burkina Faso, Sierra Leone, Liberia, Ivory Coast, Ghana, Togo, Nigeria: south and the Cross River loop, Kenya, northern Zambia, Mozambique, Zimbabwe, Botswana, Namibia, Eswatini, Lesotho, Madagascar, South Africa)
- Cupidopsis cissus extensa Libert, 2003 (Gabon, Congo, Angola, Democratic Republic of the Congo)

Torben Larsen developed a species numbering system for his 2005 publication Butterflies of West Africa. The nominate subspecies is #596. The 'Larsen' numbers have since been used with permission in A Sharp Eye on Butterflies of Ghana.
