= Cupidesthes ysobelae =

Scientific classification
- Domain: Eukaryota
- Kingdom: Animalia
- Phylum: Arthropoda
- Class: Insecta
- Order: Lepidoptera
- Family: Lycaenidae
- Genus: Cupidesthes
- Species: C. ysobelae

Binomial name
- Cupidesthes ysobelae Jackson, 1966

Species of butterfly

Cupidesthes ysobelae is a butterfly in the family Lycaenidae. It is found in Uganda, Tanzania (from the western part of the country to the Mpanda area) and possibly the Democratic Republic of the Congo.
