= Cupidesthes salvatoris =

Scientific classification
- Domain: Eukaryota
- Kingdom: Animalia
- Phylum: Arthropoda
- Class: Insecta
- Order: Lepidoptera
- Family: Lycaenidae
- Genus: Cupidesthes
- Species: C. salvatoris

Binomial name
- Cupidesthes salvatoris Belcastro & Larsen, 2005

Species of butterfly

Cupidesthes salvatoris, the Salvatore's ciliate blue, is a butterfly in the family Lycaenidae. It is found in Sierra Leone.
