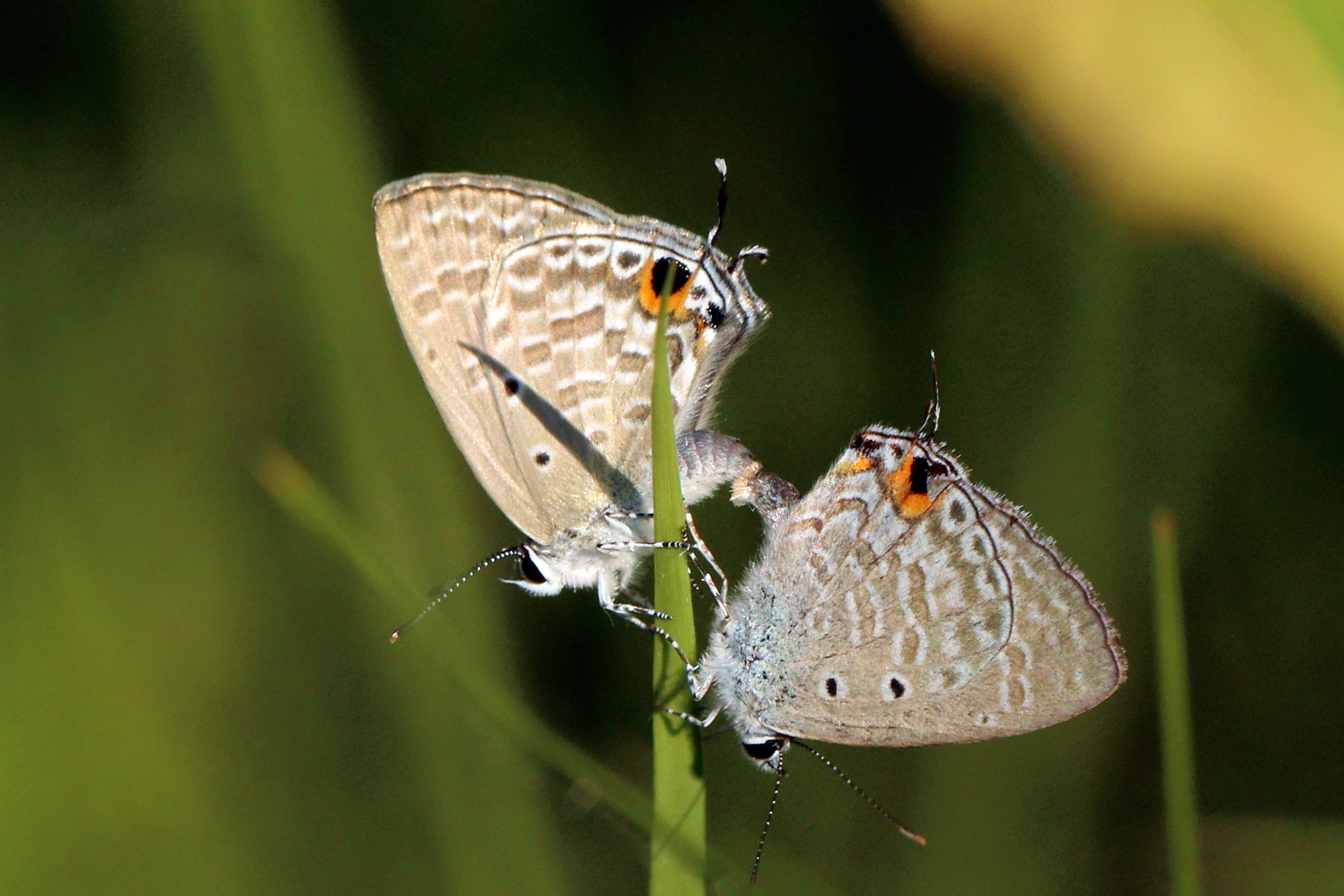
- C. p. exiguus mating, Indonesia

Scientific classification
- Domain: Eukaryota
- Kingdom: Animalia
- Phylum: Arthropoda
- Class: Insecta
- Order: Lepidoptera
- Family: Lycaenidae
- Genus: Catochrysops
- Species: C. panormus

Binomial name
- Catochrysops panormus (C. Felder, 1860)

Subspecies
- Ten, see text

Synonyms
- Lycaena panormus

= Catochrysops panormus =

Silver forget-me-not

Species of butterfly

Catochrysops panormus, the silver forget-me-not, is a small butterfly found from India to the Philippines and south to Australia that belongs to the lycaenids or blues family. The species was first described by Cajetan Felder in 1860.

== Subspecies ==
Listed alphabetically:

- C. p. batchiana Tite, 1959 – Bachan, Halmahera, Obi
- C. p. caerulea Tite, 1959 – New Hebrides
- C. p. caledonica Felder – Loyalty Islands
- C. p. exiguus (Distant, 1886) – India, Sumatra, Taiwan, southern Yunnan
- C. p. panormus Sri Lanka, Indochina
- C. p. papuana Tite, 1959 – Aru, West Papua, Papua, Bismarck Archipelago
- C. p. platissa (Herrich-Schäffer, 1869) – Torres Strait Islands, northern Australia - New South Wales (Byron Bay)
- C. p. pura Tite, 1959 – Solomon Islands (not Rennell Island)
- C. p. rennellensis Howarth, 1962 – Rennell Island
- C. p. timorensis Tite, 1959 – Timor, Wetar, Kissar

The subspecies of Catochrysops panormus found in India are:

- C. p. exiguus Distant, 1886 – Malay silver forget-me-not
- C. p. andamanica Tite, 1959 – Andaman silver forget-me-not

== Gallery ==
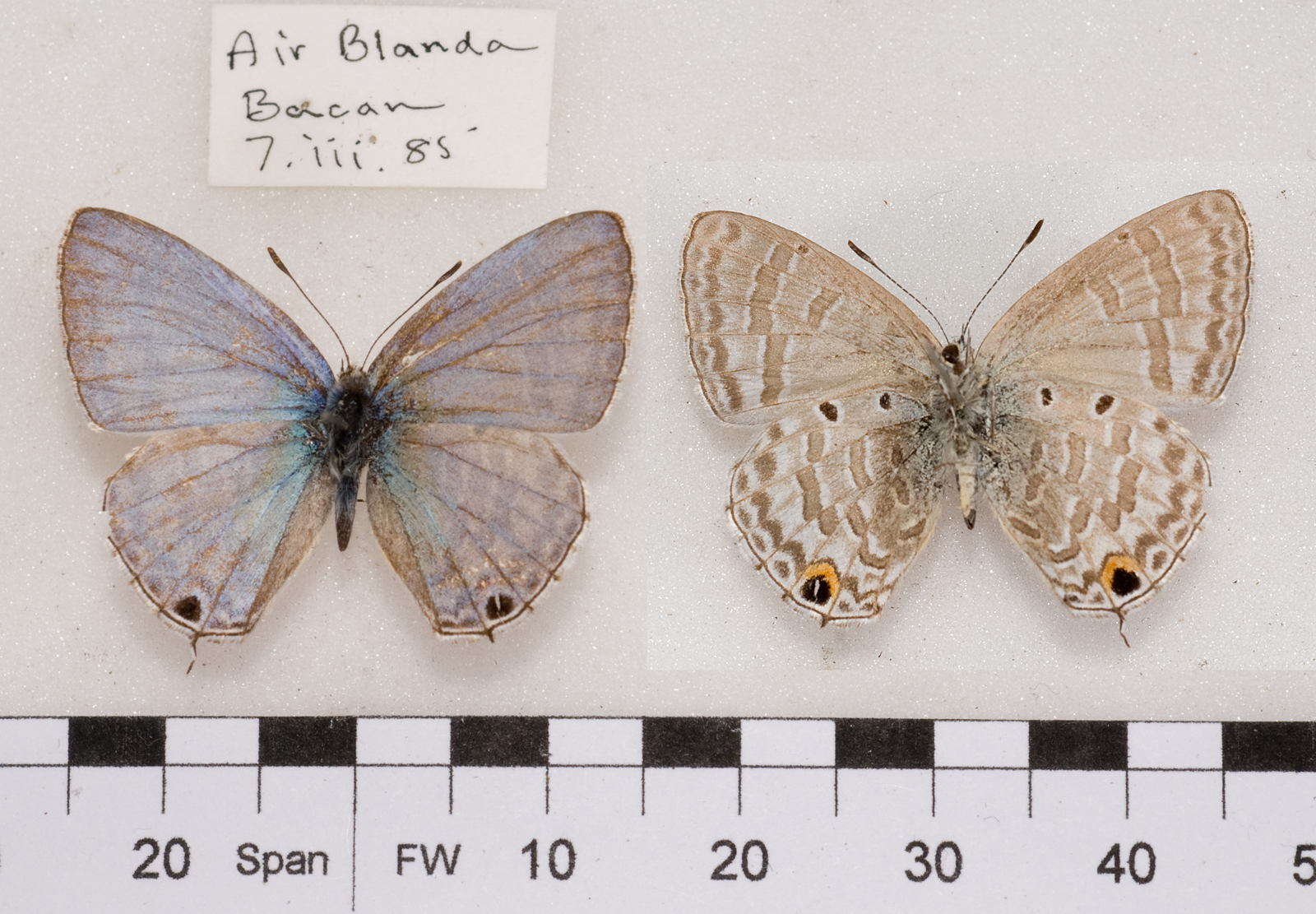

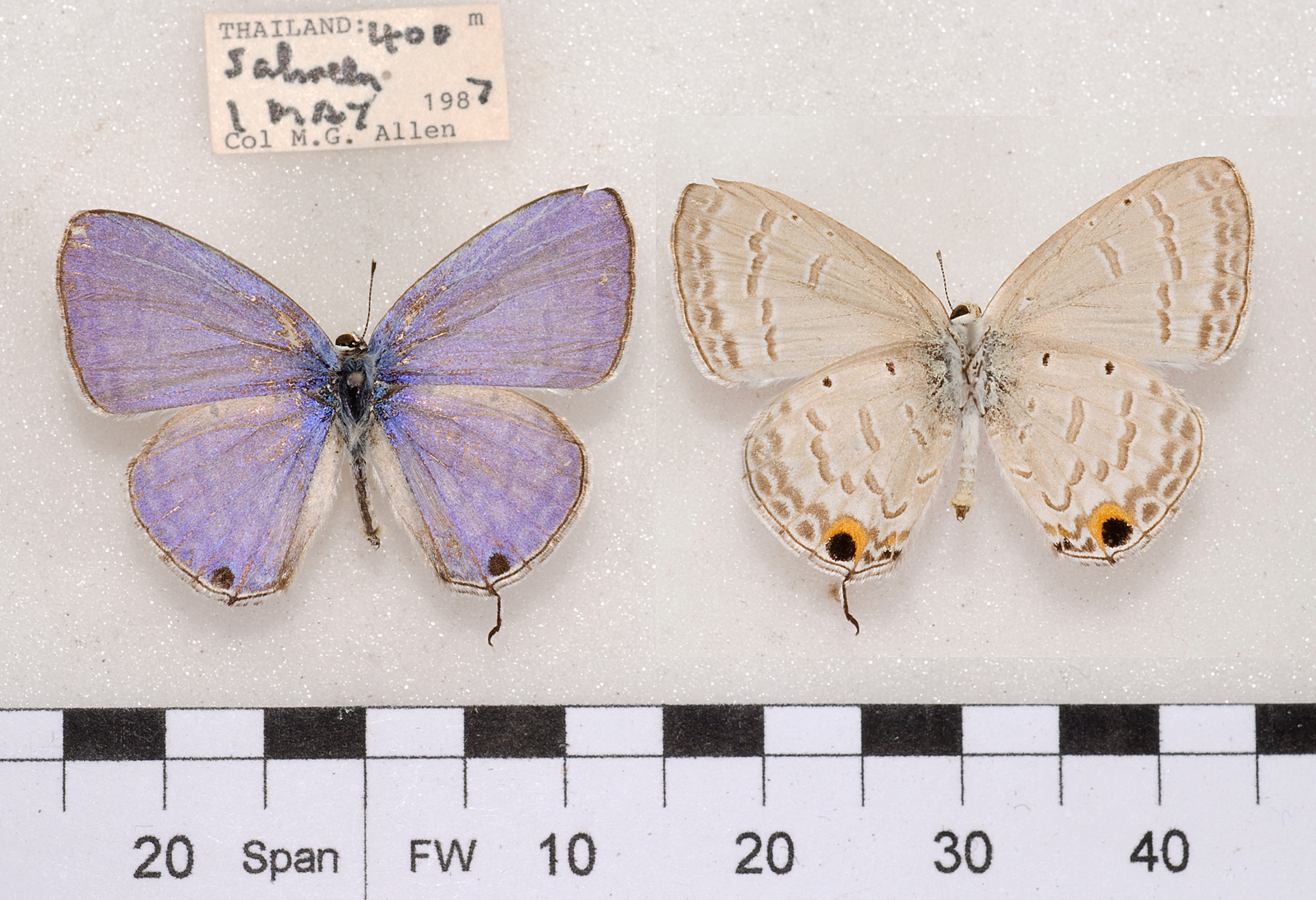

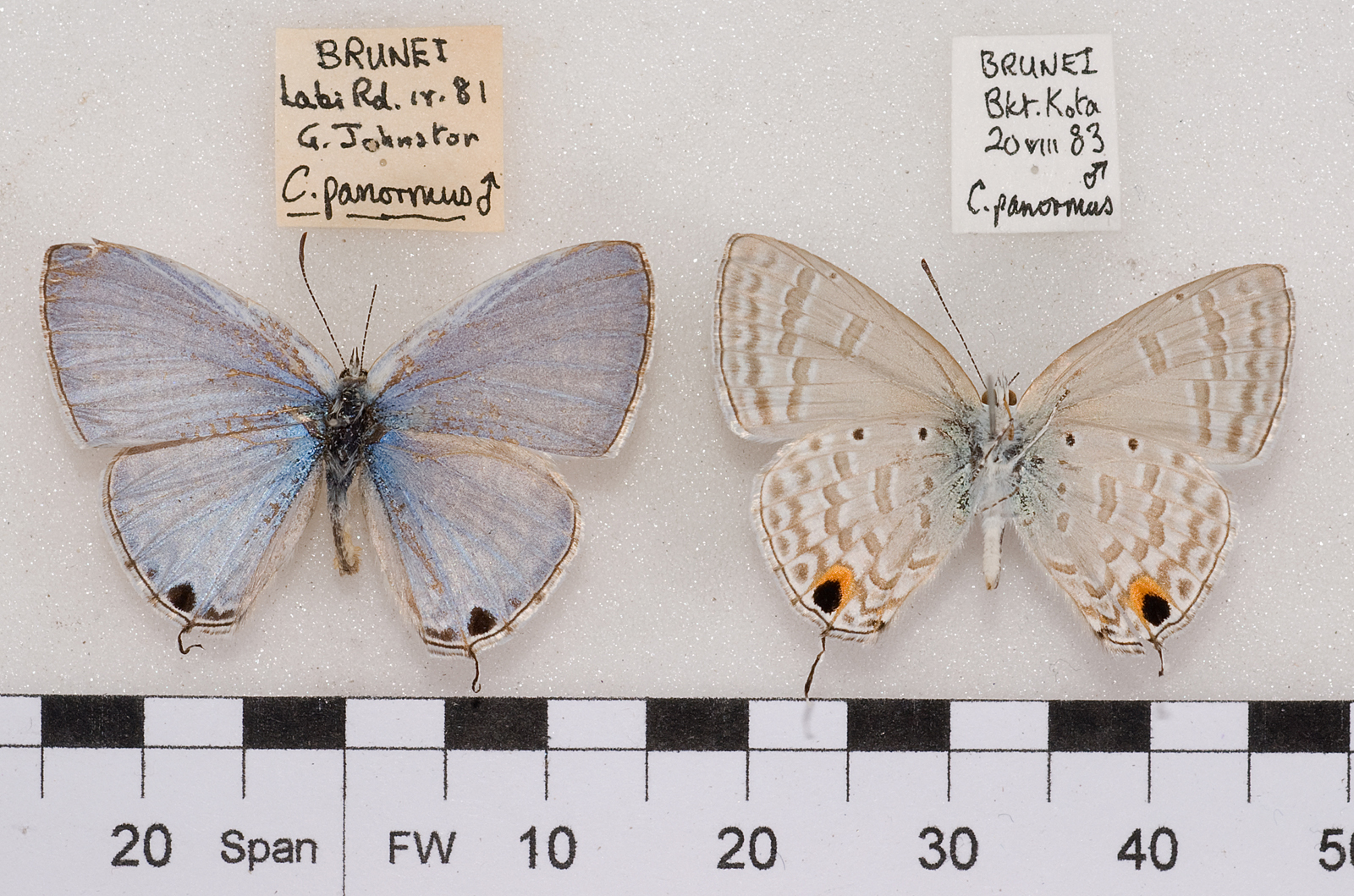

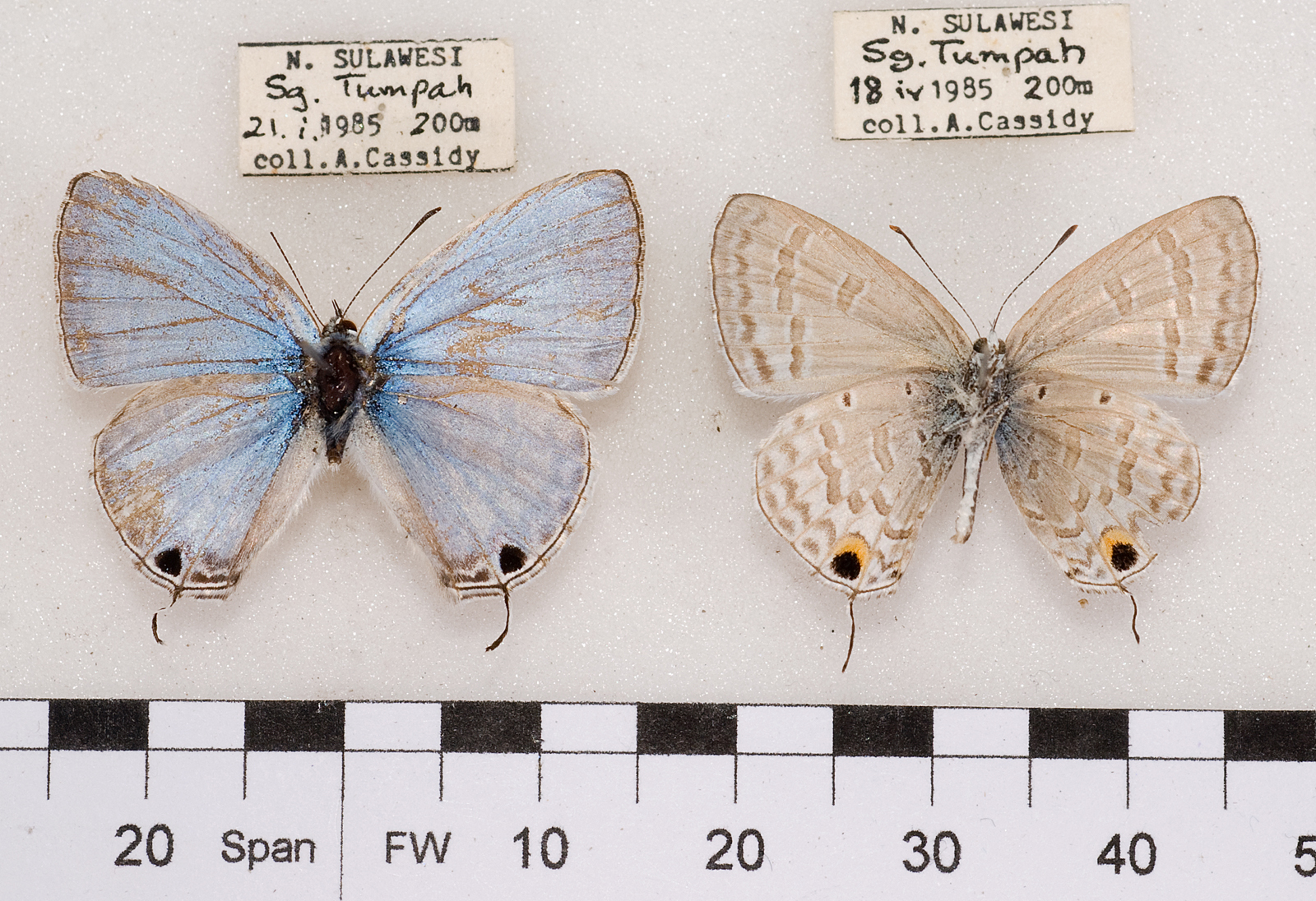

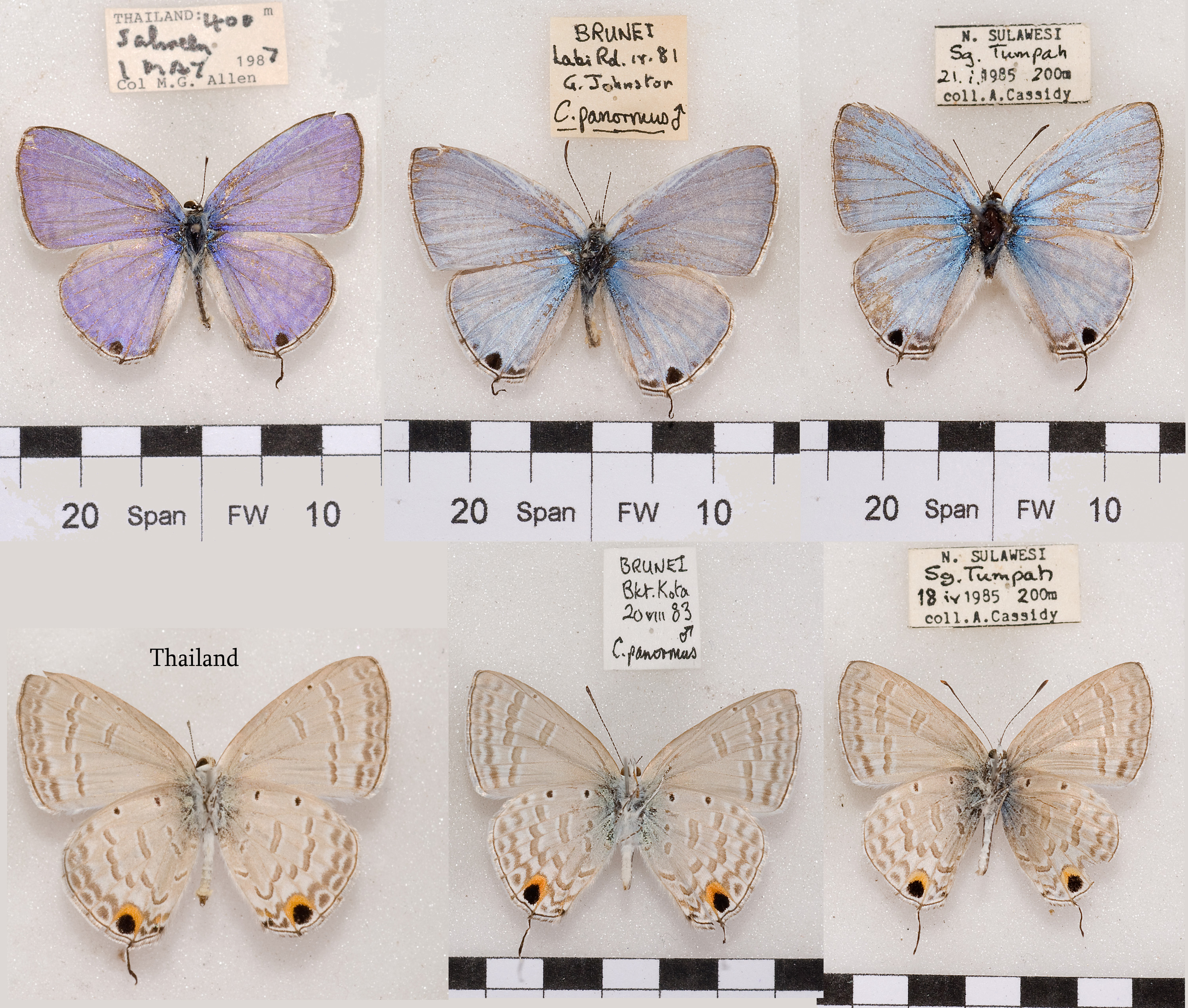

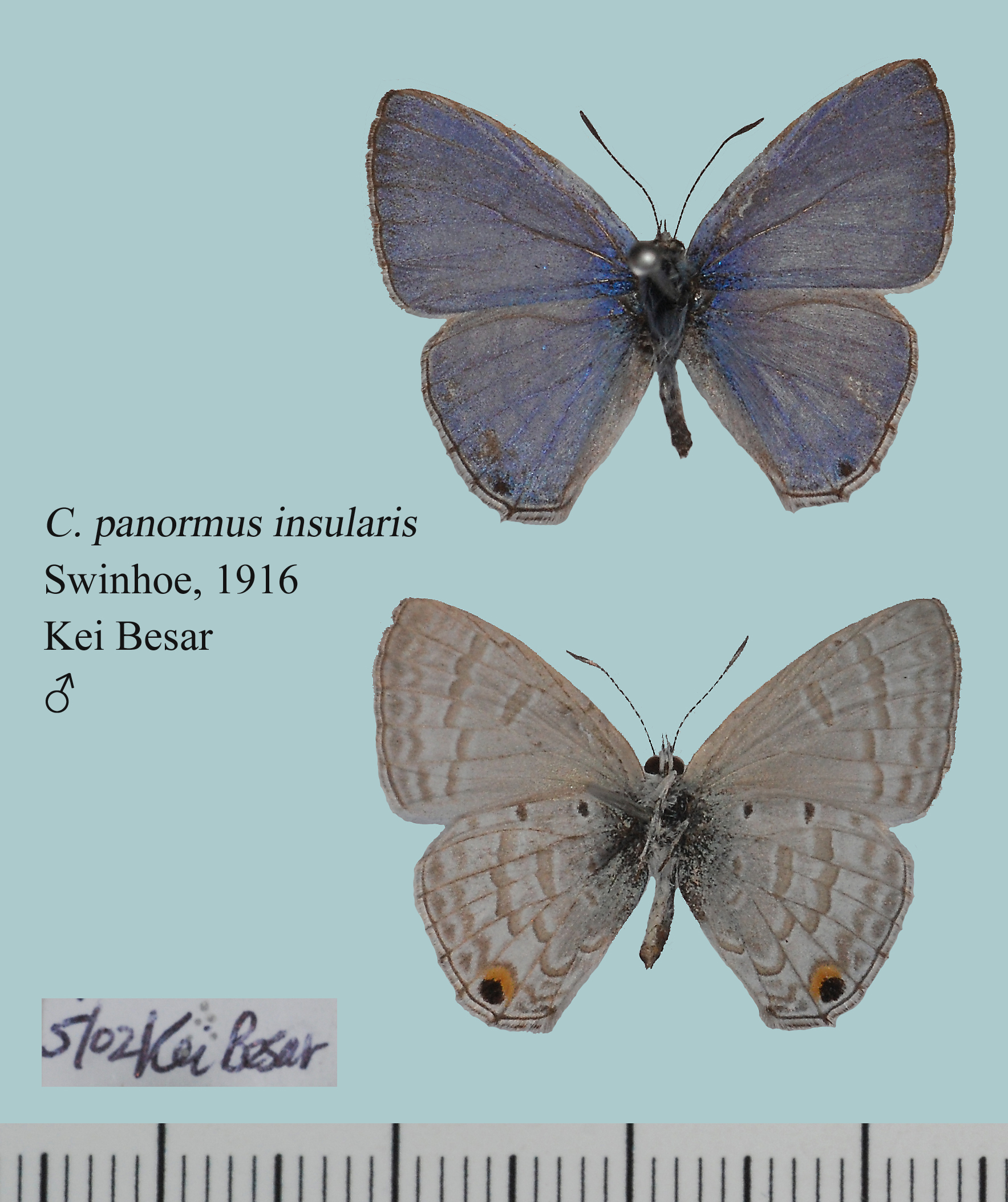

== See also ==
- List of butterflies of India
- List of butterflies of India (Lycaenidae)
