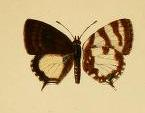

Scientific classification
- Domain: Eukaryota
- Kingdom: Animalia
- Phylum: Arthropoda
- Class: Insecta
- Order: Lepidoptera
- Family: Lycaenidae
- Genus: Callictita
- Species: C. cyara

Binomial name
- Callictita cyara Bethune-Baker, 1908

= Callictita cyara =

Species of butterfly

Callictita cyara is a species of butterfly of the family Lycaenidae. It is found in New Guinea.

== Subspecies ==
- Callictita cyara cyara (south-eastern New Guinea to Papua New Guinea)
- Callictita cyara cyabla Parsons, 1986 (New Guinea)
- Callictita cyara cyelsa Parsons, 1986 (New Guinea)
