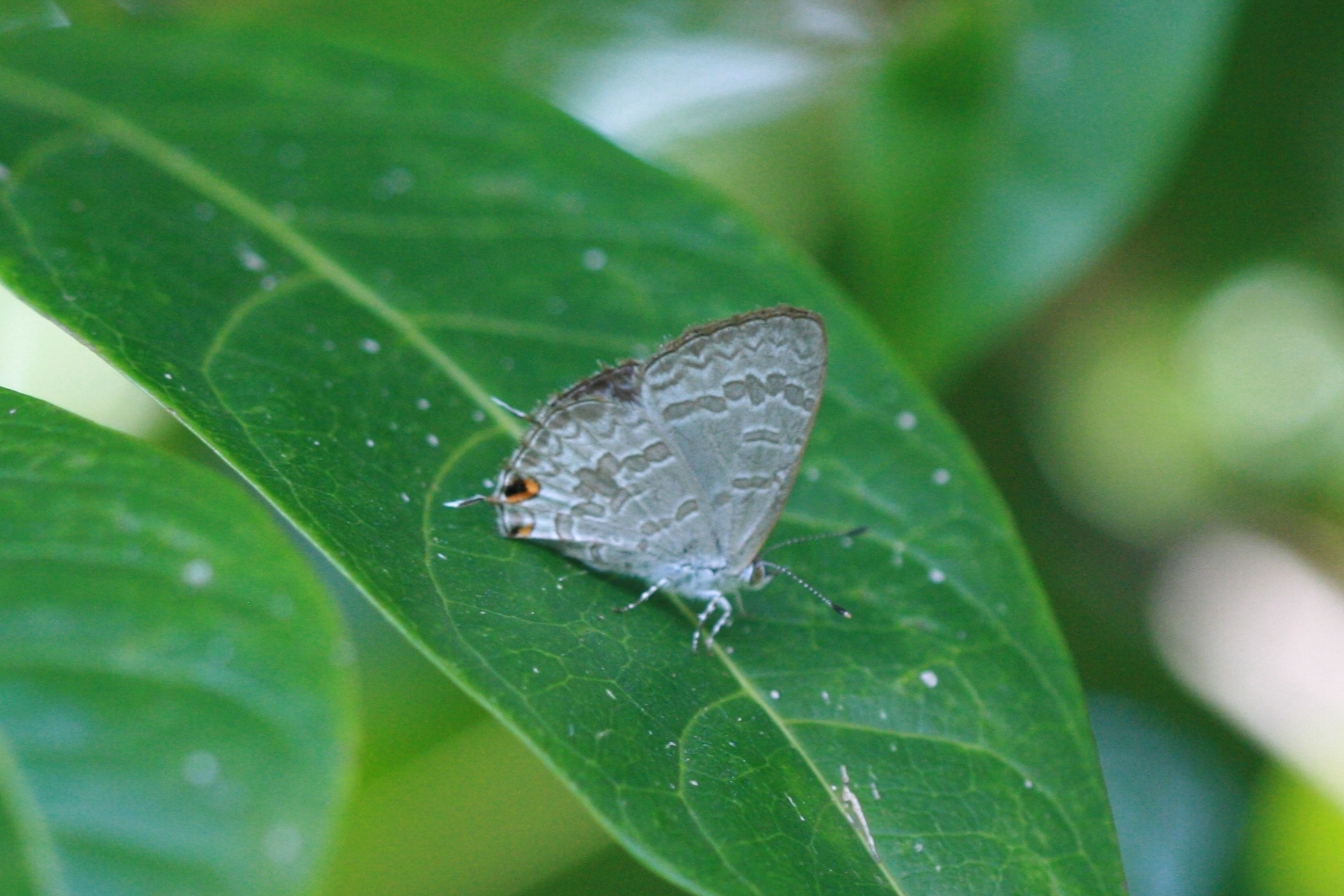

Scientific classification
- Domain: Eukaryota
- Kingdom: Animalia
- Phylum: Arthropoda
- Class: Insecta
- Order: Lepidoptera
- Family: Lycaenidae
- Genus: Catopyrops
- Species: C. florinda

Binomial name
- Catopyrops florinda (Butler, 1877)

= Catopyrops florinda =

Speckled line blue

Species of butterfly

Catopyrops florinda, the speckled line blue, is a species of butterfly belonging to the lycaenid family described by Arthur Gardiner Butler in 1877. It is found in the Australasian realm.

== Subspecies ==
- C. f. florinda Loyalty Islands
- C. f. estrella (Waterhouse & Lyell, 1914) Australia (Darwin, Northern Territory, Cooktown, Queensland and New South Wales)
- C. f. parva Tite, 1963 Timor, Kissar, Wetar, Letti

== Biology ==
The larva feeds on Celtis sinensis, Trema cannabina and Caesalpinia bonduc.
