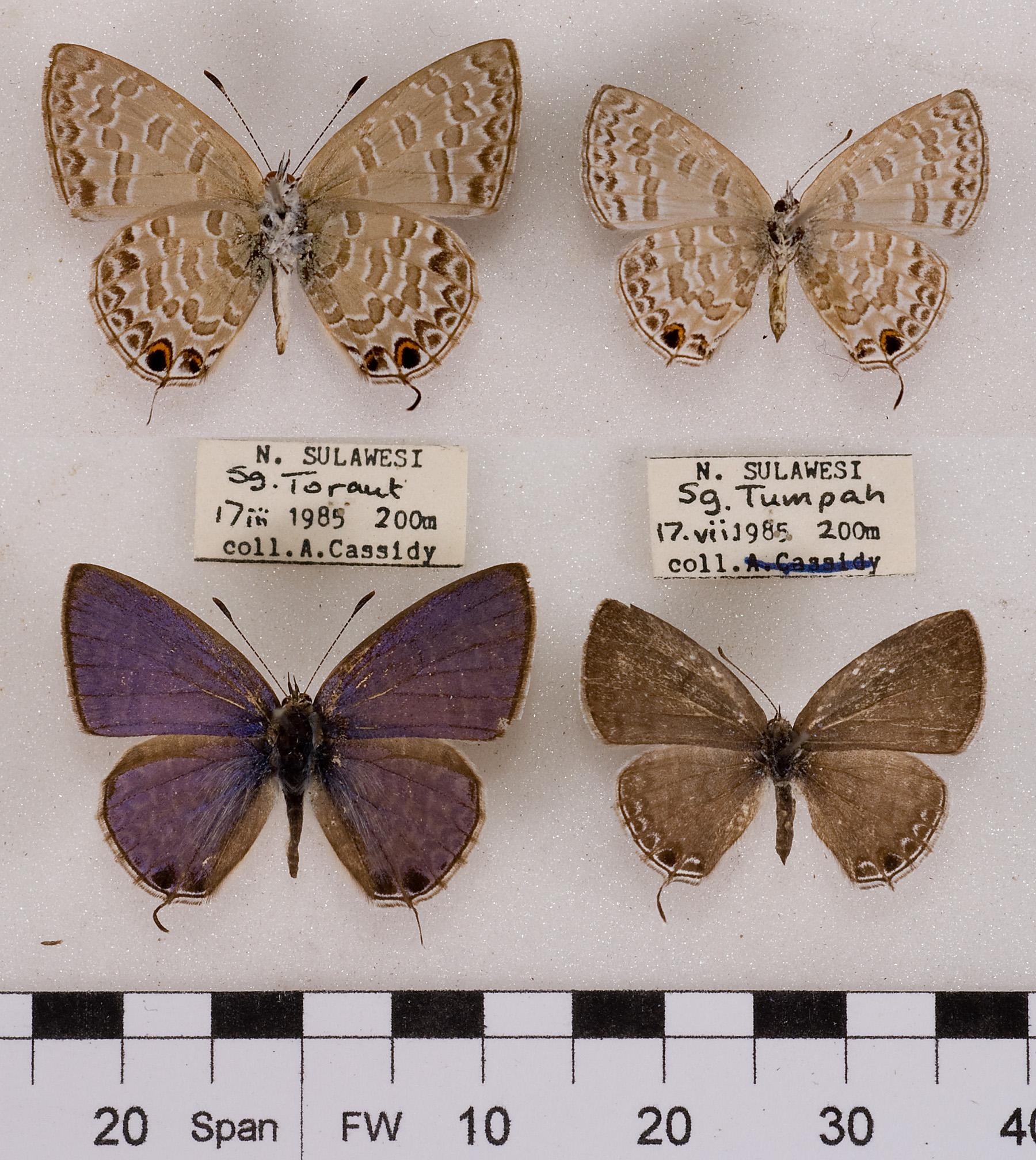

Scientific classification
- Domain: Eukaryota
- Kingdom: Animalia
- Phylum: Arthropoda
- Class: Insecta
- Order: Lepidoptera
- Family: Lycaenidae
- Genus: Catopyrops
- Species: C. ancyra

Binomial name
- Catopyrops ancyra (C. Felder, 1860)

Synonyms
- Lycaena ancyra Felder, 1860; Nacaduba ancyra mysia Waterhouse & Lyell, 1914; Nacaduba ancyra vanheurni van Eecke, 1924; Catopyrops ancyra duplicata Toxopeus, 1930; Plebeius subfestivus Röber, 1886; Lampides complicata Butler, 1882; Nacaduba amaura H. H. Druce, 1891; Nacaduba maniana H. H. Druce, 1891; Nacaduba ligamenta H. H. Druce, 1891; Nacaduba aberrans Elwes, [1893]; Cupido almora H. Druce, 1873; Nacaduba pseustis Doherty, 1891; Nacaduba ancyra hyperpseustis Toxopeus, 1929; Nacaduba ancyra exponens Fruhstorfer, 1916

= Catopyrops ancyra =

Felder's lineblue

Species of butterfly

Catopyrops ancyra, or Felder's lineblue, is a species of butterfly belonging to the lycaenid family described by Cajetan Felder in 1860. It is found in the Indomalayan and Australasian realms.

The larvae feed on Glochidion, Caesalpinia and Pipturus species.

== Subspecies ==
- Catopyrops ancyra ancyra (Ambon)
- Catopyrops ancyra mysia (Waterhouse & Lyell, 1914) (West Irian to Papua, Torres Strait Islands)
- Catopyrops ancyra subfestivus (Röber, 1886) (Sulawesi, Talaud, Sangihe, Tukangbesi, Banggai, Sula)
- Catopyrops ancyra tuala Toxopeus, 1930 (Kai)
- Catopyrops ancyra complicata (Butler, 1882) (Umboi, New Britain, Duke of York Island, New Irelan, New Hanover, Witu, Admiralty Islands)
- Catopyrops ancyra procella Tite, 1963 (Squally Island)
- Catopyrops ancyra distincta Tite, 1963 (Nissan Island)
- Catopyrops ancyra amaura (H. H. Druce, 1891) (Solomons: Alu, Roviana, Malaita)
- Catopyrops ancyra maniana (H. H. Druce, 1891) (Solomons: Ulava)
- Catopyrops ancyra ligamenta (H. H. Druce, 1891) (Solomons: Ugi)
- Catopyrops ancyra aberrans (Elwes, [1893]) (Assam, Myanmar to Peninsular Malaysia, possibly Sumatra)
- Catopyrops ancyra almora (H. Druce, 1873) (Borneo)
- Catopyrops ancyra hyperpseustis (Toxopeus, 1929) (Pulau Weh)
- Catopyrops ancyra exponens (Fruhstorfer, 1916) (Cocos Islands)
- Catopyrops ancyra nicevillei Toxopeus, 1930 (north-eastern Sumatra)
- Catopyrops ancyra austrojavana Toxopeus, 1930 (eastern Java)

== Description ==
Male upperside: plumbeous blue. Forewings and hindwings: anteciliary jet-black lines; on the hindwing subterminal subequal black spots in interspaces 1 and 2, beyond which there is a terminal white thread that does not extend beyond those two interspaces. Underside: French grey; principal markings chalky white, somewhat diffuse. Forewing: a pair of short transverse white lines across the middle and another pair at the apex of cell, one on each side of the discocellulars, these latter not extended to the apex but in most specimens indicated there by two white spots; a complete transverse catenulated discal band composed of two parallel white lines, beyond which the ground colour looks as if it had been chalked over; the terminal markings however, though blurred consist of an inner and an outer transverse series of white fannies succeeded by an anteciliary white line. Between, the transverse pairs of white lines, medial and discal, and between the subterminal series of lunules, the ground colour is distinctly darker, between the latter and the anteciliary line it takes the appearance of an incomplete transverse row of dark spots. Hindwing: the following transverse white, somewhat indistinct lines;— two basal, a single line on the inner side of the discocellulars, two irregular and discal, followed by double series of white lunules; a white anteciliary line and subterminal row of dark spots as on the forewing; subterminal black spots, broadly margined on the inner side with ochraceous orange in interspaces 1 and 2; tail black tipped with white. Antenna, head, thorax and abdomen dusky brown, the shafts of the antenna speckled with white; thorax and abdomen suffused with blue; beneath: palpi, thorax and abdomen white.

Female upperside: fuscous black. Forewing: posterior two-thirds pinkish brown shot with iridescent blue; a jet-black anteciliary line; cilia dark brown. Hindwing: basal three-fourths shot with a duller paler blue than on the forewing; very obscure postdiscal series of slender pale lunules, followed by the dark ground colour and beyond it by a subterminal series of slender lunules, those in the interspaces 1 and 2 ochraceous orange, the others white; a series of jet-black spots, a slender terminal white line and a conspicuous jet-black anteciliary line; cilia white alternated with dark brown at the apices of the veins. Underside: similar to that of the male, but the ground colour paler, the markings, especially the terminal markings, more clearly defined. Antennae, head, thorax and abdomen as in the male.

== Distribution ==
The hills of Assam, Myanmar and Tenasserim; the Nicobars.
