= Cupidesthes leonina =

Leonine ciliate blue

Scientific classification
- Domain: Eukaryota
- Kingdom: Animalia
- Phylum: Arthropoda
- Class: Insecta
- Order: Lepidoptera
- Family: Lycaenidae
- Genus: Cupidesthes
- Species: C. leonina

Binomial name
- Cupidesthes leonina (Bethune-Baker, 1903)

Synonyms
- Lycaenesthes leonina Bethune-Baker, 1903

Species of butterfly

Cupidesthes leonina, the leonine ciliate blue, is a butterfly in the family Lycaenidae. It is found in Sierra Leone, Ivory Coast, Ghana, Togo, Nigeria (the Cross River loop), Cameroon, Gabon, the Republic of the Congo, the Democratic Republic of the Congo (Sankuru and Lualaba), Uganda and Tanzania. The habitat consists of wet forests.

Adults of both sexes have been found on the flowers of Eupatorium species.
