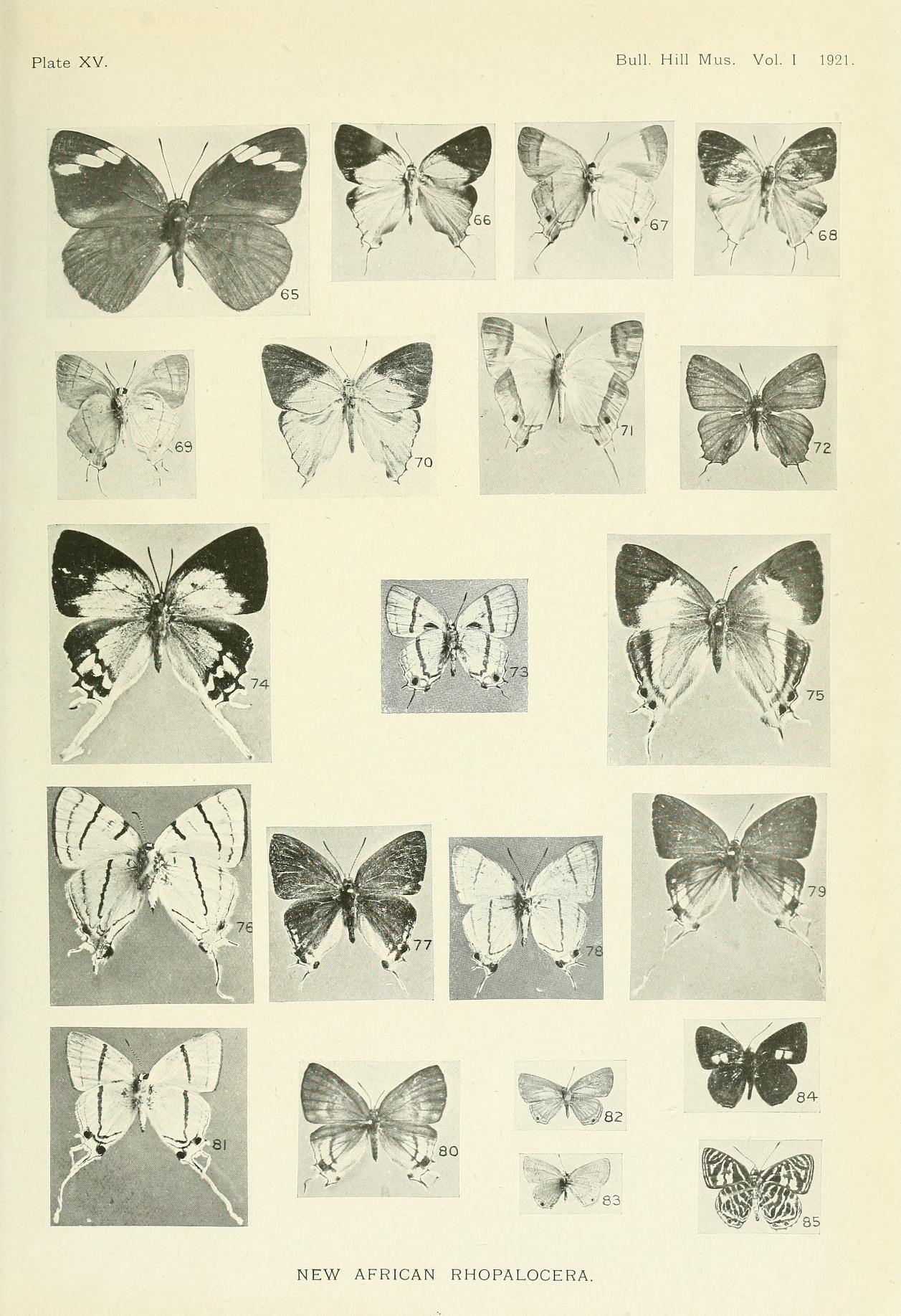
- Figs. 82 Cupidesthes minor female 83 female under

Scientific classification
- Domain: Eukaryota
- Kingdom: Animalia
- Phylum: Arthropoda
- Class: Insecta
- Order: Lepidoptera
- Family: Lycaenidae
- Genus: Cupidesthes
- Species: C. minor

Binomial name
- Cupidesthes minor Joicey & Talbot, 1921

= Cupidesthes minor =

Species of butterfly

Cupidesthes minor is a butterfly in the family Lycaenidae. It is found in Ituri Province in the Democratic Republic of the Congo.
