= Cupidesthes eliasi =

Scientific classification
- Domain: Eukaryota
- Kingdom: Animalia
- Phylum: Arthropoda
- Class: Insecta
- Order: Lepidoptera
- Family: Lycaenidae
- Genus: Cupidesthes
- Species: C. eliasi

Binomial name
- Cupidesthes eliasi Congdon, Kielland & Collins, 1998

Species of butterfly

Cupidesthes eliasi is a butterfly in the family Lycaenidae. It is found in Uganda and north-western Tanzania. The habitat consists of forests.
