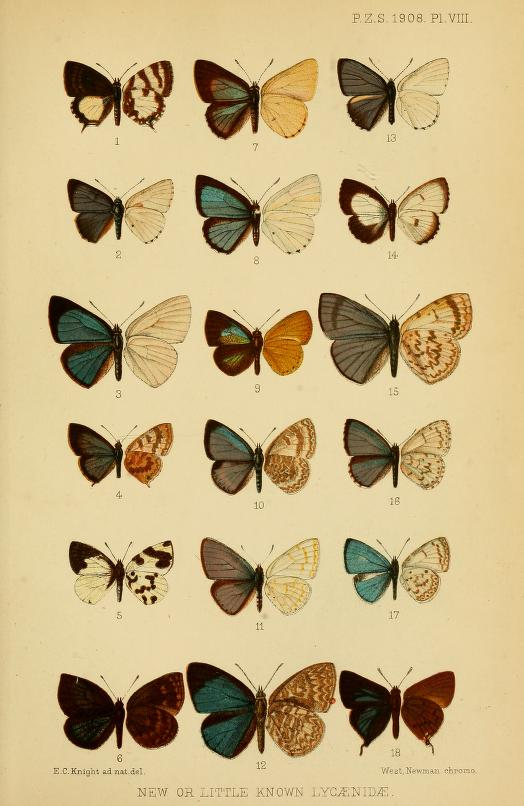
- Callictita cyara figure 1

Scientific classification
- Domain: Eukaryota
- Kingdom: Animalia
- Phylum: Arthropoda
- Class: Insecta
- Order: Lepidoptera
- Family: Lycaenidae
- Subfamily: Polyommatinae
- Tribe: Polyommatini
- Genus: Callictita; Bethune-Baker, 1908

= Callictita =

Butterfly genus in family Lycaenidae

Callictita is a genus of butterflies in the family Lycaenidae. The species of this genus are endemic to New Guinea (Australasian realm).

== Species ==
- The cyara species group
  - Callictita cyara Bethune-Baker, 1908
- The albiplaga species group
  - Callictita albiplaga (Joicey & Talbot, 1916) New Guinea
  - Callictita lara Parsons, 1986 New Guinea
- The mala species group
  - Callictita felgara Parsons, 1986 New Guinea
  - Callictita jola Parsons, 1986 New Guinea
  - Callictita mala Parsons, 1986 New Guinea
- The afrakiana species group
  - Callictita arfakiana Wind & Clench, 1947 New Guinea
  - Callictita tifala Parsons, 1986 New Guinea
- Unknown species group
  - Callictita upola Parsons & Hirowatari, 1988 New Guinea
