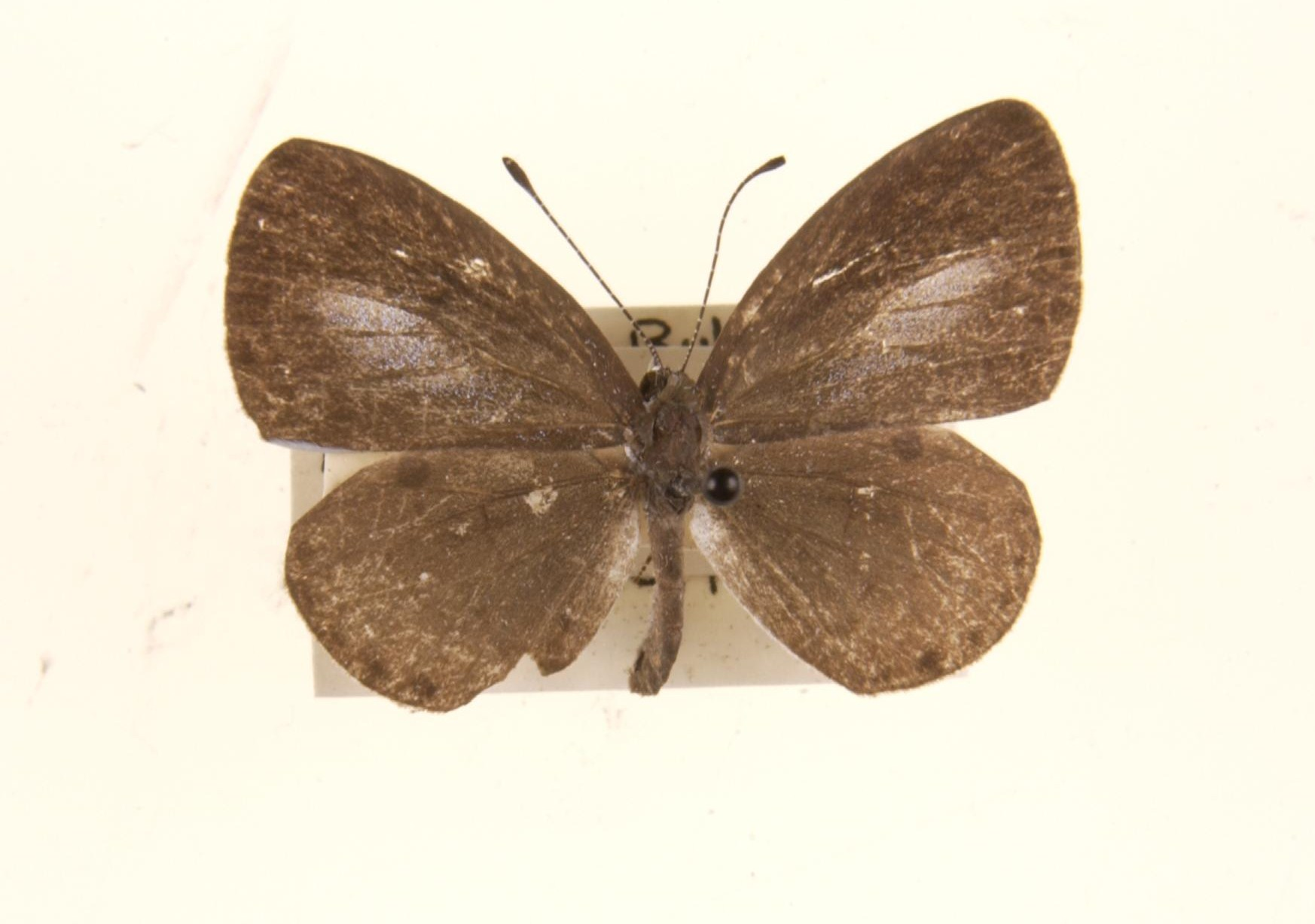
- Callenya melaena

Scientific classification
- Domain: Eukaryota
- Kingdom: Animalia
- Phylum: Arthropoda
- Class: Insecta
- Order: Lepidoptera
- Family: Lycaenidae
- Subfamily: Polyommatinae
- Tribe: Polyommatini
- Genus: Callenya; Eliot & Kawazoé, 1983

= Callenya =

Butterfly genus in family Lycaenidae

Callenya is an Indomalayan genus of butterflies in the family Lycaenidae.

== Species ==
- Callenya kaguya Eliot & Kawazoé, 1983 Palawan
- Callenya lenya (Evans, 1932)
- Callenya melaena (Doherty, 1889)
