= Cupidopsis =

- Cupidopsis cissus

Scientific classification
- Kingdom: Animalia
- Phylum: Arthropoda
- Clade: Pancrustacea
- Class: Insecta
- Order: Lepidoptera
- Family: Lycaenidae
- Subfamily: Polyommatinae
- Tribe: Polyommatini
- Genus: Cupidopsis; Karsch, 1895

Butterfly genus in family Lycaenidae

Cupidopsis is a genus of Afrotropical butterflies in the family Lycaenidae.

== Species ==
- Cupidopsis cissus (Godart, [1824])
- Cupidopsis iobates (Hopffer, 1855)
