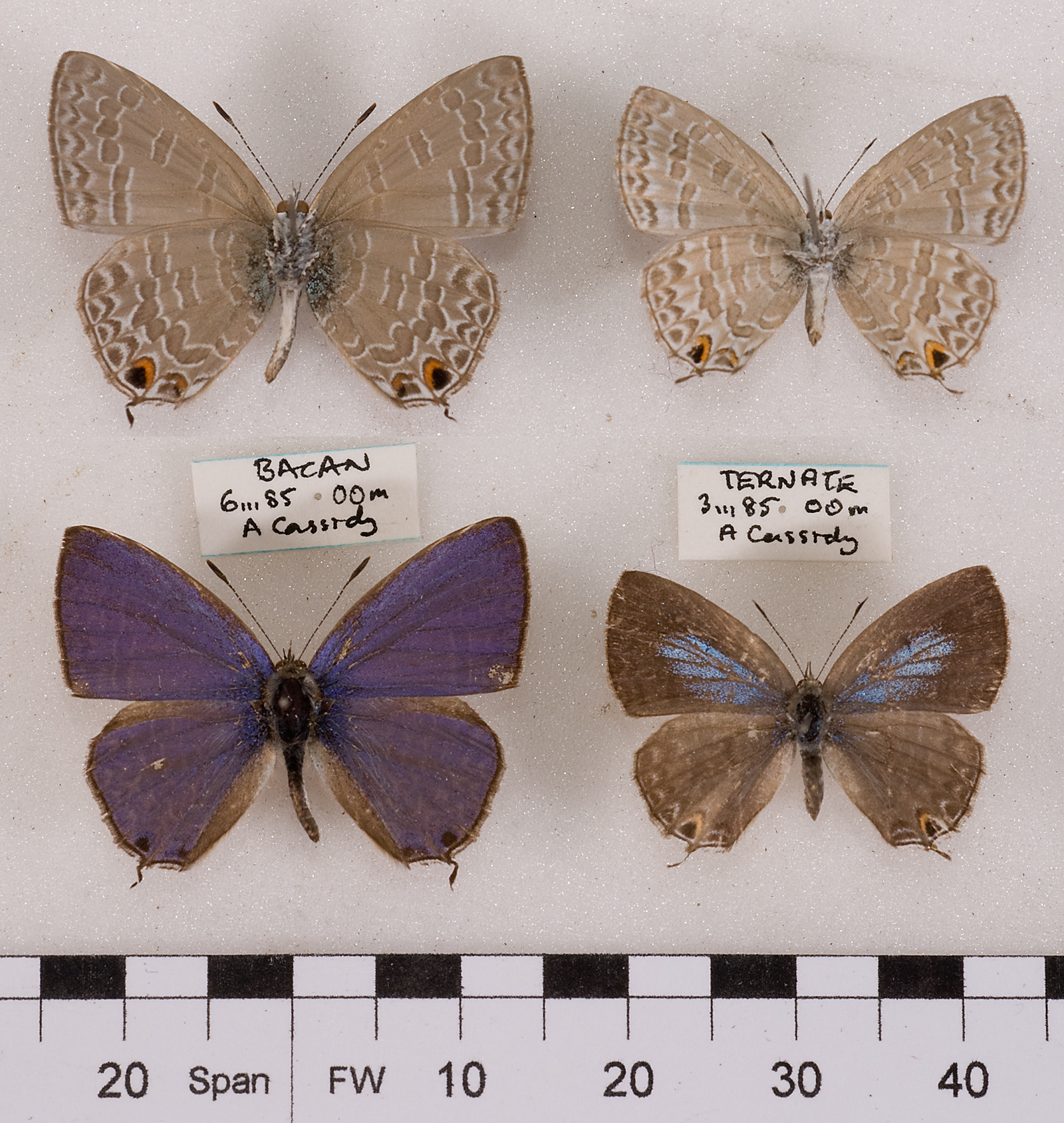
- Catopyrops ancyra

Scientific classification
- Kingdom: Animalia
- Phylum: Arthropoda
- Clade: Pancrustacea
- Class: Insecta
- Order: Lepidoptera
- Family: Lycaenidae
- Subfamily: Polyommatinae
- Tribe: Polyommatini
- Genus: Catopyrops; Toxopeus, 1929

= Catopyrops =

Genus of butterflies

Catopyrops is a genus of butterflies in the family Lycaenidae. The range extends from India to the Malay Archipelago and the Solomon Islands.

== Species ==
- Catopyrops ancyra (Felder, 1860) – many subspecies
- Catopyrops florinda (Butler, 1877)
- Catopyrops holtra Parsons, 1986 New Britain
- Catopyrops keiria (Druce, 1891)
- Catopyrops kokopona (Ribbe, 1899)
- Catopyrops nebulosa (Druce, 1892) New Hebrides
- Catopyrops rita (Grose-Smith, 1895)
- Catopyrops zyx Parsons, 1986 Solomon Islands, New Guinea
