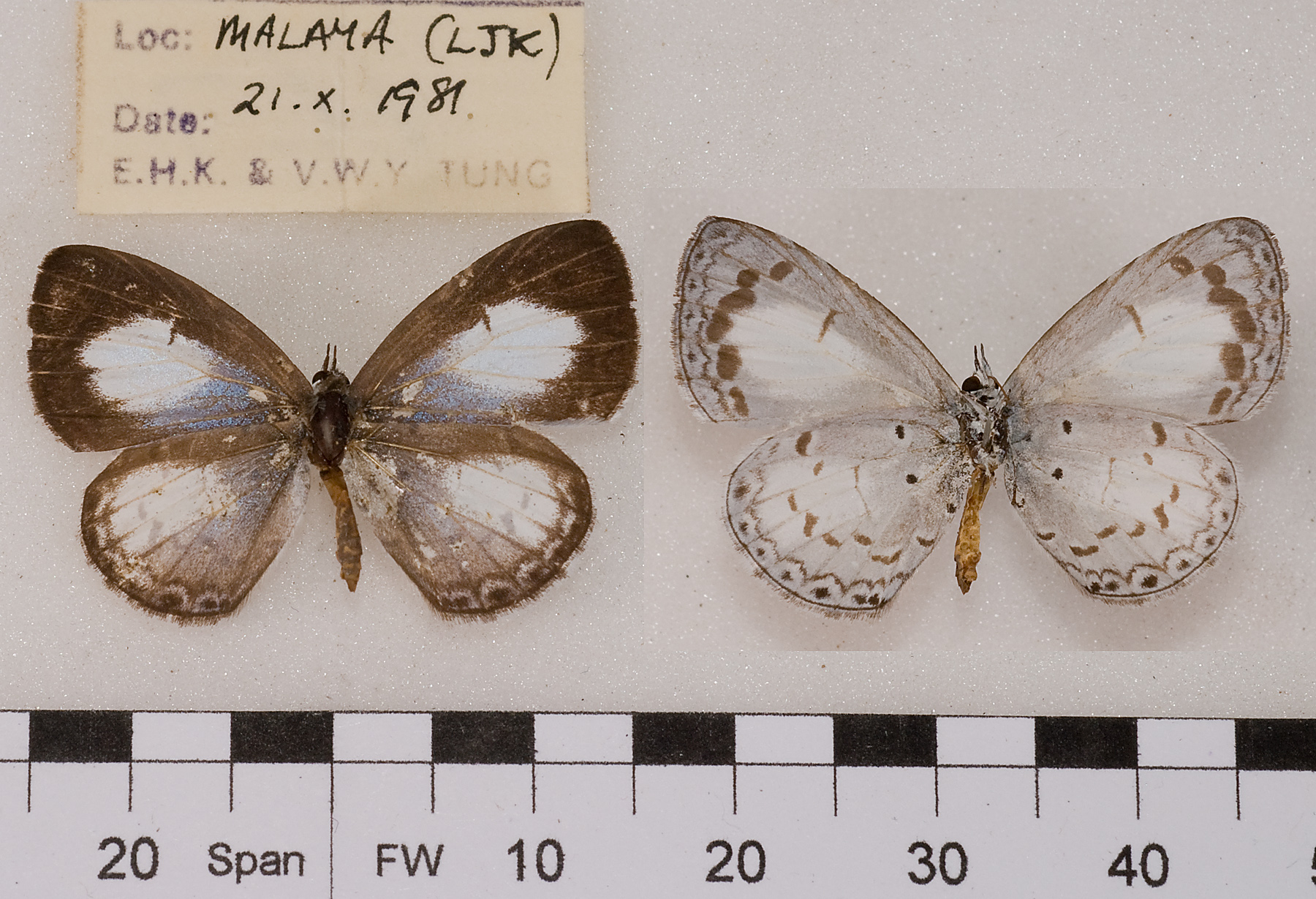
- Celatoxia marginata

Scientific classification
- Domain: Eukaryota
- Kingdom: Animalia
- Phylum: Arthropoda
- Class: Insecta
- Order: Lepidoptera
- Family: Lycaenidae
- Subfamily: Polyommatinae
- Tribe: Polyommatini
- Genus: Celatoxia; Eliot & Kawazoé, 1983

= Celatoxia =

Genus of butterflies

Celatoxia is a genus of butterflies in the family Lycaenidae. The species of this genus are found in the Indomalayan realm and the Palearctic realm (Yunnan, Himalayas).

== Species ==
- Celatoxia albidisca (Moore, 1884) South India (highlands)
- Celatoxia carna (de Nicéville, 1895) Assam to Malaya, Sumatra
- Celatoxia marginata (de Nicéville, 1884) Kumaon, Assam, Himalayas to Burma, North Thailand, Laos, North Vietnam, Yunnan, Formosa Peninsular Malaya
