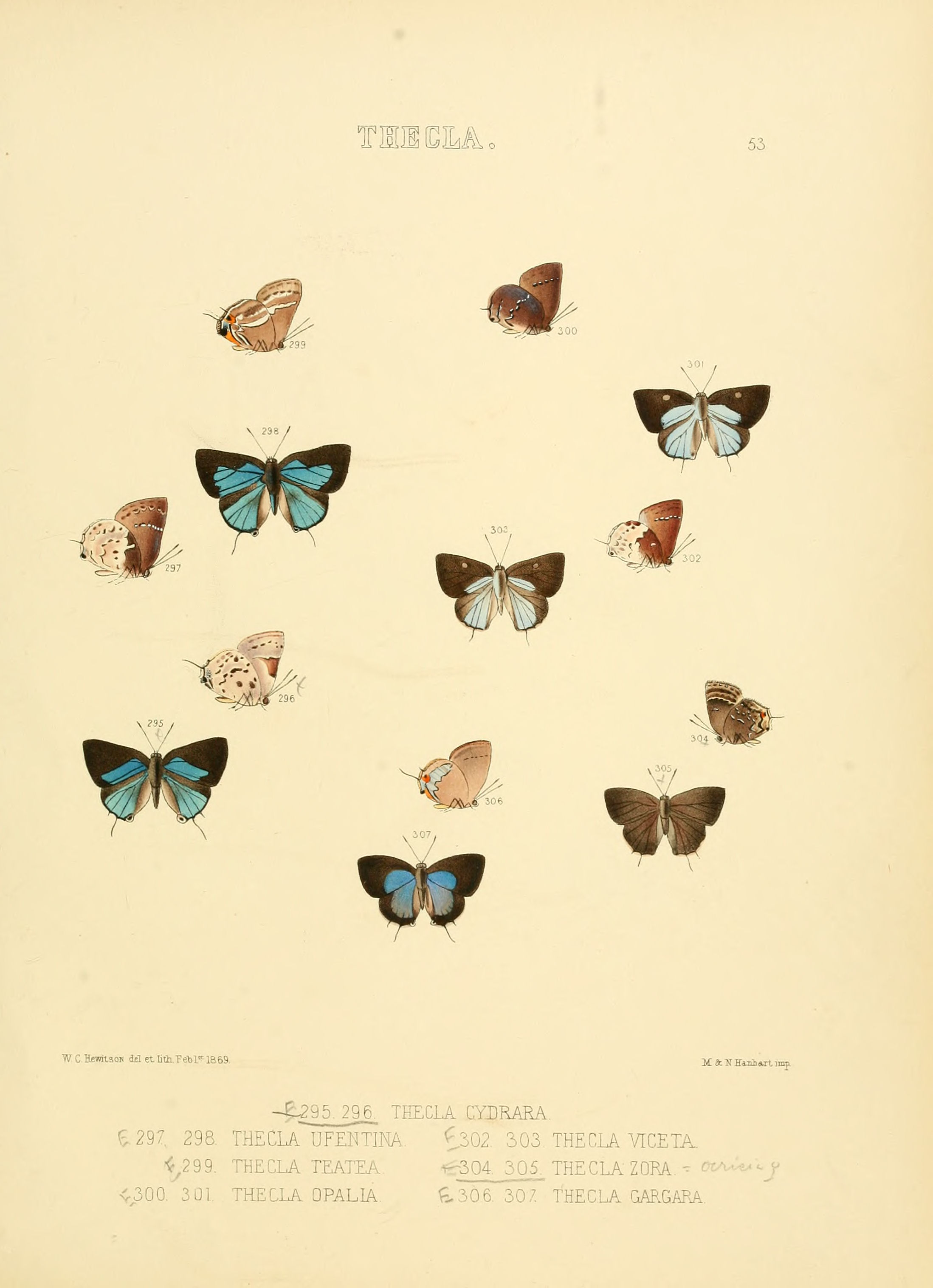
- Nicolaea opalia and Nicolaea viceta in William Chapman Hewitson's Illustrations of Diurnal Lepidoptera

Scientific classification
- Domain: Eukaryota
- Kingdom: Animalia
- Phylum: Arthropoda
- Class: Insecta
- Order: Lepidoptera
- Family: Lycaenidae
- Tribe: Eumaeini
- Genus: Nicolaea; Johnson, 1993

Synonyms
- Crimsinota Johnson, 1993; Rindgea Johnson, 1993

= Nicolaea =

Butterfly genus in family Lycaenidae

Nicolaea is a Neotropical genus of butterfly in the family Lycaenidae.

== Species ==
- Nicolaea cauter (Druce, 1907)
- Nicolaea schausa (E. D. Jones, 1912)
- Nicolaea dolium (Druce, 1907)
- Nicolaea ceglusa (Hewitson, 1868)
- Nicolaea bagrada (Hewitson, 1868)
- Nicolaea xorema (Schaus, 1902)
- Nicolaea fabulla (Hewitson, 1868)
- Nicolaea demilineata (Lathy, 1936)
- Nicolaea obelus (Druce, 1907)
- Nicolaea castinotus (Johnson & Le Crom, 1997)
- Nicolaea cupa (Druce, 1907)
- Nicolaea petilla (Hewitson, 1868)
- Nicolaea velina (Hewitson, 1868)
- Nicolaea torris (Druce, 1907)
- Nicolaea besidia (Hewitson, 1868)
- Nicolaea socia (Hewitson, 1868)
- Nicolaea viceta (Hewitson, 1868)
- Nicolaea opalia (Hewitson, 1868)
- Nicolaea opaliana (Hayward, 1967)
- Nicolaea ophia (Hewitson, 1868)
- Nicolaea heraldica (Dyar, 1914)
- Nicolaea pyxis (Johnson, 1993)
- Nicolaea umuarama (Johnson, 1993)
- Nicolaea laconia (Hewitson, 1868)
- Nicolaea lemuria (Hewitson, 1868)
- Nicolaea munditia (Druce, 1907)
