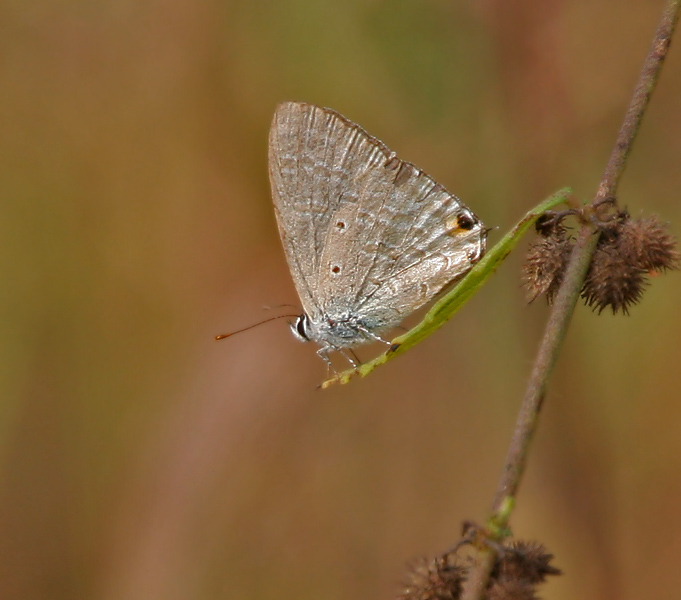
- Catochrysops strabo in Kawal Wildlife Sanctuary, India

Scientific classification
- Domain: Eukaryota
- Kingdom: Animalia
- Phylum: Arthropoda
- Class: Insecta
- Order: Lepidoptera
- Family: Lycaenidae
- Subfamily: Polyommatinae
- Tribe: Polyommatini
- Genus: Catochrysops; Boisduval, 1832

= Catochrysops =

Genus of butterflies

Catochrysops is a genus of butterflies in the family Lycaenidae. The species of this genus are found in the Indomalayan and the Australasian realms.

== Species ==
Listed alphabetically:

- Catochrysops amasea Waterhouse & Lyell, 1914 Torres Strait Island, Rennell Island
- Catochrysops lithargyria (Moore, 1877)
- Catochrysops nubila Tite, 1959 Solomon Islands (Bougainville, Santa Isabel)
- Catochrysops panormus (C. Felder, 1860)
- Catochrysops strabo (Fabricius, 1793)
- Catochrysops strabobinna Swinhoe, 1916 Lesser Sunda Islands, Celebes, Talaud, Tukangbesi, Sula, Maluku
- Catochrysops taitensis (Boisduval, 1832) Fiji, New Hebrides

In some classifications, Catochrysops also includes Rysops as a monotypic subgenus.
