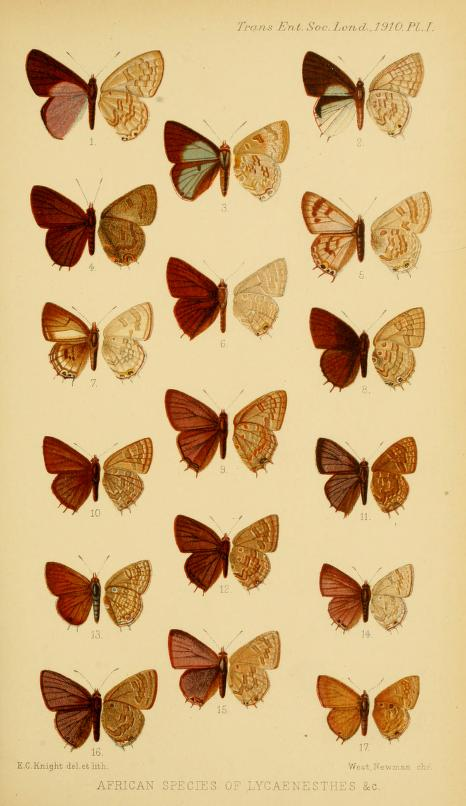
- Figure 1 Cupidesthes lithas Figure 2 Cupidesthes arescopa Figure 3 Cupidesthes robusta

Scientific classification
- Domain: Eukaryota
- Kingdom: Animalia
- Phylum: Arthropoda
- Class: Insecta
- Order: Lepidoptera
- Family: Lycaenidae
- Tribe: Lycaenesthini
- Genus: Cupidesthes; Aurivillius, 1895

= Cupidesthes =

Butterfly genus in family Lycaenidae

Cupidesthes is a genus of butterflies in the family Lycaenidae. The species of this genus are found in the Afrotropical realm. The genus Cupidesthes was erected by Per Olof Christopher Aurivillius in 1895.

== Species ==
- Cupidesthes albida (Aurivillius, 1923)
- Cupidesthes arescopa Bethune-Baker, 1910
- Cupidesthes caerulea Jackson, 1966
- Cupidesthes cuprifascia Joicey & Talbot, 1921
- Cupidesthes eliasi Congdon, Kielland & Collins, 1998
- Cupidesthes jacksoni Stempffer, 1969
- Cupidesthes leonina (Bethune-Baker, 1903)
- Cupidesthes lithas (Druce, 1890)
- Cupidesthes mimetica (Druce, 1910)
- Cupidesthes minor Joicey & Talbot, 1921
- Cupidesthes paludicola (Holland, 1891)
- Cupidesthes paralithas Bethune-Baker, 1926
- Cupidesthes pungusei Collins & Larsen, 2005
- Cupidesthes robusta Aurivillius, 1895
- Cupidesthes salvatoris Belcastro & Larsen, 2005
- Cupidesthes thyrsis (Kirby, 1878)
- Cupidesthes vidua Talbot, 1929
- Cupidesthes ysobelae Jackson, 1966
