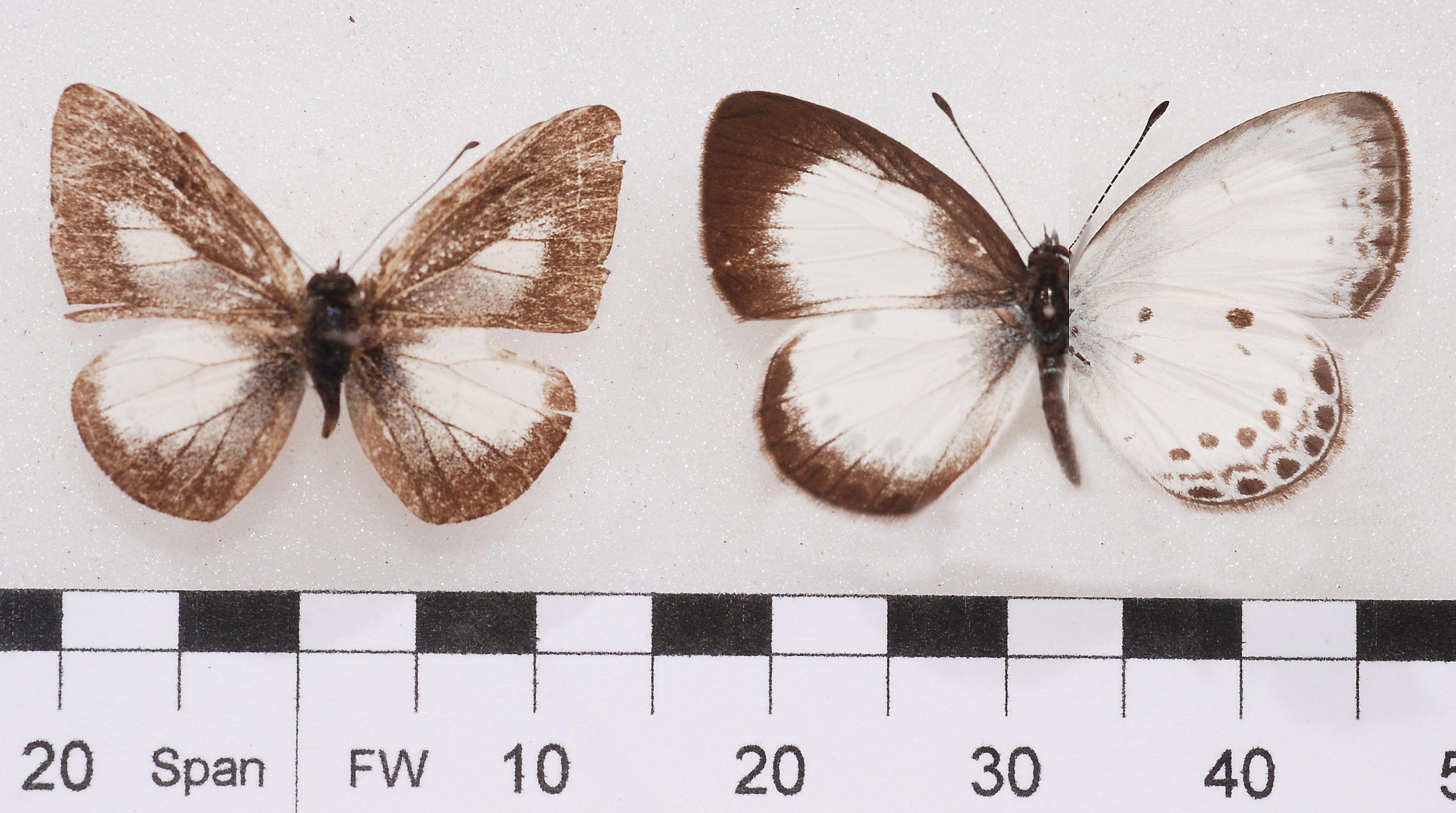
- Cebrella lingga hollowayi

Scientific classification
- Domain: Eukaryota
- Kingdom: Animalia
- Phylum: Arthropoda
- Class: Insecta
- Order: Lepidoptera
- Family: Lycaenidae
- Subfamily: Polyommatinae
- Tribe: Polyommatini
- Genus: Cebrella; Eliot & Kawazoé, 1983

= Cebrella =

Butterfly genus in family Lycaenidae

Cebrella is a genus of butterflies in the family Lycaenidae. The genus was erected by John Nevill Eliot and Akito Kawazoe in 1983.

== Species ==
Subgenus Cebrella

- Cebrella pellecebra (Frühstorfer, 1910) Thailand, Malay Peninsula, Sumatra
- Cebrella penelope Eliot & Kawazoé, 1983 Philippines (Mindanao)

Subgenus Chelakina Eliot & Kawazoé, 1984

- Cebrella malanga (Chapman, 1911) Borneo
- Cebrella nigerrima (Moulton, 1911) Borneo, Pahang
- Cebrella lingga (Moulton, 1912) Sarawak
