= Tetrarhanis onitshae =

Scientific classification
- Kingdom: Animalia
- Phylum: Arthropoda
- Class: Insecta
- Order: Lepidoptera
- Family: Lycaenidae
- Genus: Tetrarhanis
- Species: T. onitshae

Binomial name
- Tetrarhanis onitshae (Stempffer, 1962)

Synonyms
- Liptena (Tetrarhanis) onitshae Stempffer, 1962

Species of butterfly

Tetrarhanis onitshae, the Onitsha on-off, is a butterfly in the family Lycaenidae. It is found in eastern Nigeria. The habitat consists of primary forests.
