= Eresina katangana =

Scientific classification
- Domain: Eukaryota
- Kingdom: Animalia
- Phylum: Arthropoda
- Class: Insecta
- Order: Lepidoptera
- Family: Lycaenidae
- Genus: Eresina
- Species: E. katangana

Binomial name
- Eresina katangana Stempffer, 1956

Species of butterfly

Eresina katangana is a butterfly in the family Lycaenidae. It is found in the Democratic Republic of the Congo (Lualaba) and Zambia. Its habitat consists of dense, primary forests.
