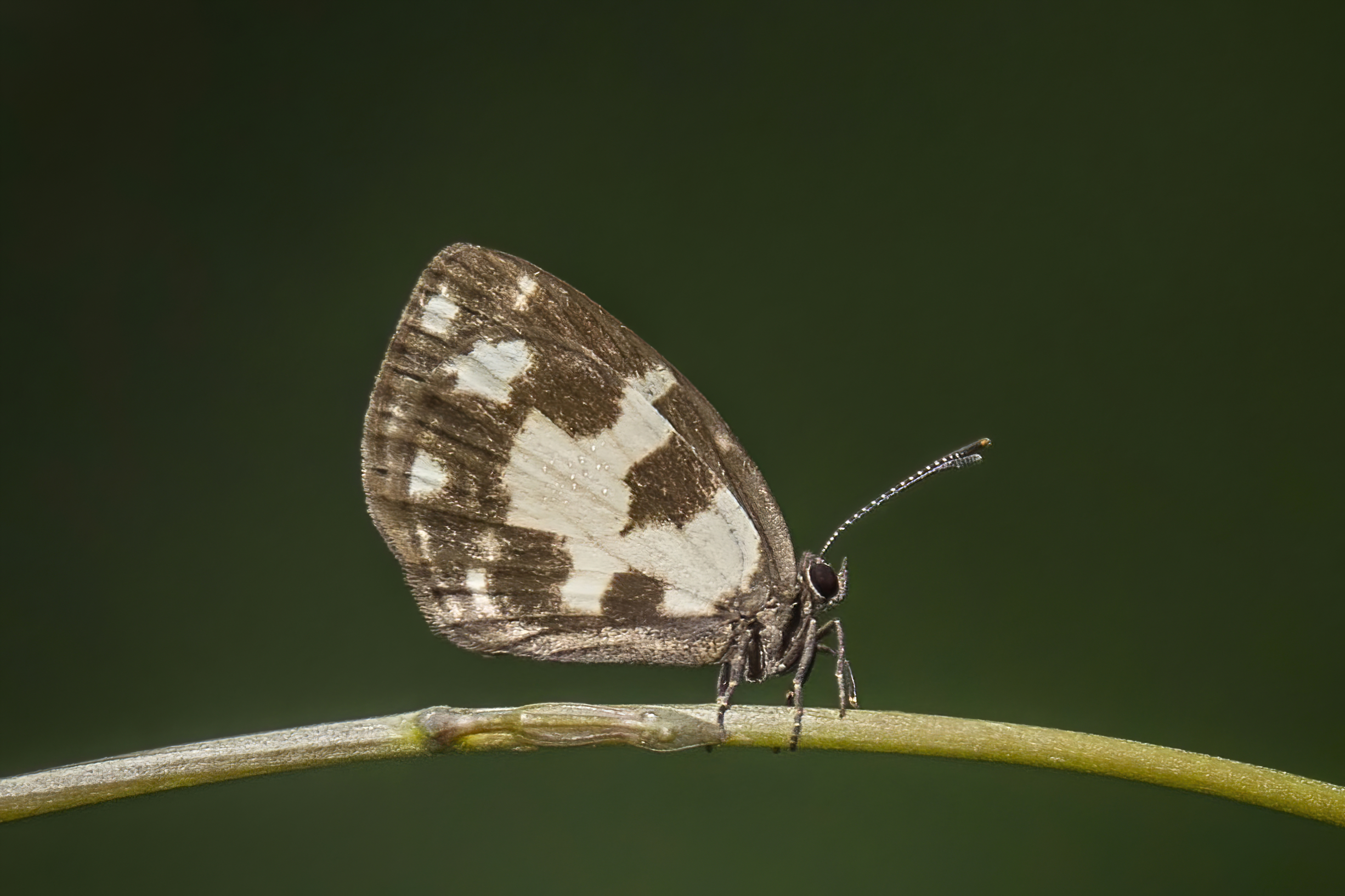
- In Ghana

Scientific classification
- Kingdom: Animalia
- Phylum: Arthropoda
- Clade: Pancrustacea
- Class: Insecta
- Order: Lepidoptera
- Family: Lycaenidae
- Genus: Falcuna
- Species: F. leonensis

Binomial name
- Falcuna leonensis Stempffer & Bennett, 1963

= Falcuna leonensis =

Species of butterfly

Falcuna leonensis, the western marble, is a butterfly in the family Lycaenidae. It is found in Guinea, Sierra Leone, Liberia, Ivory Coast and Ghana. The habitat consists of primary and secondary forests.

Torben Larsen developed a species numbering system for his 2005 publication Butterflies of West Africa. This species is #249. The 'Larsen' numbers have since been used with permission in A Sharp Eye on Butterflies of Ghana.
