= Eresina likouala =

Scientific classification
- Domain: Eukaryota
- Kingdom: Animalia
- Phylum: Arthropoda
- Class: Insecta
- Order: Lepidoptera
- Family: Lycaenidae
- Genus: Eresina
- Species: E. likouala

Binomial name
- Eresina likouala Stempffer, 1962

Species of butterfly

Eresina likouala is a butterfly in the family Lycaenidae. It is found in the Republic of the Congo. Its habitat consists of dense, primary forests.
