= Eresina rougeoti =

Scientific classification
- Domain: Eukaryota
- Kingdom: Animalia
- Phylum: Arthropoda
- Class: Insecta
- Order: Lepidoptera
- Family: Lycaenidae
- Genus: Eresina
- Species: E. rougeoti

Binomial name
- Eresina rougeoti Stempffer, 1956

Species of butterfly

Eresina rougeoti, the Rougeot's eresina, is a butterfly in the family Lycaenidae. It is found in Sierra Leone, Ivory Coast, Nigeria, Cameroon, Bioko, Gabon, the Republic of the Congo, the Democratic Republic of the Congo (Kinshasa), Uganda and north-western Tanzania. Its habitat consists of dense, primary forests.
