= Eresina saundersi =

Scientific classification
- Kingdom: Animalia
- Phylum: Arthropoda
- Clade: Pancrustacea
- Class: Insecta
- Order: Lepidoptera
- Family: Lycaenidae
- Genus: Eresina
- Species: E. saundersi

Binomial name
- Eresina saundersi Stempffer, 1956

Species of butterfly

Eresina saundersi, the Saunders' eresina, is a butterfly in the family Lycaenidae. It is found in Ivory Coast, Ghana and western Nigeria. Its habitat consists of dense, primary forests.

Torben Larsen developed a species numbering system for his 2005 publication Butterflies of West Africa. This species is #210. The 'Larsen' numbers have since been used with permission in A Sharp Eye on Butterflies of Ghana.
