= Falcuna kasai =

Scientific classification
- Kingdom: Animalia
- Phylum: Arthropoda
- Class: Insecta
- Order: Lepidoptera
- Family: Lycaenidae
- Genus: Falcuna
- Species: F. kasai

Binomial name
- Falcuna kasai Stempffer & Bennett, 1963

Species of butterfly

Falcuna kasai is a butterfly in the family Lycaenidae. It is found in the Democratic Republic of the Congo (Ituri, North Kivu, Sankuru, Kasai and Lulua). The habitat consists of primary forests.
