= Micropentila fontainei =

Scientific classification
- Domain: Eukaryota
- Kingdom: Animalia
- Phylum: Arthropoda
- Class: Insecta
- Order: Lepidoptera
- Family: Lycaenidae
- Genus: Micropentila
- Species: M. fontainei

Binomial name
- Micropentila fontainei Stempffer & Bennett, 1965

Species of butterfly

Micropentila fontainei is a butterfly in the family Lycaenidae. It is found in the Democratic Republic of the Congo (Équateur and Sankuru) and Uganda (from the west to the Bwamba Valley). The habitat consists of primary forests.
