= Oxylides albata =

Scientific classification
- Kingdom: Animalia
- Phylum: Arthropoda
- Clade: Pancrustacea
- Class: Insecta
- Order: Lepidoptera
- Family: Lycaenidae
- Genus: Oxylides
- Species: O. albata

Binomial name
- Oxylides albata (Aurivillius, 1895)

Synonyms
- Hypolycaena faunus var. albata Aurivillius, 1895

Species of butterfly

Oxylides albata, Aurivillius' common false head, is a butterfly in the family Lycaenidae. It is found in Nigeria (the Cross River Loop), Cameroon, the Republic of the Congo, the Central African Republic, the Democratic Republic of the Congo (Mongala, Uele, Tshopo, Ituri and Equateur), western Uganda and Rwanda.

== Description ==
Seitz Fauna Africana Taf 67

albata Auriv. ( = feminina E. Sharpe [not a synonym = Oxylides feminina Sharpe, 1904)] (67 a) only deviates [from Oxylides faunus ] by the hindwing above being at the proximal margin at least in la white or greyish-white, and at the anal angle much broader white; in the female the white marginal band in area is at least 4 mm broad, and reaches anteriorly to vein 6. Congo District and Uganda.

== Images ==
External images from Royal Museum of Central Africa.

== Biology ==
The habitat consists of forests.
