= Eresina bergeri =

Scientific classification
- Domain: Eukaryota
- Kingdom: Animalia
- Phylum: Arthropoda
- Class: Insecta
- Order: Lepidoptera
- Family: Lycaenidae
- Genus: Eresina
- Species: E. bergeri

Binomial name
- Eresina bergeri Stempffer, 1956

Species of butterfly

Eresina bergeri is a butterfly in the family Lycaenidae. It is found in the Democratic Republic of the Congo (Lualaba), Uganda, north-western Tanzania and possibly the Republic of the Congo. Its habitat consists of dense, primary forests.
