= Micropentila katangana =

Scientific classification
- Kingdom: Animalia
- Phylum: Arthropoda
- Class: Insecta
- Order: Lepidoptera
- Family: Lycaenidae
- Genus: Micropentila
- Species: M. katangana

Binomial name
- Micropentila katangana Stempffer & Bennett, 1965

Species of butterfly

Micropentila katangana is a butterfly in the family Lycaenidae. It is found in the Democratic Republic of the Congo (Katanga). The habitat consists of primary forests.
