= Eresina jacksoni =

Scientific classification
- Kingdom: Animalia
- Phylum: Arthropoda
- Class: Insecta
- Order: Lepidoptera
- Family: Lycaenidae
- Genus: Eresina
- Species: E. jacksoni

Binomial name
- Eresina jacksoni Stempffer, 1961

Species of butterfly

Eresina jacksoni, the Jackson's eresina, is a butterfly in the family Lycaenidae. It is found in Sierra Leone, Ivory Coast, southern and eastern Nigeria, Cameroon, Uganda and western Kenya. Its habitat consists of dense, primary forests.
