= Eresina pseudofusca =

Scientific classification
- Kingdom: Animalia
- Phylum: Arthropoda
- Class: Insecta
- Order: Lepidoptera
- Family: Lycaenidae
- Genus: Eresina
- Species: E. pseudofusca

Binomial name
- Eresina pseudofusca Stempffer, 1961

Species of butterfly

Eresina pseudofusca, the warm sienna eresina, is a butterfly in the family Lycaenidae. It is found in Ivory Coast, Ghana, Nigeria and western Cameroon. Its habitat consists of dense, old-growth forests.
