= Micropentila kelleana =

Scientific classification
- Domain: Eukaryota
- Kingdom: Animalia
- Phylum: Arthropoda
- Class: Insecta
- Order: Lepidoptera
- Family: Lycaenidae
- Genus: Micropentila
- Species: M. kelleana

Binomial name
- Micropentila kelleana Stempffer & Bennett, 1965

Species of butterfly

Micropentila kelleana is a butterfly in the family Lycaenidae. It is found in the Republic of the Congo (Kelle). The habitat consists of primary forests.
