= Eresina masaka =

Scientific classification
- Domain: Eukaryota
- Kingdom: Animalia
- Phylum: Arthropoda
- Class: Insecta
- Order: Lepidoptera
- Family: Lycaenidae
- Genus: Eresina
- Species: E. masaka

Binomial name
- Eresina masaka Stempffer, 1962

Species of butterfly

Eresina masaka is a butterfly in the family Lycaenidae. It is found in Uganda (the south and the western shores of Lake Victoria), western Kenya and north-western Tanzania. Its habitat consists of dense, primary forests.
