= Tetrarhanis ogojae =

Scientific classification
- Kingdom: Animalia
- Phylum: Arthropoda
- Class: Insecta
- Order: Lepidoptera
- Family: Lycaenidae
- Genus: Tetrarhanis
- Species: T. ogojae

Binomial name
- Tetrarhanis ogojae (Stempffer, 1961)

Synonyms
- Liptena (Tetrarhanis) ogojae Stempffer, 1961

Species of butterfly

Tetrarhanis ogojae, the Ogoja on-off, is a butterfly in the family Lycaenidae. It is found in Nigeria (south and the Cross River loop) and western Cameroon. The habitat consists of primary forests.
