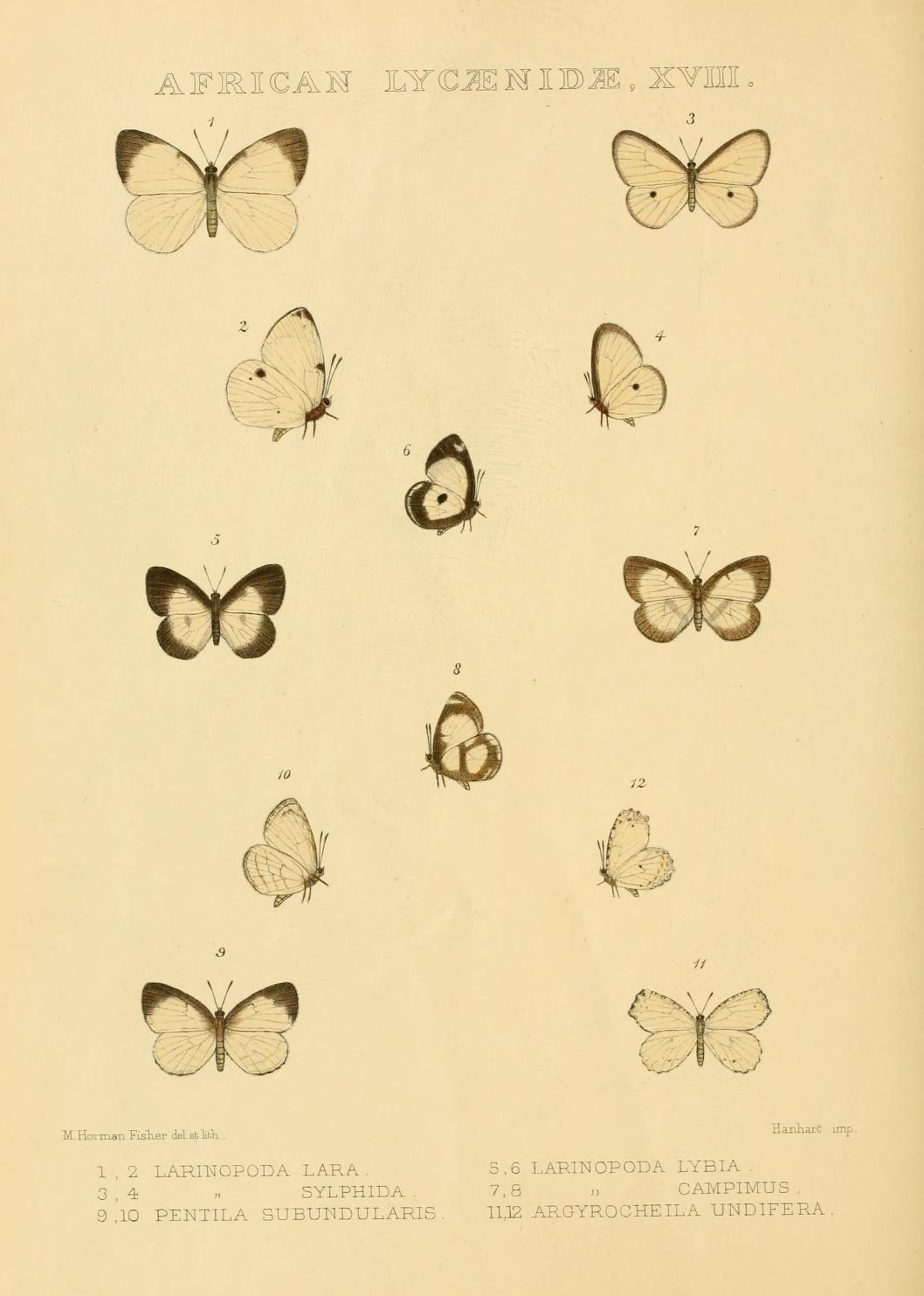
- Falcuna – figures 5, 6, 7 and 8

Scientific classification
- Domain: Eukaryota
- Kingdom: Animalia
- Phylum: Arthropoda
- Class: Insecta
- Order: Lepidoptera
- Family: Lycaenidae
- Genus: Falcuna; Stempffer & Bennett, 1963

= Falcuna =

Butterfly genus in family Lycaenidae

Falcuna is a genus of butterflies in the family Lycaenidae. Falcuna is endemic to the Afrotropical realm.

== Species ==
- Falcuna campimus (Holland, 1890)
- Falcuna dorotheae Stempffer & Bennett, 1963
- Falcuna gitte Bennett, 1969
- Falcuna hollandi (Aurivillius, 1895)
- Falcuna iturina Stempffer & Bennett, 1963
- Falcuna kasai Stempffer & Bennett, 1963
- Falcuna lacteata Stempffer & Bennett, 1963
- Falcuna leonensis Stempffer & Bennett, 1963
- Falcuna libyssa (Hewitson, 1866)
- Falcuna lybia (Staudinger, [1892])
- Falcuna margarita (Suffert, 1904)
- Falcuna melandeta (Holland, 1893)
- Falcuna orientalis (Bethune-Baker, 1906)
- Falcuna overlaeti Stempffer & Bennett, 1963
- Falcuna reducta Stempffer & Bennett, 1963
- Falcuna semliki Stempffer & Bennett, 1963
- Falcuna synesia (Hulstaert, 1924)
