= Micropentila nigeriana =

Scientific classification
- Domain: Eukaryota
- Kingdom: Animalia
- Phylum: Arthropoda
- Class: Insecta
- Order: Lepidoptera
- Family: Lycaenidae
- Genus: Micropentila
- Species: M. nigeriana

Binomial name
- Micropentila nigeriana Stempffer & Bennett, 1965

Species of butterfly

Micropentila nigeriana, the Nigerian dots, is a butterfly in the family Lycaenidae. It is found in Ghana and Nigeria (west and Cross River loop). The habitat consists of primary forests.
