= Eresina conradti =

Scientific classification
- Domain: Eukaryota
- Kingdom: Animalia
- Phylum: Arthropoda
- Class: Insecta
- Order: Lepidoptera
- Family: Lycaenidae
- Genus: Eresina
- Species: E. conradti

Binomial name
- Eresina conradti Stempffer, 1956

Species of butterfly

Eresina conradti is a butterfly in the family Lycaenidae. It is found in Cameroon, Uganda and north-western Tanzania. Its habitat consists of dense, primary forests.
