= Micropentila flavopunctata =

Scientific classification
- Domain: Eukaryota
- Kingdom: Animalia
- Phylum: Arthropoda
- Class: Insecta
- Order: Lepidoptera
- Family: Lycaenidae
- Genus: Micropentila
- Species: M. flavopunctata

Binomial name
- Micropentila flavopunctata Stempffer & Bennett, 1965

Species of butterfly

Micropentila flavopunctata, the rare brown dots, is a butterfly in the family Lycaenidae. It is found in Nigeria (east and the Cross River loop), Cameroon and the Republic of the Congo. Its habitat consists of primary forests found in those countries.
