= Micropentila victoriae =

Scientific classification
- Domain: Eukaryota
- Kingdom: Animalia
- Phylum: Arthropoda
- Class: Insecta
- Order: Lepidoptera
- Family: Lycaenidae
- Genus: Micropentila
- Species: M. victoriae

Binomial name
- Micropentila victoriae Stempffer & Bennett, 1965

Species of butterfly

Micropentila victoriae, the Victoria dots, is a butterfly in the family Lycaenidae. It is found in the Democratic Republic of the Congo (Ituri and North Kivu), Uganda, western Kenya and north-western Tanzania. The habitat consists of primary forests.
