= Tetrarhanis rougeoti =

Scientific classification
- Kingdom: Animalia
- Phylum: Arthropoda
- Clade: Pancrustacea
- Class: Insecta
- Order: Lepidoptera
- Family: Lycaenidae
- Genus: Tetrarhanis
- Species: T. rougeoti

Binomial name
- Tetrarhanis rougeoti (Stempffer, 1954)

Synonyms
- Liptena (Tetrarhanis) rougeoti Stempffer, 1954

Species of butterfly

Tetrarhanis rougeoti is a butterfly in the family Lycaenidae. It is found in Gabon, the Republic of the Congo and Equateur in the Democratic Republic of the Congo. The habitat consists of primary forests.
