= Tetrarhanis souanke =

Scientific classification
- Kingdom: Animalia
- Phylum: Arthropoda
- Class: Insecta
- Order: Lepidoptera
- Family: Lycaenidae
- Genus: Tetrarhanis
- Species: T. souanke

Binomial name
- Tetrarhanis souanke (Stempffer, 1962)

Synonyms
- Liptena (Tetrarhamis) souanke Stempffer, 1962

Species of butterfly

Tetrarhanis souanke is a butterfly in the family Lycaenidae. It is found in the Republic of the Congo. The habitat consists of primary forests.
