= Falcuna lacteata =

Scientific classification
- Kingdom: Animalia
- Phylum: Arthropoda
- Class: Insecta
- Order: Lepidoptera
- Family: Lycaenidae
- Genus: Falcuna
- Species: F. lacteata

Binomial name
- Falcuna lacteata Stempffer & Bennett, 1963

Species of butterfly

Falcuna lacteata is a butterfly in the family Lycaenidae. It is found in Angola. The habitat consists of primary forests.
