= Oxylides bella =

Scientific classification
- Kingdom: Animalia
- Phylum: Arthropoda
- Clade: Pancrustacea
- Class: Insecta
- Order: Lepidoptera
- Family: Lycaenidae
- Genus: Oxylides
- Species: O. bella

Binomial name
- Oxylides bella Aurivillius, 1899

Species of butterfly

Oxylides bella is a butterfly in the family Lycaenidae. It is found in the Democratic Republic of the Congo. It is very close to Oxylides faunus differing in that the hindwing beneath at the anal angle between the anal spots and the distal transverse line in the areas 1 b to 2 is extensively suffused with yellow. The discal line beneath from the costal margin of the forewing to vein 3 of the hindwing black, behind it yellow.
