= Eresina katera =

Scientific classification
- Domain: Eukaryota
- Kingdom: Animalia
- Phylum: Arthropoda
- Class: Insecta
- Order: Lepidoptera
- Family: Lycaenidae
- Genus: Eresina
- Species: E. katera

Binomial name
- Eresina katera Stempffer, 1962

Species of butterfly

Eresina katera is a butterfly in the family Lycaenidae. It is found in Uganda (the western shores of Lake Victoria) and north-western Tanzania. Its habitat consists of dense, primary forests.
