= Falcuna overlaeti =

Scientific classification
- Kingdom: Animalia
- Phylum: Arthropoda
- Clade: Pancrustacea
- Class: Insecta
- Order: Lepidoptera
- Family: Lycaenidae
- Genus: Falcuna
- Species: F. overlaeti

Binomial name
- Falcuna overlaeti Stempffer & Bennett, 1963

Species of butterfly

Falcuna overlaeti is a butterfly in the family Lycaenidae. It is found in the Democratic Republic of the Congo (Lulua). The habitat consists of primary forests.
