= Falcuna dorotheae =

Scientific classification
- Domain: Eukaryota
- Kingdom: Animalia
- Phylum: Arthropoda
- Class: Insecta
- Order: Lepidoptera
- Family: Lycaenidae
- Genus: Falcuna
- Species: F. dorotheae

Binomial name
- Falcuna dorotheae Stempffer & Bennett, 1963

Species of butterfly

Falcuna dorotheae is a butterfly in the family Lycaenidae. It is found in Cameroon and North Kivu in the Democratic Republic of the Congo. The habitat consists of primary forests.
