= Eresina theodori =

Scientific classification
- Domain: Eukaryota
- Kingdom: Animalia
- Phylum: Arthropoda
- Class: Insecta
- Order: Lepidoptera
- Family: Lycaenidae
- Genus: Eresina
- Species: E. theodori

Binomial name
- Eresina theodori Stempffer, 1956

Species of butterfly

Eresina theodori, the Theodor's eresina, is a butterfly in the family Lycaenidae. It is found in Sierra Leone, Ivory Coast, Ghana and western Nigeria. Its habitat consists of dense, primary forests.
