= Falcuna iturina =

Scientific classification
- Domain: Eukaryota
- Kingdom: Animalia
- Phylum: Arthropoda
- Class: Insecta
- Order: Lepidoptera
- Family: Lycaenidae
- Genus: Falcuna
- Species: F. iturina

Binomial name
- Falcuna iturina Stempffer & Bennett, 1963

Species of butterfly

Falcuna iturina is a butterfly in the family Lycaenidae. It is found in the Democratic Republic of the Congo (Ituri and North Kivu) and Uganda (the Bwamba Valley). The habitat consists of primary forests.
