= Eresina fontainei =

Scientific classification
- Domain: Eukaryota
- Kingdom: Animalia
- Phylum: Arthropoda
- Class: Insecta
- Order: Lepidoptera
- Family: Lycaenidae
- Genus: Eresina
- Species: E. fontainei

Binomial name
- Eresina fontainei Stempffer, 1956

Species of butterfly

Eresina fontainei, the Fontaine's eresina, is a butterfly in the family Lycaenidae. It is found in Sierra Leone, Ivory Coast, Cameroon, the Democratic Republic of the Congo (Sankuru), Uganda, western Kenya, north-western Tanzania and possibly Nigeria. Its habitat consists of dense, primary forests.
