= Micropentila bitjeana =

Scientific classification
- Kingdom: Animalia
- Phylum: Arthropoda
- Class: Insecta
- Order: Lepidoptera
- Family: Lycaenidae
- Genus: Micropentila
- Species: M. bitjeana

Binomial name
- Micropentila bitjeana Stempffer & Bennett, 1965

Species of butterfly

Micropentila bitjeana is a butterfly in the family Lycaenidae. It is found in Bitje in Cameroon. The habitat consists of primary forests.
