= Micropentila katerae =

Scientific classification
- Domain: Eukaryota
- Kingdom: Animalia
- Phylum: Arthropoda
- Class: Insecta
- Order: Lepidoptera
- Family: Lycaenidae
- Genus: Micropentila
- Species: M. katerae

Binomial name
- Micropentila katerae Stempffer & Bennett, 1965

Species of butterfly

Micropentila katerae is a butterfly in the family Lycaenidae. It is found in the Ugandan jungle(western shore of Lake Victoria) and north-western Tanzania. The habitat consists of primary forests.
