= Micropentila villiersi =

Scientific classification
- Domain: Eukaryota
- Kingdom: Animalia
- Phylum: Arthropoda
- Class: Insecta
- Order: Lepidoptera
- Family: Lycaenidae
- Genus: Micropentila
- Species: M. villiersi

Binomial name
- Micropentila villiersi Stempffer, 1970

Species of butterfly

Micropentila villiersi is a butterfly in the family Lycaenidae. It is found in Gabon. The habitat consists of primary forests.
