= Falcuna gitte =

Scientific classification
- Domain: Eukaryota
- Kingdom: Animalia
- Phylum: Arthropoda
- Class: Insecta
- Order: Lepidoptera
- Family: Lycaenidae
- Genus: Falcuna
- Species: F. gitte

Binomial name
- Falcuna gitte Bennett, 1969

Species of butterfly

Falcuna gitte, the Gitte's marble, is a butterfly in the family Lycaenidae. It is found in western Nigeria. The habitat consists of primary forests and dense secondary growth.
