= Falcuna synesia =

Scientific classification
- Domain: Eukaryota
- Kingdom: Animalia
- Phylum: Arthropoda
- Class: Insecta
- Order: Lepidoptera
- Family: Lycaenidae
- Genus: Falcuna
- Species: F. synesia

Binomial name
- Falcuna synesia (Hulstaert, 1924)

Synonyms
- Liptena synesia Hulstaert, 1924; Falcuna synesia f. landana Stempffer and Bennett, 1963

Species of butterfly

Falcuna synesia is a butterfly in the family Lycaenidae. It is found in Cameroon, Angola, the Democratic Republic of the Congo, the Central African Republic, Gabon, the Republic of the Congo and Equatorial Guinea. The habitat consists of primary forests.

== Subspecies ==
- Falcuna synesia synesia (Angola: Cabinda, Democratic Republic of the Congo: Mayumbe)
- Falcuna synesia fusca Stempffer & Bennett, 1963 (Cameroon, Central African Republic)
- Falcuna synesia gabonensis Stempffer & Bennett, 1963 (Gabon, Congo, Equatorial Guinea: Mbini and Bioko)
