= Micropentila cingulum =

Scientific classification
- Domain: Eukaryota
- Kingdom: Animalia
- Phylum: Arthropoda
- Class: Insecta
- Order: Lepidoptera
- Family: Lycaenidae
- Genus: Micropentila
- Species: M. cingulum

Binomial name
- Micropentila cingulum H. H. Druce, 1910

Species of butterfly

Micropentila cingulum is a butterfly in the family Lycaenidae first described by Hamilton Herbert Druce in 1910. It is found in Cameroon, the Republic of the Congo and Gabon. The habitat consists of primary forests.
