= Tetrarhanis okwangwo =

Scientific classification
- Kingdom: Animalia
- Phylum: Arthropoda
- Class: Insecta
- Order: Lepidoptera
- Family: Lycaenidae
- Genus: Tetrarhanis
- Species: T. okwangwo

Binomial name
- Tetrarhanis okwangwo Larsen, 1998

Species of butterfly

Tetrarhanis okwangwo, the Okwangwo on-off, is a butterfly in the family Lycaenidae. It is found in Nigeria (east and the Cross River loop), western Cameroon and the Republic of the Congo. The habitat consists of primary forests.

Adults have been recorded on wing in November and January.
