= Micropentila fulvula =

Scientific classification
- Domain: Eukaryota
- Kingdom: Animalia
- Phylum: Arthropoda
- Class: Insecta
- Order: Lepidoptera
- Family: Lycaenidae
- Genus: Micropentila
- Species: M. fulvula

Binomial name
- Micropentila fulvula Hawker-Smith, 1933

Species of butterfly

Micropentila fulvula is a butterfly in the family Lycaenidae. It is found in Cameroon and the Republic of the Congo. The habitat consists of primary forests.
