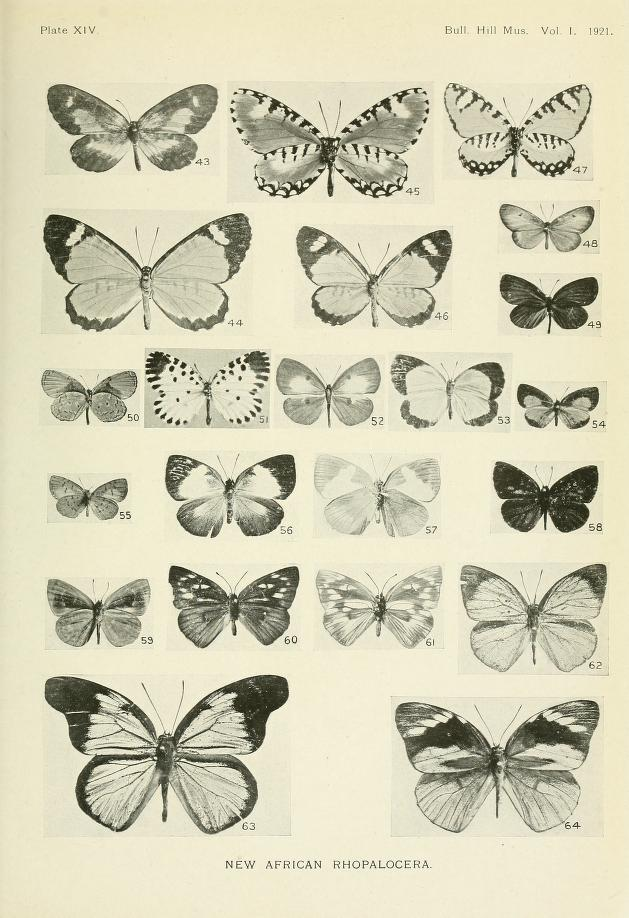
- Eresina toroensis female, figure 54 upperside, 55 underside

Scientific classification
- Domain: Eukaryota
- Kingdom: Animalia
- Phylum: Arthropoda
- Class: Insecta
- Order: Lepidoptera
- Family: Lycaenidae
- Tribe: Liptenini
- Genus: Eresina; Aurivillius, 1899

= Eresina =

Butterfly genus in family Lycaenidae

Eresina is a genus of butterflies in the family Lycaenidae. The species of this genus are endemic to the Afrotropical realm.

== Species ==
- Eresina bergeri Stempffer, 1956
- Eresina bilinea Talbot, 1935
- Eresina conradti Stempffer, 1956
- Eresina corynetes (Grose-Smith & Kirby, 1890)
- Eresina crola Talbot, 1935
- Eresina fontainei Stempffer, 1956
- Eresina fusca (Cator, 1904)
- Eresina jacksoni Stempffer, 1961
- Eresina katangana Stempffer, 1956
- Eresina katera Stempffer, 1962
- Eresina likouala Stempffer, 1962
- Eresina maesseni Stempffer, 1956
- Eresina masaka Stempffer, 1962
- Eresina pseudofusca Stempffer, 1961
- Eresina rougeoti Stempffer, 1956
- Eresina saundersi Stempffer, 1956
- Eresina schmitti Larsen, 2005
- Eresina theodori Stempffer, 1956
- Eresina toroensis Joicey & Talbot, 1921
