= Epitoxis procridia =

Scientific classification
- Domain: Eukaryota
- Kingdom: Animalia
- Phylum: Arthropoda
- Class: Insecta
- Order: Lepidoptera
- Superfamily: Noctuoidea
- Family: Erebidae
- Subfamily: Arctiinae
- Genus: Epitoxis
- Species: E. procridia

Binomial name
- Epitoxis procridia Hampson, 1898

Species of insect

Epitoxis procridia is a moth of the subfamily Arctiinae. It was described by George Hampson in 1898. It is found in Kenya and Uganda.
