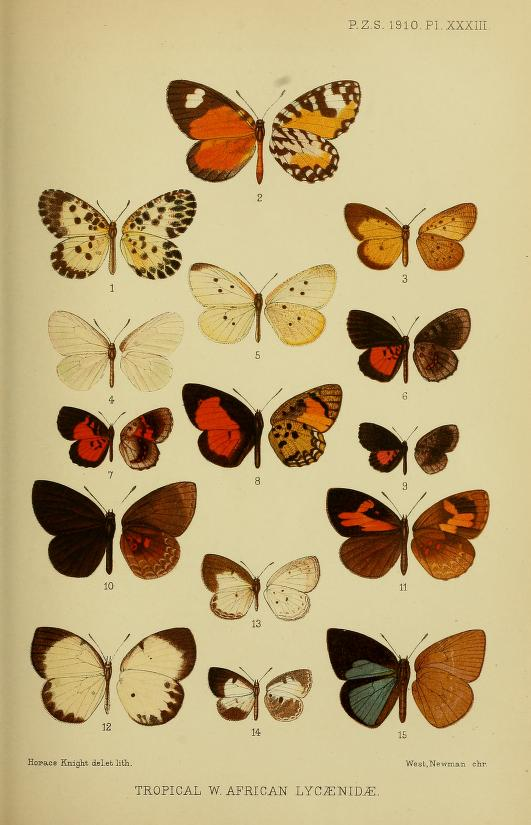
- Tetrarhanis nubifera figure 14

Scientific classification
- Domain: Eukaryota
- Kingdom: Animalia
- Phylum: Arthropoda
- Class: Insecta
- Order: Lepidoptera
- Family: Lycaenidae
- Subfamily: Poritiinae
- Genus: Tetrarhanis; Karsch, 1893

Synonyms
- Lectiles Birket-Smith, 1960

= Tetrarhanis =

Butterfly genus in family Lycaenidae

Tetrarhanis is a genus of butterflies in the family Lycaenidae. The species of this genus are endemic to the Afrotropical realm.

== Species ==
- Tetrarhanis baralingam (Larsen, 1998)
- Tetrarhanis diversa (Bethune-Baker, 1904)
- Tetrarhanis ilala (Riley, 1929)
- Tetrarhanis ilma (Hewitson, 1873)
- Tetrarhanis laminifer Clench, 1965
- Tetrarhanis nubifera (Druce, 1910)
- Tetrarhanis ogojae (Stempffer, 1961)
- Tetrarhanis okwangwo Larsen, 1998
- Tetrarhanis onitshae (Stempffer, 1962)
- Tetrarhanis rougeoti (Stempffer, 1954)
- Tetrarhanis schoutedeni (Berger, 1954)
- Tetrarhanis simplex (Aurivillius, 1895)
- Tetrarhanis souanke (Stempffer, 1962)
- Tetrarhanis stempfferi (Berger, 1954)
- Tetrarhanis symplocus Clench, 1965
