= Tetrarhanis baralingam =

Scientific classification
- Kingdom: Animalia
- Phylum: Arthropoda
- Class: Insecta
- Order: Lepidoptera
- Family: Lycaenidae
- Genus: Tetrarhanis
- Species: T. baralingam

Binomial name
- Tetrarhanis baralingam (Larsen, 1998)

Synonyms
- Thermoniphas baralingam Larsen, 1998

Species of butterfly

Tetrarhanis baralingam, the Baralingam on-off, is a butterfly in the family Lycaenidae. It is found in Sierra Leone, Ivory Coast, southern Ghana and Liberia (Sapo National Park). Their habitat consists of primary forests.
