= Epitoxis namaqua =

Scientific classification
- Kingdom: Animalia
- Phylum: Arthropoda
- Clade: Pancrustacea
- Class: Insecta
- Order: Lepidoptera
- Superfamily: Noctuoidea
- Family: Erebidae
- Subfamily: Arctiinae
- Genus: Epitoxis
- Species: E. namaqua

Binomial name
- Epitoxis namaqua de Freina & Mey, 2011

Species of moth

Epitoxis namaqua is a moth of the subfamily Arctiinae. It is found in South Africa.
