= Epitoxis ansorgei =

Scientific classification
- Domain: Eukaryota
- Kingdom: Animalia
- Phylum: Arthropoda
- Class: Insecta
- Order: Lepidoptera
- Superfamily: Noctuoidea
- Family: Erebidae
- Subfamily: Arctiinae
- Genus: Epitoxis
- Species: E. ansorgei

Binomial name
- Epitoxis ansorgei Rothschild, 1910

Species of moth

Epitoxis ansorgei is a moth of the subfamily Arctiinae. It was described by Rothschild in 1910. It is found in Kenya and Uganda.
