= Tetrarhanis ilala =

Scientific classification
- Kingdom: Animalia
- Phylum: Arthropoda
- Class: Insecta
- Order: Lepidoptera
- Family: Lycaenidae
- Genus: Tetrarhanis
- Species: T. ilala

Binomial name
- Tetrarhanis ilala (Riley, 1929)

Synonyms
- Liptena diversa ilala Riley, 1929; Liptena (Tetrarhanis) etoumbi Stempffer, 1964

Species of butterfly

Tetrarhanis ilala is a butterfly in the family Lycaenidae. It is found in Cameroon, Gabon, the Republic of the Congo, the Central African Republic, the Democratic Republic of the Congo, Sudan, Uganda and Kenya. The habitat consists of primary forests.

== Subspecies ==
- Tetrarhanis ilala ilala (southern Sudan, Uganda, western Kenya)
- Tetrarhanis ilala etoumbi (Stempffer, 1964) (Cameroon, Gabon, Congo, Central African Republic, Democratic Republic of the Congo)
