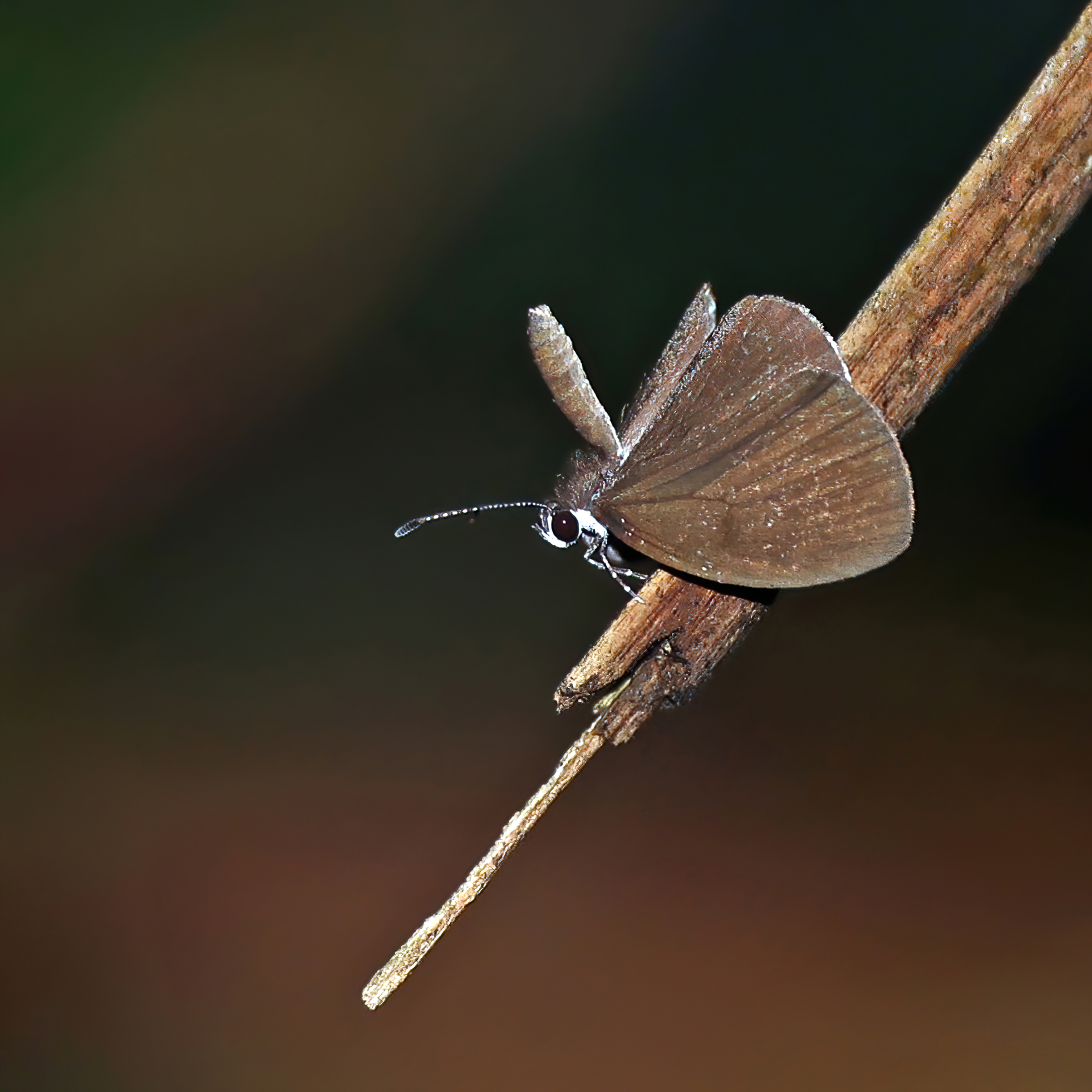

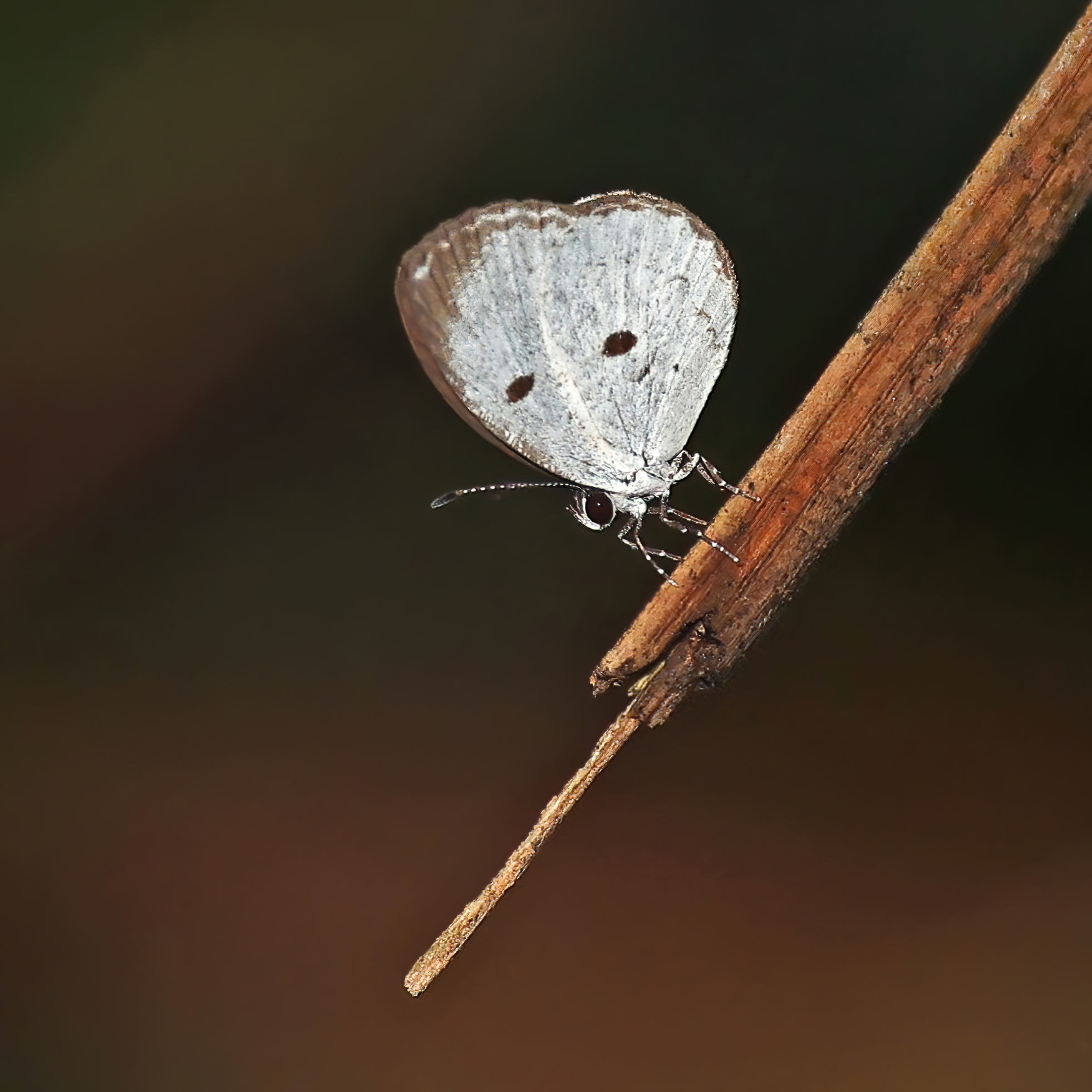
- The same male in Ghana

Scientific classification
- Kingdom: Animalia
- Phylum: Arthropoda
- Clade: Pancrustacea
- Class: Insecta
- Order: Lepidoptera
- Family: Lycaenidae
- Genus: Tetrarhanis
- Species: T. symplocus

Binomial name
- Tetrarhanis symplocus Clench, 1965

Synonyms
- Tetrarhanis simplex symplocus Clench, 1965

= Tetrarhanis symplocus =

Species of butterfly

Tetrarhanis symplocus, the Clench's on-off, is a butterfly in the family Lycaenidae. It is found in Liberia, Ivory Coast, Ghana, Togo, Benin and western Nigeria. The habitat consists of primary forests.

Torben Larsen developed a species numbering system for his 2005 publication Butterflies of West Africa. This species is #254. The 'Larsen' numbers have since been used with permission in A Sharp Eye on Butterflies of Ghana.
