= Micropentila mamfe =

Scientific classification
- Domain: Eukaryota
- Kingdom: Animalia
- Phylum: Arthropoda
- Class: Insecta
- Order: Lepidoptera
- Family: Lycaenidae
- Genus: Micropentila
- Species: M. mamfe

Binomial name
- Micropentila mamfe Larsen, 1986

Species of butterfly

Micropentila mamfe, the Ghana dots, is a butterfly in the family Lycaenidae. It is found in Ivory Coast and Ghana. The habitat consists of primary forests.
