= Micropentila galenides =

Scientific classification
- Kingdom: Animalia
- Phylum: Arthropoda
- Class: Insecta
- Order: Lepidoptera
- Family: Lycaenidae
- Genus: Micropentila
- Species: M. galenides

Binomial name
- Micropentila galenides (Holland, 1895)

Synonyms
- Teriomima galenides Holland, 1895

Species of butterfly

Micropentila galenides is a butterfly in the family Lycaenidae. It is found in Cameroon. The habitat consists of primary forests.
