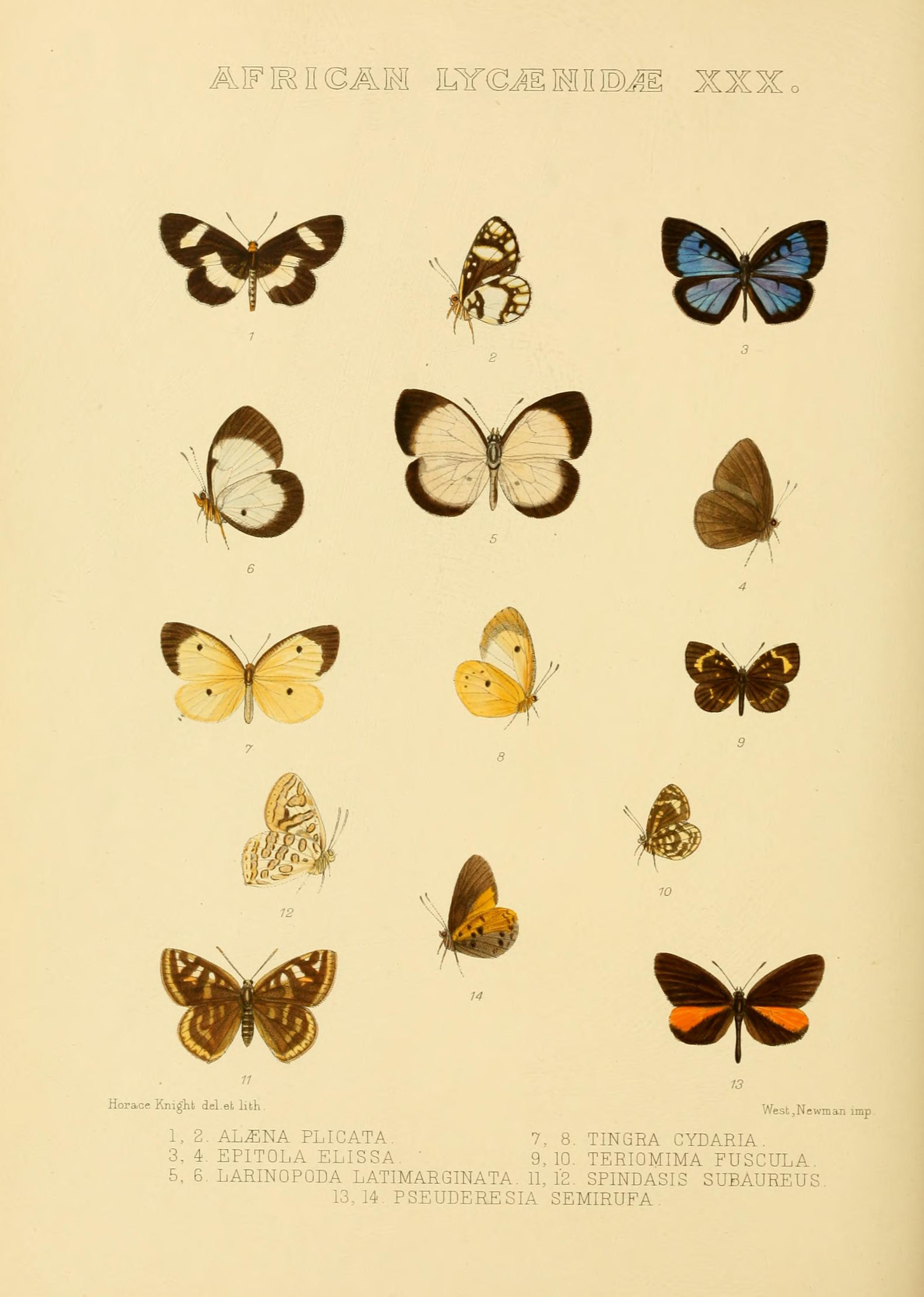
- Figures 9 and 10

Scientific classification
- Domain: Eukaryota
- Kingdom: Animalia
- Phylum: Arthropoda
- Class: Insecta
- Order: Lepidoptera
- Family: Lycaenidae
- Genus: Micropentila
- Species: M. fuscula

Binomial name
- Micropentila fuscula (Grose-Smith, 1898)

Synonyms
- Teriomima fuscula Grose-Smith, 1898

= Micropentila fuscula =

Species of butterfly

Micropentila fuscula, the banded dots, is a butterfly in the family Lycaenidae. It is found in Nigeria and Cameroon. Its habitat consists of primary forests.
