= Micropentila catocala =

Scientific classification
- Kingdom: Animalia
- Phylum: Arthropoda
- Class: Insecta
- Order: Lepidoptera
- Family: Lycaenidae
- Genus: Micropentila
- Species: M. catocala

Binomial name
- Micropentila catocala Strand, 1914

Species of butterfly

Micropentila catocala is a butterfly in the family Lycaenidae. It is found in Cameroon. The habitat consists of primary forests.
