= Oxylides gloveri =

Scientific classification
- Kingdom: Animalia
- Phylum: Arthropoda
- Class: Insecta
- Order: Lepidoptera
- Family: Lycaenidae
- Genus: Oxylides
- Species: O. gloveri

Binomial name
- Oxylides gloveri Hawker-Smith, 1929

Species of butterfly

Oxylides gloveri is a butterfly in the family Lycaenidae. It is found in the Republic of the Congo and the Democratic Republic of the Congo.
