= Tetrarhanis nubifera =

Scientific classification
- Kingdom: Animalia
- Phylum: Arthropoda
- Class: Insecta
- Order: Lepidoptera
- Family: Lycaenidae
- Genus: Tetrarhanis
- Species: T. nubifera

Binomial name
- Tetrarhanis nubifera (H. H. Druce, 1910)

Synonyms
- Liptena nubifera H. H. Druce, 1910

Species of butterfly

Tetrarhanis nubifera, the white on-off, is a butterfly in the family Lycaenidae. The species was first described by Hamilton Herbert Druce in 1910. It is found in Cameroon, the Republic of the Congo and possibly south-eastern Nigeria. The habitat consists of primary forests.
