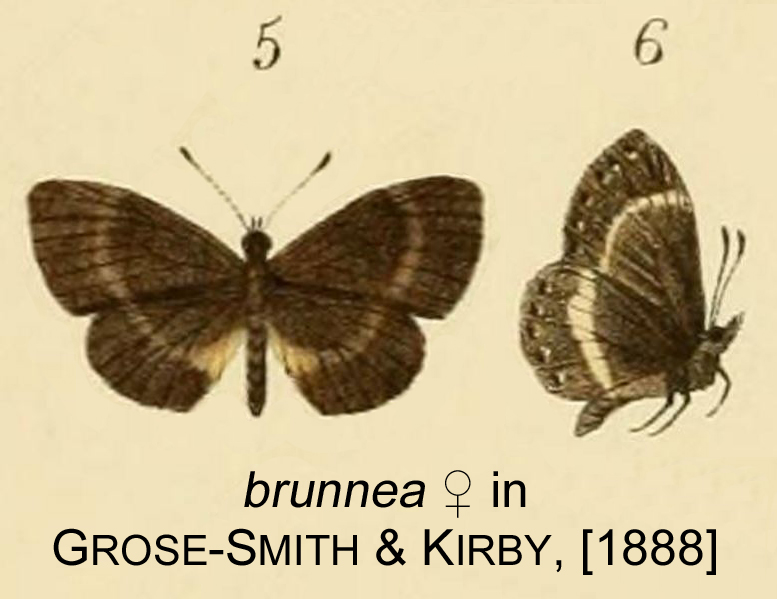

Scientific classification
- Domain: Eukaryota
- Kingdom: Animalia
- Phylum: Arthropoda
- Class: Insecta
- Order: Lepidoptera
- Family: Lycaenidae
- Genus: Micropentila
- Species: M. brunnea

Binomial name
- Micropentila brunnea (Kirby, 1887)

Synonyms
- Lucia brunnea Kirby, 1887

= Micropentila brunnea =

Species of butterfly

Micropentila brunnea, the brown dots, is a butterfly in the family Lycaenidae. It is found in Sierra Leone, Liberia, Ivory Coast, Ghana, Nigeria, Cameroon, Equatorial Guinea, Gabon, the Republic of the Congo and the Democratic Republic of the Congo. The habitat consists of primary forests.

== Subspecies ==
- Micropentila brunnea brunnea (Sierra Leone, Liberia, Ivory Coast, Ghana, Nigeria: south and Cross River loop, Cameroon, Equatorial Guinea: Bioko)
- Micropentila brunnea centralis Bennett, 1966 (Gabon, Congo, Democratic Republic of the Congo: Ituri, North Kivu, Sankuru and Lualaba)
