= Epitoxis myopsychoides =

Scientific classification
- Domain: Eukaryota
- Kingdom: Animalia
- Phylum: Arthropoda
- Class: Insecta
- Order: Lepidoptera
- Superfamily: Noctuoidea
- Family: Erebidae
- Subfamily: Arctiinae
- Genus: Epitoxis
- Species: E. myopsychoides

Binomial name
- Epitoxis myopsychoides Strand, 1912

Synonyms
- Syntomerea typica Strand, 1912

Species of moth

Epitoxis myopsychoides is a moth of the subfamily Arctiinae. It was described by Strand in 1912. It is found in Equatorial Guinea.
