= Eresina fusca =

Scientific classification
- Domain: Eukaryota
- Kingdom: Animalia
- Phylum: Arthropoda
- Class: Insecta
- Order: Lepidoptera
- Family: Lycaenidae
- Genus: Eresina
- Species: E. fusca

Binomial name
- Eresina fusca (Cator, 1904)

Synonyms
- Pseuderesia fusca Cator, 1904

Species of butterfly

Eresina fusca, the Cator's eresina, is a butterfly in the family Lycaenidae. It is found in Sierra Leone, Ivory Coast and possibly Nigeria. Its habitat consists of dense, primary forests.
