= Micropentila ugandae =

Scientific classification
- Domain: Eukaryota
- Kingdom: Animalia
- Phylum: Arthropoda
- Class: Insecta
- Order: Lepidoptera
- Family: Lycaenidae
- Genus: Micropentila
- Species: M. ugandae

Binomial name
- Micropentila ugandae Hawker-Smith, 1933

Synonyms
- Micropentila cingulum ugandae Hawker-Smith, 1933

Species of butterfly

Micropentila ugandae is a butterfly in the family Lycaenidae. It is found in Cameroon, Gabon, the Republic of the Congo, the Democratic Republic of the Congo (Uele, Tshopa and Lualaba), Uganda and north-western Tanzania. The habitat consists of primary forests.
