= Micropentila subplagata =

Scientific classification
- Domain: Eukaryota
- Kingdom: Animalia
- Phylum: Arthropoda
- Class: Insecta
- Order: Lepidoptera
- Family: Lycaenidae
- Genus: Micropentila
- Species: M. subplagata

Binomial name
- Micropentila subplagata Bethune-Baker, 1915

Species of butterfly

Micropentila subplagata is a butterfly in the family Lycaenidae. It is found in Cameroon and the Masaka District of Uganda. The habitat consists of primary forests.
