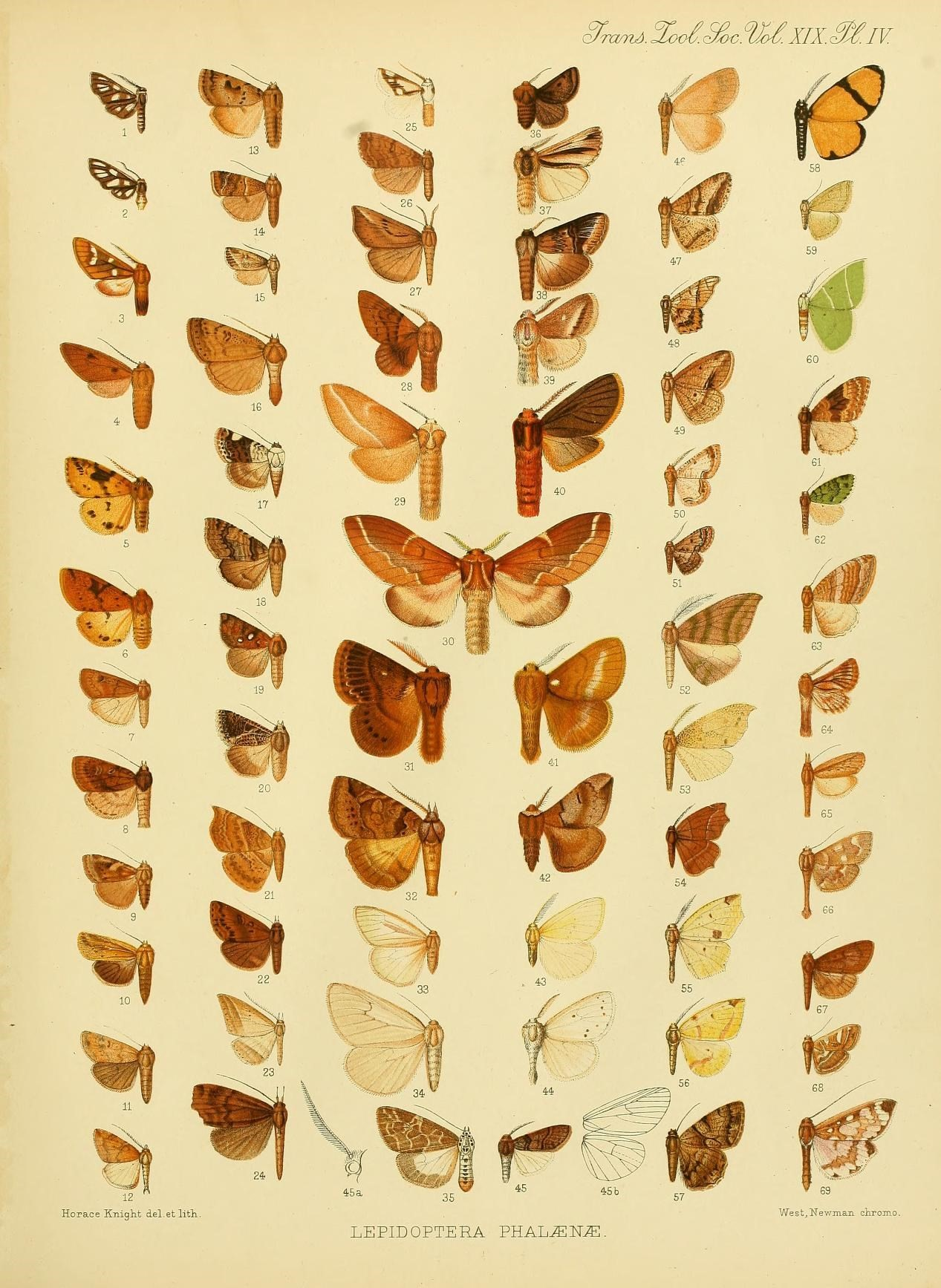
- Fig 1 Male, Fig 2 Female

Scientific classification
- Domain: Eukaryota
- Kingdom: Animalia
- Phylum: Arthropoda
- Class: Insecta
- Order: Lepidoptera
- Superfamily: Noctuoidea
- Family: Erebidae
- Subfamily: Arctiinae
- Genus: Epitoxis
- Species: E. albicincta

Binomial name
- Epitoxis albicincta Hampson, 1903

= Epitoxis albicincta =

Species of moth

Epitoxis albicincta is a moth of the subfamily Arctiinae. It was described by George Hampson in 1903. It is found in the Democratic Republic of the Congo, Kenya, Tanzania and Uganda.
