= Tetrarhanis schoutedeni =

Scientific classification
- Kingdom: Animalia
- Phylum: Arthropoda
- Class: Insecta
- Order: Lepidoptera
- Family: Lycaenidae
- Genus: Tetrarhanis
- Species: T. schoutedeni

Binomial name
- Tetrarhanis schoutedeni (Berger, 1954)

Synonyms
- Liptena (Tetrarhanis) schoutedeni Berger, 1954; Lectiles collitorum Birket-Smith, 1960

Species of butterfly

Tetrarhanis schoutedeni is a butterfly in the family Lycaenidae. It is found in Cameroon and Sankuru in the Democratic Republic of the Congo. Their habitat consists of primarily forests.
