= Micropentila jacksoni =

Scientific classification
- Kingdom: Animalia
- Phylum: Arthropoda
- Class: Insecta
- Order: Lepidoptera
- Family: Lycaenidae
- Genus: Micropentila
- Species: M. jacksoni

Binomial name
- Micropentila jacksoni Talbot, 1937

Species of butterfly

Micropentila jacksoni is a butterfly in the family Lycaenidae. It is found in Uganda (western shore of Lake Victoria) and north-western Tanzania. The habitat consists of primary forests.
