= Tetrarhanis laminifer =

Scientific classification
- Kingdom: Animalia
- Phylum: Arthropoda
- Class: Insecta
- Order: Lepidoptera
- Family: Lycaenidae
- Genus: Tetrarhanis
- Species: T. laminifer

Binomial name
- Tetrarhanis laminifer Clench, 1965

Species of butterfly

Tetrarhanis laminifer is a butterfly in the family Lycaenidae. It is found in Cameroon, Equatorial Guinea (Mbini) and Gabon. The habitat consists of primary forests.
