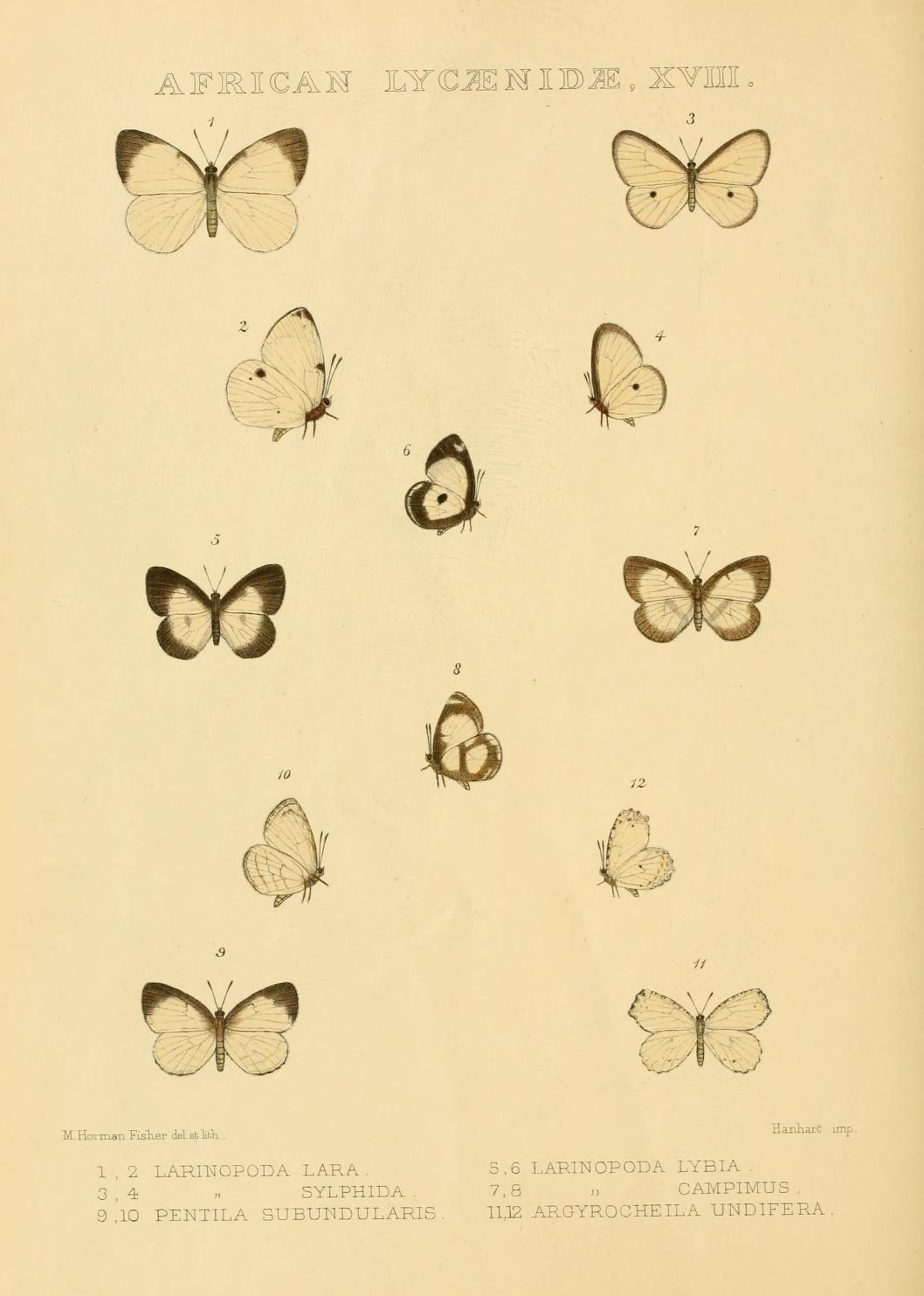
- Figures 5 and 6

Scientific classification
- Domain: Eukaryota
- Kingdom: Animalia
- Phylum: Arthropoda
- Class: Insecta
- Order: Lepidoptera
- Family: Lycaenidae
- Genus: Falcuna
- Species: F. lybia

Binomial name
- Falcuna lybia (Staudinger, 1892)

Synonyms
- Larinopoda lybia Staudinger, 1892

= Falcuna lybia =

Species of butterfly

Falcuna lybia is a butterfly in the family Lycaenidae. It is found in Cameroon, Gabon and the Republic of the Congo. The habitat consists of primary forests.
