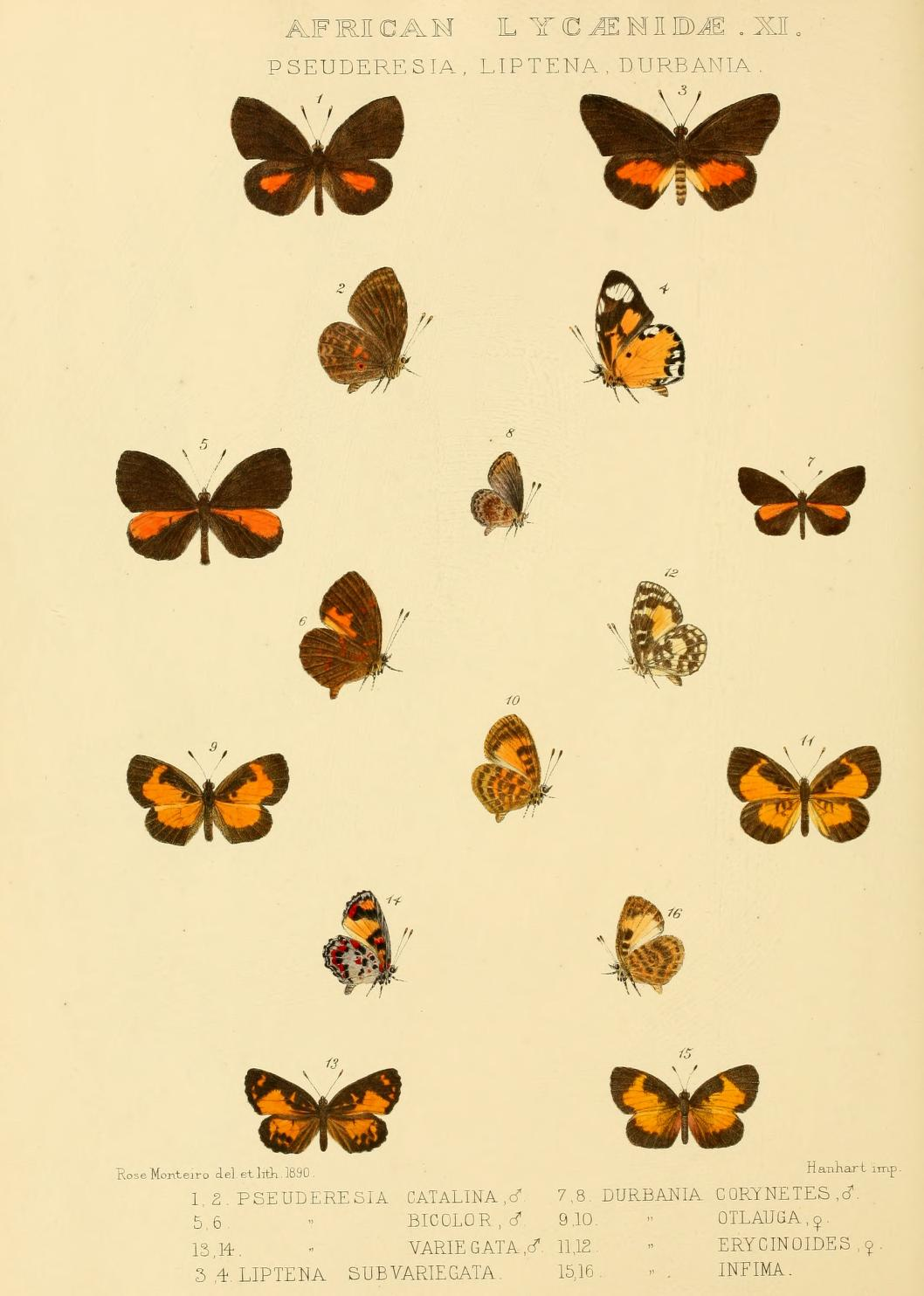

Scientific classification
- Domain: Eukaryota
- Kingdom: Animalia
- Phylum: Arthropoda
- Class: Insecta
- Order: Lepidoptera
- Family: Lycaenidae
- Genus: Eresina
- Species: E. corynetes

Binomial name
- Eresina corynetes (Grose-Smith & Kirby, 1890)

Synonyms
- Durbania corynetes Grose-Smith & Kirby, 1890

= Eresina corynetes =

Species of butterfly

Eresina corynetes is a butterfly in the family Lycaenidae. It is found in western Cameroon and Gabon. Its habitat consists of dense, primary forests.
