= Eresina crola =

Scientific classification
- Domain: Eukaryota
- Kingdom: Animalia
- Phylum: Arthropoda
- Class: Insecta
- Order: Lepidoptera
- Family: Lycaenidae
- Genus: Eresina
- Species: E. crola

Binomial name
- Eresina crola Talbot, 1935

Species of butterfly

Eresina crola is a butterfly in the family Lycaenidae. It is found in western Kenya and Uganda. Its habitat consists of dense, primary forests.
