= Epitoxis borguensis =

Scientific classification
- Kingdom: Animalia
- Phylum: Arthropoda
- Clade: Pancrustacea
- Class: Insecta
- Order: Lepidoptera
- Superfamily: Noctuoidea
- Family: Erebidae
- Subfamily: Arctiinae
- Genus: Epitoxis
- Species: E. borguensis

Binomial name
- Epitoxis borguensis Hampson, 1901

Species of moth

Epitoxis borguensis is a moth of the subfamily Arctiinae. It was described by George Hampson in 1901. It is found in Nigeria.
