= Epitoxis ceryxoides =

Scientific classification
- Kingdom: Animalia
- Phylum: Arthropoda
- Class: Insecta
- Order: Lepidoptera
- Superfamily: Noctuoidea
- Family: Erebidae
- Subfamily: Arctiinae
- Genus: Epitoxis
- Species: E. ceryxoides

Binomial name
- Epitoxis ceryxoides Berio, 1941

Species of moth

Epitoxis ceryxoides is a moth of the subfamily Arctiinae. It was described by Emilio Berio in 1941 and is found in the Democratic Republic of the Congo.
