= Falcuna hollandi =

Scientific classification
- Domain: Eukaryota
- Kingdom: Animalia
- Phylum: Arthropoda
- Class: Insecta
- Order: Lepidoptera
- Family: Lycaenidae
- Genus: Falcuna
- Species: F. hollandi

Binomial name
- Falcuna hollandi (Aurivillius, 1899)

Synonyms
- Liptena hollandi Aurivillius, 1899; Liptena libyssa var. hollandi Aurivillius, 1895

Species of butterfly

Falcuna hollandi is a butterfly in the family Lycaenidae. It is found in Cameroon, Equatorial Guinea, the Democratic Republic of the Congo, Angola and the Republic of the Congo. The habitat consists of primary forests.

== Subspecies ==
- Falcuna hollandi hollandi (Angola, Democratic Republic of the Congo: Lulua, Kasai and southern Sankuru)
- Falcuna hollandi nigricans Stempffer & Bennett, 1963 (Congo, Democratic Republic of the Congo: Uele, Tshuapa, Equateur, Sankuru and Lualaba)
- Falcuna hollandi suffusa Stempffer & Bennett, 1963 (Cameroon, Equatorial Guinea: Mbini)
