= Micropentila mabangi =

Scientific classification
- Domain: Eukaryota
- Kingdom: Animalia
- Phylum: Arthropoda
- Class: Insecta
- Order: Lepidoptera
- Family: Lycaenidae
- Genus: Micropentila
- Species: M. mabangi

Binomial name
- Micropentila mabangi Bethune-Baker, 1904

Species of butterfly

Micropentila mabangi, the Sierra Leone dots, is a butterfly in the family Lycaenidae. It is found in Sierra Leone and eastern Ivory Coast. The habitat consists of primary forests.
