= Epitoxis amazoula =

Scientific classification
- Domain: Eukaryota
- Kingdom: Animalia
- Phylum: Arthropoda
- Class: Insecta
- Order: Lepidoptera
- Superfamily: Noctuoidea
- Family: Erebidae
- Subfamily: Arctiinae
- Genus: Epitoxis
- Species: E. amazoula

Binomial name
- Epitoxis amazoula (Boisduval, 1847)

Synonyms
- Thyretes amazoula Boisduval, 1847

Species of moth

Epitoxis amazoula is a moth of the subfamily Arctiinae. It was described by Jean Baptiste Boisduval in 1847. It is found in South Africa.
