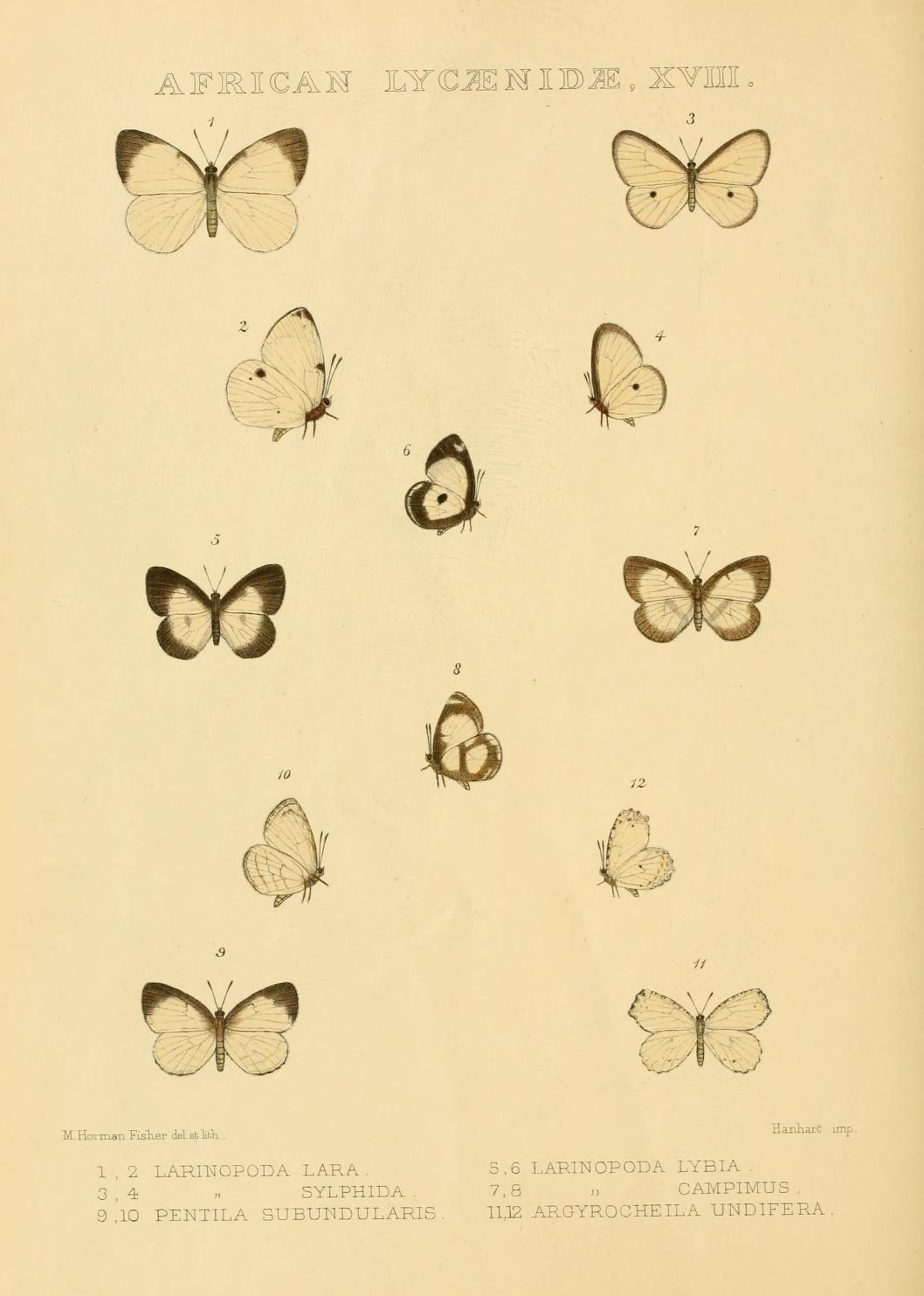

Scientific classification
- Kingdom: Animalia
- Phylum: Arthropoda
- Clade: Pancrustacea
- Class: Insecta
- Order: Lepidoptera
- Family: Lycaenidae
- Genus: Falcuna
- Species: F. campimus

Binomial name
- Falcuna campimus (Holland, 1890)

Synonyms
- Larinopoda campimus Holland, 1890; Liptena campimus var. dilatata Schultze, 1923

= Falcuna campimus =

Species of butterfly

Falcuna campimus, the scarce marble, is a butterfly in the family Lycaenidae. It is found in Liberia, Ivory Coast, Ghana, Nigeria, Cameroon, Gabon and possibly Sierra Leone. The habitat consists of primary forests.

== Subspecies ==
- Falcuna campimus campimus (Liberia, Ivory Coast, Ghana, Nigeria: south and the Cross River loop, Cameroon, possibly Sierra Leone)
- Falcuna campimus dilatata (Schultze, 1923) (southern Cameroon, Gabon)

Torben Larsen developed a species numbering system for his 2005 publication Butterflies of West Africa. The nominate subspecies is #252. The 'Larsen' numbers have since been used with permission in A Sharp Eye on Butterflies of Ghana.
