= Falcuna melandeta =

Scientific classification
- Domain: Eukaryota
- Kingdom: Animalia
- Phylum: Arthropoda
- Class: Insecta
- Order: Lepidoptera
- Family: Lycaenidae
- Genus: Falcuna
- Species: F. melandeta

Binomial name
- Falcuna melandeta (Holland, 1893)

Synonyms
- Larinopoda melandeta Holland, 1893

Species of butterfly

Falcuna melandeta is a butterfly in the family Lycaenidae. It is found in Gabon. The habitat consists of primary forests.
