= Oxylides binza =

Scientific classification
- Kingdom: Animalia
- Phylum: Arthropoda
- Class: Insecta
- Order: Lepidoptera
- Family: Lycaenidae
- Genus: Oxylides
- Species: O. binza

Binomial name
- Oxylides binza Berger, 1981

Synonyms
- Oxylides faunus binza Berger, 1981; Oxylides faunus ab. coerulescens Aurivillius, 1923

Species of butterfly

Oxylides binza is a butterfly in the family Lycaenidae. It is found in the Democratic Republic of the Congo (Kinshasa).

== Images ==
External images from Royal Museum of Central Africa.
