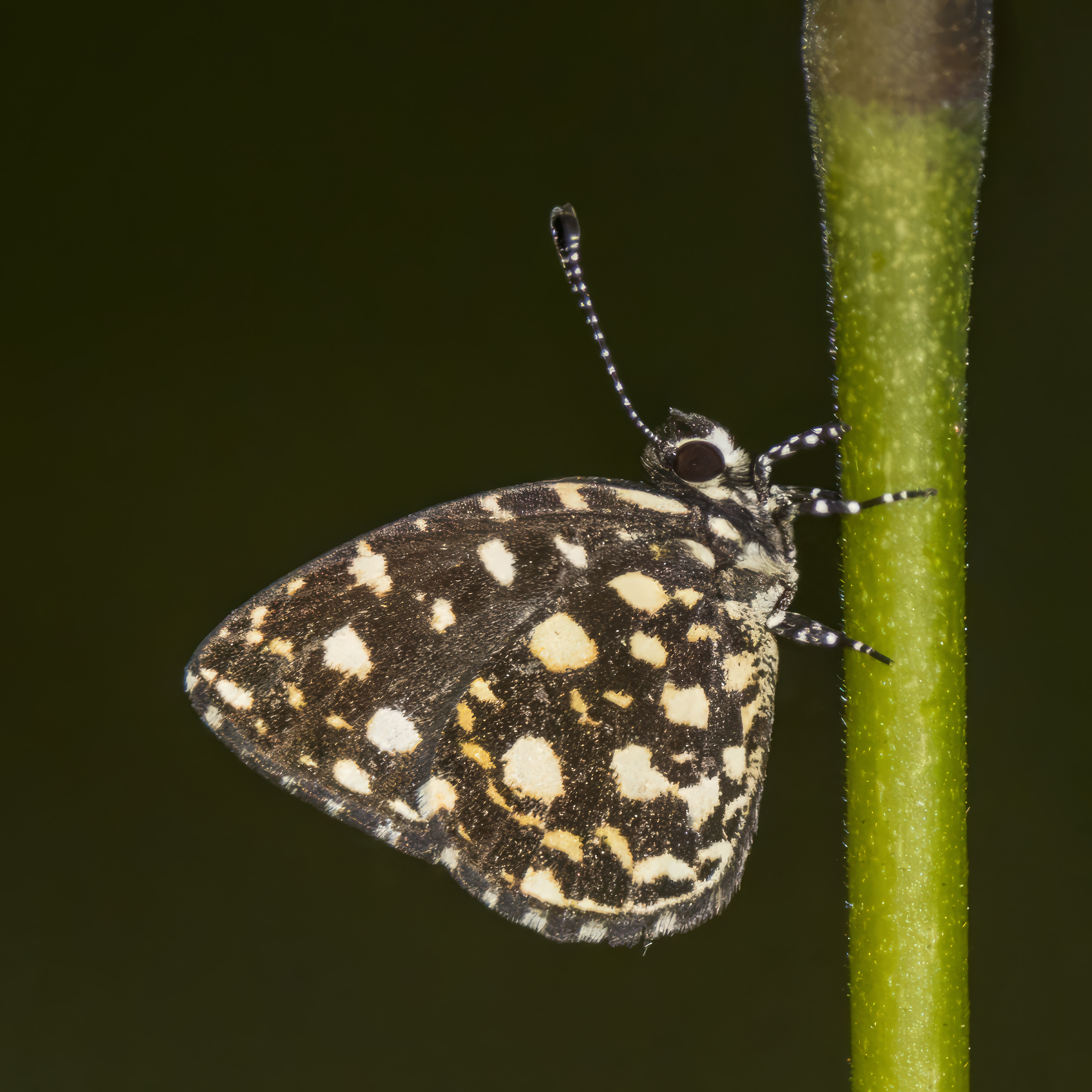
- M. adelgitha

Scientific classification
- Domain: Eukaryota
- Kingdom: Animalia
- Phylum: Arthropoda
- Class: Insecta
- Order: Lepidoptera
- Family: Lycaenidae
- Subfamily: Poritiinae
- Genus: Micropentila; Aurivillius, 1895

= Micropentila =

Butterfly genus in family Lycaenidae

Micropentila is a genus of butterflies in the family Lycaenidae, endemic to the Afrotropics.

== Species ==
- Micropentila adelgitha (Hewitson, 1874)
- Micropentila adelgunda (Staudinger, 1892)
- Micropentila alberta (Staudinger, 1892)
- Micropentila bakotae Stempffer & Bennett, 1965
- Micropentila bitjeana Stempffer & Bennett, 1965
- Micropentila brunnea (Kirby, 1887)
- Micropentila bunyoro Stempffer & Bennett, 1965
- Micropentila catocala Strand, 1914
- Micropentila cherereti Stempffer & Bennett, 1965
- Micropentila cingulum Druce, 1910
- Micropentila dorothea Bethune-Baker, 1903
- Micropentila flavopunctata Stempffer & Bennett, 1965
- Micropentila fontainei Stempffer & Bennett, 1965
- Micropentila fulvula Hawker-Smith, 1933
- Micropentila fuscula (Grose-Smith, 1898)
- Micropentila gabunica Stempffer & Bennett, 1965
- Micropentila galenides (Holland, 1895)
- Micropentila jacksoni Talbot, 1937
- Micropentila katangana Stempffer & Bennett, 1965
- Micropentila katerae Stempffer & Bennett, 1965
- Micropentila kelleana Stempffer & Bennett, 1965
- Micropentila mabangi Bethune-Baker, 1904
- Micropentila mamfe Larsen, 1986
- Micropentila mpigi Stempffer & Bennett, 1965
- Micropentila nigeriana Stempffer & Bennett, 1965
- Micropentila ogojae Stempffer & Bennett, 1965
- Micropentila sankuru Stempffer & Bennett, 1965
- Micropentila souanke Stempffer & Bennett, 1965
- Micropentila subplagata Bethune-Baker, 1915
- Micropentila triangularis Aurivillius, 1895
- Micropentila ugandae Hawker-Smith, 1933
- Micropentila victoriae Stempffer & Bennett, 1965
- Micropentila villiersi Stempffer, 1970
