= Eresina schmitti =

Scientific classification
- Domain: Eukaryota
- Kingdom: Animalia
- Phylum: Arthropoda
- Class: Insecta
- Order: Lepidoptera
- Family: Lycaenidae
- Genus: Eresina
- Species: E. schmitti

Binomial name
- Eresina schmitti Larsen, 2005

Species of butterfly

Eresina schmitti, the Schmitt's eresina, is a butterfly in the family Lycaenidae. It is found in eastern Nigeria.
