= Eresina bilinea =

Scientific classification
- Domain: Eukaryota
- Kingdom: Animalia
- Phylum: Arthropoda
- Class: Insecta
- Order: Lepidoptera
- Family: Lycaenidae
- Genus: Eresina
- Species: E. bilinea

Binomial name
- Eresina bilinea Talbot, 1935

Species of butterfly

Eresina bilinea is a butterfly in the family Lycaenidae. It is found in north-western Tanzania, western Kenya, Uganda, the north-eastern part of the Democratic Republic of the Congo and Zambia. Its habitat consists of dense, primary forests.
