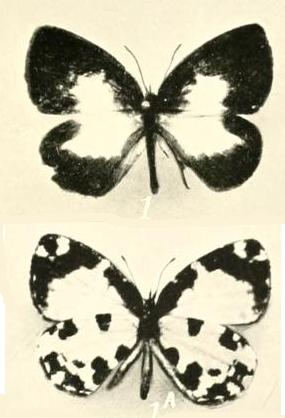

Scientific classification
- Domain: Eukaryota
- Kingdom: Animalia
- Phylum: Arthropoda
- Class: Insecta
- Order: Lepidoptera
- Family: Lycaenidae
- Genus: Falcuna
- Species: F. margarita

Binomial name
- Falcuna margarita (Suffert, 1904)

Synonyms
- Liptena margarita Suffert, 1904; Liptena libyssa var. latemarginata Schultze, 1917

= Falcuna margarita =

Species of butterfly

Falcuna margarita is a butterfly in the family Lycaenidae. It is found in Cameroon, the Republic of the Congo, Gabon and the Democratic Republic of the Congo (Ituri and Shaba). The habitat consists of primary forests.
