= Epitoxis duplicata =

Scientific classification
- Kingdom: Animalia
- Phylum: Arthropoda
- Class: Insecta
- Order: Lepidoptera
- Superfamily: Noctuoidea
- Family: Erebidae
- Subfamily: Arctiinae
- Genus: Epitoxis
- Species: E. duplicata

Binomial name
- Epitoxis duplicata Gaede, 1926

Species of moth

Epitoxis duplicata is a moth of the subfamily Arctiinae. It was described by Max Gaede in 1926. It is found in Tanzania.
