= Epitoxis nigra =

Scientific classification
- Kingdom: Animalia
- Phylum: Arthropoda
- Class: Insecta
- Order: Lepidoptera
- Superfamily: Noctuoidea
- Family: Erebidae
- Subfamily: Arctiinae
- Genus: Epitoxis
- Species: E. nigra

Binomial name
- Epitoxis nigra Hampson, 1903

Species of moth

Epitoxis nigra is a moth of the subfamily Arctiinae. It was described by George Hampson in 1903. It is found in Mozambique, South Africa, Uganda and Zimbabwe.
