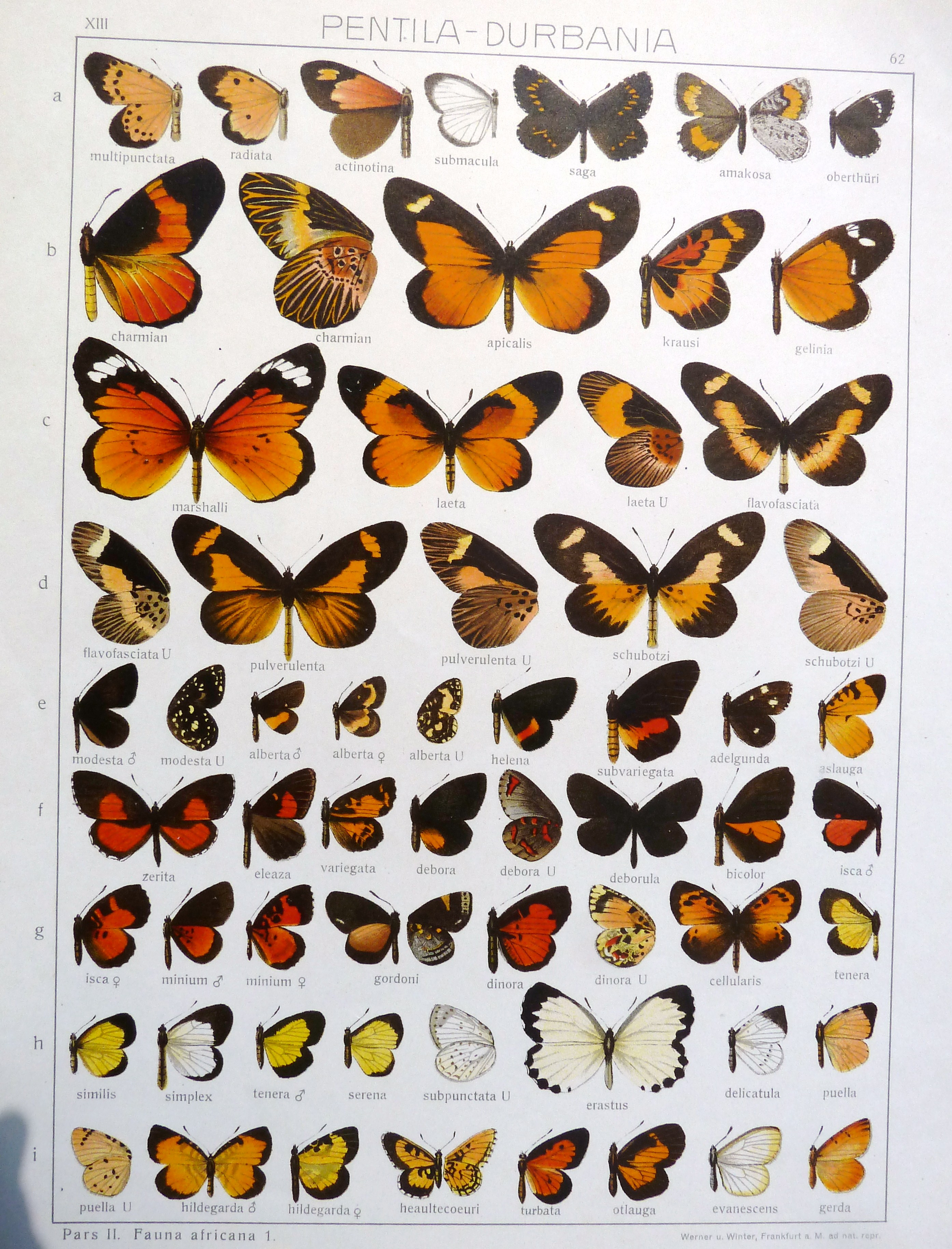
- In Adalbert Seitz's Fauna Africana

Scientific classification
- Kingdom: Animalia
- Phylum: Arthropoda
- Class: Insecta
- Order: Lepidoptera
- Family: Lycaenidae
- Genus: Micropentila
- Species: M. alberta

Binomial name
- Micropentila alberta (Staudinger, 1892)

Synonyms
- Teriomima alberta Staudinger, 1892

= Micropentila alberta =

Species of butterfly

Micropentila alberta is a butterfly in the family Lycaenidae. It is found in Gabon and a bit of the western parts of the Republic of the Congo. The habitat consists of primary forests.
