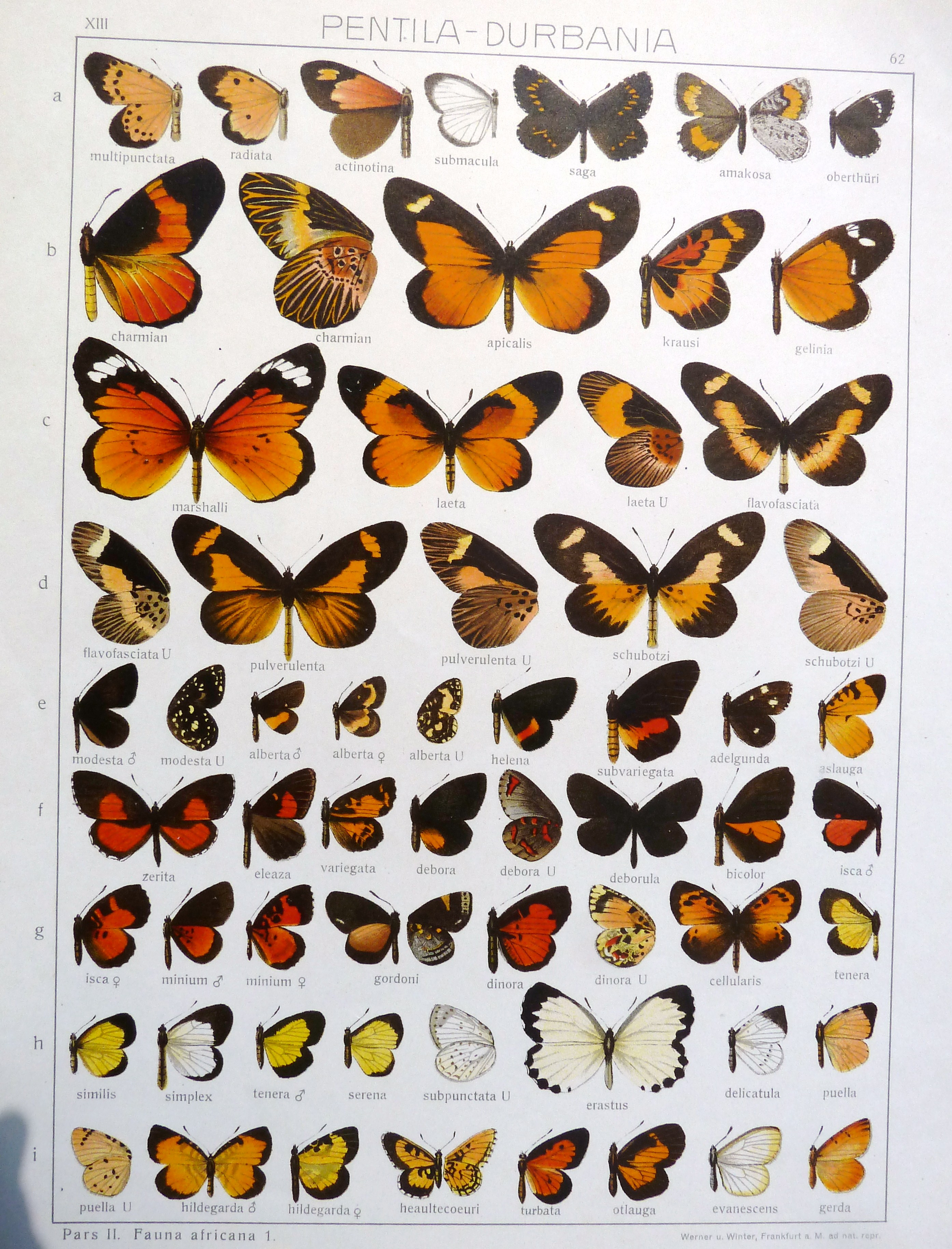
- In Adalbert Seitz's Fauna Africana

Scientific classification
- Domain: Eukaryota
- Kingdom: Animalia
- Phylum: Arthropoda
- Class: Insecta
- Order: Lepidoptera
- Family: Lycaenidae
- Genus: Micropentila
- Species: M. adelgunda

Binomial name
- Micropentila adelgunda (Staudinger, 1892)

Synonyms
- Teriomima adelgunda Staudinger, 1892

= Micropentila adelgunda =

Species of butterfly

Micropentila adelgunda, the large dots, is a butterfly in the family Lycaenidae. It is found in Ghana, Nigeria, Cameroon and possibly Gabon and the Democratic Republic of the Congo (Kinshasa). The habitat consists of primary forests.
