= Eresina toroensis =

Scientific classification
- Domain: Eukaryota
- Kingdom: Animalia
- Phylum: Arthropoda
- Class: Insecta
- Order: Lepidoptera
- Family: Lycaenidae
- Genus: Eresina
- Species: E. toroensis

Binomial name
- Eresina toroensis Joicey & Talbot, 1921

Species of butterfly

Eresina toroensis is a butterfly in the family Lycaenidae. It is found in Uganda, the Democratic Republic of the Congo (Ituri, North Kivu and Lualaba), Kenya and Zambia. Its habitat consists of dense, primary forests.
