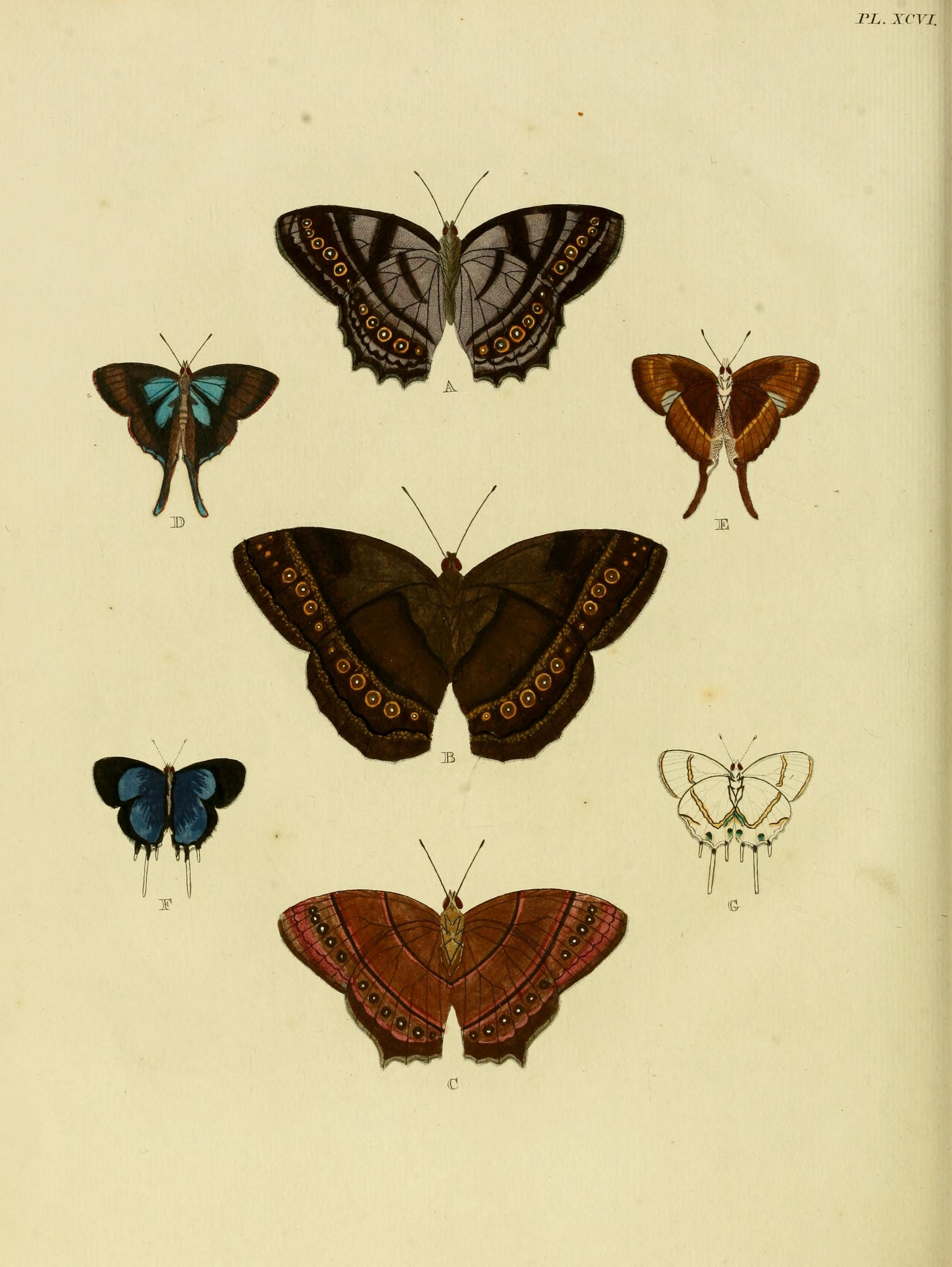
- Oxylides faunus in Cramer by Caspar Stoll in Uitlandsche kapellen (f, g as "Papilio faunus")

Scientific classification
- Domain: Eukaryota
- Kingdom: Animalia
- Phylum: Arthropoda
- Class: Insecta
- Order: Lepidoptera
- Family: Lycaenidae
- Tribe: Theclini
- Genus: Oxylides; Hübner, [1819]

= Oxylides =

Butterfly genus in family Lycaenidae

Oxylides is a genus of butterflies in the family Lycaenidae. The members are Afrotropical. The genus was erected by Jacob Hübner c. 1819

== Species ==
- Oxylides albata (Aurivillius, 1895)
- Oxylides bella Aurivillius, 1899
- Oxylides binza Berger, 1981
- Oxylides faunus (Drury, [1773])
- Oxylides feminina (Sharpe, 1904)
- Oxylides gloveri Hawker-Smith, 1929
- Oxylides stempfferi Berger, 1981
