= Epitoxis =

Scientific classification
- Kingdom: Animalia
- Phylum: Arthropoda
- Class: Insecta
- Order: Lepidoptera
- Superfamily: Noctuoidea
- Family: Erebidae
- Subfamily: Arctiinae
- Genus: Epitoxis; Wallengren, 1863

Synonyms
- Syntomerea Strand, 1912

Genus of moths

Epitoxis is a genus of moths in the subfamily Arctiinae. The genus was described by Wallengren in 1863.

== Species ==
- Epitoxis albicincta Hampson, 1903
- Epitoxis amazoula Boisduval, 1847
- Epitoxis ansorgei Rothschild, 1910
- Epitoxis borguensis Hampson, 1901
- Epitoxis ceryxoides Berio, 1941
- Epitoxis duplicata Gaede, 1926
- Epitoxis erythroderma Aurivillius, 1925
- Epitoxis myopsychoides Strand, 1912
- Epitoxis namaqua de Freina & Mey, 2011
- Epitoxis nigra Hampson, 1903
- Epitoxis procridia Hampson, 1898
- Epitoxis stempfferi Kiriakoff, 1953
