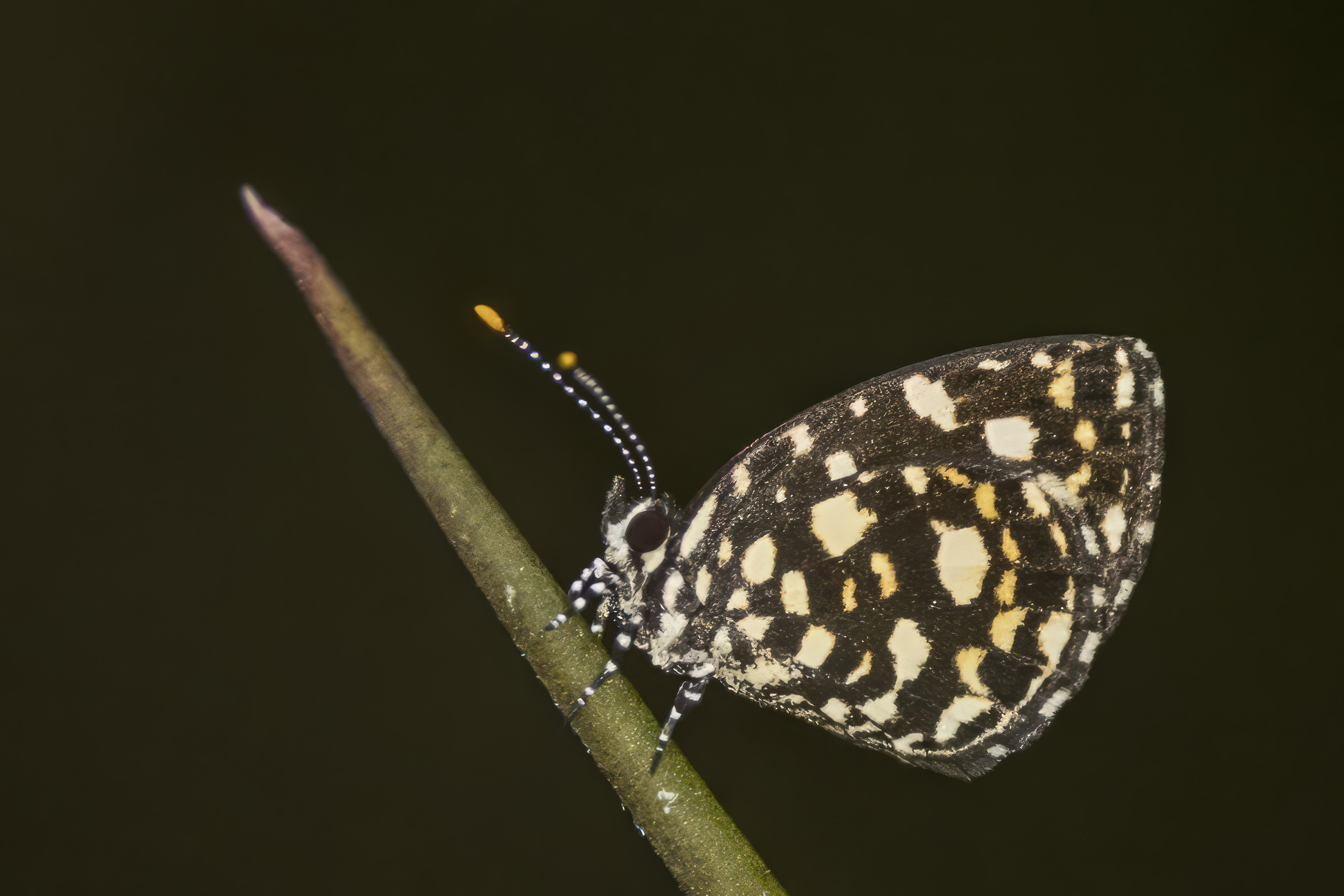
- In Ghana
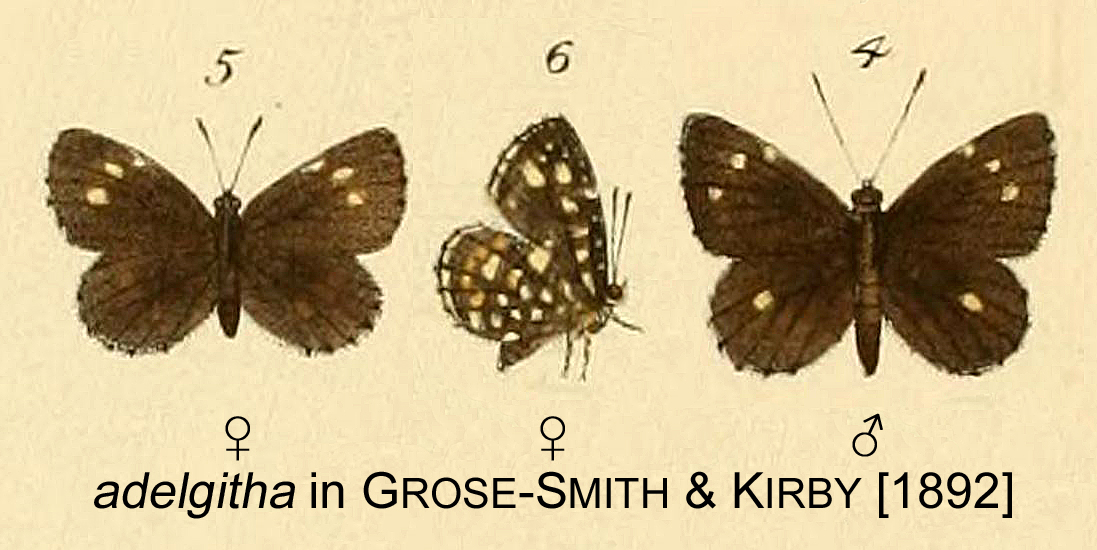

Scientific classification
- Kingdom: Animalia
- Phylum: Arthropoda
- Clade: Pancrustacea
- Class: Insecta
- Order: Lepidoptera
- Family: Lycaenidae
- Genus: Micropentila
- Species: M. adelgitha

Binomial name
- Micropentila adelgitha (Hewitson, 1874)

Synonyms
- Liptena adelgitha Hewitson, 1874; Lycaena moneta Mabille, 1890

= Micropentila adelgitha =

Species of butterfly

Micropentila adelgitha, the common dots, is a butterfly in the family Lycaenidae. It is found in Ivory Coast, Ghana, Nigeria (south and the Cross River loop), Cameroon, Gabon, the Republic of the Congo and the Democratic Republic of the Congo (Ituri). The habitat consists of primary forests.

Adults feed from extrafloral nectaries of Marantaceae species.

Torben Larsen developed a species numbering system for his 2005 publication Butterflies of West Africa. This species is #266. The 'Larsen' numbers have since been used with permission in A Sharp Eye on Butterflies of Ghana.
