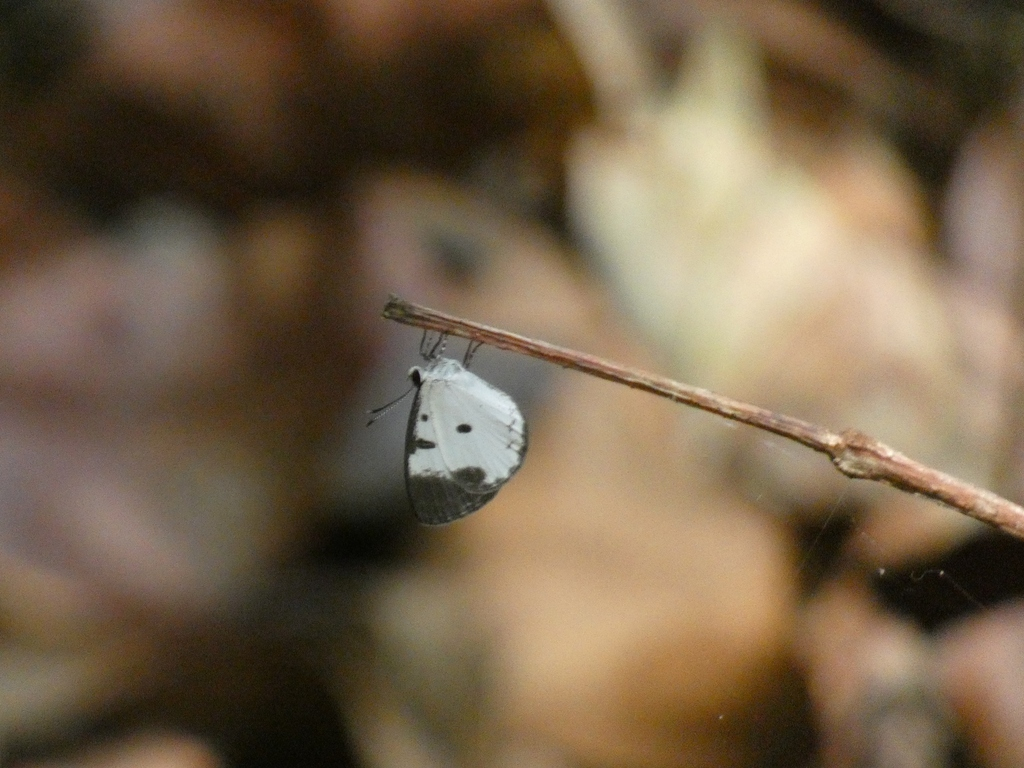

Scientific classification
- Kingdom: Animalia
- Phylum: Arthropoda
- Class: Insecta
- Order: Lepidoptera
- Family: Lycaenidae
- Genus: Tetrarhanis
- Species: T. stempfferi

Binomial name
- Tetrarhanis stempfferi (Berger, 1954)

Synonyms
- Liptena (Tetrarhanis) stempfferi Berger, 1954; Liptena (Tetrarhanis) stempfferi kigezi Stempffer, 1956

= Tetrarhanis stempfferi =

Species of butterfly

Tetrarhanis stempfferi, the Stempffer's on-off, is a butterfly in the family Lycaenidae. The species is named after French entomologist Henri Stempffer. It is found in Liberia, Ghana, Nigeria, Cameroon, the Republic of the Congo, the Central African Republic, the Democratic Republic of the Congo, Uganda and Kenya. The habitat consists of primary forests.

== Subspecies ==
- Tetrarhanis stempfferi stempfferi (Liberia, Ghana, southern Nigeria, Cameroon, Congo, Central African Republic, Democratic Republic of Congo: Uele, Tshopo, Sankuru and Lualaba)
- Tetrarhanis stempfferi kigezi (Stempffer, 1956) (Uganda: south-west to the Kigezi district, western Kenya)
