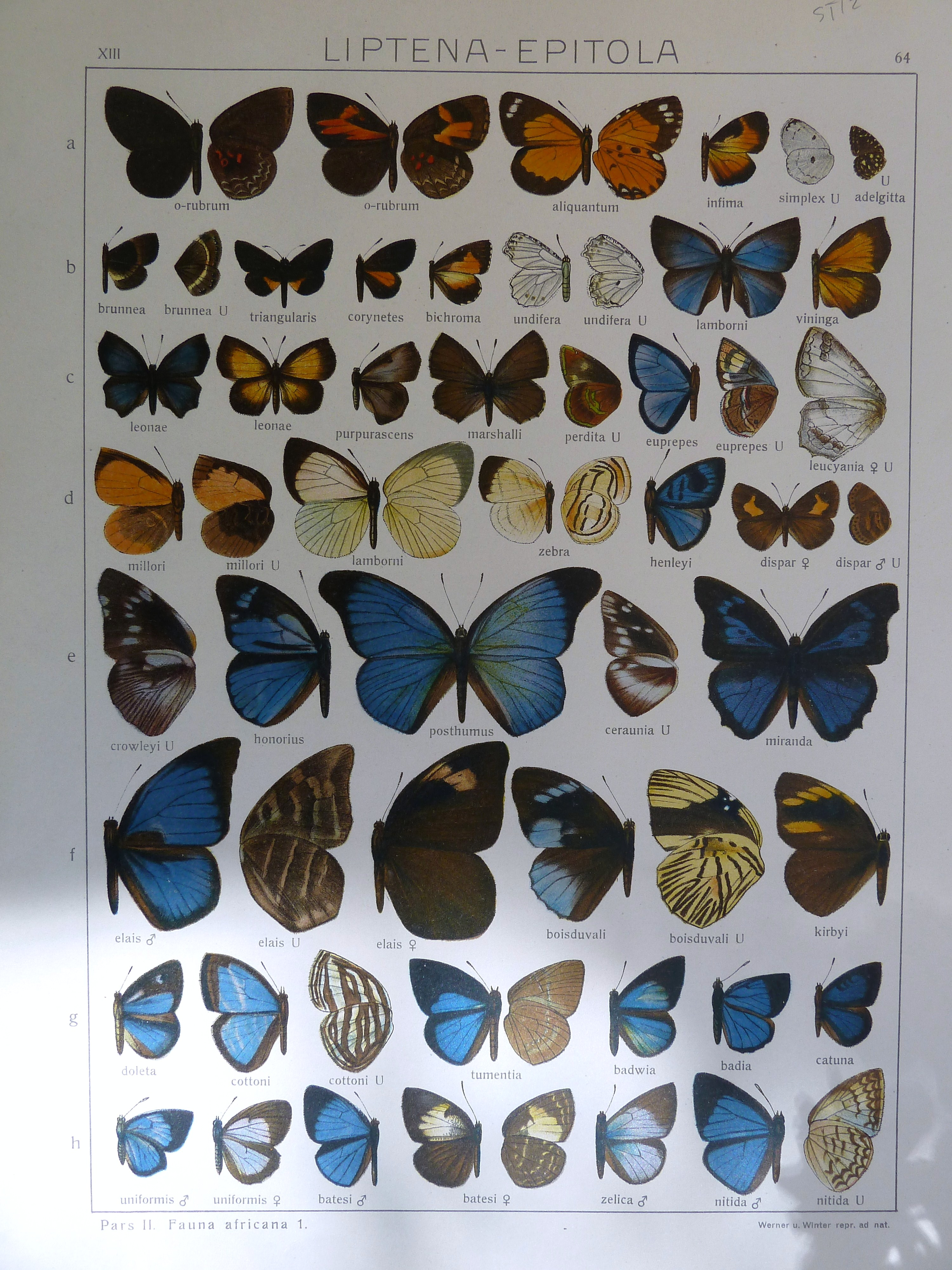
- in Seitz a

Scientific classification
- Kingdom: Animalia
- Phylum: Arthropoda
- Class: Insecta
- Order: Lepidoptera
- Family: Lycaenidae
- Genus: Tetrarhanis
- Species: T. simplex

Binomial name
- Tetrarhanis simplex (Aurivillius, 1895)

Synonyms
- Liptena ilma var. simplex Aurivillius, 1895

= Tetrarhanis simplex =

Species of butterfly

Tetrarhanis simplex, the simple on-off, is a butterfly in the family Lycaenidae. It is found in Nigeria (east and the Cross River loop), Cameroon and the Republic of the Congo. The habitat consists of primary forests.
