= Micropentila dorothea =

Scientific classification
- Domain: Eukaryota
- Kingdom: Animalia
- Phylum: Arthropoda
- Class: Insecta
- Order: Lepidoptera
- Family: Lycaenidae
- Genus: Micropentila
- Species: M. dorothea

Binomial name
- Micropentila dorothea Bethune-Baker, 1903

Species of butterfly

Micropentila dorothea, the Dorothea's dots, is a butterfly in the family Lycaenidae. It is found in Sierra Leone, Liberia, Ivory Coast, Ghana, Nigeria (south and the Cross River loop), Cameroon, Gabon and the western part of the Democratic Republic of the Congo. The habitat consists of primary forests.
