= Oxylides feminina =

Scientific classification
- Kingdom: Animalia
- Phylum: Arthropoda
- Class: Insecta
- Order: Lepidoptera
- Family: Lycaenidae
- Genus: Oxylides
- Species: O. feminina

Binomial name
- Oxylides feminina (Sharpe, 1904)

Synonyms
- Hypolycaena faunus var. feminina Sharpe, 1904

Species of butterfly

Oxylides feminina is a butterfly in the family Lycaenidae. It is found in Uganda, the Democratic Republic of the Congo (Sankuru, Lualaba, Shaba, Maniema and Kivu) and north-western Zambia.

== Images ==
External images from Royal Museum of Central Africa.
