= Epitoxis stempfferi =

Scientific classification
- Kingdom: Animalia
- Phylum: Arthropoda
- Class: Insecta
- Order: Lepidoptera
- Superfamily: Noctuoidea
- Family: Erebidae
- Subfamily: Arctiinae
- Genus: Epitoxis
- Species: E. stempfferi

Binomial name
- Epitoxis stempfferi Kiriakoff, 1953

Species of moth

Epitoxis stempfferi is a moth of the subfamily Arctiinae. It was described by Sergius G. Kiriakoff in 1953. It is found in the Democratic Republic of the Congo.
