= Oxylides stempfferi =

Scientific classification
- Kingdom: Animalia
- Phylum: Arthropoda
- Class: Insecta
- Order: Lepidoptera
- Family: Lycaenidae
- Genus: Oxylides
- Species: O. stempfferi

Binomial name
- Oxylides stempfferi Berger, 1981

Synonyms
- Oxylides faunus stempfferi Berger, 1981

Species of butterfly

Oxylides stempfferi is a butterfly in the family Lycaenidae. It is found in the Democratic Republic of the Congo.

== Images ==
External images from Royal Museum of Central Africa.
