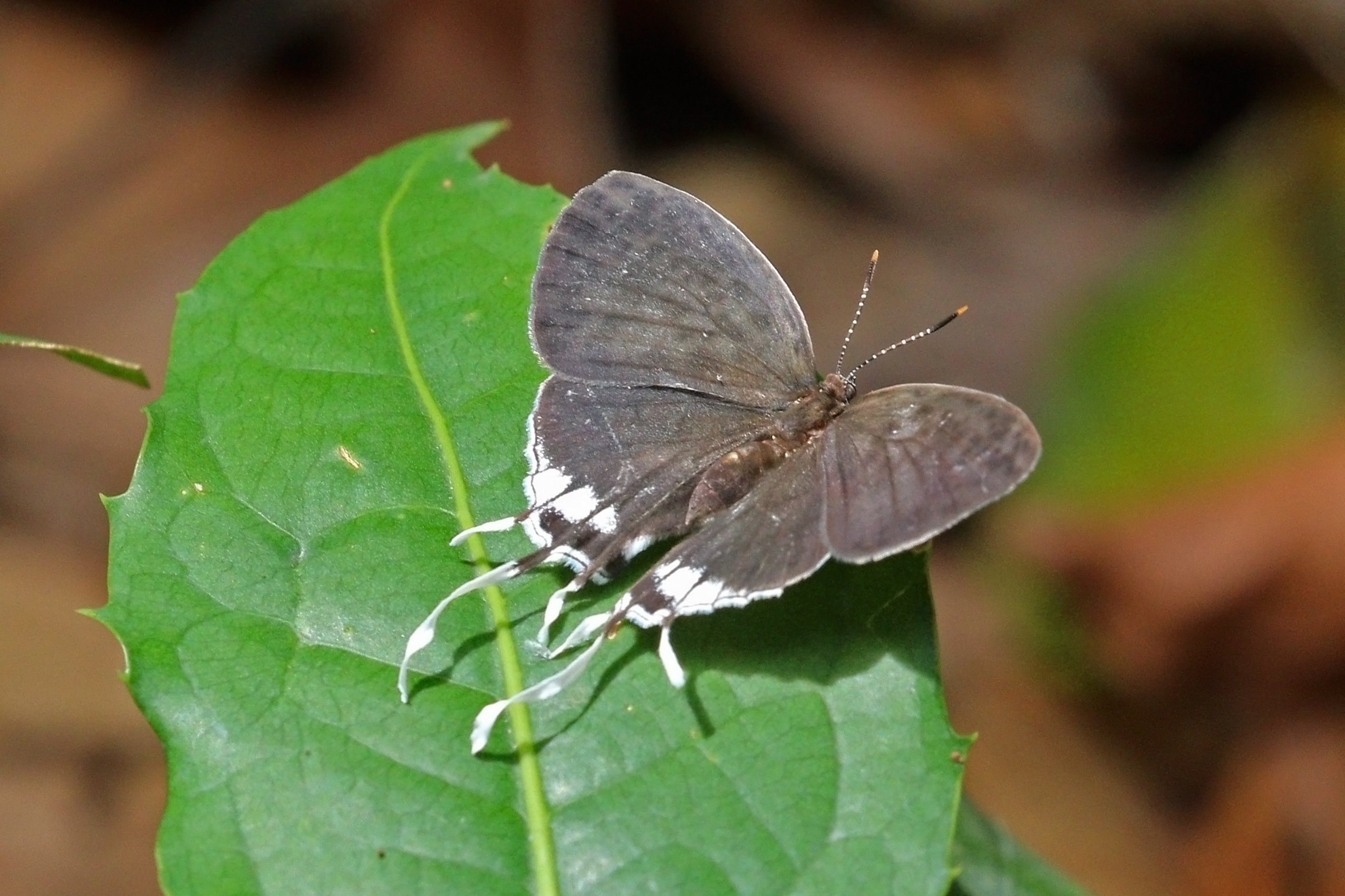

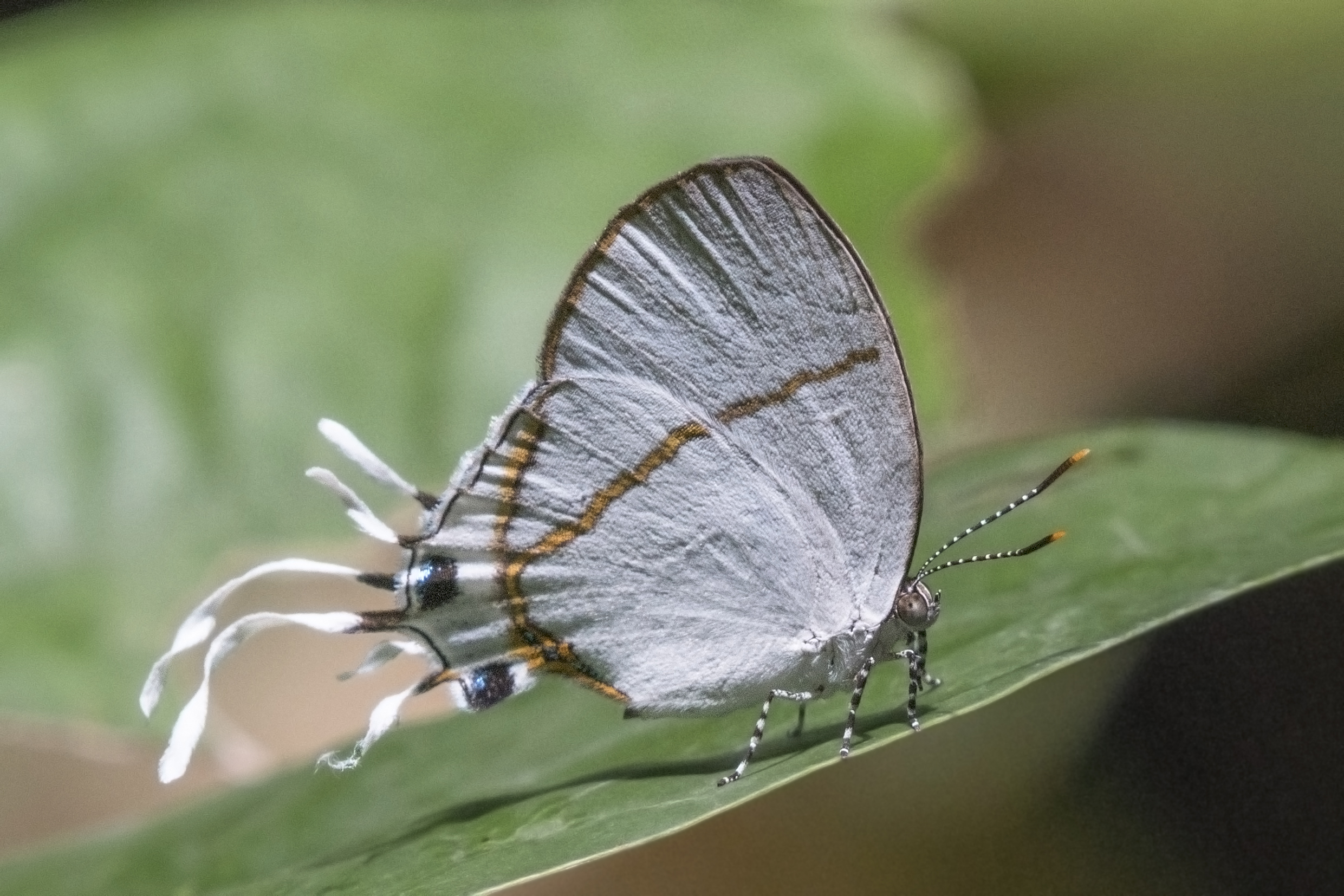
- both females Kakum National Park, Ghana

Scientific classification
- Kingdom: Animalia
- Phylum: Arthropoda
- Clade: Pancrustacea
- Class: Insecta
- Order: Lepidoptera
- Family: Lycaenidae
- Genus: Oxylides
- Species: O. faunus

Binomial name
- Oxylides faunus (Drury, 1773)

Synonyms
- Papilio faunus Drury, 1773; Hesperia hesiodus Fabricius, 1793

= Oxylides faunus =

Species of butterfly

Oxylides faunus, the common false head, is a butterfly in the family Lycaenidae. It is found in Guinea-Bissau, Guinea, Sierra Leone, Liberia, Ivory Coast, Ghana, Togo, Nigeria and Cameroon. The habitat consists of primary forests.

Both sexes are attracted to flowers.

== Images ==
External images from Royal Museum of Central Africa.

== Subspecies ==
- Oxylides faunus faunus (Guinea-Bissau, Guinea, Sierra Leone, Liberia, Ivory Coast, Ghana, Togo, Nigeria)
- Oxylides faunus camerunica Libert, 2004 (Nigeria: Cross River loop, Cameroon)

Torben Larsen developed a species numbering system for his 2005 publication Butterflies of West Africa. The nominate subspecies is #356. The 'Larsen' numbers have since been used with permission in A Sharp Eye on Butterflies of Ghana.
