= Henri Stempffer =

French entomologist (1894–1978)

Henri Stempffer (23 January 1894 – 1 November 1978) was a French entomologist who specialized in the study of Lycaenidae butterflies.

== Biography ==
Stempffer was born on 23 January 1894 in Paris, at 19 rue de Charonne.

In 1922, he became a member of the French Entomological Society (of which he would be elected president in 1943) and subscribed to the entomological publication of Léon Lhomme, L'Amateur de papillons.

He then was working at the Banque de France (living at 32, rue Théodore-Honoré at Nogent-sur-Marne, Seine).

In 1954 he became a fellow of the Royal Entomological Society of London.

He specialized in the study of Lycaenidae and became a specialist publishing his work in both French and English. In 1967 he wrote a major review of the African species (Genera of the African Lycaenidae. Bulletin of the British Museum (Natural History), Entomology, Supplement 10: 1-322.) In 1973 he received the Karl Jordan Medal of the Lepidopterists' Society.

In 1977 he donated his collection to the entomology laboratory of the National Museum of Natural History of Paris.

Although he was a specialist of the African fauna, he had never been in Africa, but he visited many countries as Italy, Greece, and Yugoslavia. In 1972, at the invitation of Torben B. Larsen, he visited Lebanon.

During the Second World War he was part of the resistance movement and received the Ordre de la Libération in 1944.

Stempffer died on 1 November 1978 in Paris, at 4 rue Saint-Antoine.

== Works ==
He wrote about 90 publications. The complete list has never been published. Apart from his huge monograph already cited, he published many works in many different journals such as:

- Contribution à l'étude des Lycaenidae de l'Afrique équatoriale, 1953-1961.
- Contribution à l'étude des Lycaenidae de la faune éthiopienne, 1942-1969.
- Les Lépidoptères de l'Afrique Noire Française. 3. Lycaenidae, 1957.

See also list of publications on WikiSpecies.

== List of taxa described ==
He named about 200 new taxa, the complete list has never been published.

== Species named after Henri Stempffer ==
- Agrilus stempfferi Descarpentries & Villiers, 1963
- Anthene stempfferi Storace 1954
- Calophasia stempfferi Boursin 1929
- Castalius stempfferi Kielland 1976
- Cerautola stempfferi Jackson 1962
- Epitola stempfferi Jackson 1962
- Epitoxis stempfferi Kiriakoff 1954
- Liptena stempfferi Berger, 1954
- Lycaena stempfferi Brandt 1958
- Ornipholidotos stempfferi Collins & Larsen 2000
- Oxylides faunus stempfferi Berger 1981
- Polyommatus stempfferi Brandt 1938
- Spalgis jacksoni stempfferi Kielland 1985
- Tetrarhanis stempfferi Berger 1954
- Tuxentius stempfferi Kielland 1976
