= List of butterflies of Tanzania =

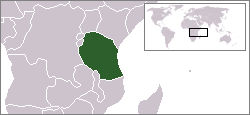
Location of Tanzania

This is a list of butterflies of Tanzania. About 1,583 species are known from Tanzania, 134 of which are endemic.

== Papilionidae ==
=== Papilioninae ===
==== Papilionini ====
- Papilio nireus nireus Linnaeus, 1758
- Papilio nireus lyaeus Doubleday, 1845
- Papilio chrapkowskoides Storace, 1952
- Papilio desmondi magdae Gifford, 1961
- Papilio desmondi usambaraensis (Koçak, 1980)
- Papilio hornimani hornimani Distant, 1879
- Papilio hornimani mbulu Kielland, 1990
- Papilio hornimani mwanihanae Kielland, 1987
- Papilio sosia debilis Storace, 1951
- Papilio thuraui thuraui Karsch, 1900
- Papilio thuraui cyclopis Rothschild & Jordan, 1903
- Papilio thuraui ngorongoro (Hancock, 1984)
- Papilio ufipa Carcasson, 1961 (endemic)
- Papilio cynorta Fabricius, 1793
- Papilio dardanus meseres Carpenter, 1948
- Papilio dardanus tibullus Kirby, 1880
- Papilio constantinus constantinus Ward, 1871
- Papilio constantinus mweruanus Joicey & Talbot, 1927
- Papilio phorcas ansorgei Rothschild, 1896
- Papilio phorcas congoanus Rothschild, 1896
- Papilio phorcas nyikanus Rothschild & Jordan, 1903
- Papilio phorcas tenuifasciatus Kielland, 1990
- Papilio rex rex Oberthür, 1886
- Papilio rex mimeticus Rothschild, 1897
- Papilio demodocus Esper, [1798]
- Papilio echerioides ambangulu Clifton & Collins, 1997
- Papilio echerioides homeyeri Plötz, 1880
- Papilio echerioides joiceyi Gabriel, 1945
- Papilio echerioides kiellandi Clifton & Collins, 1997
- Papilio echerioides pseudowertheri Kielland, 1990
- Papilio echerioides wertheri Karsch, 1898
- Papilio fuelleborni fuelleborni Karsch, 1900
- Papilio fuelleborni neocesa Kemal & Kocak, 2005
- Papilio fuelleborni rydoni Kielland, 1987
- Papilio fuelleborni sjoestedti Aurivillius, 1908
- Papilio jacksoni kungwe Cottrell, 1963
- Papilio nobilis nobilis Rogenhofer, 1891
- Papilio nobilis crippsianus Stoneham, 1936
- Papilio nobilis mpanda Kielland, 1990
- Papilio hesperus Westwood, 1843
- Papilio pelodurus vesper Le Cerf, 1924
- Papilio lormieri semlikana Le Cerf, 1924
- Papilio ophidicephalus ophidicephalus Oberthür, 1878
- Papilio ophidicephalus mkuwadzi Gifford, 1961
- Papilio mackinnoni mackinnoni Sharpe, 1891
- Papilio mackinnoni isokae (Hancock, 1984)
- Papilio mackinnoni mpwapwana Kielland, 1990
- Papilio mackinnoni reductofascia Kielland, 1990

==== Leptocercini ====
- Graphium antheus (Cramer, 1779)
- Graphium policenes (Cramer, 1775)
- Graphium kirbyi (Hewitson, 1872)
- Graphium junodi (Trimen, 1893)
- Graphium polistratus (Grose-Smith, 1889)
- Graphium colonna (Ward, 1873)
- Graphium illyris hamatus (Joicey & Talbot, 1918)
- Graphium porthaon porthaon (Hewitson, 1865)
- Graphium porthaon tanganyikae Kielland, 1978
- Graphium angolanus angolanus (Goeze, 1779)
- Graphium angolanus baronis (Ungemach, 1932)
- Graphium taboranus (Oberthür, 1886)
- Graphium ridleyanus (White, 1843)
- Graphium leonidas leonidas (Fabricius, 1793)
- Graphium leonidas pelopidas (Oberthür, 1879)
- Graphium tynderaeus (Fabricius, 1793)
- Graphium latreillianus theorini (Aurivillius, 1881)
- Graphium philonoe (Ward, 1873)
- Graphium almansor uganda (Lathy, 1906)
- Graphium kigoma Carcasson, 1964 (endemic)
- Graphium ucalegon schoutedeni Berger, 1950

== Pieridae ==
=== Coliadinae ===
- Eurema brigitta (Stoll, [1780])
- Eurema mandarinula (Holland, 1892)
- Eurema floricola floricola (Boisduval, 1833)
- Eurema floricola leonis (Butler, 1886)
- Eurema hapale (Mabille, 1882)
- Eurema hecabe solifera (Butler, 1875)
- Eurema senegalensis (Boisduval, 1836)
- Catopsilia florella (Fabricius, 1775)
- Colias electo pseudohecate Berger, 1940

=== Pierinae ===
- Colotis antevippe gavisa (Wallengren, 1857)
- Colotis aurigineus (Butler, 1883)
- Colotis aurora evarne (Klug, 1829)
- Colotis auxo (Lucas, 1852)
- Colotis celimene (Lucas, 1852)
- Colotis chrysonome (Klug, 1829)
- Colotis daira jacksoni (Sharpe, 1890)
- Colotis danae pseudacaste (Butler, 1876)
- Colotis dissociatus (Butler, 1897)
- Colotis elgonensis elgonensis (Sharpe, 1891)
- Colotis elgonensis nobilis Carcasson, 1961
- Colotis euippe complexivus (Butler, 1886)
- Colotis euippe omphale (Godart, 1819)
- Colotis eunoma flotowi (Suffert, 1904)
- Colotis evenina casta (Gerstaecker, 1871)
- Colotis evenina sipylus (Swinhoe, 1884)
- Colotis evenina xantholeuca (Sharpe, 1904)
- Colotis halimede australis Talbot, 1939
- Colotis hetaera hetaera (Gerstaecker, 1871)
- Colotis hetaera ankolensis Stoneham, 1940
- Colotis hildebrandtii (Staudinger, 1884)
- Colotis incretus (Butler, 1881)
- Colotis ione (Godart, 1819)
- Colotis pallene (Hopffer, 1855)
- Colotis protomedia (Klug, 1829)
- Colotis regina (Trimen, 1863)
- Colotis venosa (Staudinger, 1885)
- Colotis vesta catachrysops (Butler, 1878)
- Colotis vesta hanningtoni (Butler, 1883)
- Colotis vesta kagera Congdon, Kielland & Collins, 1998
- Colotis vesta rhodesinus (Butler, 1894)
- Colotis vestalis castalis (Staudinger, 1884)
- Colotis subfasciatus ducissa (Dognin, 1891)
- Eronia cleodora cleodora Hübner, 1823
- Eronia cleodora dilatata Butler, 1888
- Pinacopterix eriphia eriphia (Godart, [1819])
- Pinacopterix eriphia melanarge (Butler, 1886)
- Pinacopterix eriphia wittei Berger, 1940
- Nepheronia argia argolisia (Stoneham, 1957)
- Nepheronia argia mhondana (Suffert, 1904)
- Nepheronia buquetii (Boisduval, 1836)
- Nepheronia pharis silvanus (Stoneham, 1957)
- Nepheronia thalassina sinalata (Suffert, 1904)
- Leptosia alcesta inalcesta Bernardi, 1959
- Leptosia hybrida somereni Bernardi, 1959
- Leptosia marginea (Mabille, 1890)
- Leptosia nupta pseudonupta Bernardi, 1959
- Leptosia wigginsi (Dixey, 1915)

==== Pierini ====
- Appias epaphia contracta (Butler, 1888)
- Appias lasti (Grose-Smith, 1889)
- Appias phaola intermedia Dufrane, 1948
- Appias phaola isokani (Grose-Smith, 1889)
- Appias sabina sabina (Felder & Felder, [1865])
- Appias sabina phoebe (Butler, 1901)
- Appias sylvia nyasana (Butler, 1897)
- Pieris brassicoides marghanita Hemming, 1941
- Pontia distorta (Butler, 1886)
- Pontia helice johnstonii (Crowley, 1887)
- Mylothris agathina (Cramer, 1779)
- Mylothris asphodelus Butler, 1888
- Mylothris basalis Aurivillius, 1906
- Mylothris chloris (Fabricius, 1775)
- Mylothris citrina Aurivillius, 1898
- Mylothris continua Talbot, 1944
- Mylothris crawshayi bunduki Berger, 1980
- Mylothris ertli Suffert, 1904 (endemic)
- Mylothris flaviana interposita Joicey & Talbot, 1921
- Mylothris jacksoni Sharpe, 1891
- Mylothris kiellandi Berger, 1985 (endemic)
- Mylothris kilimensis kilimensis Kielland, 1990
- Mylothris kilimensis rondonis Kielland, 1990
- Mylothris kiwuensis rhodopoides Talbot, 1944
- Mylothris leonora Krüger, 1928 (endemic)
- Mylothris pluviata Berger, 1980 (endemic)
- Mylothris rhodope (Fabricius, 1775)
- Mylothris rubricosta rubricosta (Mabille, 1890)
- Mylothris rubricosta attenuata Talbot, 1944
- Mylothris rubricosta pulchra Berger, 1981
- Mylothris rueppellii rhodesiana Riley, 1921
- Mylothris rueppellii tirikensis Neave, 1904
- Mylothris sagala sagala Grose-Smith, 1886
- Mylothris sagala albissima Talbot, 1944
- Mylothris sagala dentatus Butler, 1896
- Mylothris sagala mahale Kielland, 1990
- Mylothris sagala narcissus Butler, 1888
- Mylothris sagala oldeanensis Kielland, 1990
- Mylothris sagala seminigra d'Abrera, 1980
- Mylothris schumanni uniformis Talbot, 1944
- Mylothris similis similis Lathy, 1906
- Mylothris similis dollmani Riley, 1921
- Mylothris sjostedti hecqui Berger, 1952
- Mylothris superbus Kielland, 1985 (endemic)
- Mylothris talboti Berger, 1980 (endemic)
- Mylothris yulei yulei Butler, 1897
- Mylothris yulei latimargo Joicey & Talbot, 1921
- Dixeia charina dagera (Suffert, 1904)
- Dixeia charina liliana (Grose-Smith, 1889)
- Dixeia dixeyi (Neave, 1904)
- Dixeia doxo alberta (Grünberg, 1912)
- Dixeia doxo costata Talbot, 1943
- Dixeia orbona vidua (Butler, 1900)
- Dixeia pigea (Boisduval, 1836)
- Dixeia spilleri (Spiller, 1884)
- Belenois aurota (Fabricius, 1793)
- Belenois calypso minor Talbot, 1943
- Belenois calypso crawshayi Butler, 1894
- Belenois creona severina (Stoll, 1781)
- Belenois diminuta Butler, 1894
- Belenois margaritacea intermedia Kielland, 1982
- Belenois margaritacea plutonica (Joicey & Talbot, 1927)
- Belenois raffrayi extendens (Joicey & Talbot, 1927)
- Belenois raffrayi similis Kielland, 1978
- Belenois rubrosignata kongwana Talbot, 1943
- Belenois solilucis loveni (Aurivillius, 1921)
- Belenois subeida sylvander Grose-Smith, 1890
- Belenois sudanensis pseudodentigera Berger, 1981
- Belenois theora laeta (Weymer, 1903)
- Belenois thysa thysa (Hopffer, 1855)
- Belenois thysa meldolae Butler, 1872
- Belenois victoria schoutedeni Berger, 1953
- Belenois welwitschii shaba Berger, 1981
- Belenois zochalia agrippinides (Holland, 1896)

== Lycaenidae ==
=== Miletinae ===
==== Liphyrini ====
- Euliphyra leucyania (Hewitson, 1874)
- Aslauga abri Collins & Libert, 1997 (endemic)
- Aslauga bouyeri congdoni Libert & Collins, 1997
- Aslauga latifurca Cottrell, 1981
- Aslauga marshalli Butler, 1899
- Aslauga orientalis Cottrell, 1981
- Aslauga prouvosti Libert & Bouyer, 1997
- Aslauga purpurascens Holland, 1890
- Aslauga tanga Libert & Collins, 1997 (endemic)
- Aslauga vininga kiellandi Libert, 1997

==== Miletini ====
- Megalopalpus zymna (Westwood, 1851)
- Spalgis jacksoni stempfferi Kielland, 1985
- Lachnocnema bibulus (Fabricius, 1793)
- Lachnocnema laches (Fabricius, 1793)
- Lachnocnema pseudobibulus Libert, 1996
- Lachnocnema sosia Libert, 1996
- Lachnocnema kiellandi Libert, 1996 (endemic)
- Lachnocnema durbani Trimen & Bowker, 1887
- Lachnocnema tanzaniensis Libert, 1996 (endemic)
- Lachnocnema jacksoni Stempffer, 1967
- Lachnocnema regularis grisea Libert, 1996
- Lachnocnema brimoides Libert, 1996
- Lachnocnema divergens Gaede, 1915
- Lachnocnema vuattouxi Libert, 1996
- Lachnocnema dohertyi Libert, 1996
- Lachnocnema luna Druce, 1910
- Lachnocnema brunea Libert, 1996
- Lachnocnema exiguus Holland, 1890
- Lachnocnema inexpectata Libert, 1996 (endemic)
- Lachnocnema unicolor Libert, 1996 (endemic)

=== Poritiinae ===
==== Liptenini ====
- Alaena amazoula nyasana Hawker-Smith, 1933
- Alaena bicolora Bethune-Baker, 1924 (endemic)
- Alaena bjornstadi Kielland, 1993 (endemic)
- Alaena caissa caissa Rebel & Rogenhofer, 1894
- Alaena caissa kagera Talbot, 1935
- Alaena dodomaensis Kielland, 1983
- Alaena ferrulineata Hawker-Smith, 1933 (endemic)
- Alaena interposita interposita Butler, 1883 (endemic)
- Alaena interposita hauttecoeuri Oberthür, 1888 (endemic)
- Alaena johanna Sharpe, 1890
- Alaena kiellandi Carcasson, 1965 (endemic)
- Alaena madibirensis Wichgraf, 1921 (endemic)
- Alaena ngonga Jackson, 1966
- Alaena nyassa nyassa Hewitson, 1877
- Alaena nyassa major Oberthür, 1888
- Alaena picata Sharpe, 1896
- Alaena reticulata Butler, 1896
- Alaena unimaculosa aurantiaca Butler, 1895
- Ptelina carnuta (Hewitson, 1873)
- Pentila alba Dewitz, 1886
- Pentila cloetensi albida Hawker-Smith, 1933
- Pentila inconspicua Druce, 1910
- Pentila pauli alberta Hulstaert, 1924
- Pentila pauli clarensis Neave, 1903
- Pentila pauli dama (Suffert, 1904)
- Pentila pauli nyassana Aurivillius, 1899
- Pentila rogersi rogersi (Druce, 1907)
- Pentila rogersi parapetreia Rebel, 1908
- Pentila rondo Kielland, 1990 (endemic)
- Pentila tachyroides Dewitz, 1879
- Pentila tropicalis mombasae (Grose-Smith & Kirby, 1889)
- Pentila umangiana connectens Hulstaert, 1924
- Pentila umangiana mpanda Congdon, Kielland & Collins, 1998
- Telipna sanguinea depuncta Talbot, 1937
- Telipna kigoma Kielland, 1978 (endemic)
- Telipna consanguinea ugandae Behune-Baker, 1926
- Ornipholidotos ugandae Stempffer, 1947
- Ornipholidotos teroensis Stempffer, 1957
- Ornipholidotos katangae reducta Libert, 2005
- Ornipholidotos amieti angulata Libert, 2005
- Ornipholidotos overlaeti intermedia Libert, 2005
- Ornipholidotos gemina fournierae Libert, 2005
- Ornipholidotos jacksoni Stempffer, 1961
- Ornipholidotos ntebi (Bethune-Baker, 1906)
- Ornipholidotos latimargo (Hawker-Smith, 1933)
- Ornipholidotos tanganyikae Kielland, 1983 (endemic)
- Ornipholidotos emarginata maxima Libert, 2005
- Ornipholidotos paradoxa orientis Libert, 2005
- Ornipholidotos nguru Kielland, 1987 (endemic)
- Ornipholidotos peucetia peucetia (Hewitson, 1866)
- Ornipholidotos peucetia peuceda (Grose-Smith, 1889)
- Cooksonia neavei (Druce, 1912)
- Mimacraea gelinia gelinia (Oberthür, 1893) (endemic)
- Mimacraea gelinia nguru Kielland, 1986 (endemic)
- Mimacraea krausei poultoni Neave, 1904
- Mimacraea landbecki Druce, 1910
- Mimacraea marginata Libert & Collins, 2000 (endemic)
- Mimacraea marshalli marshalli Trimen, 1898
- Mimacraea marshalli dohertyi Rothschild, 1901
- Mimacraea eltringhami Druce, 1912
- Mimacraea skoptoles Druce, 1907
- Mimeresia dinora discirubra (Talbot, 1937)
- Mimeresia neavei (Joicey & Talbot, 1921)
- Liptena amabilis nyanzae Congdon, Kielland & Collins, 1998
- Liptena despecta (Holland, 1890)
- Liptena eukrines Druce, 1905
- Liptena eukrinoides Talbot, 1937
- Liptena minziro Collins & Larsen, 2008
- Liptena flavicans katera Stempffer, 1956
- Liptena hapale Talbot, 1935
- Liptena homeyeri Dewitz, 1884
- Liptena kiellandi Congdon & Collins, 1998
- Liptena modesta (Kirby, 1890)
- Liptena nigromarginata Stempffer, 1961
- Liptena opaca ugandana Stempffer, Bennett & May, 1974
- Liptena orubrum teroana Talbot, 1935
- Liptena praestans congoensis Schultze, 1923
- Liptena rubromacula jacksoni Carpenter, 1934
- Liptena turbata (Kirby, 1890)
- Liptena xanthostola xantha (Grose-Smith, 1901)
- Kakumia ideoides (Dewitz, 1887)
- Tetrarhanis ilma daltoni (Poulton, 1929)
- Tetrarhanis ilma lathyi (Joicey & Talbot, 1921)
- Tetrarhanis ilma ugandae (Stempffer, 1964)
- Falcuna orientalis (Bethune-Baker, 1906)
- Larinopoda tera (Hewitson, 1873)
- Micropentila bunyoro Stempffer & Bennett, 1965
- Micropentila cherereti Stempffer & Bennett, 1965
- Micropentila jacksoni Talbot, 1937
- Micropentila katerae Stempffer & Bennett, 1965
- Micropentila mpigi Stempffer & Bennett, 1965
- Micropentila ugandae Hawker-Smith, 1933
- Micropentila victoriae Stempffer & Bennett, 1965
- Pseuderesia eleaza katera Stempffer, 1961
- Pseuderesia mapongua (Holland, 1893)
- Eresina bergeri Stempffer, 1956
- Eresina bilinea Talbot, 1935
- Eresina conradti Stempffer, 1956
- Eresina fontainei Stempffer, 1956
- Eresina katera Stempffer, 1962
- Eresina masaka Stempffer, 1962
- Eresina rougeoti Stempffer, 1956
- Eresiomera kiellandi Larsen, 1998 (endemic)
- Eresiomera rougeoti (Stempffer, 1961)
- Citrinophila erastus pallida Hawker-Smith, 1933
- Citrinophila unipunctata Bethune-Baker, 1908
- Argyrocheila inundifera Hawker-Smith, 1933
- Argyrocheila ugandae Hawker-Smith, 1933
- Teriomima subpunctata Kirby, 1887
- Teriomima puella Kirby, 1887
- Teriomima micra (Grose-Smith, 1898)
- Teriomima parva parva Hawker-Smith, 1933
- Teriomima parva beylissi Henning & Henning, 2004
- Euthecta cooksoni subgrisea Henning & Henning, 2004
- Euthecta cooksoni marginata Henning & Henning, 2004
- Euthecta cordeiroi Henning & Henning, 2004 (endemic)
- Baliochila neavei Stempffer & Bennett, 1953
- Baliochila hildegarda (Kirby, 1887)
- Baliochila dubiosa Stempffer & Bennett, 1953
- Baliochila amanica Stempffer & Bennett, 1953
- Baliochila latimarginata latimarginata (Hawker-Smith, 1933)
- Baliochila latimarginata rondoensis Henning & Henning, 2004
- Baliochila lipara Stempffer & Bennett, 1953
- Baliochila congdoni Kielland, 1990 (endemic)
- Baliochila warrengashi Collins & Larsen, 1996 (endemic)
- Baliochila lequeuxi Kielland, 1994 (endemic)
- Baliochila collinsi Henning & Henning, 2004 (endemic)
- Baliochila megadentata Henning & Henning, 2004 (endemic)
- Baliochila nguru Kielland, 1986 (endemic)
- Baliochila citrina Henning & Henning, 2004 (endemic)
- Baliochila abri Henning & Henning, 2004 (endemic)
- Baliochila fragilis Stempffer & Bennett, 1953
- Baliochila pseudofragilis Kielland, 1976 (endemic)
- Baliochila stygia Stempffer & Bennett, 1953
- Baliochila fusca Henning & Henning, 2004 (endemic)
- Baliochila mwanihanae Congdon, Kielland & Collins, 1998 (endemic)
- Baliochila pringlei Stempffer, 1967 (endemic)
- Cnodontes vansomereni Stempffer & Bennett, 1953
- Congdonia duplex Henning & Henning, 2004 (endemic)
- Eresinopsides bichroma Strand, 1911
- Eresinopsides bamptoni Henning & Henning, 2004 (endemic)

==== Epitolini ====
- Toxochitona gerda (Kirby, 1890)
- Iridana hypocala Eltringham, 1929
- Iridana jacksoni Stempffer, 1964
- Iridana katera Stempffer, 1964
- Iridana marina Talbot, 1935
- Iridana unyoro Stempffer, 1964
- Teratoneura congoensis Stempffer, 1954
- Cerautola ceraunia (Hewitson, 1873)
- Cerautola crowleyi congdoni Libert & Collins, 1999
- Cerautola miranda vidua (Talbot, 1935)
- Cerautola semibrunnea bamptoni Libert & Collins, 1999
- Geritola gerina (Hewitson, 1878)
- Geritola goodii (Holland, 1890)
- Geritola liana (Roche, 1954)
- Geritola subargentea (Jackson, 1964)
- Stempfferia cercene (Hewitson, 1873)
- Stempfferia cercenoides (Holland, 1890)
- Stempfferia insulana (Aurivillius, 1923)
- Stempfferia mara (Talbot, 1935)
- Cephetola cephena entebbeana (Bethune-Baker, 1926)
- Cephetola eliasis (Kielland & Congdon, 1998)
- Cephetola gerdae (Kielland & Libert, 1998) (endemic)
- Cephetola izidori (Kielland & Congdon, 1998)
- Cephetola kamengensis (Jackson, 1962)
- Cephetola katerae (Jackson, 1962)
- Cephetola kiellandi (Libert & Congdon, 1998)
- Cephetola mariae Libert, 1999
- Cephetola martini (Libert, 1998)
- Cephetola mpangensis (Jackson, 1962)
- Cephetola orientalis (Roche, 1954)
- Cephetola peteri (Kielland & Congdon, 1998)
- Cephetola pinodes budduana (Talbot, 1937)
- Cephetola subgriseata (Jackson, 1964)
- Cephetola sublustris (Bethune-Baker, 1904)
- Cephetola tanzaniensis Libert, 1999 (endemic)
- Cephetola vinalli (Talbot, 1935)
- Cephetola viridana (Joicey & Talbot, 1921)
- Deloneura abri Congdon & Collins, 1998 (endemic)
- Deloneura ochrascens littoralis Talbot, 1935
- Deloneura subfusca Hawker-Smith, 1933
- Neaveia lamborni orientalis Jackson, 1962
- Epitolina dispar (Kirby, 1887)
- Epitolina melissa (Druce, 1888)
- Epitolina catori ugandae Jackson, 1962
- Hypophytala benitensis minziro Libert & Collins, 1999
- Hypophytala vansomereni (Jackson, 1964)
- Hewitsonia inexpectata Bouyer, 1997
- Hewitsonia kuehnei Collins & Larsen, 2008
- Hewitsonia intermedia Jackson, 1962

=== Aphnaeinae ===
- Pseudaletis agrippina Druce, 1888
- Pseudaletis busoga van Someren, 1939
- Pseudaletis antimachus (Staudinger, 1888)
- Lipaphnaeus aderna pan (Talbot, 1935)
- Lipaphnaeus aderna spindasoides (Aurivillius, 1916)
- Lipaphnaeus eustorgia (Hulstaert, 1924)
- Lipaphnaeus leonina paradoxa (Schultze, 1908)
- Lipaphnaeus leonina loxura (Rebel, 1914)
- Chloroselas azurea Butler, 1900
- Chloroselas esmeralda Butler, 1886
- Chloroselas minima Jackson, 1966
- Chloroselas overlaeti Stempffer, 1956
- Chloroselas pseudozeritis (Trimen, 1873)
- Vansomerenia rogersi (Riley, 1932)
- Crudaria leroma (Wallengren, 1857)
- Cigaritis apelles (Oberthür, 1878)
- Cigaritis brunnea (Jackson, 1966)
- Cigaritis collinsi (Kielland, 1980) (endemic)
- Cigaritis crustaria (Holland, 1890)
- Cigaritis ella (Hewitson, 1865)
- Cigaritis homeyeri (Dewitz, 1887)
- Cigaritis nairobiensis (Sharpe, 1904)
- Cigaritis nyassae (Butler, 1884)
- Cigaritis tanganyikae (Kielland, 1990) (endemic)
- Cigaritis tavetensis (Lathy, 1906)
- Cigaritis trimeni (Neave, 1910)
- Cigaritis victoriae (Butler, 1884)
- Axiocerses harpax ugandana Clench, 1963
- Axiocerses tjoane (Wallengren, 1857)
- Axiocerses bambana Grose-Smith, 1900
- Axiocerses coalescens Henning & Henning, 1996
- Axiocerses styx Rebel, 1908 (endemic)
- Axiocerses kiellandi Henning & Henning, 1996 (endemic)
- Axiocerses amanga (Westwood, 1881)
- Axiocerses punicea (Grose-Smith, 1889)
- Aloeides conradsi conradsi (Aurivillius, 1907)
- Aloeides conradsi angoniensis Tite & Dickson, 1973
- Aloeides conradsi talboti Tite & Dickson, 1973
- Aloeides molomo kiellandi Carcasson, 1961
- Aphnaeus argyrocyclus Holland, 1890
- Aphnaeus erikssoni kiellandi Stempffer, 1972
- Aphnaeus erikssoni rex Aurivillius, 1909
- Aphnaeus hutchinsonii Trimen & Bowker, 1887
- Aphnaeus jefferyi Hawker-Smith, 1928
- Aphnaeus marshalli Neave, 1910
- Aphnaeus orcas (Drury, 1782)

=== Theclinae ===
- Myrina dermaptera nyassae Talbot, 1935
- Myrina sharpei Bethune-Baker, 1906
- Myrina silenus ficedula Trimen, 1879
- Hypolycaena amanica Stempffer, 1951 (endemic)
- Hypolycaena antifaunus latimacula (Joicey & Talbot, 1921)
- Hypolycaena auricostalis auricostalis (Butler, 1897)
- Hypolycaena auricostalis frommi Strand, 1911
- Hypolycaena buxtoni rogersi Bethune-Baker, 1924
- Hypolycaena buxtoni spurcus Talbot, 1929
- Hypolycaena hatita japhusa Riley, 1921
- Hypolycaena hatita ugandae Sharpe, 1904
- Hypolycaena kadiskos Druce, 1890
- Hypolycaena lebona davenporti Larsen, 1997
- Hypolycaena liara liara Druce, 1890
- Hypolycaena liara plana Talbot, 1935
- Hypolycaena obscura Stempffer, 1947
- Hypolycaena nigra Bethune-Baker, 1914
- Hypolycaena pachalica Butler, 1888
- Hemiolaus caeculus caeculus (Hopffer, 1855)
- Hemiolaus caeculus littoralis Stempffer, 1954
- Hemiolaus caeculus vividus Pinhey, 1962
- Leptomyrina gorgias sobrina Talbot, 1935
- Iolaus alienus Trimen, 1898
- Iolaus apatosa (Stempffer, 1952)
- Iolaus bamptoni (Congdon & Collins, 1998) (endemic)
- Iolaus bellina exquisita (Riley, 1928)
- Iolaus congdoni (Kielland, 1985)
- Iolaus diametra diametra (Karsch, 1895)
- Iolaus diametra littoralis (Congdon & Collins, 1998)
- Iolaus diametra zanzibarensis (Congdon & Collins, 1998)
- Iolaus dubiosa (Stempffer & Bennett, 1959)
- Iolaus farquharsoni (Bethune-Baker, 1922)
- Iolaus fontainei (Stempffer, 1956)
- Iolaus frater (Joicey & Talbot, 1921)
- Iolaus hemicyanus Sharpe, 1904
- Iolaus jacksoni (Stempffer, 1950)
- Iolaus mermis (Druce, 1896)
- Iolaus mimosae rhodosense (Stempffer & Bennett, 1959)
- Iolaus nasisii (Riley, 1928)
- Iolaus neavei katera Talbot, 1937
- Iolaus nolaensis amanica (Stempffer, 1951)
- Iolaus sidus Trimen, 1864
- Iolaus silanus silanus Grose-Smith, 1889
- Iolaus silanus alticola (Stempffer, 1961)
- Iolaus silanus rondo (Congdon & Collins, 1998)
- Iolaus silanus zanzibarica (Congdon & Collins, 1998)
- Iolaus stenogrammica (Riley, 1928)
- Iolaus tajoraca ertli Aurivillius, 1916
- Iolaus violacea (Riley, 1928)
- Iolaus trimeni Wallengren, 1875
- Iolaus henryi (Stempffer, 1961)
- Iolaus jamesoni (Druce, 1891)
- Iolaus parasilanus parasilanus Rebel, 1914
- Iolaus parasilanus divaricatus (Riley, 1928)
- Iolaus poecilaon (Riley, 1928)
- Iolaus aequatorialis (Stempffer & Bennett, 1958)
- Iolaus cottrelli (Stempffer & Bennett, 1958)
- Iolaus crawshayi littoralis (Stempffer & Bennett, 1958)
- Iolaus iturensis (Joicey & Talbot, 1921)
- Iolaus lalos (Druce, 1896)
- Iolaus maritimus usambara (Stempffer, 1961)
- Iolaus montana (Kielland, 1978) (endemic)
- Iolaus ndolae (Stempffer & Bennett, 1958)
- Iolaus pamae Heath, 1994
- Iolaus silarus Druce, 1885
- Iolaus timon orientius Hulstaert, 1924
- Iolaus catori cottoni Bethune-Baker, 1908
- Etesiolaus pinheyi (Kielland, 1986) (endemic)
- Stugeta bowkeri maria Suffert, 1904
- Stugeta bowkeri mombasae Butler, 1901
- Stugeta bowkeri nyasana Talbot, 1935
- Stugeta mimetica Aurivillius, 1916 (endemic)
- Pilodeudorix mimeta angusta Libert, 2004
- Pilodeudorix baginei (Collins & Larsen, 1991)
- Pilodeudorix anetia (Hulstaert, 1924)
- Pilodeudorix bemba (Neave, 1910)
- Pilodeudorix canescens (Joicey & Talbot, 1921)
- Pilodeudorix infuscata (Stempffer, 1964)
- Pilodeudorix kafuensis (Neave, 1910)
- Pilodeudorix mera kinumbensis (Dufrane, 1945)
- Pilodeudorix nyanzana (Stempffer, 1957)
- Pilodeudorix otraeda genuba (Hewitson, 1875)
- Pilodeudorix caerulea (Druce, 1890)
- Pilodeudorix obscurata (Trimen, 1891)
- Pilodeudorix camerona katanga (Clench, 1965)
- Pilodeudorix congoana orientalis (Stempffer, 1957)
- Pilodeudorix kohli (Aurivillius, 1921)
- Pilodeudorix rodgersi Kielland, 1985 (endemic)
- Pilodeudorix zela (Hewitson, 1869)
- Pilodeudorix zeloides (Butler, 1901)
- Pilodeudorix hugoi Libert, 2004
- Pilodeudorix corruscans (Aurivillius, 1898)
- Pilodeudorix kiellandi (Congdon & Collins, 1998)
- Pilodeudorix violetta (Aurivillius, 1897)
- Paradeudorix ituri ugandae (Talbot, 1935)
- Paradeudorix marginata (Stempffer, 1962)
- Hypomyrina nomenia extensa Libert, 2004
- Deudorix caliginosa Lathy, 1903
- Deudorix dariaves Hewitson, 1877
- Deudorix dinochares Grose-Smith, 1887
- Deudorix dinomenes dinomenes Grose-Smith, 1887
- Deudorix dinomenes diomedes Jackson, 1966
- Deudorix diocles Hewitson, 1869
- Deudorix ecaudata Gifford, 1963
- Deudorix jacksoni Talbot, 1935
- Deudorix livia (Klug, 1834)
- Deudorix lorisona lorisona (Hewitson, 1862)
- Deudorix lorisona coffea Jackson, 1966
- Deudorix lorisona baronica Ungemach, 1932
- Deudorix montana (Kielland, 1985)
- Deudorix mpanda (Kielland, 1990) (endemic)
- Deudorix odana Druce, 1887
- Deudorix penningtoni van Son, 1949
- Deudorix ufipa Kielland, 1978
- Deudorix vansomereni Stempffer, 1951
- Capys brunneus Aurivillius, 1916
- Capys catharus Riley, 1932
- Capys connexivus Butler, 1897
- Capys usambarae Congdon & Collins, 1998 (endemic)

=== Polyommatinae ===
==== Lycaenesthini ====
- Anthene afra (Bethune-Baker, 1910)
- Anthene alberta (Bethune-Baker, 1910)
- Anthene butleri stempfferi Storace, 1954
- Anthene chirinda (Bethune-Baker, 1910)
- Anthene contrastata mashuna (Stevenson, 1937)
- Anthene crawshayi (Butler, 1899)
- Anthene definita (Butler, 1899)
- Anthene hobleyi ufipa Kielland, 1990
- Anthene indefinita (Bethune-Baker, 1910)
- Anthene irumu (Stempffer, 1948)
- Anthene katera Talbot, 1937
- Anthene kersteni (Gerstaecker, 1871)
- Anthene lasti (Grose-Smith & Kirby, 1894)
- Anthene lemnos loa (Strand, 1911)
- Anthene leptala (Courvoisier, 1914) (endemic)
- Anthene ligures (Hewitson, 1874)
- Anthene liodes (Hewitson, 1874)
- Anthene madibirensis (Wichgraf, 1921) (endemic)
- Anthene minima (Trimen, 1893)
- Anthene montana Kielland, 1990 (endemic)
- Anthene mpanda Kielland, 1990
- Anthene nigropunctata (Bethune-Baker, 1910)
- Anthene opalina Stempffer, 1946
- Anthene otacilia (Trimen, 1868)
- Anthene kikuyu (Bethune-Baker, 1910)
- Anthene rubricinctus anadema (Druce, 1905)
- Anthene rubricinctus jeanneli Stempffer, 1961
- Anthene rubrimaculata rubrimaculata (Strand, 1909) (endemic)
- Anthene rubrimaculata tukuyu Kielland, 1990 (endemic)
- Anthene rubrimaculata zanzibarica Congdon & Collins, 1998 (endemic)
- Anthene schoutedeni (Hulstaert, 1924)
- Anthene sylvanus albicans (Grünberg, 1910)
- Anthene talboti Stempffer, 1936
- Anthene ukerewensis (Strand, 1909) (endemic)
- Anthene uzungwae Kielland, 1990 (endemic)
- Anthene wilsoni (Talbot, 1935)
- Anthene kalinzu (Stempffer, 1950)
- Anthene chryseostictus (Bethune-Baker, 1910)
- Anthene gemmifera (Neave, 1910)
- Anthene lusones (Hewitson, 1874)
- Anthene staudingeri (Grose-Smith & Kirby, 1894)
- Anthene hades (Bethune-Baker, 1910)
- Anthene inconspicua (Druce, 1910)
- Anthene kamilila (Bethune-Baker, 1910)
- Anthene kimboza (Kielland, 1990)
- Anthene lamias katerae (d'Abrera, 1980)
- Anthene nigeriae (Aurivillius, 1905)
- Anthene oculatus (Grose-Smith & Kirby, 1893)
- Cupidesthes arescopa orientalis (Stempffer, 1962)
- Cupidesthes eliasi Congdon, Kielland & Collins, 1998
- Cupidesthes leonina (Bethune-Baker, 1903)
- Cupidesthes ysobelae Jackson, 1966
- Lycaena phlaeas abbottii (Holland, 1892)
- Lycaena phlaeas ethiopica (Poulton, 1922)

==== Polyommatini ====
- Cupidopsis jobates (Hopffer, 1855)
- Pseudonacaduba aethiops (Mabille, 1877)
- Pseudonacaduba sichela (Wallengren, 1857)
- Uranothauma antinorii felthami (Stevenson, 1934)
- Uranothauma confusa Kielland, 1989
- Uranothauma cordatus (Sharpe, 1892)
- Uranothauma crawshayi Butler, 1895
- Uranothauma cuneatum Tite, 1958
- Uranothauma delatorum Heron, 1909
- Uranothauma falkensteini (Dewitz, 1879)
- Uranothauma heritsia chibonotana (Aurivillius, 1910)
- Uranothauma heritsia intermedia (Tite, 1958)
- Uranothauma heritsia virgo (Butler, 1896)
- Uranothauma kilimensis Kielland, 1985 (endemic)
- Uranothauma lukwangule Kielland, 1987 (endemic)
- Uranothauma lunifer (Rebel, 1914)
- Uranothauma nguru Kielland, 1985 (endemic)
- Uranothauma nubifer (Trimen, 1895)
- Uranothauma poggei (Dewitz, 1879)
- Uranothauma uganda Kielland, 1980
- Uranothauma usambarae Kielland, 1980 (endemic)
- Uranothauma vansomereni Stempffer, 1951
- Uranothauma williamsi Carcasson, 1961
- Phlyaria cyara tenuimarginata (Grünberg, 1908)
- Cacyreus audeoudi Stempffer, 1936
- Cacyreus tespis (Herbst, 1804)
- Cacyreus virilis Stempffer, 1936
- Harpendyreus aequatorialis vulcanica (Joicey & Talbot, 1924)
- Harpendyreus berger Stempffer, 1976 (endemic)
- Harpendyreus boma (Bethune-Baker, 1926) (endemic)
- Harpendyreus juno (Butler, 1897)
- Harpendyreus major (Joicey & Talbot, 1924)
- Harpendyreus marungensis marungensis (Joicey & Talbot, 1924)
- Harpendyreus marungensis mangalisae Kielland, 1986
- Harpendyreus meruana (Aurivillius, 1910) (endemic)
- Leptotes brevidentatus (Tite, 1958)
- Leptotes marginalis (Stempffer, 1944)
- Tuxentius calice calice (Hopffer, 1855)
- Tuxentius calice gregorii (Butler, 1894)
- Tuxentius ertli (Aurivillius, 1907)
- Tuxentius margaritaceus (Sharpe, 1892)
- Tuxentius melaena (Trimen & Bowker, 1887)
- Tuxentius stempfferi (Kielland, 1976) (endemic)
- Tarucus grammicus (Grose-Smith & Kirby, 1893)
- Zintha hintza (Trimen, 1864)
- Actizera stellata (Trimen, 1883)
- Azanus isis (Drury, 1773)
- Eicochrysops distractus (de Joannis & Verity, 1913)
- Eicochrysops eicotrochilus Bethune-Baker, 1924
- Eicochrysops hippocrates (Fabricius, 1793)
- Eicochrysops masai (Bethune-Baker, 1905)
- Eicochrysops messapus mahallakoaena (Wallengren, 1857)
- Eicochrysops rogersi Bethune-Baker, 1924
- Euchrysops albistriata (Capronnier, 1889)
- Euchrysops barkeri (Trimen, 1893)
- Euchrysops crawshayi crawshayi (Butler, 1899)
- Euchrysops crawshayi fontainei Stempffer, 1967
- Euchrysops kabrosae rosieae Congdon, Kielland & Collins, 1998
- Euchrysops mauensis Bethune-Baker, 1923
- Euchrysops nandensis (Neave, 1904)
- Euchrysops severini Hulstaert, 1924
- Euchrysops subpallida Bethune-Baker, 1923
- Thermoniphas distincta (Talbot, 1935)
- Thermoniphas fontainei Stempffer, 1956
- Thermoniphas colorata (Ungemach, 1932)
- Thermoniphas plurilimbata Karsch, 1895
- Oboronia bueronica Karsch, 1895
- Oboronia ornata vestalis (Aurivillius, 1895)
- Oboronia pseudopunctatus (Strand, 1912)
- Oboronia punctatus (Dewitz, 1879)
- Chilades naidina (Butler, 1886)
- Lepidochrysops anerius kiellandi Stempffer, 1972
- Lepidochrysops chala Kielland, 1980
- Lepidochrysops chloauges (Bethune-Baker, [1923])
- Lepidochrysops cinerea (Bethune-Baker, [1923])
- Lepidochrysops cupreus (Neave, 1910)
- Lepidochrysops desmondi Stempffer, 1951
- Lepidochrysops dollmani (Bethune-Baker, [1923])
- Lepidochrysops glauca (Trimen & Bowker, 1887)
- Lepidochrysops intermedia cottrelli Stempffer, 1954
- Lepidochrysops inyangae (Pinhey, 1945)
- Lepidochrysops jansei van Someren, 1957
- Lepidochrysops kennethi Kielland, 1986 (endemic)
- Lepidochrysops kilimanjarensis (Strand, 1909) (endemic)
- Lepidochrysops koaena (Strand, 1911) (endemic)
- Lepidochrysops kocak Seven, 1997
- Lepidochrysops loveni (Aurivillius, 1922)
- Lepidochrysops lukenia van Someren, 1957
- Lepidochrysops mpanda Tite, 1961 (endemic)
- Lepidochrysops neonegus (Bethune-Baker, [1923])
- Lepidochrysops peculiaris peculiaris (Rogenhofer, 1891)
- Lepidochrysops peculiaris hypoleucus (Butler, 1893)
- Lepidochrysops plebeia proclus (Hulstaert, 1924)
- Lepidochrysops solwezii (Bethune-Baker, [1923])

== Riodinidae ==
=== Nemeobiinae ===
- Abisara caeca Rebel, 1914
- Abisara rutherfordii cyclops Riley, 1932
- Abisara rogersi simulacris Riley, 1932
- Abisara neavei neavei Riley, 1932
- Abisara neavei congdoni Kielland, 1985
- Abisara neavei mahale Kielland, 1978
- Abisara delicata tanzania Kielland, 1986
- Abisara delicata zanzibarica Collins, 1990

== Nymphalidae ==
=== Libytheinae ===
- Libythea labdaca labdaca Westwood, 1851
- Libythea labdaca laius Trimen, 1879

=== Danainae ===
==== Danaini ====
- Danaus chrysippus alcippus (Cramer, 1777)
- Danaus chrysippus orientis (Aurivillius, 1909)
- Danaus dorippus (Klug, 1845)
- Tirumala formosa formosa (Godman, 1880)
- Tirumala formosa mercedonia (Karsch, 1894)
- Tirumala petiverana (Doubleday, 1847)
- Amauris niavius niavius (Linnaeus, 1758)
- Amauris niavius dominicanus Trimen, 1879
- Amauris tartarea tartarea Mabille, 1876
- Amauris tartarea damoclides Staudinger, 1896
- Amauris tartarea tukuyuensis Kielland, 1990
- Amauris albimaculata hanningtoni Butler, 1888
- Amauris albimaculata interposita Talbot, 1940
- Amauris albimaculata latifascia Talbot, 1940
- Amauris albimaculata magnimacula Rebel, 1914
- Amauris crawshayi crawshayi Butler, 1897
- Amauris crawshayi oscarus Thurau, 1904
- Amauris damocles makuyensis Carcasson, 1964
- Amauris echeria meruensis Talbot, 1940
- Amauris echeria serica Talbot, 1940
- Amauris echeria terrena Talbot, 1940
- Amauris ellioti altumi van Someren, 1936
- Amauris ellioti junia (Le Cerf, 1920)
- Amauris hecate (Butler, 1866)
- Amauris hyalites Butler, 1874
- Amauris inferna uganda Talbot, 1940
- Amauris ochlea ochlea (Boisduval, 1847)
- Amauris ochlea bumilleri Lanz, 1896
- Amauris vashti (Butler, 1869)

=== Satyrinae ===
==== Elymniini ====
- Elymniopsis bammakoo rattrayi (Sharpe, 1902)

==== Melanitini ====
- Gnophodes betsimena diversa (Butler, 1880)
- Gnophodes betsimena parmeno Doubleday, 1849
- Gnophodes chelys (Fabricius, 1793)
- Melanitis libya Distant, 1882
- Aphysoneura pigmentaria pigmentaria Karsch, 1894
- Aphysoneura pigmentaria kanga Kielland, 1989
- Aphysoneura pigmentaria kiellandi Congdon & Collins, 1998
- Aphysoneura pigmentaria mbulu Kielland, 1989
- Aphysoneura pigmentaria obnubila Riley, 1923
- Aphysoneura pigmentaria semilatilimba Kielland, 1989
- Aphysoneura pigmentaria seminigra Kielland, 1985
- Aphysoneura pigmentaria songeana Kielland, 1989
- Aphysoneura pigmentaria uzungwa Kielland, 1989
- Aphysoneura scapulifascia Joicey & Talbot, 1922

==== Satyrini ====
- Bicyclus angulosa selousi (Trimen, 1895)
- Bicyclus anynana (Butler, 1879)
- Bicyclus auricruda fulgidus Fox, 1963
- Bicyclus buea (Strand, 1912)
- Bicyclus campina campina (Aurivillius, 1901)
- Bicyclus campina ocelligera (Strand, 1910)
- Bicyclus campus (Karsch, 1893)
- Bicyclus cooksoni (Druce, 1905)
- Bicyclus cottrelli (van Son, 1952)
- Bicyclus danckelmani (Rogenhofer, 1891) (endemic)
- Bicyclus pareensis Collins & Kielland, 2008
- Bicyclus dentata (Sharpe, 1898)
- Bicyclus dubia (Aurivillius, 1893)
- Bicyclus ena (Hewitson, 1877)
- Bicyclus golo (Aurivillius, 1893)
- Bicyclus graueri (Rebel, 1914)
- Bicyclus hyperanthus (Bethune-Baker, 1908)
- Bicyclus ignobilis acutus Condamin, 1965
- Bicyclus istaris (Plötz, 1880)
- Bicyclus jefferyi Fox, 1963
- Bicyclus kenia (Rogenhofer, 1891)
- Bicyclus kiellandi Condamin, 1986 (endemic)
- Bicyclus mahale Congdon, Kielland & Collins, 1998 (endemic)
- Bicyclus mandanes Hewitson, 1873
- Bicyclus mesogena ugandae (Riley, 1926)
- Bicyclus mollitia (Karsch, 1895)
- Bicyclus nachtetis Condamin, 1965
- Bicyclus rhacotis (Hewitson, 1866)
- Bicyclus safitza (Westwood, 1850)
- Bicyclus sambulos sambulos (Hewitson, 1877)
- Bicyclus sambulos cyaneus Condamin, 1961
- Bicyclus sandace (Hewitson, 1877)
- Bicyclus saussurei angustus Condamin, 1970
- Bicyclus sebetus (Hewitson, 1877)
- Bicyclus similis Condamin, 1963 (endemic)
- Bicyclus simulacris simulacris Kielland, 1990
- Bicyclus simulacris septentrionalis Kielland, 1990
- Bicyclus smithi (Aurivillius, 1899)
- Bicyclus sophrosyne (Plötz, 1880)
- Bicyclus tanzanicus Condamin, 1986 (endemic)
- Bicyclus trilophus jacksoni Condamin, 1961
- Bicyclus uzungwensis uzungwensis Kielland, 1990 (endemic)
- Bicyclus uzungwensis granti Kielland, 1990 (endemic)
- Bicyclus vansoni Condamin, 1965
- Bicyclus vulgaris (Butler, 1868)
- Bicyclus xeneoides Condamin, 1961
- Heteropsis elisi tanzanica (Kielland, 1994)
- Heteropsis elisi uluguru (Kielland, 1990)
- Heteropsis perspicua (Trimen, 1873)
- Heteropsis phaea (Karsch, 1894)
- Heteropsis simonsii (Butler, 1877)
- Heteropsis teratia (Karsch, 1894)
- Heteropsis ubenica ubenica (Thurau, 1903)
- Heteropsis ubenica mahale (Kielland, 1994)
- Heteropsis ubenica ugandica (Kielland, 1994)
- Heteropsis ubenica uzungwa (Kielland, 1994)
- Heteropsis peitho gigas (Libert, 2006)
- Ypthima albida Butler, 1888
- Ypthima antennata van Son, 1955
- Ypthima asterope (Klug, 1832)
- Ypthima condamini Kielland, 1982
- Ypthima doleta Kirby, 1880
- Ypthima granulosa Butler, 1883
- Ypthima pupillaris obscurata Kielland, 1982
- Ypthima recta Overlaet, 1955
- Ypthima rhodesiana Carcasson, 1961
- Ypthima simplicia Butler, 1876
- Ypthimomorpha itonia (Hewitson, 1865)
- Mashuna upemba (Overlaet, 1955)
- Neocoenyra cooksoni Druce, 1907
- Neocoenyra duplex Butler, 1886
- Neocoenyra fuligo Kielland, 1990 (endemic)
- Neocoenyra fulleborni Thurau, 1903 (endemic)
- Neocoenyra heckmanni heckmanni Thurau, 1903 (endemic)
- Neocoenyra heckmanni kennethi Kielland, 1990 (endemic)
- Neocoenyra heckmanni mangalisa Kielland, 1990 (endemic)
- Neocoenyra heckmanni mbinga Kielland, 1990 (endemic)
- Neocoenyra heckmanni uzungwae Kielland, 1990 (endemic)
- Neocoenyra jordani jordani Rebel, 1906 (endemic)
- Neocoenyra jordani septentrionalis Kielland, 1990 (endemic)
- Neocoenyra kivuensis Seydel, 1929
- Neocoenyra masaica Carcasson, 1958
- Neocoenyra paralellopupillata (Karsch, 1897) (endemic)
- Neocoenyra petersi Kielland, 1990 (endemic)
- Neocoenyra pinheyi Carcasson, 1961 (endemic)
- Neocoenyra ypthimoides Butler, 1894
- Coenyropsis bera (Hewitson, 1877)
- Coenyropsis carcassoni Kielland, 1976
- Physcaeneura jacksoni Carcasson, 1961 (endemic)
- Physcaeneura leda (Gerstaecker, 1871)
- Physcaeneura pione Godman, 1880
- Physcaeneura robertsi Kielland, 1990 (endemic)
- Neita orbipalus orbipalus Kielland, 1990 (endemic)
- Neita orbipalus congdoni Kielland, 1990 (endemic)
- Neita victoriae (Aurivillius, 1899)

=== Charaxinae ===
==== Charaxini ====
- Charaxes varanes vologeses (Mabille, 1876)
- Charaxes fulvescens monitor Rothschild, 1900
- Charaxes acuminatus acuminatus Thurau, 1903
- Charaxes acuminatus kigezia van Someren, 1963
- Charaxes acuminatus rondonis Kielland, 1987
- Charaxes acuminatus teitensis van Someren, 1963
- Charaxes acuminatus usambarensis van Someren, 1963
- Charaxes candiope (Godart, 1824)
- Charaxes protoclea azota (Hewitson, 1877)
- Charaxes protoclea catenaria Rousseau-Decelle, 1934
- Charaxes protoclea nothodes Jordan, 1911
- Charaxes macclounii Butler, 1895
- Charaxes lasti lasti Grose-Smith, 1889
- Charaxes lasti kimbozae Kielland, 1984
- Charaxes lasti magomberae Kielland, 1984
- Charaxes cynthia mukuyu van Someren, 1969
- Charaxes cynthia parvicaudatus Lathy, 1925
- Charaxes lucretius maximus van Someren, 1971
- Charaxes jasius harrisoni Sharpe, 1904
- Charaxes jasius saturnus Butler, 1866
- Charaxes hansali baringana Rothschild, 1905
- Charaxes castor castor (Cramer, 1775)
- Charaxes castor arthuri van Someren, 1971
- Charaxes castor flavifasciatus Butler, 1895
- Charaxes brutus alcyone Stoneham, 1943
- Charaxes brutus angustus Rothschild, 1900
- Charaxes brutus natalensis Staudinger, 1885
- Charaxes brutus roberti Turlin, 1987
- Charaxes ansorgei kilimanjarica van Someren, 1967
- Charaxes ansorgei kungwensis van Someren, 1967
- Charaxes ansorgei levicki Poulton, 1933
- Charaxes ansorgei loita Plantrou, 1982
- Charaxes ansorgei rydoni van Someren, 1967
- Charaxes ansorgei simoni Turlin, 1987
- Charaxes ansorgei ufipa Kielland, 1978
- Charaxes pollux pollux (Cramer, 1775)
- Charaxes pollux geminus Rothschild, 1900
- Charaxes pollux maua van Someren, 1967
- Charaxes pollux mira Ackery, 1995
- Charaxes pollux piersoni Collins, 1990
- Charaxes druceanus praestans Turlin, 1989
- Charaxes druceanus proximans Joicey & Talbot, 1922
- Charaxes druceanus septentrionalis Lathy, 1925
- Charaxes druceanus teita van Someren, 1939
- Charaxes eudoxus katerae Carpenter, 1937
- Charaxes eudoxus mechowi Rothschild, 1900
- Charaxes eudoxus raffaellae Plantrou, 1982
- Charaxes lucyae lucyae van Someren, 1975 (endemic)
- Charaxes lucyae gabriellae Turlin & Chovet, 1987 (endemic)
- Charaxes lucyae mwanihanae Kielland, 1982 (endemic)
- Charaxes richelmanni scheveni Ackery, 1995
- Charaxes numenes aequatorialis van Someren, 1972
- Charaxes tiridates tiridatinus Röber, 1936
- Charaxes bipunctatus ugandensis van Someren, 1972
- Charaxes mixtus tanzanicus Kielland, 1988
- Charaxes bohemani Felder & Felder, 1859
- Charaxes smaragdalis homonymus Bryk, 1939
- Charaxes smaragdalis kagera van Someren, 1964
- Charaxes smaragdalis kigoma van Someren, 1964
- Charaxes xiphares brevicaudatus Schultze, 1914
- Charaxes xiphares kiellandi Plantrou, 1976
- Charaxes xiphares kilimensis van Someren, 1972
- Charaxes xiphares maudei Joicey & Talbot, 1918
- Charaxes xiphares nguru Collins, 1989
- Charaxes xiphares sitebi Plantrou, 1981
- Charaxes xiphares walwandi Collins, 1989
- Charaxes cithaeron cithaeron Felder & Felder, 1859
- Charaxes cithaeron joanae van Someren, 1964
- Charaxes cithaeron kennethi Poulton, 1926
- Charaxes violetta maritima van Someren, 1966
- Charaxes violetta melloni Fox, 1963
- Charaxes imperialis graziellae Turlin, 1989
- Charaxes imperialis lisomboensis van Someren, 1975
- Charaxes ameliae amelina Joicey & Talbot, 1925
- Charaxes ameliae victoriae van Someren, 1972
- Charaxes pythodoris pythodoris Hewitson, 1873
- Charaxes pythodoris nesaea Grose-Smith, 1889
- Charaxes pythodoris pallida van Someren, 1963
- Charaxes zingha (Stoll, 1780)
- Charaxes etesipe etesipe (Godart, 1824)
- Charaxes etesipe pemba van Someren, 1966
- Charaxes etesipe shaba Berger, 1981
- Charaxes etesipe tavetensis Rothschild, 1894
- Charaxes penricei penricei Rothschild, 1900
- Charaxes penricei tanganyikae van Someren, 1966
- Charaxes achaemenes Felder & Felder, 1867
- Charaxes jahlusa argynnides Westwood, 1864
- Charaxes jahlusa kenyensis Joicey & Talbot, 1925
- Charaxes jahlusa kigomaensis van Someren, 1975
- Charaxes jahlusa mafiae Turlin & Lequeux, 1992
- Charaxes jahlusa rwandensis Plantrou, 1976
- Charaxes eupale latimargo Joicey & Talbot, 1921
- Charaxes eupale veneris White & Grant, 1989
- Charaxes dilutus dilutus Rothschild, 1898
- Charaxes dilutus amanica Collins, 1990
- Charaxes anticlea adusta Rothschild, 1900
- Charaxes baumanni baumanni Rogenhofer, 1891
- Charaxes baumanni granti Turlin, 1989
- Charaxes baumanni interposita van Someren, 1971
- Charaxes baumanni tenuis van Someren, 1971
- Charaxes baumanni whytei Butler, 1894
- Charaxes blanda Rothschild, 1897
- Charaxes catachrous van Someren & Jackson, 1952
- Charaxes etheocles carpenteri van Someren & Jackson, 1957
- Charaxes margaretae Rydon, 1980
- Charaxes chintechi van Someren, 1975
- Charaxes howarthi Minig, 1976
- Charaxes phaeus Hewitson, 1877
- Charaxes fionae Henning, 1977
- Charaxes kirki Butler, 1881
- Charaxes berkeleyi berkeleyi van Someren & Jackson, 1957
- Charaxes berkeleyi marci Congdon & Collins, 1998
- Charaxes aubyni aubyni van Someren & Jackson, 1952
- Charaxes aubyni australis van Someren & Jackson, 1957
- Charaxes contrarius van Someren, 1969
- Charaxes pembanus Jordan, 1925 (endemic)
- Charaxes usambarae usambarae van Someren & Jackson, 1952 (endemic)
- Charaxes usambarae maridadi Collins, 1987 (endemic)
- Charaxes guderiana (Dewitz, 1879)
- Charaxes pleione bebra Rothschild, 1900
- Charaxes zoolina zoolina (Westwood, [1850])
- Charaxes zoolina mafugensis Jackson, 1956
- Charaxes nichetes leoninus Butler, 1895
- Charaxes nichetes pantherinus Rousseau-Decelle, 1934
- Charaxes lycurgus bernardiana Plantrou, 1978
- Charaxes zelica toyoshimai Carcasson, 1964
- Charaxes porthos dummeri Joicey & Talbot, 1922
- Charaxes doubledayi Aurivillius, 1899
- Charaxes gerdae Rydon, 1989
- Charaxes phenix phenix Turlin & Lequeux, 1993 (endemic)
- Charaxes phenix daniellae White, 1996 (endemic)
- Charaxes prettejohni Collins, 1990 (endemic)
- Charaxes chunguensis White & Grant, 1986 (endemic)
- Charaxes grahamei van Someren, 19696 (endemic)
- Charaxes mccleeryi van Someren, 1972 (endemic)

==== Euxanthini ====
- Charaxes crossleyi ansorgei (Rothschild, 1903)
- Charaxes crossleyi magnifica (Rebel, 1914)
- Charaxes wakefieldi (Ward, 1873)
- Charaxes tiberius (Grose-Smith, 1889)

==== Pallini ====
- Palla publius kigoma van Someren, 1975
- Palla ussheri interposita Joicey & Talbot, 1925

=== Apaturinae ===
- Apaturopsis cleochares cleochares (Hewitson, 1873)
- Apaturopsis cleochares schultzei Schmidt, 1921

=== Nymphalinae ===
- Kallimoides rumia rattrayi (Sharpe, 1904)
- Vanessula milca latifasciata Joicey & Talbot, 1928

==== Nymphalini ====
- Antanartia delius (Drury, 1782)
- Antanartia schaeneia dubia Howarth, 1966
- Vanessa dimorphica (Howarth, 1966)
- Vanessa abyssinica jacksoni Howarth, 1966
- Vanessa cardui (Linnaeus, 1758)
- Junonia artaxia Hewitson, 1864
- Junonia chorimene (Guérin-Méneville, 1844)
- Junonia hierta cebrene Trimen, 1870
- Junonia natalica (Felder & Felder, 1860)
- Junonia oenone (Linnaeus, 1758)
- Junonia orithya madagascariensis Guenée, 1865
- Junonia sophia infracta Butler, 1888
- Junonia gregorii Butler, 1896
- Junonia terea elgiva Hewitson, 1864
- Junonia terea tereoides (Butler, 1901)
- Junonia touhilimasa Vuillot, 1892
- Junonia westermanni splendens (Schmidt, 1921)
- Junonia westermanni suffusa (Rothschild & Jordan, 1903)
- Junonia ansorgei (Rothschild, 1899)
- Junonia cymodoce lugens (Schultze, 1912)
- Salamis cacta cacta (Fabricius, 1793)
- Salamis cacta amaniensis Vosseler, 1907
- Protogoniomorpha anacardii nebulosa (Trimen, 1881)
- Protogoniomorpha parhassus (Drury, 1782)
- Protogoniomorpha temora temora (Felder & Felder, 1867)
- Protogoniomorpha temora virescens (Suffert, 1904)
- Precis actia Distant, 1880
- Precis antilope (Feisthamel, 1850)
- Precis ceryne (Boisduval, 1847)
- Precis cuama (Hewitson, 1864)
- Precis limnoria taveta Rogenhofer, 1891
- Precis pelarga (Fabricius, 1775)
- Precis rauana (Grose-Smith, 1898)
- Precis sinuata sinuata Plötz, 1880
- Precis sinuata hecqui Berger, 1981
- Precis tugela aurorina (Butler, 1894)
- Precis tugela pyriformis (Butler, 1896)
- Hypolimnas antevorta (Distant, 1880) (endemic)
- Hypolimnas anthedon anthedon (Doubleday, 1845)
- Hypolimnas anthedon wahlbergi (Wallengren, 1857)
- Hypolimnas deceptor (Trimen, 1873)
- Hypolimnas dinarcha grandis Rothschild, 1918
- Hypolimnas misippus (Linnaeus, 1764)
- Hypolimnas monteironis major Rothschild, 1918
- Hypolimnas salmacis magnifica Rothschild, 1918
- Hypolimnas usambara (Ward, 1872)
- Catacroptera cloanthe (Stoll, 1781)

=== Cyrestinae ===
==== Cyrestini ====
- Cyrestis camillus camillus (Fabricius, 1781)
- Cyrestis camillus sublineata Lathy, 1901

=== Biblidinae ===
==== Biblidini ====
- Byblia anvatara acheloia (Wallengren, 1857)
- Byblia anvatara crameri Aurivillius, 1894
- Byblia ilithyia (Drury, 1773)
- Mesoxantha ethosea reducta Rothschild, 1918
- Ariadne enotrea archeri Carcasson, 1958
- Ariadne enotrea suffusa (Joicey & Talbot, 1921)
- Ariadne pagenstecheri (Suffert, 1904)
- Neptidopsis fulgurata platyptera Rothschild & Jordan, 1903
- Neptidopsis ophione nucleata Grünberg, 1911
- Eurytela dryope angulata Aurivillius, 1899
- Eurytela hiarbas hiarbas (Drury, 1782)
- Eurytela hiarbas lita Rothschild & Jordan, 1903

==== Epicaliini ====
- Sevenia amulia benguelae (Chapman, 1872)
- Sevenia boisduvali boisduvali (Wallengren, 1857)
- Sevenia boisduvali omissa (Rothschild, 1918)
- Sevenia dubiosa (Strand, 1911)
- Sevenia garega (Karsch, 1892)
- Sevenia morantii (Trimen, 1881)
- Sevenia natalensis (Boisduval, 1847)
- Sevenia occidentalium (Mabille, 1876)
- Sevenia pechueli rhodesiana (Rothschild, 1918)
- Sevenia pseudotrimeni (Kielland, 1985) (endemic)
- Sevenia rosa (Hewitson, 1877)
- Sevenia umbrina (Karsch, 1892)

=== Limenitinae ===
==== Limenitidini ====
- Harma theobene blassi (Weymer, 1892)
- Harma theobene superna (Fox, 1968)
- Cymothoe amaniensis Rydon, 1980 (endemic)
- Cymothoe aurivillii aurivillii Staudinger, 1899 (endemic)
- Cymothoe aurivillii handeni Rydon, 1996 (endemic)
- Cymothoe aurivillii latifasciata Rydon, 1996 (endemic)
- Cymothoe aurivillii nguru Rydon, 1996 (endemic)
- Cymothoe aurivillii tenuifasciae Rydon, 1996 (endemic)
- Cymothoe caenis (Drury, 1773)
- Cymothoe collinsi Rydon, 1980 (endemic)
- Cymothoe coranus coranus Grose-Smith, 1889
- Cymothoe coranus kiellandi Beaurain, 1988
- Cymothoe cottrelli cottrelli Rydon, 1980
- Cymothoe cottrelli njombe Rydon, 1996
- Cymothoe confusa Aurivillius, 1887
- Cymothoe herminia johnstoni (Butler, 1902)
- Cymothoe hobarti hobarti Butler, 1900
- Cymothoe hobarti lactanganyikae Collins, 1990
- Cymothoe lurida azumai Carcasson, 1964
- Cymothoe lurida butleri Grünberg, 1908
- Cymothoe magambae magambae Rydon, 1980 (endemic)
- Cymothoe magambae pareensis Rydon, 1996 (endemic)
- Pseudoneptis bugandensis Stoneham, 1935
- Pseudacraea boisduvalii boisduvalii (Doubleday, 1845)
- Pseudacraea boisduvalii pemba Kielland, 1990
- Pseudacraea boisduvalii trimenii Butler, 1874
- Pseudacraea deludens amaurina Neustetter, 1928
- Pseudacraea deludens morogoro Kielland, 1990
- Pseudacraea deludens reducta Kielland, 1990
- Pseudacraea deludens tanganyikae Kielland, 1990
- Pseudacraea dolomena usagarae Staudinger, 1891
- Pseudacraea eurytus eurytus (Linnaeus, 1758)
- Pseudacraea eurytus conradti Oberthür, 1893
- Pseudacraea lucretia expansa (Butler, 1878)
- Pseudacraea poggei (Dewitz, 1879)
- Pseudacraea semire (Cramer, 1779)

==== Neptidini ====
- Neptis agouale agouale Pierre-Baltus, 1978
- Neptis agouale parallela Collins & Larsen, 1996
- Neptis alta Overlaet, 1955
- Neptis aurivillii aurivillii Schultze, 1913
- Neptis aurivillii ufipa Kielland, 1990
- Neptis carcassoni Van Son, 1959
- Neptis carpenteri d'Abrera, 1980
- Neptis clarei Neave, 1904
- Neptis conspicua Neave, 1904
- Neptis constantiae Carcasson, 1961
- Neptis angusta Condamin, 1966
- Neptis exaleuca suffusa Rothschild, 1918
- Neptis goochii Trimen, 1879
- Neptis gratiosa Overlaet, 1955
- Neptis incongrua incongrua Butler, 1896
- Neptis incongrua isidoro Kielland, 1985
- Neptis incongrua nguru Kielland, 1987
- Neptis jordani Neave, 1910
- Neptis kikuyuensis Jackson, 1951
- Neptis kiriakoffi Overlaet, 1955
- Neptis livingstonei Suffert, 1904 (endemic)
- Neptis metella (Doubleday, 1848)
- Neptis morosa Overlaet, 1955
- Neptis nemetes margueriteae Fox, 1968
- Neptis nicobule Holland, 1892
- Neptis nicoteles Hewitson, 1874
- Neptis nina Staudinger, 1896
- Neptis occidentalis Rothschild, 1918
- Neptis ochracea ochracea Neave, 1904
- Neptis ochracea reductata Larsen, 1995
- Neptis ochracea uluguru Kielland, 1985
- Neptis penningtoni van Son, 1977
- Neptis puella Aurivillius, 1894
- Neptis rogersi Eltringham, 1921
- Neptis serena Overlaet, 1955
- Neptis strigata kakamega Collins & Larsen, 1996
- Neptis trigonophora trigonophora Butler, 1878
- Neptis trigonophora melicertula Strand, 1912

==== Adoliadini ====
- Catuna angustatum (Felder & Felder, 1867)
- Catuna crithea (Drury, 1773)
- Catuna oberthueri Karsch, 1894
- Catuna sikorana Rogenhofer, 1889
- Euryphura achlys (Hopffer, 1855)
- Euryphura chalcis chalcis (Felder & Felder, 1860)
- Euryphura chalcis kiellandi Hecq, 1990
- Euryphura concordia (Hopffer, 1855)
- Pseudargynnis hegemone (Godart, 1819)
- Aterica galene extensa Heron, 1909
- Aterica galene theophane Hopffer, 1855
- Cynandra opis bernardii Lagnel, 1967
- Euriphene conjungens kiellandi Hecq, 1994
- Euriphene iris (Aurivillius, 1903)
- Euriphene obsoleta munene Hecq, 1994
- Euriphene ribensis (Ward, 1871)
- Euriphene saphirina saphirina (Karsch, 1894)
- Euriphene saphirina itanii (Carcasson, 1964)
- Euriphene saphirina memoria Hecq, 1994
- Euriphene tadema nigropunctata (Aurivillius, 1901)
- Bebearia carshena (Hewitson, 1871)
- Bebearia absolon entebbiae (Lathy, 1906)
- Bebearia cocalia badiana (Rbel, 1914)
- Bebearia cocalia katera (van Someren, 1939)
- Bebearia orientis orientis (Karsch, 1895)
- Bebearia orientis insularis Kielland, 1985
- Bebearia sophus audeoudi (Riley, 1936)
- Bebearia sophus ochreata (Carcasson, 1961)
- Bebearia plistonax (Hewitson, 1874)
- Bebearia phantasiella simulata (van Someren, 1939)
- Bebearia chriemhilda (Staudinger, 1896)
- Bebearia kiellandi Hecq, 1993 (endemic)
- Euphaedra medon innotata Holland, 1920
- Euphaedra medon neustetteri Niepelt, 1915
- Euphaedra zaddachii crawshayi Butler, 1895
- Euphaedra hollandi Hecq, 1974
- Euphaedra diffusa Gaede, 1916
- Euphaedra phosphor Joicey & Talbot, 1921
- Euphaedra uganda minzuru Hecq, 1992
- Euphaedra paradoxa Neave, 1904
- Euphaedra alacris Hecq, 1978
- Euphaedra cooksoni Druce, 1905
- Euphaedra confina Hecq, 1992 (endemic)
- Euphaedra castanoides Hecq, 1985
- Euphaedra orientalis Rothschild, 1898
- Euphaedra ruspina (Hewitson, 1865)
- Euphaedra harpalyce spatiosa (Mabille, 1876)
- Euphaedra neophron neophron (Hopffer, 1855)
- Euphaedra neophron littoralis Talbot, 1929
- Euphaedra neophron violaceae (Butler, 1888)
- Euphaedra neophron kiellandi Hecq, 1985
- Euphaedra neophron rydoni Howarth, 1969
- Euptera elabontas elabontas (Hewitson, 1871)
- Euptera elabontas mweruensis Neave, 1910
- Euptera hirundo lufirensis Joicey & Talbot, 1921
- Euptera kinugnana (Grose-Smith, 1889)
- Pseudathyma cyrili Chovet, 2002
- Pseudathyma lucretioides rondo Kielland, 1987
- Pseudathyma plutonica plutonica Butler, 1902
- Pseudathyma plutonica expansa Kielland, 1978
- Pseudathyma uluguru uluguru Kielland, 1985 (endemic)
- Pseudathyma uluguru abriana Collins, 2002 (endemic)

=== Heliconiinae ===
==== Acraeini ====
- Acraea cerasa cerasa Hewitson, 1861
- Acraea cerasa cerita Sharpe, 1906
- Acraea cerasa kiellandi Carcasson, 1964
- Acraea acara Hewitson, 1865
- Acraea anemosa Hewitson, 1865
- Acraea boopis ama Pierre, 1979
- Acraea chilo Godman, 1880
- Acraea cuva Grose-Smith, 1889
- Acraea endoscota Le Doux, 1928
- Acraea hamata Joicey & Talbot, 1922
- Acraea insignis Distant, 1880
- Acraea kappa Pierre, 1979 (endemic)
- Acraea leucographa Ribbe, 1889
- Acraea machequena Grose-Smith, 1887
- Acraea neobule Doubleday, 1847
- Acraea pseudolycia astrigera Butler, 1899
- Acraea punctimarginea Pinhey, 1956 (endemic)
- Acraea quirina quirina (Fabricius, 1781)
- Acraea quirina rosa Eltringham, 1912
- Acraea rabbaiae Ward, 1873
- Acraea satis Ward, 1871
- Acraea zonata Hewitson, 1877
- Acraea acrita Hewitson, 1865
- Acraea asema Hewitson, 1877
- Acraea bergeriana Pierre, 1979 (endemic)
- Acraea chaeribula Oberthür, 1893
- Acraea egina areca Mabille, 1889
- Acraea egina pembanus Kielland, 1990
- Acraea guillemei Oberthür, 1893
- Acraea manca Thurau, 1904 (endemic)
- Acraea periphanes Oberthür, 1893
- Acraea petraea Boisduval, 1847
- Acraea pudorina Staudinger, 1885
- Acraea punctellata Eltringham, 1912
- Acraea rohlfsi Suffert, 1904 (endemic)
- Acraea utengulensis Thurau, 1903
- Acraea asboloplintha Karsch, 1894
- Acraea braesia Godman, 1885
- Acraea caecilia caecilia (Fabricius, 1781)
- Acraea caecilia pudora Aurivillius, 1910
- Acraea caldarena caldarena Hewitson, 1877
- Acraea caldarena neluska Oberthür, 1878
- Acraea equatorialis equatorialis Neave, 1904
- Acraea equatorialis anaemia Eltringham, 1912
- Acraea leucopyga Aurivillius, 1904
- Acraea lygus Druce, 1875
- Acraea natalica Boisduval, 1847
- Acraea pseudegina Westwood, 1852
- Acraea pudorella Aurivillius, 1899
- Acraea stenobea Wallengren, 1860
- Acraea sykesi Sharpe, 1902
- Acraea kia Pierre, 1990 (endemic)
- Acraea adrasta Weymer, 1892
- Acraea aganice montana (Butler, 1888)
- Acraea aganice nicega (Suffert, 1904)
- Acraea alcinoe camerunica (Aurivillius, 1893)
- Acraea consanguinea albicolor (Karsch, 1895)
- Acraea epaea epaea (Cramer, 1779)
- Acraea epaea epitellus Staudinger, 1896
- Acraea epaea melina (Thurau, 1903)
- Acraea epaea paragea (Grose-Smith, 1900)
- Acraea epiprotea (Butler, 1874)
- Acraea macarista (Sharpe, 1906)
- Acraea poggei poggei Dewitz, 1879
- Acraea poggei nelsoni Grose-Smith & Kirby, 1892
- Acraea quadricolor quadricolor (Rogenhofer, 1891)
- Acraea quadricolor itumbana (Jordan, 1910)
- Acraea quadricolor latifasciata (Sharpe, 1892)
- Acraea quadricolor leptis (Jordan, 1910)
- Acraea quadricolor mahale (Kielland, 1990)
- Acraea quadricolor morogoro (Carpenter & Jackson, 1950)
- Acraea quadricolor uluguru (Kielland, 1990)
- Acraea scalivittata scalivittata (Butler, 1896)
- Acraea scalivittata kiellandianus Koçak, 1996
- Acraea tellus eumelis (Jordan, 1910)
- Acraea umbra macarioides (Aurivillius, 1893)
- Acraea vestalis congoensis (Le Doux, 1937)
- Acraea acerata Hewitson, 1874
- Acraea acuta Howarth, 1969
- Acraea ngorongoro Kielland, 1990
- Acraea nigromaculata Kielland, 1990
- Acraea rubrobasalis Kielland, 1990
- Acraea alciopoides Joicey & Talbot, 1921
- Acraea alicia alicia (Sharpe, 1890)
- Acraea alicia mbulu Kielland, 1990
- Acraea alicia uzungwae Kielland, 1990
- Acraea althoffi neavei Poulton, 1924
- Acraea amicitiae Heron, 1909
- Acraea aurivillii Staudinger, 1896
- Acraea baxteri baxteri Sharpe, 1902
- Acraea baxteri oldeani Kielland, 1990
- Acraea baxteri subsquamia Thurau, 1903
- Acraea bonasia (Fabricius, 1775)
- Acraea cabira Hopffer, 1855
- Acraea encedana Pierre, 1976
- Acraea serena (Fabricius, 1775)
- Acraea esebria Hewitson, 1861
- Acraea excelsior Sharpe, 1891
- Acraea goetzei Thurau, 1903
- Acraea humilis Sharpe, 1897
- Acraea iturina Grose-Smith, 1890
- Acraea johnstoni Godman, 1885
- Acraea kalinzu Carpenter, 1936
- Acraea lycoa Godart, 1819
- Acraea oberthueri Butler, 1895
- Acraea orestia orestia Hewitson, 1874
- Acraea orestia sambar Stoneham, 1943
- Acraea pentapolis epidica Oberthür, 1893
- Acraea pharsalus pharsalus Ward, 1871
- Acraea pharsalus pharsaloides Holland, 1892
- Acraea sotikensis Sharpe, 1892
- Acraea ventura ventura Hewitson, 1877
- Acraea ventura ochrascens Sharpe, 1902
- Acraea viviana Staudinger, 1896
- Acraea vuilloti Mabille, 1889 (endemic)
- Acraea bomba Grose-Smith, 1889
- Acraea lusinga Overlaet, 1955
- Acraea rahira rahira Boisduval, 1833
- Acraea rahira mufindi Kielland, 1990
- Acraea aubyni Eltringham, 1912
- Acraea cinerea Neave, 1904
- Acraea conradti Oberthür, 1893
- Acraea igola Trimen & Bowker, 1889
- Acraea ntebiae ntebiae Sharpe, 1897
- Acraea ntebiae kigoma Kielland, 1978
- Acraea oreas Sharpe, 1891
- Acraea orinata Oberthür, 1893
- Acraea parrhasia orientis Aurivillius, 1904
- Acraea penelope Staudinger, 1896
- Acraea perenna thesprio Oberthür, 1893
- Acraea quirinalis Grose-Smith, 1900
- Acraea semivitrea Aurivillius, 1895
- Acraea kuekenthali Le Doux, 1922
- Acraea lyci Pierre, 2006 (endemic)

==== Argynnini ====
- Issoria smaragdifera reducta Carcasson, 1961
- Issoria baumanni katangae (Neave, 1910)
- Issoria baumanni orientalis Kielland, 1990
- Issoria hanningtoni (Elwes, 1889)

==== Vagrantini ====
- Lachnoptera anticlia (Hübner, 1819)
- Lachnoptera ayresii Trimen, 1879
- Phalanta eurytis (Doubleday, 1847)
- Phalanta phalantha aethiopica (Rothschild & Jordan, 1903)

== Hesperiidae ==
=== Coeliadinae ===
- Coeliades anchises (Gerstaecker, 1871)
- Coeliades chalybe (Westwood, 1852)
- Coeliades forestan (Stoll, [1782])
- Coeliades hanno (Plötz, 1879)
- Coeliades keithloa kenya Evans, 1937
- Coeliades pisistratus (Fabricius, 1793)
- Coeliades sejuncta (Mabille & Vuillot, 1891)

=== Pyrginae ===
==== Celaenorrhinini ====
- Celaenorrhinus bettoni Butler, 1902
- Celaenorrhinus boadicea howarthi Berger, 1976
- Celaenorrhinus cordeironis Kielland, 1992 (endemic)
- Celaenorrhinus galenus biseriata (Butler, 1888)
- Celaenorrhinus handmani Collins & Congdon, 1998
- Celaenorrhinus homeyeri (Plötz, 1880)
- Celaenorrhinus intermixtus evansi Berger, 1975
- Celaenorrhinus kimboza Evans, 1949 (endemic)
- Celaenorrhinus meditrina (Hewitson, 1877)
- Celaenorrhinus perlustris Rebel, 1914
- Celaenorrhinus proxima (Mabille, 1877)
- Celaenorrhinus rubeho Kielland, 1990 (endemic)
- Celaenorrhinus sanjeensis Kielland, 1990 (endemic)
- Celaenorrhinus uluguru Kielland, 1990 (endemic)
- Celaenorrhinus zanqua Evans, 1937
- Eretis djaelaelae (Wallengren, 1857)
- Eretis herewardi Riley, 1921
- Eretis lugens (Rogenhofer, 1891)
- Eretis melania Mabille, 1891
- Eretis mitiana Evans, 1937
- Eretis umbra maculifera Mabille & Boullet, 1916
- Eretis vaga Evans, 1937
- Sarangesa astrigera Butler, 1894
- Sarangesa aza Evans, 1951
- Sarangesa bouvieri (Mabille, 1877)
- Sarangesa brigida atra Evans, 1937
- Sarangesa haplopa Swinhoe, 1907
- Sarangesa laelius (Mabille, 1877)
- Sarangesa maculata (Mabille, 1891)
- Sarangesa phidyle (Walker, 1870)
- Sarangesa princei Karsch, 1896
- Sarangesa ruona Evans, 1937
- Sarangesa thecla mabira Evans, 1956
- Sarangesa tricerata compacta Evans, 1951

==== Tagiadini ====
- Tagiades flesus (Fabricius, 1781)
- Eagris decastigma purpura Evans, 1937
- Eagris lucetia (Hewitson, 1875)
- Eagris nottoana (Wallengren, 1857)
- Eagris sabadius astoria Holland, 1896
- Eagris sabadius ochreana Lathy, 1901
- Calleagris hollandi (Butler, 1897)
- Calleagris jamesoni jamesoni (Sharpe, 1890)
- Calleagris jamesoni jacksoni Evans, 1951
- Calleagris lacteus (Mabille, 1877)
- Netrobalane canopus (Trimen, 1864)
- Leucochitonea amneris (Rebel & Rogenhofer, 1894) (endemic)
- Abantis arctomarginata Lathy, 1901
- Abantis bamptoni Collins & Larsen, 1994
- Abantis leucogaster iruma Evans, 1951
- Abantis paradisea (Butler, 1870)
- Abantis tettensis Hopffer, 1855
- Abantis venosa Trimen & Bowker, 1889
- Abantis zambesiaca (Westwood, 1874)

==== Carcharodini ====
- Spialia colotes transvaaliae (Trimen & Bowker, 1889)
- Spialia confusa confusa Evans, 1937
- Spialia confusa obscura Evans, 1937
- Spialia depauperata (Strand, 1911)
- Spialia mafa higginsi Evans, 1937
- Spialia ploetzi (Aurivillius, 1891)
- Spialia secessus (Trimen, 1891)
- Spialia zebra bifida (Higgins, 1924)

=== Hesperiinae ===
==== Aeromachini ====
- Astictopterus bruno (Evans, 1937) (endemic)
- Astictopterus punctulata (Butler, 1895)
- Astictopterus stellata amania Evans, 1947
- Astictopterus stellata mineni (Trimen, 1894)
- Astictopterus tura Evans, 1951 (endemic)
- Prosopalpus debilis (Plötz, 1879)
- Prosopalpus saga Evans, 1937
- Prosopalpus styla Evans, 1937
- Ampittia capenas (Hewitson, 1868)
- Ampittia parva Aurivillius, 1925 (endemic)
- Ampittia kilombero Larsen & Congdon, 2012
- Kedestes barberae (Trimen, 1873)
- Kedestes brunneostriga (Plötz, 1884)
- Kedestes callicles (Hewitson, 1868)
- Kedestes mohozutza (Wallengren, 1857)
- Kedestes nerva paola Plötz, 1884
- Kedestes protensa Butler, 1901
- Kedestes rogersi Druce, 1907
- Kedestes wallengrenii (Trimen, 1883)
- Kedestes fenestratus (Butler, 1894)
- Gorgyra afikpo Druce, 1909
- Gorgyra aretina (Hewitson, 1878)
- Gorgyra bibulus Riley, 1929
- Gorgyra bina Evans, 1937
- Gorgyra diva Evans, 1937
- Gorgyra johnstoni (Butler, 1894)
- Gorgyra kalinzu Evans, 1949
- Gorgyra mocquerysii Holland, 1896
- Gorgyra vosseleri Grünberg, 1907 (endemic)
- Gorgyra subflavidus Holland, 1896
- Teniorhinus harona (Westwood, 1881)
- Teniorhinus herilus (Hopffer, 1855)
- Teniorhinus ignita (Mabille, 1877)
- Ceratrichia bonga Evans, 1947 (endemic)
- Ceratrichia brunnea Bethune-Baker, 1906
- Ceratrichia clara medea Evans, 1937
- Ceratrichia hollandi Bethune-Baker, 1908
- Ceratrichia mabirensis Riley, 1925
- Ceratrichia semilutea Mabille, 1891
- Ceratrichia semlikensis Joicey & Talbot, 1921
- Ceratrichia wollastoni Heron, 1909
- Pardaleodes bule Holland, 1896
- Pardaleodes fan (Holland, 1894)
- Pardaleodes incerta (Snellen, 1872)
- Pardaleodes sator pusiella Mabille, 1877
- Xanthodisca vibius (Hewitson, 1878)
- Acada biseriata (Mabille, 1893)
- Osmodes adon (Mabille, 1890)
- Osmodes adonia Evans, 1937
- Osmodes adosus (Mabille, 1890)
- Osmodes banghaasii Holland, 1896
- Osmodes costatus Aurivillius, 1896
- Osmodes distincta Holland, 1896
- Osmodes hollandi Evans, 1937
- Osmodes omar Swinhoe, 1916
- Osmodes thora (Plötz, 1884)
- Parosmodes morantii morantii (Trimen, 1873)
- Parosmodes morantii axis Evans, 1937
- Paracleros biguttulus (Mabille, 1890)
- Paracleros sangoanus (Carcasson, 1964)
- Paracleros substrigata (Holland, 1893)
- Acleros mackenii instabilis Mabille, 1890
- Acleros neavei Evans, 1937
- Acleros nigrapex Strand, 1913
- Acleros ploetzi Mabille, 1890
- Semalea arela (Mabille, 1891)
- Semalea pulvina (Plötz, 1879)
- Semalea sextilis (Plötz, 1886)
- Hypoleucis ophiusa ophir Evans, 1937
- Meza cybeutes (Holland, 1894)
- Meza larea (Neave, 1910)
- Paronymus budonga (Evans, 1938)
- Paronymus xanthias kiellandi Congdon & Collins, 1998
- Andronymus bjornstadi Congdon, Kielland & Collins, 1998 (endemic)
- Andronymus caesar philander (Hopffer, 1855)
- Andronymus gander Evans, 1947
- Andronymus hero Evans, 1937
- Andronymus neander (Plötz, 1884)
- Chondrolepis niveicornis (Plötz, 1883)
- Chondrolepis obscurior de Jong, 1986 (endemic)
- Chondrolepis uluguru Larsen & Congdon, 2012
- Chondrolepis similis de Jong, 1986 (endemic)
- Chondrolepis telisignata (Butler, 1896)
- Chondrolepis uluguru T.B. Larsen & Congdon, 2012
- Zophopetes ganda Evans, 1937
- Zophopetes nobilior (Holland, 1896)
- Gamia buchholzi (Plötz, 1879)
- Gamia shelleyi (Sharpe, 1890)
- Artitropa erinnys ehlersi Karsch, 1896
- Artitropa milleri Riley, 1925
- Artitropa reducta Aurivillius, 1925
- Artitropa usambarae Congdon, Kielland, & Collins, 1998 (endemic)
- Gretna balenge (Holland, 1891)
- Gretna carmen carmen Evans, 1937
- Gretna carmen capra Evans, 1937
- Gretna cylinda (Hewitson, 1876)
- Pteroteinon capronnieri (Plötz, 1879)
- Pteroteinon ceucaenira (Druce, 1910)
- Pteroteinon concaenira Belcastro & Larsen, 1996
- Leona leonora leonora (Plötz, 1879)
- Leona leonora dux Evans, 1937
- Leona halma Evans, 1937
- Leona luehderi laura Evans, 1937
- Caenides kangvensis Holland, 1896
- Caenides dacela (Hewitson, 1876)
- Caenides hidaroides Aurivillius, 1896
- Caenides dacena (Hewitson, 1876)
- Monza alberti (Holland, 1896)
- Monza cretacea (Snellen, 1872)
- Monza punctata punctata (Aurivillius, 1910)
- Monza punctata crola Evans, 1937
- Melphina tarace (Mabille, 1891)
- Fresna cojo (Karsch, 1893)
- Fresna netopha (Hewitson, 1878)
- Fresna nyassae (Hewitson, 1878)
- Platylesches affinissima Strand, 1921
- Platylesches fosta Evans, 1937
- Platylesches galesa (Hewitson, 1877)
- Platylesches langa Evans, 1937
- Platylesches larseni Kielland, 1992 (endemic)
- Platylesches panga Evans, 1937
- Platylesches picanini (Holland, 1894)
- Platylesches rasta Evans, 1937
- Platylesches robustus Neave, 1910

==== Baorini ====
- Brusa saxicola (Neave, 1910)
- Zenonia anax Evans, 1937
- Borbo chagwa (Evans, 1937)
- Borbo fallax (Gaede, 1916)
- Borbo fanta (Evans, 1937)
- Borbo ferruginea (Aurivillius, 1925)
- Borbo holtzi (Plötz, 1883)
- Borbo lugens (Hopffer, 1855)
- Borbo perobscura (Druce, 1912)
- Borbo sirena (Evans, 1937)

=== Heteropterinae ===
- Metisella abdeli (Krüger, 1928)
- Metisella carsoni (Butler, 1898)
- Metisella congdoni de Jong & Kielland, 1983 (endemic)
- Metisella decipiens (Butler, 1896)
- Metisella formosus linda Evans, 1937
- Metisella formosus nyanza Evans, 1937
- Metisella kambove (Neave, 1910)
- Metisella medea medea Evans, 1937
- Metisella medea nyika Evans, 1937
- Metisella midas (Butler, 1894)
- Metisella perexcellens marunga Evans, 1937
- Metisella perexcellens sitebi Kielland, 1982
- Metisella quadrisignatus (Butler, 1894)
- Metisella trisignatus tanga Evans, 1937
- Metisella willemi (Wallengren, 1857)
- Tsitana wallacei (Neave, 1910)
- Lepella lepeletier (Latreille, 1824)

== See also ==
- List of moths of Tanzania
- Wildlife of Tanzania
