= Willema carsoni =

Scientific classification
- Kingdom: Animalia
- Phylum: Arthropoda
- Class: Insecta
- Order: Lepidoptera
- Family: Hesperiidae
- Genus: Willema
- Species: W. carsoni

Binomial name
- Willema carsoni (Butler, 1898)

Synonyms
- Cyclopides carsoni Butler, 1898; Metisella carsoni (Butler, 1898)

Species of butterfly

Willema carsoni is a species of butterfly in the family Hesperiidae. It is found in Tanzania (Fwambo and Kungwe) and north-eastern Zambia.
