= Harpendyreus marungensis =

Scientific classification
- Domain: Eukaryota
- Kingdom: Animalia
- Phylum: Arthropoda
- Class: Insecta
- Order: Lepidoptera
- Family: Lycaenidae
- Genus: Harpendyreus
- Species: H. marungensis

Binomial name
- Harpendyreus marungensis (Joicey & Talbot, 1924)

Synonyms
- Cyclirius aequatorialis marungensis Joicey & Talbot, 1924; Cyclyrius wollastoni Bethune-Baker, 1926

Species of butterfly

Harpendyreus marungensis, the central mountain blue, is a butterfly in the family Lycaenidae. It is found in Uganda, the Democratic Republic of the Congo, Rwanda, Kenya and Tanzania. The habitat consists of montane grassland, moist savanna and the edges of roads in forests.

== Subspecies ==
- Harpendyreus marungensis marungensis (Democratic Republic of the Congo: south-east to Tanganika, south-western Tanzania)
- Harpendyreus marungensis mangalisae Kielland, 1986 (Tanzania: Mpapwa district and north of the Ruaha Gorge)
- Harpendyreus marungensis wollastoni (Bethune-Baker, 1926) (Uganda, Rwanda, western Kenya)
