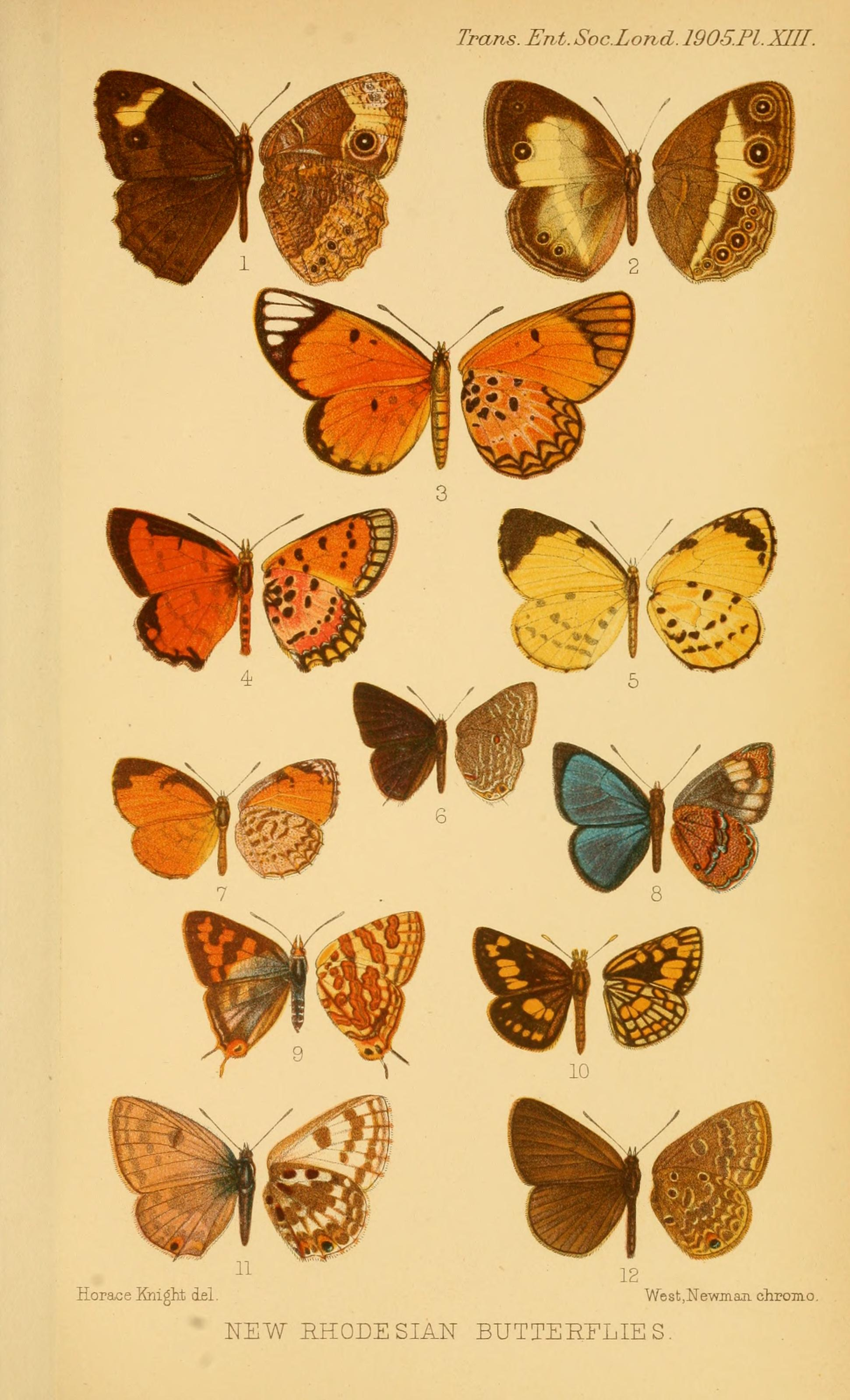
- Figure 7 accompanying the original description.

Scientific classification
- Kingdom: Animalia
- Phylum: Arthropoda
- Class: Insecta
- Order: Lepidoptera
- Family: Lycaenidae
- Genus: Liptena
- Species: L. eukrines

Binomial name
- Liptena eukrines H. H. Druce, 1905

Synonyms
- Liptena eukrines f. obsoleta Dufrane, 1953

= Liptena eukrines =

Species of butterfly

Liptena eukrines is a butterfly in the family Lycaenidae first described by Hamilton Herbert Druce in 1905. It is found in north-western Tanzania, the Democratic Republic of the Congo (Lualaba) and north-western Zambia. The habitat consists of forests.
