= Cymothoe magambae =

Scientific classification
- Kingdom: Animalia
- Phylum: Arthropoda
- Class: Insecta
- Order: Lepidoptera
- Family: Nymphalidae
- Genus: Cymothoe
- Species: C. magambae

Binomial name
- Cymothoe magambae Rydon, 1980

Species of butterfly

Cymothoe magambae is a butterfly in the family Nymphalidae. It is found in Tanzania. The habitat consists of montane forests at altitudes between 1,700 and 2,200 meters.

== Subspecies ==
- Cymothoe magambae magambae (Tanzania: north to the Magamba Forest)
- Cymothoe magambae pareensis Rydon, 1996 (Tanzania: South Pare Mountains)
