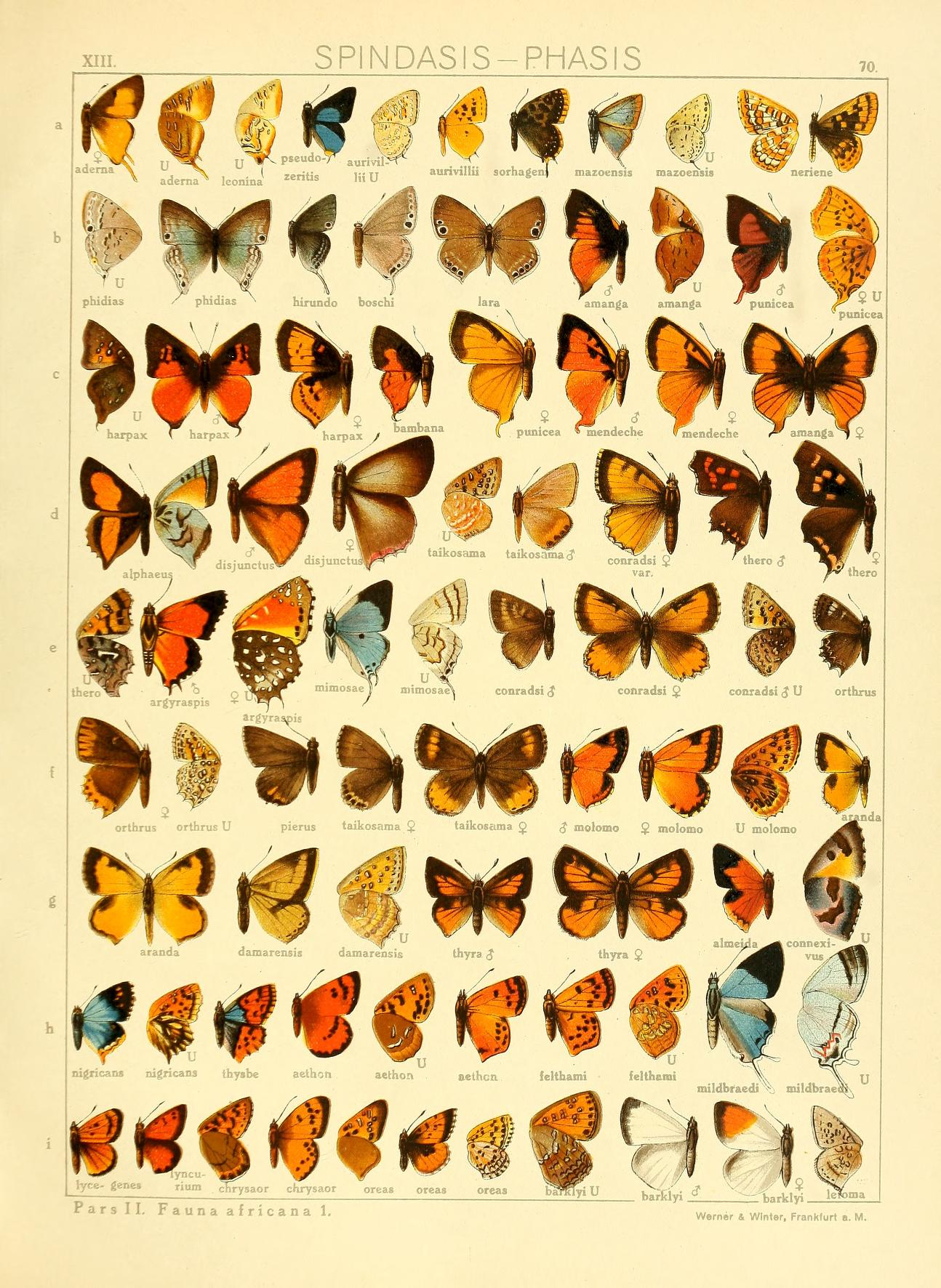

Scientific classification
- Domain: Eukaryota
- Kingdom: Animalia
- Phylum: Arthropoda
- Class: Insecta
- Order: Lepidoptera
- Family: Lycaenidae
- Genus: Aloeides
- Species: A. conradsi

Binomial name
- Aloeides conradsi (Aurivillius, 1907)

Synonyms
- Phasis conradsi Aurivillius, 1907; Phasis conradsi f. ochraceous Joicey and Talbot, 1924

= Aloeides conradsi =

Conrad's copper

Species of butterfly

Aloeides conradsi, the Conrad's copper, is a butterfly in the family Lycaenidae. It is found in Kenya, Tanzania, Malawi and Zambia. The habitat consists of savanna.

Both sexes are attracted to flowers.

== Subspecies ==
- A. c. conradsi (Tanzania)
- A. c. angoniensis Tite & Dickson, 1973 (Tanzania, Malawi, Zambia)
- A. c. jacksoni Tite & Dickson, 1973 (Tanzania, Kenya: east of the Rift Valley)
- A. c. talboti Tite & Dickson, 1973 (Tanzania, Kenya: west of the Rift Valley)
