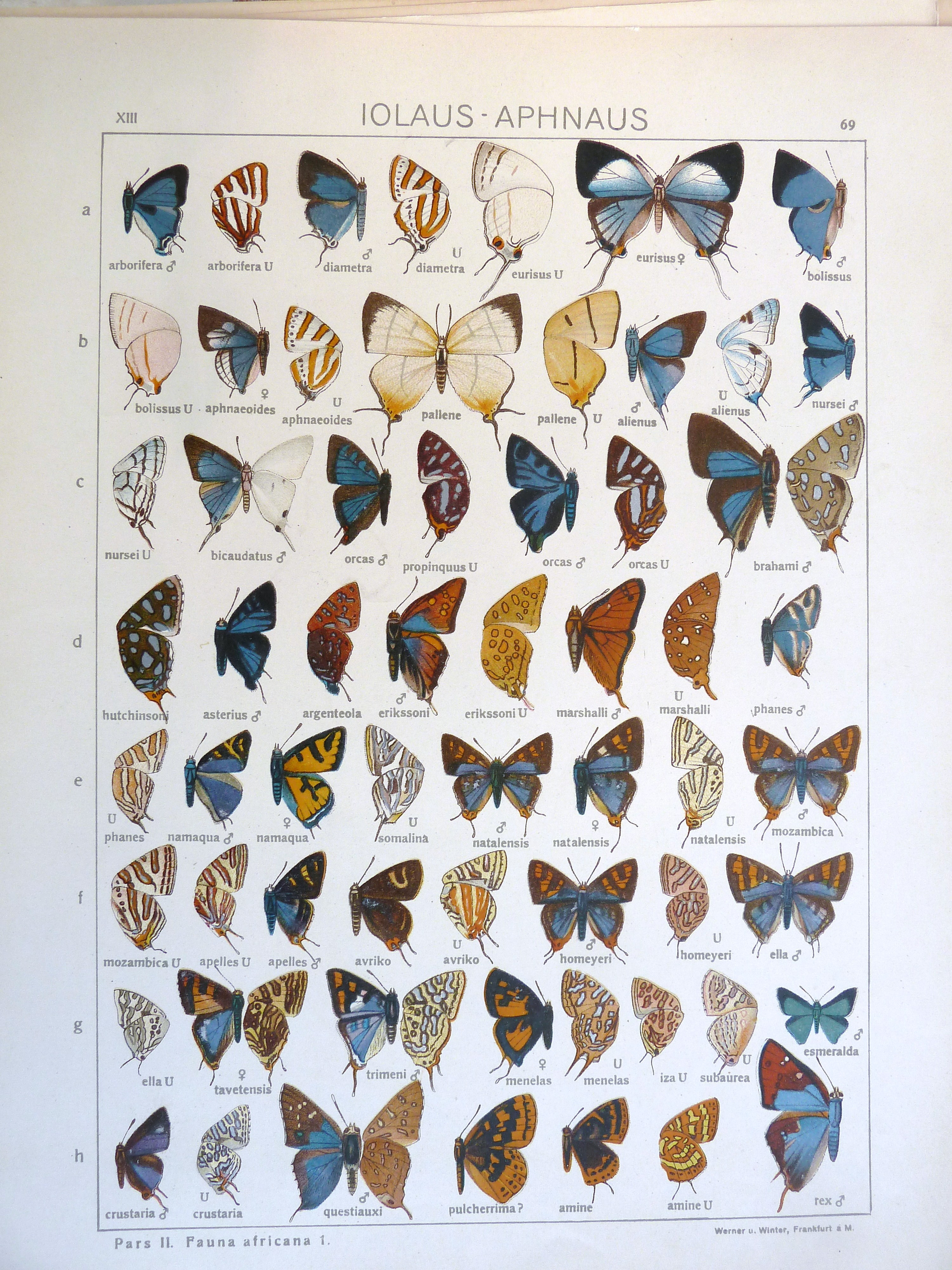
- Seitz Fauna Africana Taf69 (line a)

Conservation status
- Least Concern (IUCN 3.1)

Scientific classification
- Kingdom: Animalia
- Phylum: Arthropoda
- Class: Insecta
- Order: Lepidoptera
- Family: Lycaenidae
- Genus: Iolaus
- Species: I. diametra

Binomial name
- Iolaus diametra (Karsch, 1895)

Synonyms
- Epamera diametra Karsch, 1895; Epamera diametra littoralis Congdon & Collins, 1998; Epamera diametra zanzibarensis Congdon & Collins, 1998

= Iolaus diametra =

Species of butterfly

Iolaus diametra, the natal yellow-banded sapphire, is a butterfly of the family Lycaenidae. It is found in Africa, roughly from South Africa to Ethiopia.

The wingspan is 26–28 mm for males and 27–29 mm for females. Adults are on wing from July to December with a peak in October in South Africa. There is one generation per year.

The larvae of subspecies I. d. natalica feed on Actinanthella wylliei. Other recorded food plants are Oliverella hildebrandtii and Englerina woodfordioides.

== Subspecies ==
- I. d. diametra (northern Tanzania, eastern Kenya, southern Ethiopia)
- I. d. natalica Vári, 1976 (northern KwaZulu-Natal)
- I. d. littoralis (Congdon & Collins, 1998) (coast of Kenya, coast of Tanzania)
- I. d. zanzibarensis (Congdon & Collins, 1998) (Tanzania: Zanzibar)
