= Mylothris kilimensis =

Scientific classification
- Kingdom: Animalia
- Phylum: Arthropoda
- Clade: Pancrustacea
- Class: Insecta
- Order: Lepidoptera
- Family: Pieridae
- Genus: Mylothris
- Species: M. kilimensis

Binomial name
- Mylothris kilimensis Kielland, 1990

Species of butterfly

Mylothris kilimensis is a butterfly in the family Pieridae. It is found in Kenya and Tanzania. The habitat consists of submontane and montane forests.

The length of the forewings is 22–27 mm for males and 22.5-27.8 mm for females.

The larvae feed on Santalales species.

== Subspecies ==
- Mylothris kilimensis kilimensis (southern Kenya, north-eastern Tanzania)
- Mylothris kilimensis rondonis Kielland, 1990 (eastern Tanzania to the Rondo Plateau)
