= Willema perexcellens =

Scientific classification
- Kingdom: Animalia
- Phylum: Arthropoda
- Class: Insecta
- Order: Lepidoptera
- Family: Hesperiidae
- Genus: Willema
- Species: W. perexcellens

Binomial name
- Willema perexcellens (Butler, 1896)

Synonyms
- Cyclopides perexcellens Butler, 1896; Metisella perexcellens (Butler, 1896)

Species of butterfly

Willema perexcellens is a species of butterfly in the family Hesperiidae. It is found in Malawi and Tanzania.

== Subspecies ==
- Willema perexcellens perexcellens -Malawi: Kasungu Mountain
- Willema perexcellens marunga Evans, 1937 - Tanzania: Marung Plateau
- Willema perexcellens sitebi Kielland, 1982 - Tanzania: Mpanda district
