= Bicyclus uzungwensis =

Scientific classification
- Kingdom: Animalia
- Phylum: Arthropoda
- Clade: Pancrustacea
- Class: Insecta
- Order: Lepidoptera
- Family: Nymphalidae
- Genus: Bicyclus
- Species: B. uzungwensis

Binomial name
- Bicyclus uzungwensis Kielland, 1990

Species of butterfly

Bicyclus uzungwensis is a butterfly in the family Nymphalidae. It is found in Tanzania. The habitat consists of montane forests.

== Subspecies ==
- Bicyclus uzungwensis uzungwensis (Tanzania: central to Udzungwa Mountains)
- Bicyclus uzungwensis granti Kielland, 1990 (Tanzania: central to Rubeho Mountains)
