= Charaxes phenix =

Scientific classification
- Kingdom: Animalia
- Phylum: Arthropoda
- Class: Insecta
- Order: Lepidoptera
- Family: Nymphalidae
- Subfamily: Charaxinae
- Tribe: Charaxini
- Genus: Charaxes
- Species: C. phenix

Binomial name
- Charaxes phenix Turlin & Lequeux, 1993

Species of butterfly

Charaxes phenix is a butterfly in the family Nymphalidae. It is found in Tanzania. Holotype in Muséum national d'histoire naturelle.

== Subspecies ==
- Charaxes phenix phenix (Tanzania: Nguu Mountains)
- Charaxes phenix daniellae White, 1996 (Tanzania: Uzungwa Range)
