= Pseudathyma uluguru =

Scientific classification
- Kingdom: Animalia
- Phylum: Arthropoda
- Class: Insecta
- Order: Lepidoptera
- Family: Nymphalidae
- Genus: Pseudathyma
- Species: P. uluguru

Binomial name
- Pseudathyma uluguru Kielland, 1985

Species of butterfly

Pseudathyma uluguru is a butterfly in the family Nymphalidae. It is found in Tanzania. The habitat consists of montane forests.

== Subspecies ==
- Pseudathyma uluguru uluguru (Tanzania: Uluguru)
- Pseudathyma uluguru abriana Collins, 2002 (Tanzania)
