= Alaena caissa =

Scientific classification
- Kingdom: Animalia
- Phylum: Arthropoda
- Clade: Pancrustacea
- Class: Insecta
- Order: Lepidoptera
- Family: Lycaenidae
- Genus: Alaena
- Species: A. caissa

Binomial name
- Alaena caissa Rebel & Rogenhofer, 1894

Synonyms
- Alaena kagera Talbot, 1935

Species of Butterfly

Alaena caissa is a butterfly in the family Lycaenidae. It is found in Uganda and Tanzania. Its habitat consists of open, rocky areas.

== Subspecies ==
- Alaena caissa caissa (northern Tanzania)
- Alaena caissa kagera Talbot, 1935 (Tanzania: north-west to the Kagera and Bukoba Districts, Uganda: open areas west of Lake Victoria)
