= Metisella medea =

Scientific classification
- Kingdom: Animalia
- Phylum: Arthropoda
- Class: Insecta
- Order: Lepidoptera
- Family: Hesperiidae
- Genus: Metisella
- Species: M. medea

Binomial name
- Metisella medea Evans, 1937

Species of butterfly

Metisella medea, the Medea sylph, is a butterfly in the family Hesperiidae. It is found in Nigeria, Cameroon, the Democratic Republic of the Congo, Uganda, Kenya, Tanzania and Malawi. The habitat consists of submontane meadows.

The larvae feed on Poaceae species.

== Subspecies ==
- Metisella medea medea (Nigeria, Uganda, Kenya, Tanzania, eastern Democratic Republic of Congo)
- Metisella medea nyika Evans, 1937 (Tanzania: southern highlands, Malawi: Nyika Plateau)
