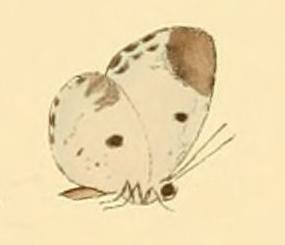

Scientific classification
- Kingdom: Animalia
- Phylum: Arthropoda
- Class: Insecta
- Order: Lepidoptera
- Family: Lycaenidae
- Genus: Tetrarhanis
- Species: T. ilma

Binomial name
- Tetrarhanis ilma (Hewitson, 1873)

Synonyms
- Liptena ilma Hewitson, 1873; Liptena ilma daltoni Poulton, 1929; Liptena ilma lathyi Joicey & Talbot, 1921; Liptena (Tetrarhanis) ilma ugandae Stempffer, 1964

= Tetrarhanis ilma =

Species of butterfly

Tetrarhanis ilma is a butterfly in the family Lycaenidae. It is found in the Democratic Republic of the Congo, Angola, Uganda, Kenya and Tanzania. The habitat consists of primary forests.

== Subspecies ==
- T. i. ilma (Congo, Angola, Democratic Republic of the Congo: Mayumbe, Uele, Ituri, Tshopo, Equateur, Kinshasa, Sankuru, Lualaba and Shaba)
- T. i. daltoni (Poulton, 1929) (south-western Uganda, north-western Tanzania)
- T. i. lathyi (Joicey & Talbot, 1921) (Democratic Republic of the Congo: Kivu, Tanzania)
- T. i. ugandae (Stempffer, 1964) (Uganda, western Kenya, north-western Tanzania)
