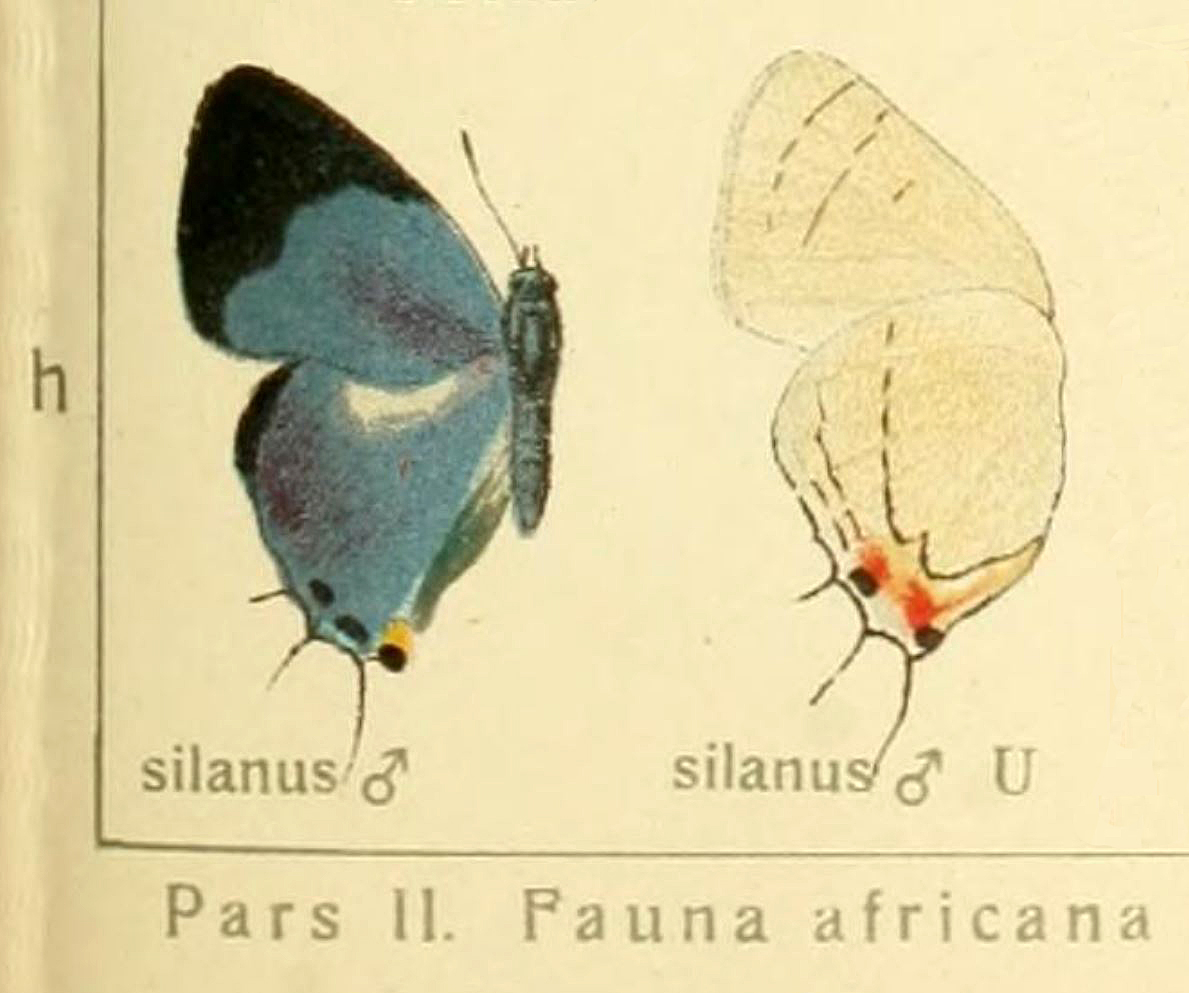

Scientific classification
- Kingdom: Animalia
- Phylum: Arthropoda
- Class: Insecta
- Order: Lepidoptera
- Family: Lycaenidae
- Genus: Iolaus
- Species: I. silanus

Binomial name
- Iolaus silanus Grose-Smith, 1889

Synonyms
- Iolaus (Epamera) silanus; Epamera silanus alticola Stempffer, 1961; Epamera silanus rondo Congdon & Collins, 1998; Epamera silanus silenus Hawker-Smith, 1928; Epamera silanus zanzibarica Congdon & Collins, 1998

= Iolaus silanus =

Species of butterfly

Iolaus silanus, the three-tailed sapphire, is a butterfly in the family Lycaenidae. It is found in Kenya, Tanzania and the Democratic Republic of the Congo. The habitat consists of forests.

The larvae feed on Agelanthus subulatus and Agelanthus sansibarensis.

== Subspecies ==
- Iolaus silanus silanus (coast of Kenya, coast of Tanzania)
- Iolaus silanus alticola (Stempffer, 1961) (Tanzania: north-east to the Usambara Mountains)
- Iolaus silanus rondo (Congdon & Collins, 1998) (Tanzania)
- Iolaus silanus silenus (Hawker-Smith, 1928) (Democratic Republic of the Congo: Equateur and Lualaba)
- Iolaus silanus zanzibarica (Congdon & Collins, 1998) (Tanzania: Zanzibar)
