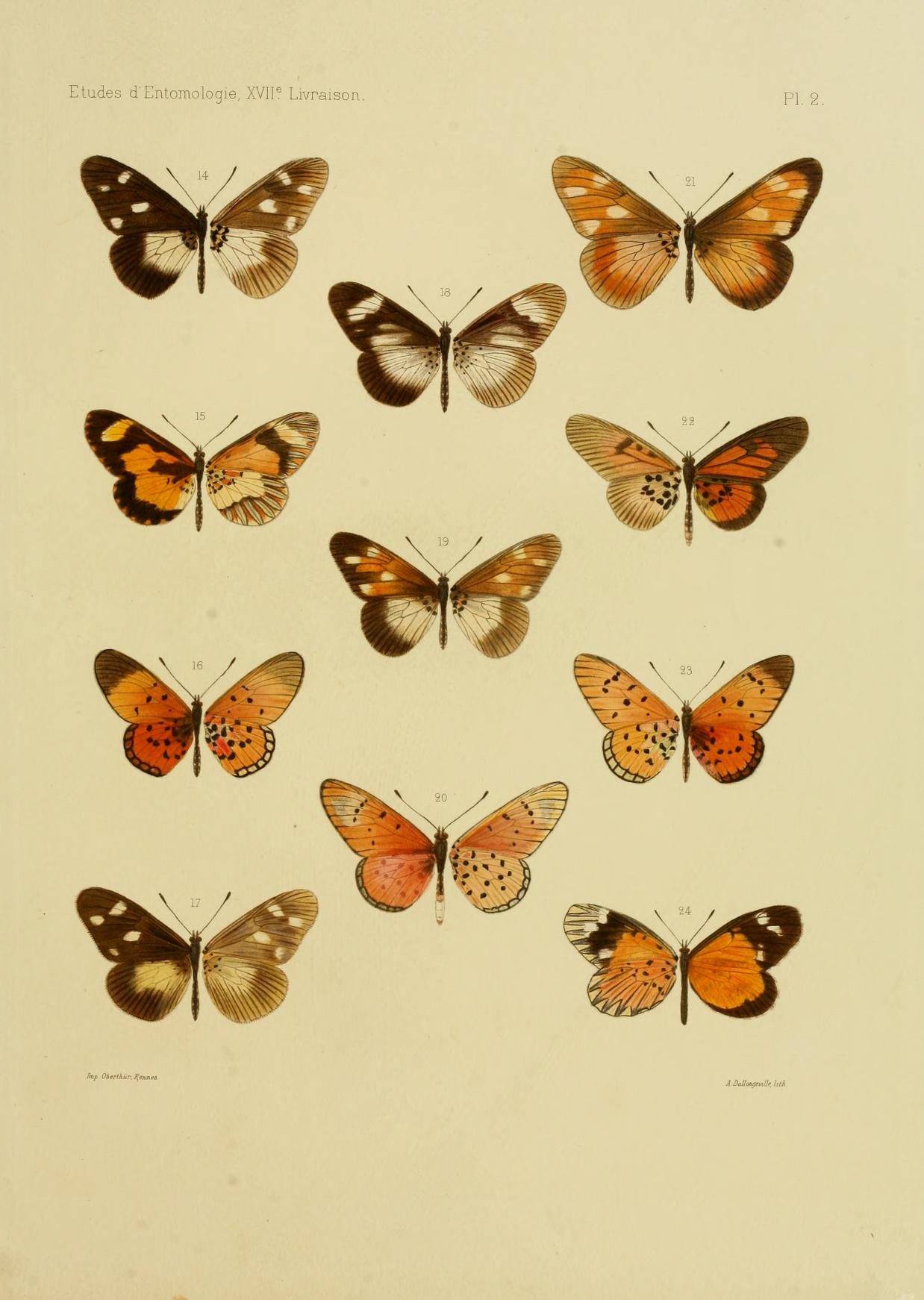
- Figure 24

Scientific classification
- Kingdom: Animalia
- Phylum: Arthropoda
- Class: Insecta
- Order: Lepidoptera
- Family: Lycaenidae
- Genus: Mimacraea
- Species: M. gelinia

Binomial name
- Mimacraea gelinia (Oberthür, 1893)

Synonyms
- Liptena gelinia Oberthür, 1893

= Mimacraea gelinia =

Species of butterfly

Mimacraea gelinia is a butterfly in the family Lycaenidae. It is found in Tanzania. The habitat consists of forests.

Adults of subspecies M. g. nguru resemble day-flying geometrid moths of the genus Scopula.

== Subspecies ==
- Mimacraea gelinia gelinia (Tanzania: north-east to Usambara)
- Mimacraea gelinia nguru Kielland, 1986 (Tanzania: Nguru mountains)
