= Cymothoe cottrelli =

Scientific classification
- Kingdom: Animalia
- Phylum: Arthropoda
- Class: Insecta
- Order: Lepidoptera
- Family: Nymphalidae
- Genus: Cymothoe
- Species: C. cottrelli

Binomial name
- Cymothoe cottrelli Rydon, 1980

Species of butterfly

Cymothoe cottrelli is a butterfly in the family Nymphalidae. It is found in Tanzania, Malawi and Zambia. The habitat consists of forests.

The larvae feed on Rawsonia lucida and Dovyalis species.

== Subspecies ==
- Cymothoe cottrelli cottrelli (south-western Tanzania, Malawi, Zambia: western Nyika Plateau)
- Cymothoe cottrelli njombe Rydon, 1996 (Tanzania)
- Cymothoe cottrelli livingstonensis Darge, 2006 (Tanzania: Livingstone Mountains)
