= Teriomima parva =

Scientific classification
- Kingdom: Animalia
- Phylum: Arthropoda
- Class: Insecta
- Order: Lepidoptera
- Family: Lycaenidae
- Genus: Teriomima
- Species: T. parva

Binomial name
- Teriomima parva Hawker-Smith, 1933

Synonyms
- Teriomima (Chrystina) parva

Species of butterfly

Teriomima parva, the poor buff, is a butterfly in the family Lycaenidae. It is found in Kenya, Tanzania and possibly Mozambique. The habitat consists of coastal and submontane forests.

The larvae probably feed on tree lichens.

== Subspecies ==
- Teriomima parva parva (coast of Kenya, Tanzania: coast and inland up to Amani, possibly the coast of Mozambique)
- Teriomima parva beylissi Henning & Henning, 2004 (Tanzania: Manga Forest Reserve)
