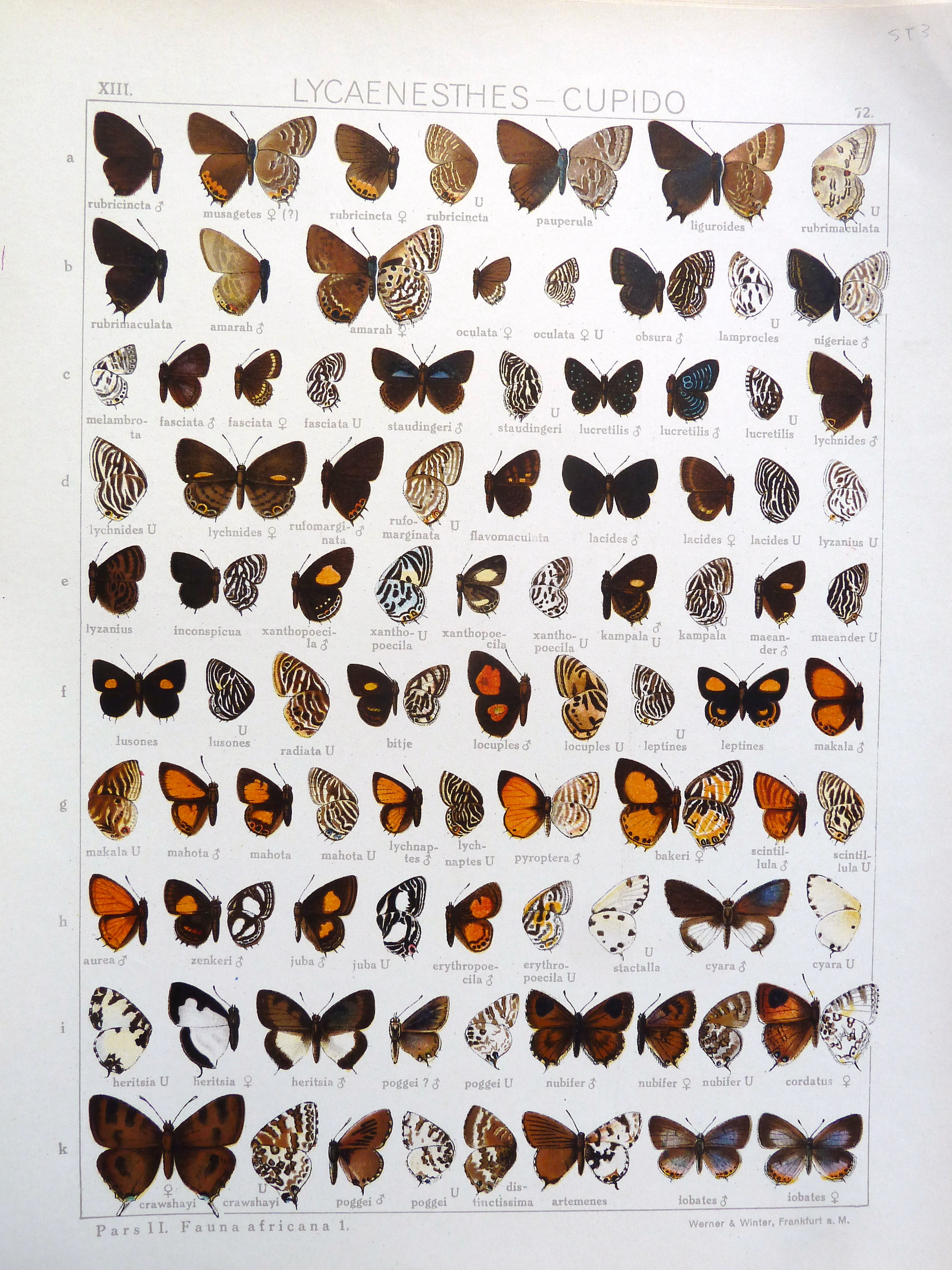
- a

Scientific classification
- Kingdom: Animalia
- Phylum: Arthropoda
- Class: Insecta
- Order: Lepidoptera
- Family: Lycaenidae
- Genus: Anthene
- Species: A. rubrimaculata

Binomial name
- Anthene rubrimaculata (Strand, 1909)

Synonyms
- Lycaenesthes rubrimaculata Strand, 1909; Anthene (Anthene) rubrimaculata

= Anthene rubrimaculata =

Species of butterfly

Anthene rubrimaculata is a butterfly in the family Lycaenidae. It is found in Tanzania.

The larvae feed on the flowers of Bridelia micrantha.

== Subspecies ==
- Anthene rubrimaculata rubrimaculata (north-eastern Tanzania)
- Anthene rubrimaculata tukuyu Kielland, 1990 (south-western Tanzania)
- Anthene rubrimaculata zanzibarica Congdon & Collins, 1998 (Tanzania: Zanzibar)
