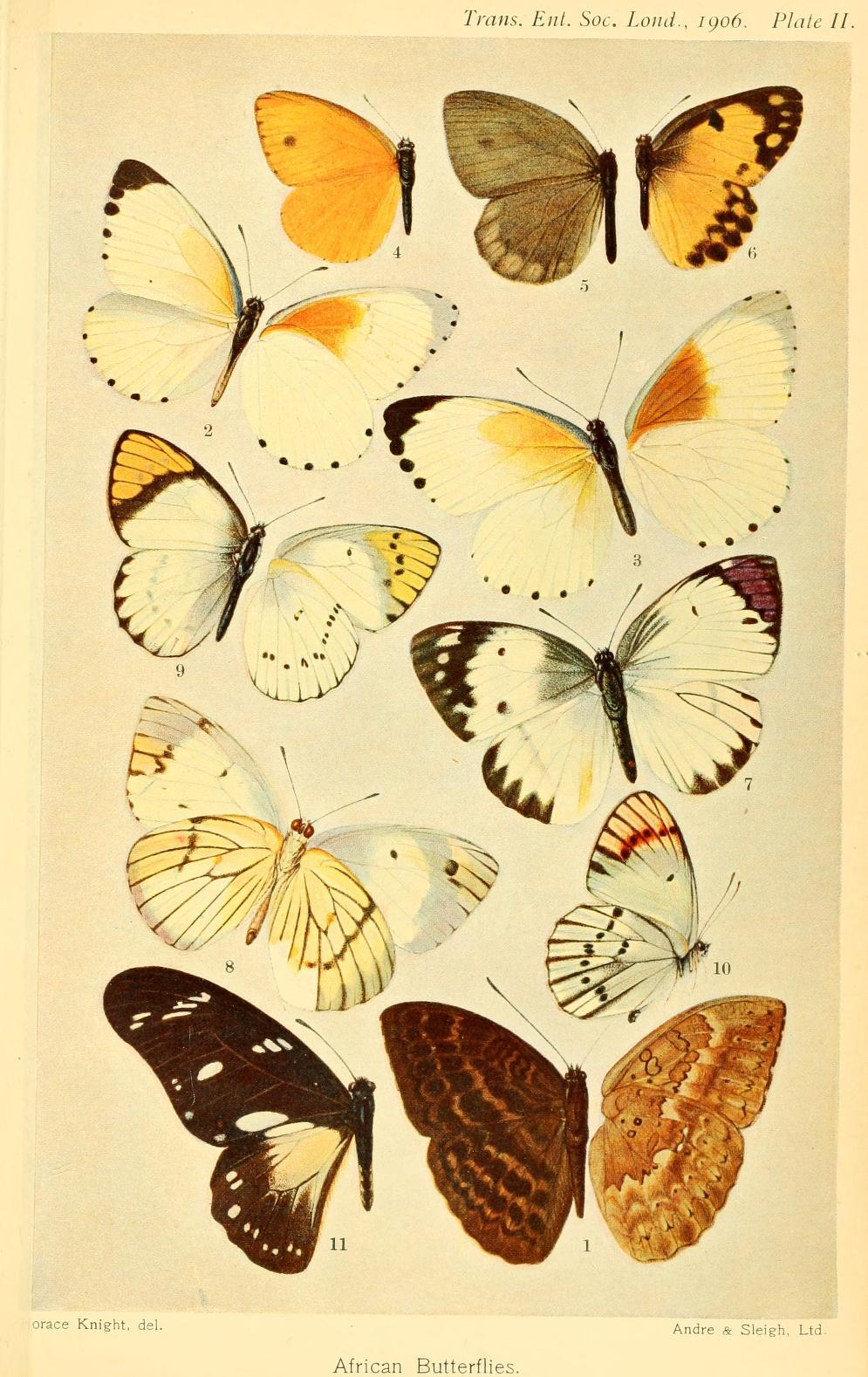
- Plate accompanying the original description.Mylothris similis figure 2 male, 3 female

Scientific classification
- Kingdom: Animalia
- Phylum: Arthropoda
- Clade: Pancrustacea
- Class: Insecta
- Order: Lepidoptera
- Family: Pieridae
- Genus: Mylothris
- Species: M. similis

Binomial name
- Mylothris similis Lathy, 1906

Synonyms
- Mylothris dollmani Riley, 1921; Mylothris dollmani f. flavida Riley, 1921

= Mylothris similis =

Species of butterfly

Mylothris similis is a butterfly in the family Pieridae. It is found in Tanzania, Malawi, Zambia, the Democratic Republic of the Congo, Uganda and Rwanda. The habitat consists of submontane and montane forests.

Adults are mainly found in forest clearings, but may also be found in gardens. They are attracted to flowers.

The larvae feed on Santalales species.

== Subspecies ==
- Mylothris similis similis (Tanzania, Malawi)
- Mylothris similis dollmani Riley, 1921 (Tanzania, Zambia, Democratic Republic of the Congo)
- Mylothris similis noel Talbot, 1944 (Uganda, Democratic Republic of the Congo: Kivu)
