= Hypolycaena auricostalis =

- H. auricostalis and H. auricostalis frommiin Seitz

Scientific classification
- Kingdom: Animalia
- Phylum: Arthropoda
- Clade: Pancrustacea
- Class: Insecta
- Order: Lepidoptera
- Family: Lycaenidae
- Genus: Hypolycaena
- Species: H. auricostalis

Binomial name
- Hypolycaena auricostalis (Butler, 1897)

Synonyms
- Iolaus auricostalis Butler, 1897; Hypolycaena sebasta Hulstaert, 1924

Species of butterfly

Hypolycaena auricostalis is a butterfly in the family Lycaenidae. It is found in the Democratic Republic of the Congo, Tanzania, Zambia and Malawi.

== Subspecies ==
- Hypolycaena auricostalis auricostalis (Tanzania, Zambia, Malawi, Democratic Republic of the Congo: Lualaba and Shaba)
- Hypolycaena auricostalis frommi Strand, 1911 (Tanzania)
