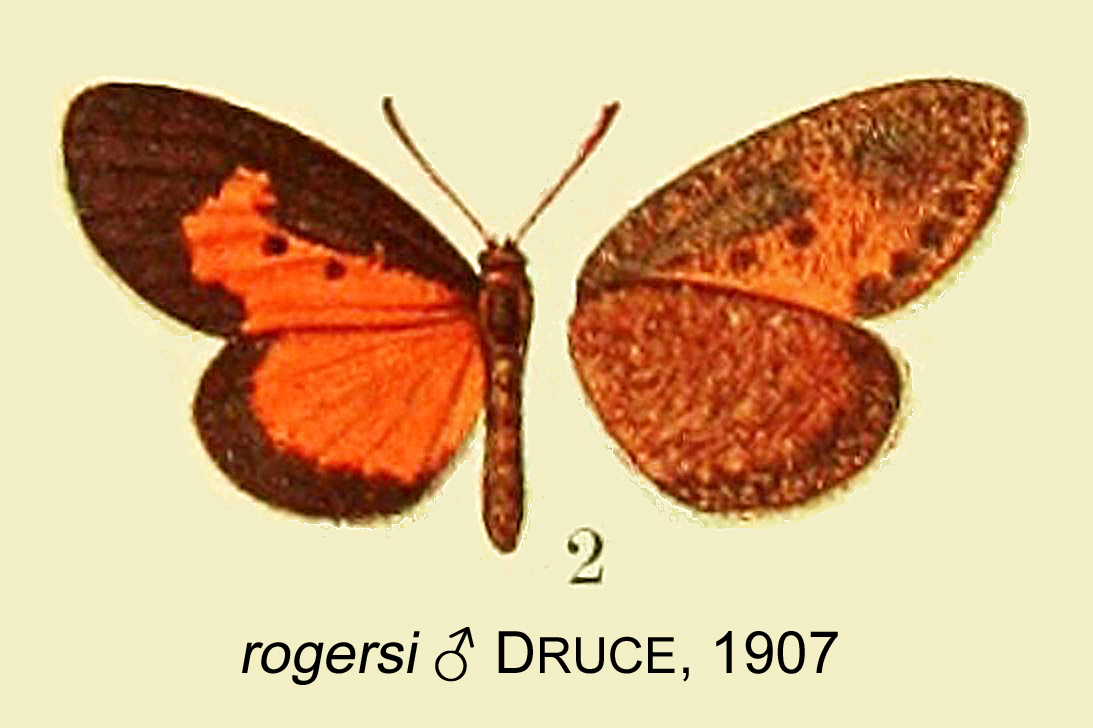

Scientific classification
- Domain: Eukaryota
- Kingdom: Animalia
- Phylum: Arthropoda
- Class: Insecta
- Order: Lepidoptera
- Family: Lycaenidae
- Genus: Pentila
- Species: P. rogersi

Binomial name
- Pentila rogersi (H. H. Druce, 1907)

Synonyms
- Telipna rogersi H. H. Druce, 1907; Pentila parapetreia Rebel, 1908; Pentila parapetreia var. derema Strand, 1911

= Pentila rogersi =

Species of butterfly

Pentila rogersi, or Rogers' pentila, is a butterfly in the family Lycaenidae. The species was first described by Hamilton Herbert Druce in 1907. It is found in Kenya and Tanzania. The habitat consists of coastal forests and lowland forests at altitudes ranging from sea level to 900 metres.

== Subspecies ==
- Pentila rogersi rogersi (coast of Kenya, coast of Tanzania)
- Pentila rogersi parapetreia Rebel, 1908 (Tanzania: north-east to the Uluguru and Usambara mountains)
