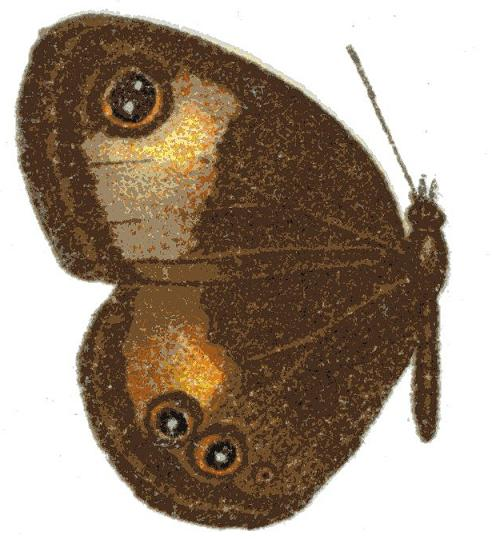

Scientific classification
- Kingdom: Animalia
- Phylum: Arthropoda
- Class: Insecta
- Order: Lepidoptera
- Family: Nymphalidae
- Genus: Neocoenyra
- Species: N. jordani

Binomial name
- Neocoenyra jordani Rebel, 1906

= Neocoenyra jordani =

Species of butterfly

Neocoenyra jordani is a butterfly in the family Nymphalidae. It is found in Tanzania.

== Subspecies ==
- Neocoenyra jordani jordani (eastern Tanzania)
- Neocoenyra jordani septentrionalis Kielland, 1990 (eastern Tanzania)
