= Neita orbipalus =

Scientific classification
- Kingdom: Animalia
- Phylum: Arthropoda
- Class: Insecta
- Order: Lepidoptera
- Family: Nymphalidae
- Genus: Neita
- Species: N. orbipalus

Binomial name
- Neita orbipalus Kielland, 1990

Species of butterfly

Neita orbipalus is a butterfly in the family Nymphalidae. It is found in Tanzania.

== Subspecies ==
- Neita orbipalus orbipalus (Tanzania: north to the Arusha plain)
- Neita orbipalus congdoni Kielland, 1990 (Tanzania: southern highlands)
