= Bicyclus simulacris =

Scientific classification
- Kingdom: Animalia
- Phylum: Arthropoda
- Clade: Pancrustacea
- Class: Insecta
- Order: Lepidoptera
- Family: Nymphalidae
- Genus: Bicyclus
- Species: B. simulacris

Binomial name
- Bicyclus simulacris Kielland, 1990

Species of butterfly

Bicyclus simulacris is a butterfly in the family Nymphalidae. It is found in Tanzania, Malawi and Zambia. The habitat consists of montane forests.

== Subspecies ==
- Bicyclus simulacris simulacris (eastern and southern Tanzania, Malawi, Zambia)
- Bicyclus simulacris septentrionalis Kielland, 1990 (north-eastern Tanzania)
