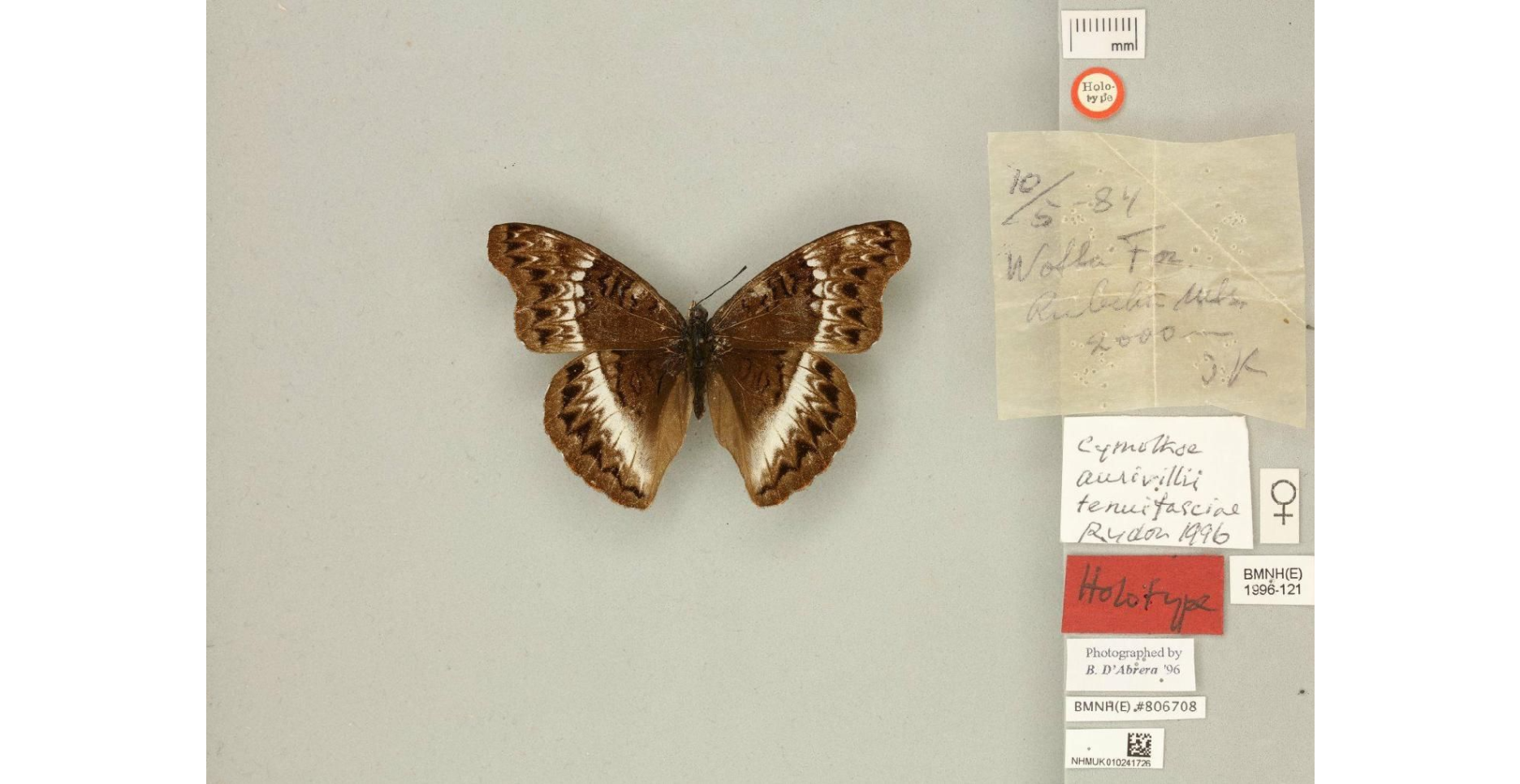

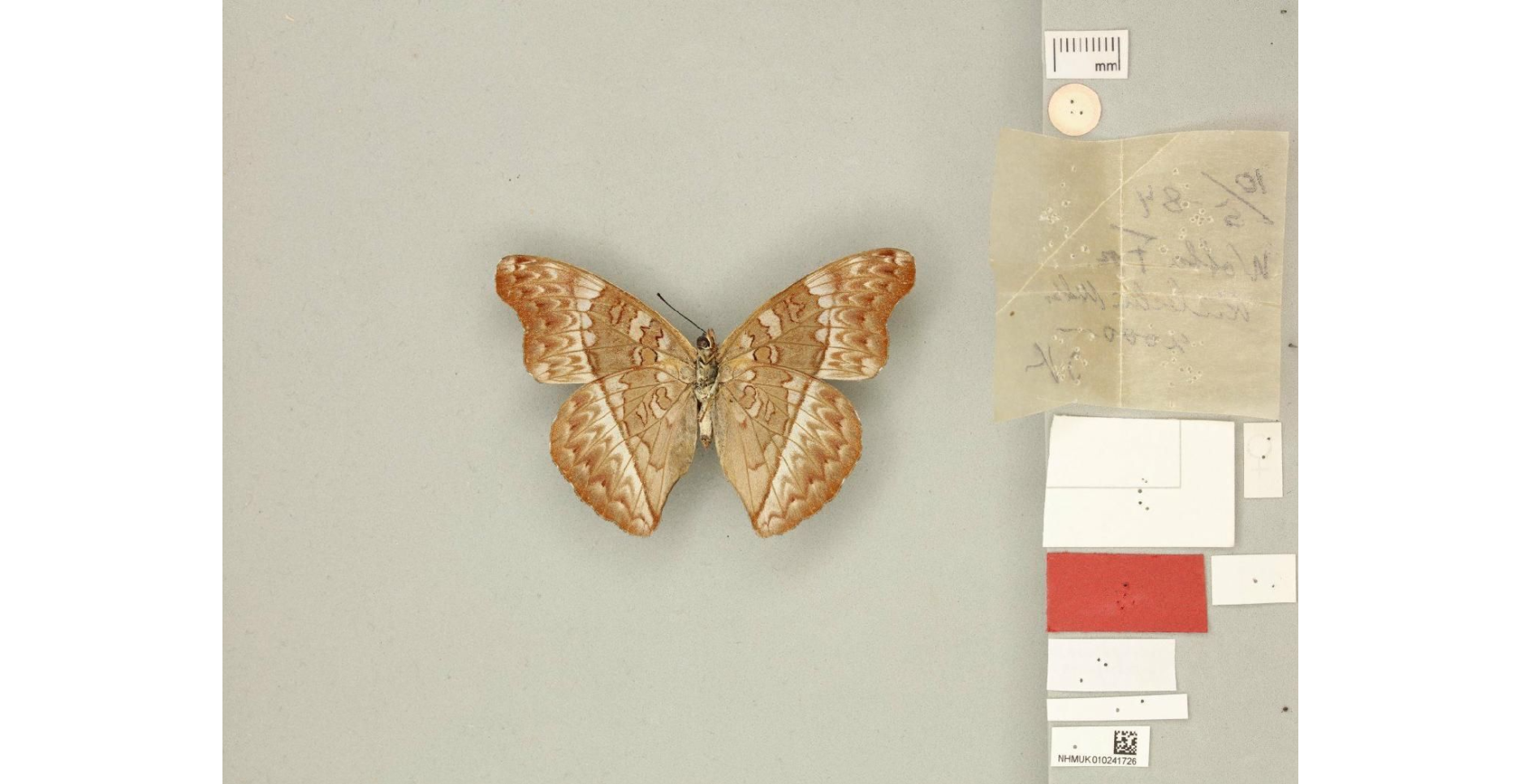

Scientific classification
- Kingdom: Animalia
- Phylum: Arthropoda
- Class: Insecta
- Order: Lepidoptera
- Family: Nymphalidae
- Genus: Cymothoe
- Species: C. aurivillii

Binomial name
- Cymothoe aurivillii Staudinger, 1899

= Cymothoe aurivillii =

Species of butterfly

Cymothoe aurivillii is a butterfly in the family Nymphalidae. It is found in Tanzania.The habitat consists of sub-montane and montane forests.

The larvae feed on Rawsonia usambarensis.

== Subspecies ==
- Cymothoe aurivillii aurivillii (Tanzania: Uluguru Mountains)
- Cymothoe aurivillii handeni Rydon, 1996 (Tanzania: Nguu Mountains)
- Cymothoe aurivillii latifasciata Rydon, 1996 (Tanzania: Udzungwa Mountains)
- Cymothoe aurivillii nguru Rydon, 1996 (Tanzania: Nguru Mountains)
- Cymothoe aurivillii tenuifasciae Rydon, 1996 (Tanzania: Rubeho Mountains)
