= Chondrolepis uluguru =

Scientific classification
- Kingdom: Animalia
- Phylum: Arthropoda
- Class: Insecta
- Order: Lepidoptera
- Family: Hesperiidae
- Genus: Chondrolepis
- Species: C. uluguru

Binomial name
- Chondrolepis uluguru T.B. Larsen & Congdon, 2012

Species of butterfly

Chondrolepis uluguru is a species of butterfly in the family Hesperiidae. It is found in the Uluguru Mountains of Tanzania. The habitat consists of submontane areas.
