= Baliochila latimarginata =

Scientific classification
- Kingdom: Animalia
- Phylum: Arthropoda
- Class: Insecta
- Order: Lepidoptera
- Family: Lycaenidae
- Genus: Baliochila
- Species: B. latimarginata

Binomial name
- Baliochila latimarginata (Hawker-Smith, 1933)

Synonyms
- Teriomima minima latimarginata Hawker-Smith, 1933

Species of butterfly

Baliochila latimarginata is a butterfly in the family Lycaenidae. It is found in Kenya and Tanzania. Its habitat consists of lowland forests ranging from near sea level to 800 metres in altitude.

== Subspecies ==
- Baliochila latimarginata latimarginata (coast of Kenya, Tanzania: from the north coast inland to Amani)
- Baliochila latimarginata rondoensis Henning & Henning, 2004 (south-eastern Tanzania)
