= Alaena interposita =

Scientific classification
- Kingdom: Animalia
- Phylum: Arthropoda
- Class: Insecta
- Order: Lepidoptera
- Family: Lycaenidae
- Genus: Alaena
- Species: A. interposita

Binomial name
- Alaena interposita Butler, 1883

Synonyms
- Alaena hauttecoeuri Oberthür, 1888

Species of insect

Alaena interposita is a butterfly in the family Lycaenidae. It is found in Tanzania. The habitat consists of Brachystegia woodland.

== Subspecies ==
- Alaena interposita interposita (Tanzania)
- Alaena interposita hauttecoeuri Oberthür, 1888 (Tanzania: south-west to the Tabora Region)
