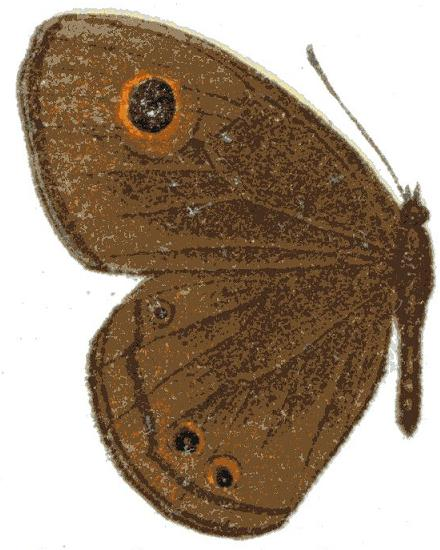

Scientific classification
- Kingdom: Animalia
- Phylum: Arthropoda
- Class: Insecta
- Order: Lepidoptera
- Family: Nymphalidae
- Genus: Neocoenyra
- Species: N. heckmanni

Binomial name
- Neocoenyra heckmanni Thurau, 1903

Synonyms
- Neocoenyra heckmanni ab. wentzelae Thurau, 1903; Neocoenyra mittoni Pinhey, 1956; Neocoenyra heckmanni songeana Kielland, 1990

= Neocoenyra heckmanni =

Species of butterfly

Neocoenyra heckmanni is a butterfly in the family Nymphalidae. It is found in Tanzania.

== Subspecies ==
- Neocoenyra heckmanni heckmanni (southern Tanzania)
- Neocoenyra heckmanni kennethi Kielland, 1990 (eastern Tanzania)
- Neocoenyra heckmanni mangalisa Kielland, 1990 (central Tanzania)
- Neocoenyra heckmanni mbinga Kielland, 1990 (southern Tanzania)
- Neocoenyra heckmanni uzungwae Kielland, 1990 (south-central Tanzania)
