= Bicyclus moyses =

Scientific classification
- Kingdom: Animalia
- Phylum: Arthropoda
- Clade: Pancrustacea
- Class: Insecta
- Order: Lepidoptera
- Family: Nymphalidae
- Genus: Bicyclus
- Species: B. moyses

Binomial name
- Bicyclus moyses Condamin & Fox, 1964

Species of butterfly

Bicyclus moyses is a butterfly in the family Nymphalidae. It is found in various parts of Africa, most commonly in Cameroon.

== Description ==
The morphology of Bicyclus moyses is similar to that of Bicyclus dorothea and Bicyclus jefferyi. The dorsal area of Bicyclus moyses is evenly brown with a distinct violet patina. The underside of its wings is browner with a clear banding pattern.

== Distribution ==
Bicyclus moyses is most commonly found in southern Cameroon but has also been spotted in neighbouring African countries including Gabon, Angola, and the Democratic Republic of the Congo, with a fraction of the population spilling over to the Central African Republic.
