= Red Ring =

Red Ring may refer to:

- A ring with a red gemstone

== Biology ==
- Red ring disease, caused by the nematode Bursaphelenchus cocophilus
- Bicyclus anisops, red ring bush brown, a butterfly
- Hestina assimilis, red ring skirt, a butterfly
- Phellinus pini, red ring rot, a fungus

== Literature and comics ==
- Narya, the Red Ring, one of the Rings in J. R. R. Tolkien's Middle-earth universe
- Red power ring of the Red Lantern Corps in the DC universe

== Motorsport ==
- Red Ring (Russian: Красное Кольцо) is a russian motorsport venue in Krasnoyarsk krai

== Video games ==
- A special type of collectible ring in a number of Sonic the Hedgehog games
- A red ring that appears in some Mario games
- Red Ring of Death, a common Xbox 360 problem

== See also ==
- Ring of Red, 2000 video game
- Red Ring Rico, Phantasy Star Online character
