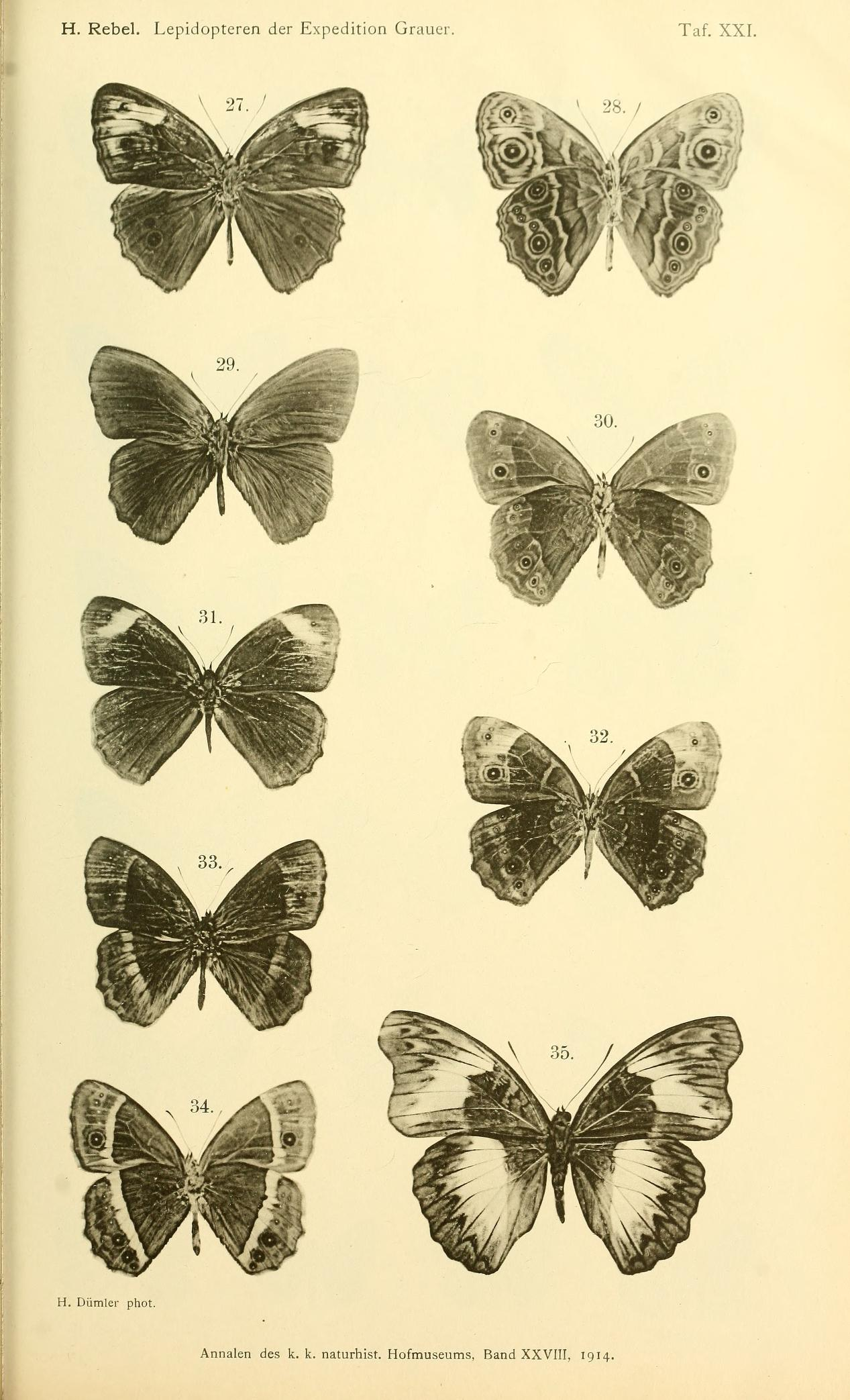
- Figures 33 and 34

Scientific classification
- Kingdom: Animalia
- Phylum: Arthropoda
- Clade: Pancrustacea
- Class: Insecta
- Order: Lepidoptera
- Family: Nymphalidae
- Genus: Bicyclus
- Species: B. albocincta

Binomial name
- Bicyclus albocincta (Rebel, 1914)

Synonyms
- Mycalesis albocincta Rebel, 1914

= Bicyclus albocincta =

Species of butterfly

Bicyclus albocincta is a butterfly in the family Nymphalidae. It is found in the Democratic Republic of the Congo.
