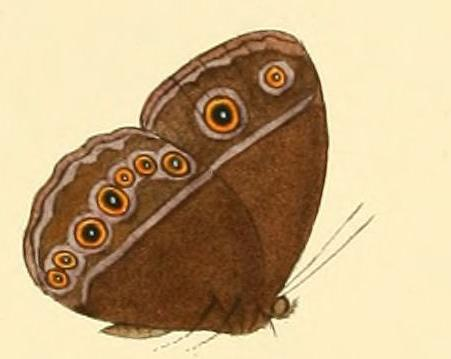

Scientific classification
- Kingdom: Animalia
- Phylum: Arthropoda
- Clade: Pancrustacea
- Class: Insecta
- Order: Lepidoptera
- Family: Nymphalidae
- Genus: Bicyclus
- Species: B. rhacotis

Binomial name
- Bicyclus rhacotis (Hewitson, 1866)

Synonyms
- Mycalesis rhacotis Hewitson, 1866

= Bicyclus rhacotis =

Rhacotis bush brown

Species of butterfly

Bicyclus rhacotis, the Rhacotis bush brown, is a butterfly in the family Nymphalidae. It is found in Nigeria, Cameroon, Gabon, the Republic of the Congo, the Democratic Republic of the Congo, Uganda and north-western Tanzania. The habitat consists of deep forests.
