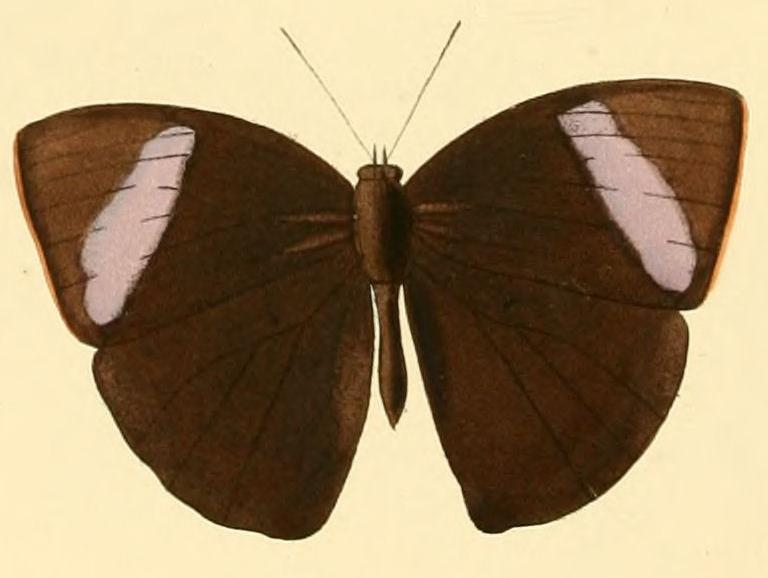

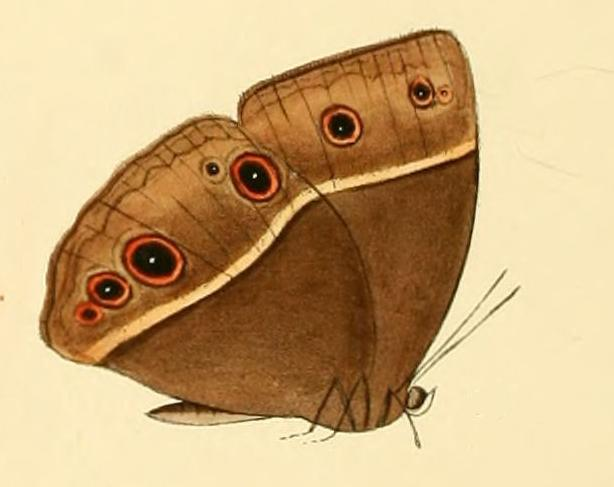

Scientific classification
- Kingdom: Animalia
- Phylum: Arthropoda
- Clade: Pancrustacea
- Class: Insecta
- Order: Lepidoptera
- Family: Nymphalidae
- Genus: Bicyclus
- Species: B. medontias

Binomial name
- Bicyclus medontias (Hewitson, 1873)

Synonyms
- Mycalesis medontias Hewitson, 1873; Idiomorphus vala Plötz, 1880; Mycalesis medontias f. micropthalma Rebel, 1914; Bicyclus medontias var. obsoletus Holland, 1920

= Bicyclus medontias =

White-line bush brown

Species of butterfly

Bicyclus medontias, the white-line bush brown, is a butterfly in the family Nymphalidae. It is found in Nigeria, Cameroon, Bioko, São Tomé and Príncipe, Gabon, the Republic of the Congo, the Central African Republic and the Democratic Republic of the Congo. The habitat consists of forests, including somewhat degraded forests.
