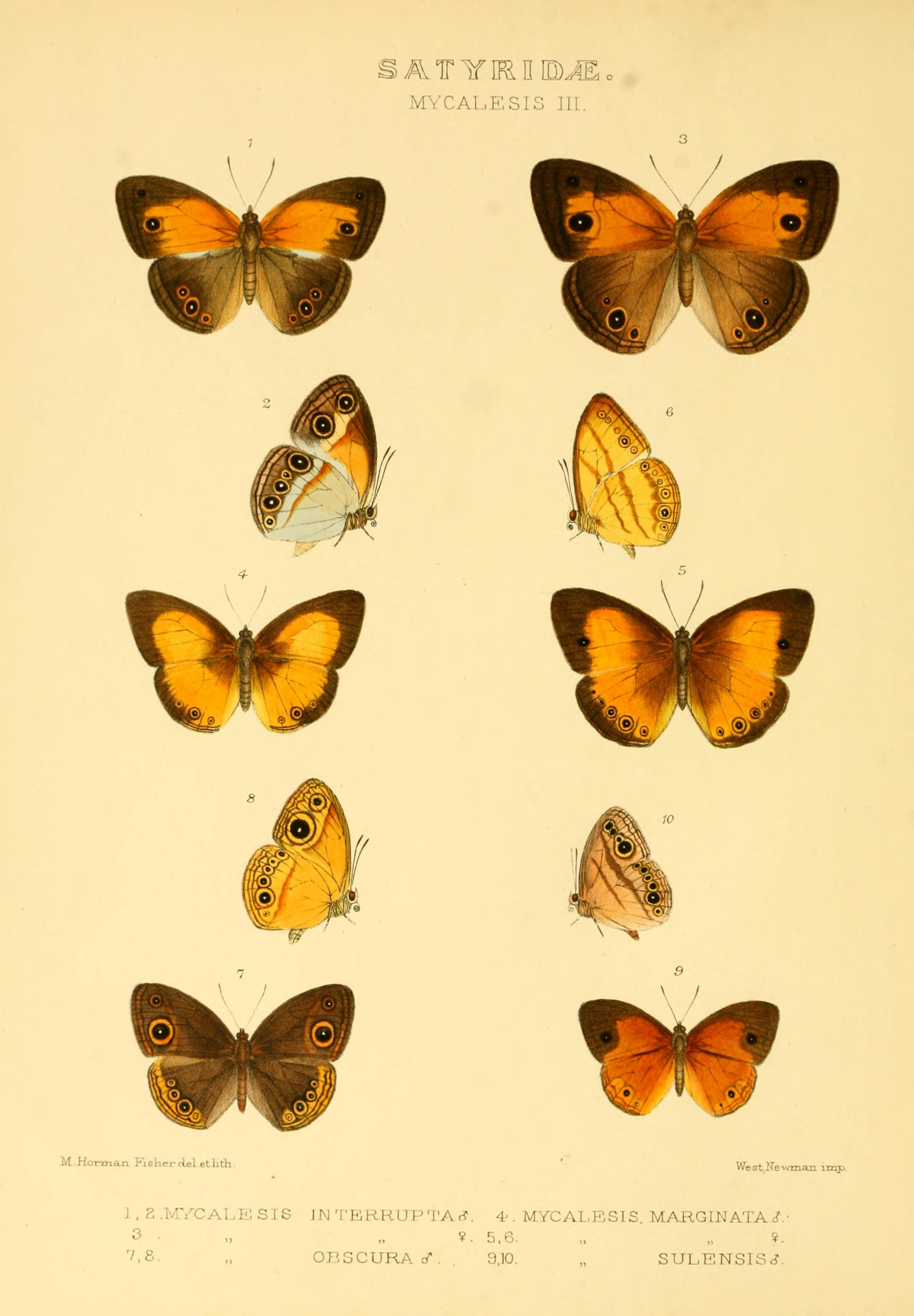
- Figures 7 and 8

Scientific classification
- Kingdom: Animalia
- Phylum: Arthropoda
- Clade: Pancrustacea
- Class: Insecta
- Order: Lepidoptera
- Family: Nymphalidae
- Genus: Bicyclus
- Species: B. smithi

Binomial name
- Bicyclus smithi (Aurivillius, 1899)

Synonyms
- Mycalesis smithi Aurivillius, 1899; Mycalesis ansorgei Grose-Smith, 1898; Mycalesis nandina Ansorge, 1899; Mycalesis obscura Aurivillius, 1901; Mycalesis campides Strand, 1912; Mycalesis fernandina Schultze, 1914; Bicyclus smithi poensis Condamin, 1963

= Bicyclus smithi =

Smith's bush brown

Species of butterfly

Bicyclus smithi, or Smith's bush brown, is a butterfly in the family Nymphalidae. It is found in Nigeria, Cameroon, Equatorial Guinea, Angola, the Democratic Republic of the Congo, Uganda, Kenya and Tanzania. The habitat consists of lowland forests.

Adults are attracted to fermenting bananas.

== Subspecies ==
- Bicyclus smithi smithi (Nigeria, Cameroon, Angola, Democratic Republic of the Congo, Uganda, western Kenya, western Tanzania)
- Bicyclus smithi eurypterus Condamin, 1965 (Democratic Republic of the Congo)
- Bicyclus smithi fernandina (Schultze, 1914) (Bioko)
