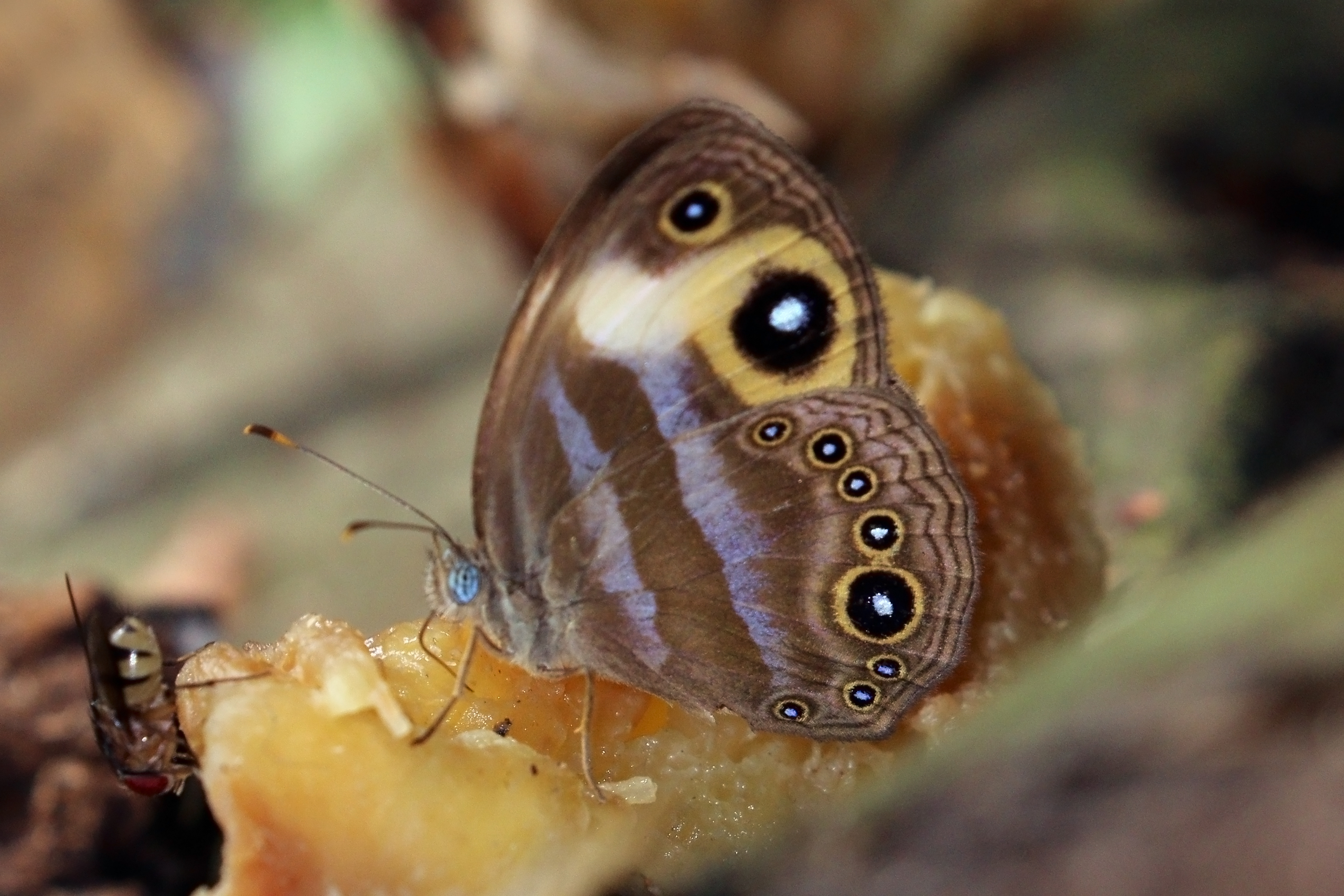
- Male B. larseni in Ghana

Scientific classification
- Kingdom: Animalia
- Phylum: Arthropoda
- Clade: Pancrustacea
- Class: Insecta
- Order: Lepidoptera
- Family: Nymphalidae
- Subfamily: Satyrinae
- Tribe: Satyrini
- Genus: Bicyclus; Kirby, 1871

Type species
- Idiomorphus hewitsonii Doumet, 1861

Diversity
- 84 species

Synonyms
- Idiomorphus Doumet, 1861; Monotrichtis Hampson, 1891; Dicothyris Karsch, 1893

= Bicyclus =

Genus of butterflies

Bicyclus is a butterfly genus from the subfamily Satyrinae in the family Nymphalidae. The species are found in the Afrotropical realm.

== Species ==
- Bicyclus abnormis (Dudgeon, 1909)
- Bicyclus albocincta (Rebel, 1914)
- Bicyclus alboplaga (Rebel, 1914)
- Bicyclus amieti Libert, 1996
- Bicyclus analis (Aurivillius, 1895)
- Bicyclus angulosa (Butler, 1868)
- Bicyclus anisops (Karsch, 1892)
- Bicyclus anynana (Butler, 1879)
- Bicyclus auricruda (Butler, 1868)
- Bicyclus aurivillii (Butler, [1896])
- Bicyclus brakefieldi Brattstrom, 2012
- Bicyclus buea (Strand, 1912)
- Bicyclus campina (Aurivillius, 1901)
- Bicyclus campus (Karsch, 1893)
- Bicyclus condamini van Son, 1963
- Bicyclus cooksoni (Druce, 1905)
- Bicyclus cottrelli (van Son, 1952)
- Bicyclus danckelmani (Rogenhofer, 1891)
- Bicyclus dekeyseri (Condamin, 1958)
- Bicyclus dentata (Sharpe, 1898)
- Bicyclus dorothea (Cramer, [1779])
- Bicyclus dubia (Aurivillius, 1893)
- Bicyclus elishiae Brattstrom, 2015
- Bicyclus ena (Hewitson, 1877)
- Bicyclus ephorus Weymer, 1892
- Bicyclus evadne (Cramer, [1779])
- Bicyclus feae (Aurivillius, 1910)
- Bicyclus funebris (Guérin-Méneville, 1844)
- Bicyclus golo (Aurivillius, 1893)
- Bicyclus graueri (Rebel, 1914)
- Bicyclus heathi Brattstrom, 2015
- Bicyclus hewitsonii (Doumet, 1861)
- Bicyclus howarthi Condamin, 1963
- Bicyclus hyperanthus (Bethune-Baker, 1908)
- Bicyclus iccius (Hewitson, [1865])
- Bicyclus ignobilis (Butler, 1870)
- Bicyclus istaris (Plötz, 1880)
- Bicyclus italus (Hewitson, 1865)
- Bicyclus jefferyi Fox, 1963
- Bicyclus kenia (Rogenhofer, 1891)
- Bicyclus kiellandi Condamin, 1986
- Bicyclus lamani (Aurivillius, 1900)
- Bicyclus larseni van de Weghe, 2009
- Bicyclus makomensis (Strand, 1913)
- Bicyclus madetes (Hewitson, 1874)
- Bicyclus maesseni Condamin, 1970
- Bicyclus mahale Congdon, Kielland & Collins, 1998
- Bicyclus mandanes (Hewitson, 1873)
- Bicyclus martius (Fabricius, 1793)
- Bicyclus matuta (Karsch, 1894)
- Bicyclus medontias (Hewitson, [1872])
- Bicyclus mesogena (Karsch, 1894)
- Bicyclus milyas (Hewitson, 1864)
- Bicyclus mollitia (Karsch, 1895)
- Bicyclus moyses Condamin & Fox, 1964
- Bicyclus nachtetis Condamin, 1965
- Bicyclus neustetteri (Rebel, 1914)
- Bicyclus nobilis (Aurivillius, 1893)
- Bicyclus pareensis Collins & Kielland, 2008
- Bicyclus pavonis (Butler, 1876)
- Bicyclus persimilis (Joicey & Talbot, 1921)
- Bicyclus procora (Karsch, 1893)
- Bicyclus rhacotis (Hewitson, [1866])
- Bicyclus rileyi Condamin, 1961
- Bicyclus safitza (Westwood, [1850])
- Bicyclus sambulos (Hewitson, [1877])
- Bicyclus sandace (Hewitson, 1877)
- Bicyclus sangmelinae Condamin, 1963
- Bicyclus saussurei (Dewitz, 1879)
- Bicyclus sciathis (Hewitson, [1866])
- Bicyclus sealeae Collins & Larsen, 2008
- Bicyclus sebetus (Hewitson, 1877)
- Bicyclus sigiussidorum Brattstrom, 2015
- Bicyclus similis Condamin, 1963
- Bicyclus simulacris Kielland, 1990
- Bicyclus smithi (Aurivillius, 1928)
- Bicyclus sophrosyne (Plötz, 1880)
- Bicyclus subtilisurae Brattstrom, 2015
- Bicyclus suffusa (Riley, 1921)
- Bicyclus sweadneri Fox, 1963
- Bicyclus sylvicolus Condamin, 1961
- Bicyclus taenias (Hewitson, 1877)
- Bicyclus tanzanicus Condamin, 1986
- Bicyclus technatis (Hewitson, 1877)
- Bicyclus trilophus (Rebel, 1914)
- Bicyclus uniformis (Bethune-Baker, 1908)
- Bicyclus uzungwensis Kielland, 1990
- Bicyclus vansoni Condamin, 1965
- Bicyclus vulgaris (Butler, 1868)
- Bicyclus xeneas (Hewitson, [1866])
- Bicyclus xeneoides Condamin, 1961
- Bicyclus zinebi (Butler, 1869)

Torben Larsen developed a species numbering system for his 2005 publication Butterflies of West Africa. The species B. larseni is #684. The 'Larsen' numbers have since been used with permission in A Sharp Eye on Butterflies of Ghana.
