= Bicyclus suffusa =

Scientific classification
- Kingdom: Animalia
- Phylum: Arthropoda
- Clade: Pancrustacea
- Class: Insecta
- Order: Lepidoptera
- Family: Nymphalidae
- Genus: Bicyclus
- Species: B. suffusa

Binomial name
- Bicyclus suffusa (Riley, 1921)

Synonyms
- Mycalesis saussurei suffusa Riley, 1921

Species of butterfly

Bicyclus suffusa is a butterfly in the family Nymphalidae. It is found in Angola, the Democratic Republic of the Congo and Zambia.

== Subspecies ==
- Bicyclus suffusa suffusa (Angola, Democratic Republic of the Congo: Lomami, Lualaba, north-western Zambia)
- Bicyclus suffusa ituriensis Condamin, 1970 (Democratic Republic of the Congo: north-east to Ituri)
