= Bicyclus heathi =

Scientific classification
- Kingdom: Animalia
- Phylum: Arthropoda
- Clade: Pancrustacea
- Class: Insecta
- Order: Lepidoptera
- Family: Nymphalidae
- Genus: Bicyclus
- Species: B. heathi

Binomial name
- Bicyclus heathi Brattström et al., 2015

Species of butterfly

Bicyclus heathi is a butterfly in the family Nymphalidae. It is found in the northeastern part of the Democratic Republic of Congo.

The wingspan is 27 mm. The wings are dark reddish brown without eyespots, except a small amount of lighter scales placed. Females are larger and the wing colour is paler, with fewer reddish tones, than the males.

== Etymology ==
The species is named in honour of Alan Heath, who collected the holotype and one paratype during a visit to the Irangi forest region in 1978.
