= Bicyclus analis =

Anal-patch bush brown

Scientific classification
- Kingdom: Animalia
- Phylum: Arthropoda
- Clade: Pancrustacea
- Class: Insecta
- Order: Lepidoptera
- Family: Nymphalidae
- Genus: Bicyclus
- Species: B. analis

Binomial name
- Bicyclus analis (Aurivillius, 1895)

Synonyms
- Mycalesis analis Aurivillius, 1895

Species of butterfly

Bicyclus analis, the anal-patch bush brown, is a butterfly in the family Nymphalidae. It is found in eastern Nigeria, Cameroon, the Democratic Republic of the Congo and western Uganda.

== Description ==
B. analis has a yellowish grey under surface with almost smooth or slightly undulate transverse lines; the hindwing beneath with distinct eye-spots in cellule 3 and the forewing also above with two light-pupilled eye-spots in cellules 2 and 5. male: wings above dark brown, the hindwing at the anal angle with a black velvety spot with grey reflection, divided by vein I b and in the basal part of cellule 1 c long-haired, beneath with 7 distinct eye-spots with yellow, brown and whitish rings, two in cellule 1 c and one each in cellules 2 — 6, the spot in cellule 2 somewhat larger than the others; the eye-spots are placed in an almost uniformly curved row. The female without white transverse band on the forewing. Cameroons and Congo district.
