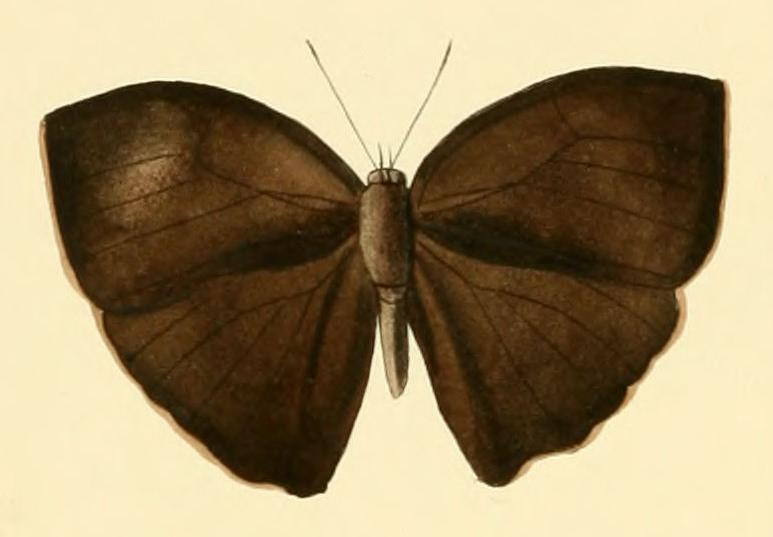

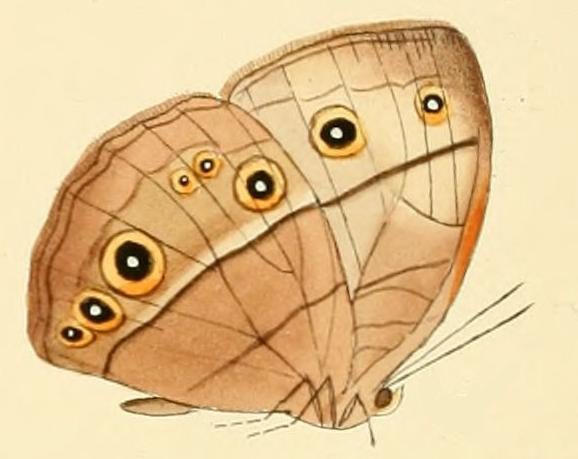

Scientific classification
- Kingdom: Animalia
- Phylum: Arthropoda
- Clade: Pancrustacea
- Class: Insecta
- Order: Lepidoptera
- Family: Nymphalidae
- Genus: Bicyclus
- Species: B. italus

Binomial name
- Bicyclus italus (Hewitson, 1865)

Synonyms
- Idiomorphus italus Hewitson, 1865; Idiomorphus massalia Plötz, 1880

= Bicyclus italus =

Large bush brown

Species of butterfly

Bicyclus italus, the large bush brown, is a butterfly in the family Nymphalidae. It is found in Ghana, Togo, Nigeria, Cameroon, Bioko, Gabon, the Republic of the Congo, the Central African Republic and the Democratic Republic of the Congo. The habitat consists of forests, including drier forests.

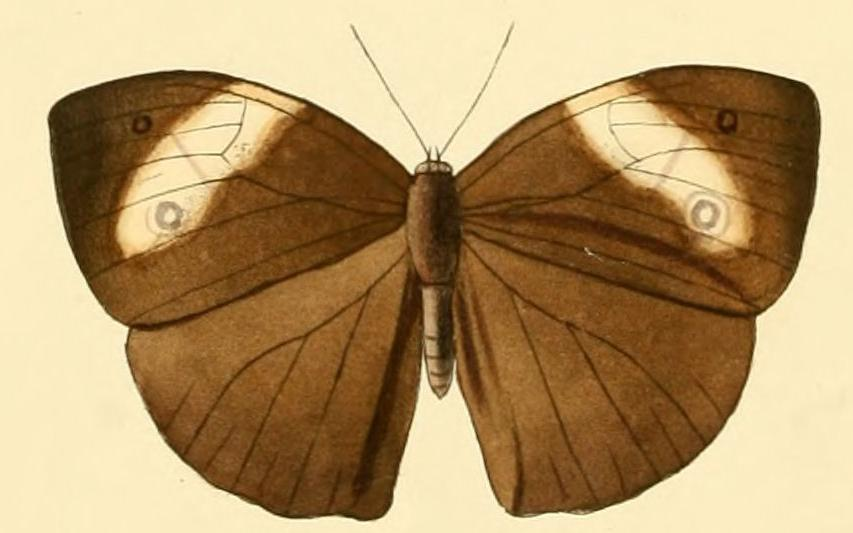

Torben Larsen developed a species numbering system for his 2005 publication Butterflies of West Africa. This species is #672. The 'Larsen' numbers have since been used with permission in A Sharp Eye on Butterflies of Ghana.
