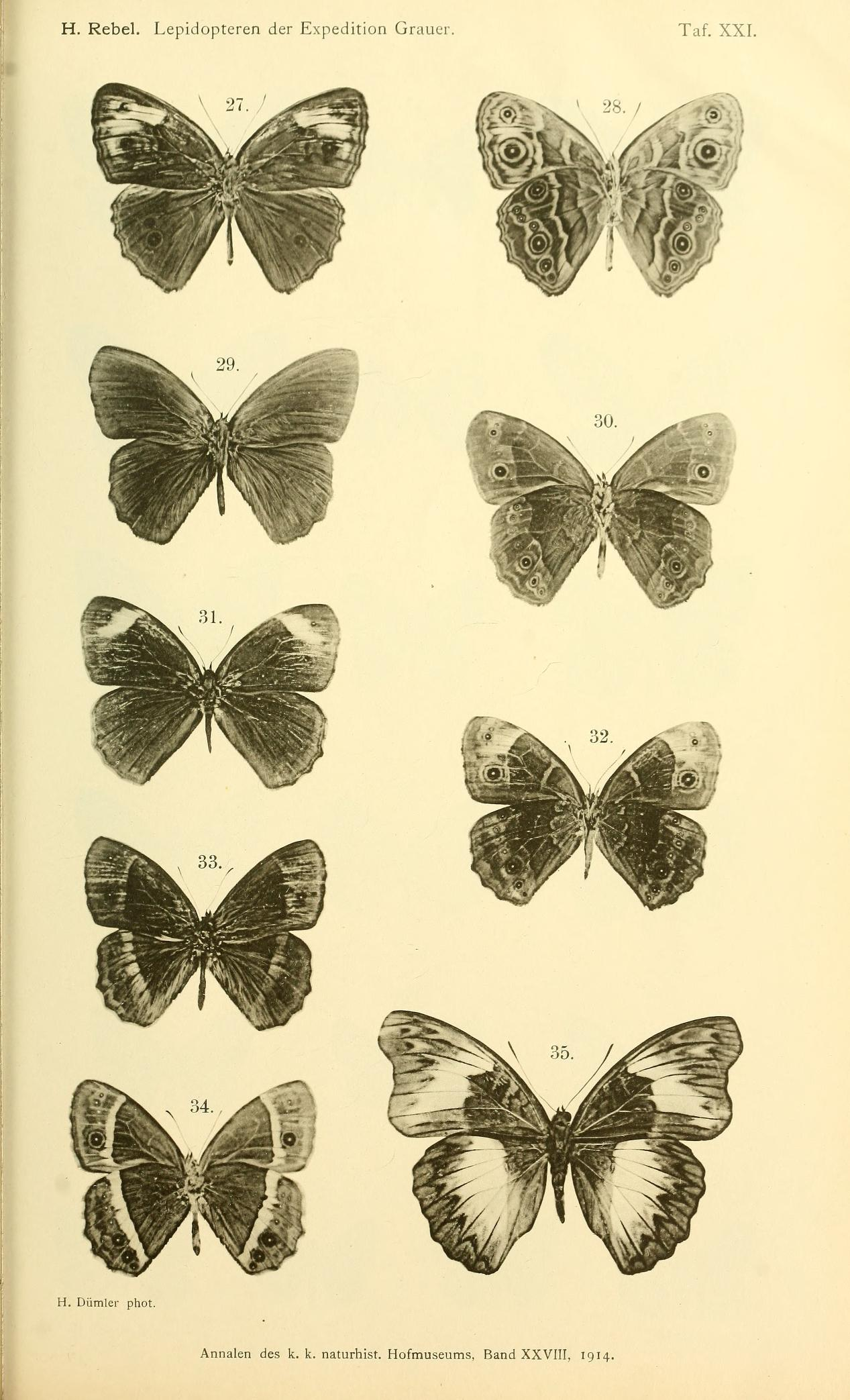
- Figures 27 and 28

Scientific classification
- Kingdom: Animalia
- Phylum: Arthropoda
- Class: Insecta
- Order: Lepidoptera
- Family: Nymphalidae
- Genus: Bicyclus
- Species: B. alboplaga

Binomial name
- Bicyclus alboplaga (Rebel, 1914)

Synonyms
- Mycalesis alboplaga Rebel, 1914

= Bicyclus alboplaga =

Species of butterfly

Bicyclus alboplaga is a butterfly in the family Nymphalidae. It is found in the Republic of the Congo, the Democratic Republic of the Congo, the Central African Republic and Uganda.
