= Bicyclus uniformis =

Uniform bush brown

Scientific classification
- Kingdom: Animalia
- Phylum: Arthropoda
- Clade: Pancrustacea
- Class: Insecta
- Order: Lepidoptera
- Family: Nymphalidae
- Genus: Bicyclus
- Species: B. uniformis

Binomial name
- Bicyclus uniformis (Bethune-Baker, 1908)

Synonyms
- Mycalesis uniformis Bethune-Baker, 1908; Mycalesis ribbei Neustetter, 1916

Species of butterfly

Bicyclus uniformis, the uniform bush brown, is a butterfly in the family Nymphalidae. It is found in Ivory Coast, Ghana, Cameroon, the Central African Republic, the eastern part of the Democratic Republic of the Congo, Uganda, north-western Tanzania and possibly Nigeria. The habitat consists of forests in good condition.

Adults are attracted to fermenting fruit.

Torben Larsen developed a species numbering system for his 2005 publication Butterflies of West Africa. This species is #674. The 'Larsen' numbers have since been used with permission in A Sharp Eye on Butterflies of Ghana.
