= Bicyclus subtilisurae =

Scientific classification
- Kingdom: Animalia
- Phylum: Arthropoda
- Clade: Pancrustacea
- Class: Insecta
- Order: Lepidoptera
- Family: Nymphalidae
- Genus: Bicyclus
- Species: B. subtilisurae

Binomial name
- Bicyclus subtilisurae Brattström et al., 2015

Species of butterfly

Bicyclus subtilisurae is a butterfly in the family Nymphalidae. It is usually found at high altitudes (1000 m) in the Kivu region of the Democratic Republic of the Congo and northwestern Tanzania (Minziro Forest).

== Description ==
This species' wings are uniformly dark brown in both sexes, with a typical wingspan of 27 mm. The forewings have a small apical eyespot surrounded by a faint orange ring.
