= Bicyclus hyperanthus =

Bethune-Baker's bush brown

Scientific classification
- Kingdom: Animalia
- Phylum: Arthropoda
- Clade: Pancrustacea
- Class: Insecta
- Order: Lepidoptera
- Family: Nymphalidae
- Genus: Bicyclus
- Species: B. hyperanthus

Binomial name
- Bicyclus hyperanthus (Bethune-Baker, 1908)

Synonyms
- Mycalesis hyperanthus Bethune-Baker, 1908

Species of butterfly

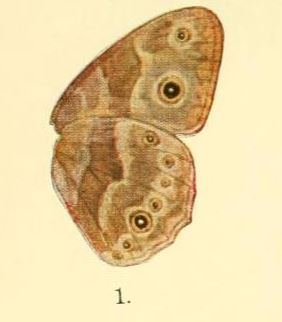

Bicyclus hyperanthus, or Bethune-Baker's bush brown, is a butterfly in the family Nymphalidae. It is found in Ivory Coast, eastern Nigeria, Cameroon, the Democratic Republic of the Congo, western Uganda and north-western Tanzania. The habitat consists of sub-montane forests.
