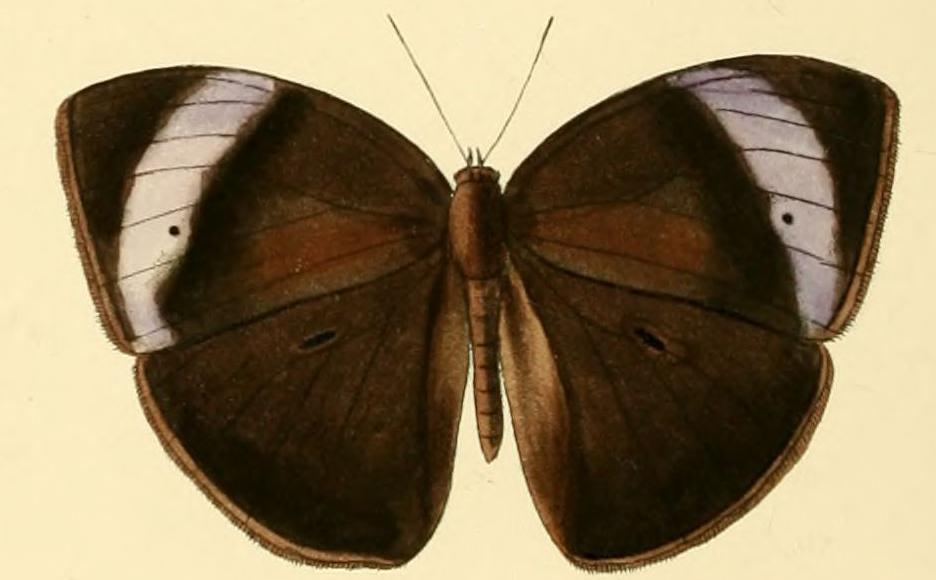

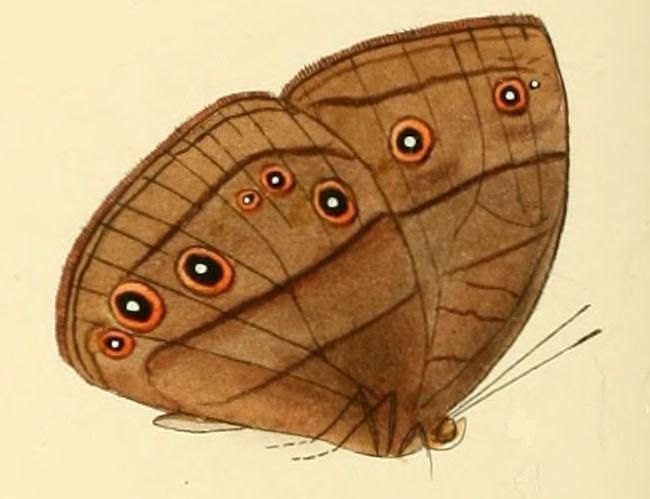

Scientific classification
- Kingdom: Animalia
- Phylum: Arthropoda
- Clade: Pancrustacea
- Class: Insecta
- Order: Lepidoptera
- Family: Nymphalidae
- Genus: Bicyclus
- Species: B. iccius

Binomial name
- Bicyclus iccius (Hewitson, 1865)

Synonyms
- Idiomorphus iccius Hewitson, 1865; Mycalesis iccius ab. transiens Bartel, 1905

= Bicyclus iccius =

Scarce blue-banded bush brown

Species of butterfly

Bicyclus iccius, the scarce blue-banded bush brown, is a butterfly in the family Nymphalidae. It is found in Nigeria, Cameroon, the Republic of the Congo, Angola, the Democratic Republic of the Congo and Uganda. The habitat consists of forests.

The larvae feed on Poaceae species.
