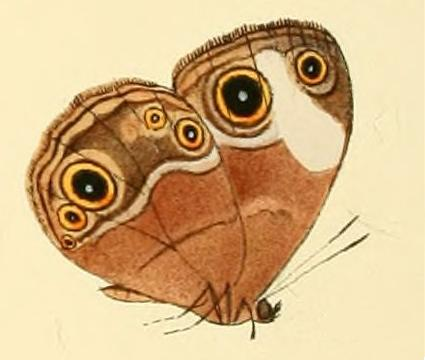

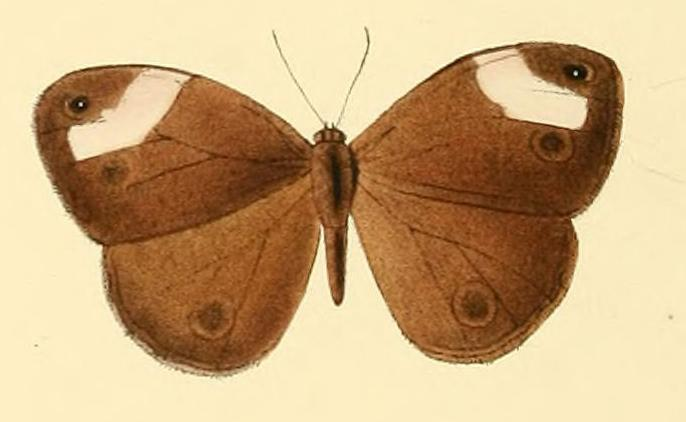

Scientific classification
- Kingdom: Animalia
- Phylum: Arthropoda
- Clade: Pancrustacea
- Class: Insecta
- Order: Lepidoptera
- Family: Nymphalidae
- Genus: Bicyclus
- Species: B. sciathis

Binomial name
- Bicyclus sciathis (Hewitson, 1866)

Synonyms
- Mycalesis sciathis Hewitson, 1866

= Bicyclus sciathis =

Sciathic bush brown

Species of butterfly

Bicyclus sciathis, the Sciathic bush brown, is a butterfly in the family Nymphalidae. It is found in Nigeria, Cameroon, Gabon, the Republic of the Congo and the central part of the Democratic Republic of the Congo. The habitat consists of lowland forests.
