= Bicyclus trilophus =

Scientific classification
- Kingdom: Animalia
- Phylum: Arthropoda
- Clade: Pancrustacea
- Class: Insecta
- Order: Lepidoptera
- Family: Nymphalidae
- Genus: Bicyclus
- Species: B. trilophus

Binomial name
- Bicyclus trilophus (Rebel, 1914)

Synonyms
- Mycalesis trilophus Rebel, 1914; Mycalesis schoutedeni Overlaet, 1954

Species of butterfly

Bicyclus trilophus, the tufted bush brown, is a butterfly in the family Nymphalidae. It is found in Guinea, Sierra Leone, Ivory Coast, Ghana, Nigeria, Cameroon, Gabon, the Republic of the Congo, the Democratic Republic of the Congo and Zambia. The habitat consists of forests.

== Subspecies ==
- Bicyclus trilophus trilophus (Cameroon (east of mountains), Gabon, Congo, Democratic Republic of the Congo, Zambia)
- Bicyclus trilophus jacksoni Condamin, 1961 (Guinea, Sierra Leone, Ivory Coast, Ghana, Nigeria, western Cameroon)
