= Bicyclus mesogena =

Scientific classification
- Kingdom: Animalia
- Phylum: Arthropoda
- Clade: Pancrustacea
- Class: Insecta
- Order: Lepidoptera
- Family: Nymphalidae
- Genus: Bicyclus
- Species: B. mesogena

Binomial name
- Bicyclus mesogena (Karsch, 1894)

Synonyms
- Mycalesis mesogena Karsch, 1894; Mycalesis mesogenina Grünberg, 1911; Mycalesis mohangensis Dufrane, 1945; Mycalesis mesogena ugandae Riley, 1926

Species of butterfly

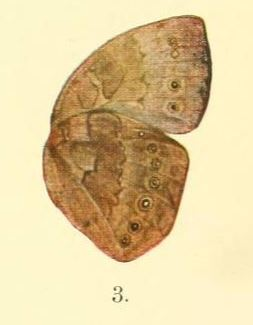

Bicyclus mesogena, the white-line bush brown, is a butterfly in the family Nymphalidae. It is found in Cameroon, the Democratic Republic of the Congo, Uganda, Kenya, Tanzania and Zambia. The habitat consists of forests, including riverine forests.

Adults are attracted to fermenting fruit.

== Subspecies ==
- Bicyclus mesogena mesogena (Cameroon, Democratic Republic of the Congo, western Kenya, Zambia)
- Bicyclus mesogena ugandae (Riley, 1926) (Uganda, Tanzania)
