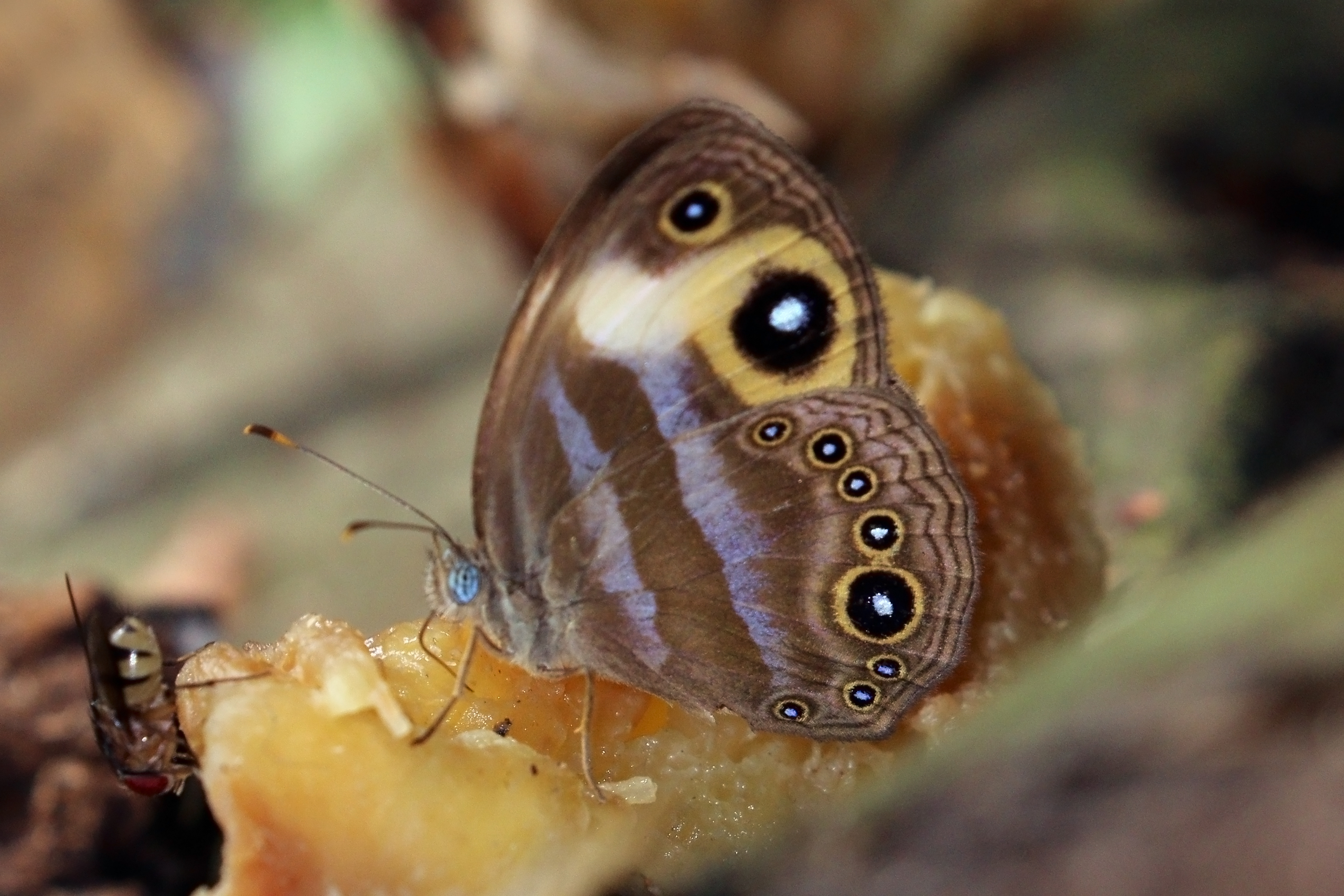
- Female B. larseni in Ghana formerly described as B. nobilis

Scientific classification
- Kingdom: Animalia
- Phylum: Arthropoda
- Clade: Pancrustacea
- Class: Insecta
- Order: Lepidoptera
- Family: Nymphalidae
- Genus: Bicyclus
- Species: B. nobilis

Binomial name
- Bicyclus nobilis (Aurivillius, 1893)

Synonyms
- Mycalesis nobilis Aurivillius, 1893

= Bicyclus nobilis =

Species of butterfly

Bicyclus nobilis, the noble bush brown, is a butterfly in the family Nymphalidae. It is found in Guinea, Sierra Leone, Liberia, Ivory Coast, Nigeria, Cameroon, Gabon and the Republic of the Congo. Species in Ghana are B. larseni. The habitat consists of wetter forests of good quality.
