= Bicyclus tanzanicus =

Scientific classification
- Kingdom: Animalia
- Phylum: Arthropoda
- Clade: Pancrustacea
- Class: Insecta
- Order: Lepidoptera
- Family: Nymphalidae
- Genus: Bicyclus
- Species: B. tanzanicus

Binomial name
- Bicyclus tanzanicus Condamin, 1986

Species of butterfly

Bicyclus tanzanicus is a butterfly in the family Nymphalidae. It is found in western Tanzania.
