= Bicyclus amieti =

Scientific classification
- Kingdom: Animalia
- Phylum: Arthropoda
- Clade: Pancrustacea
- Class: Insecta
- Order: Lepidoptera
- Family: Nymphalidae
- Genus: Bicyclus
- Species: B. amieti

Binomial name
- Bicyclus amieti Libert, 1996

Species of butterfly

Bicyclus amieti is a butterfly in the family Nymphalidae. It is found in Cameroon.
