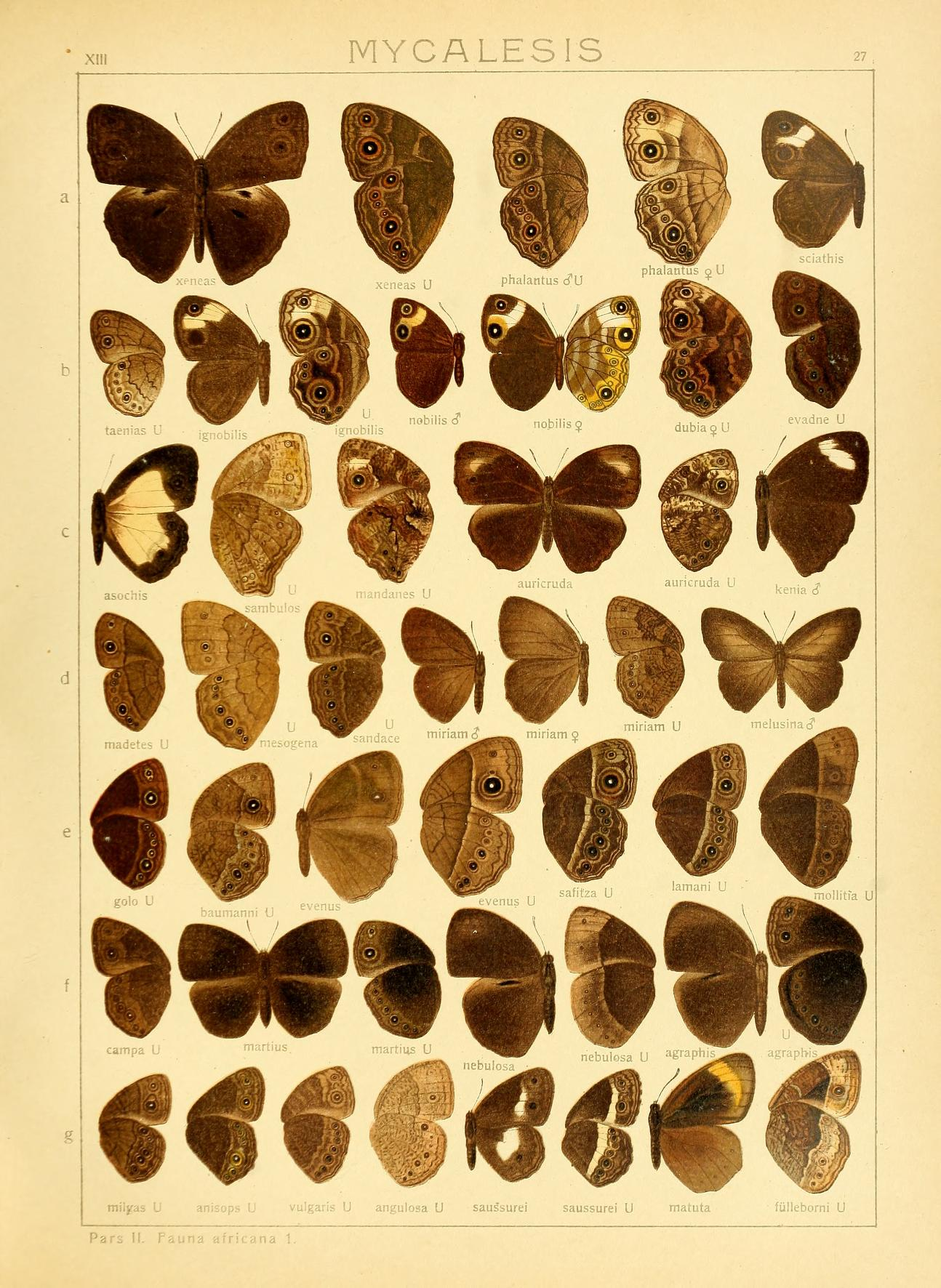

Scientific classification
- Kingdom: Animalia
- Phylum: Arthropoda
- Clade: Pancrustacea
- Class: Insecta
- Order: Lepidoptera
- Family: Nymphalidae
- Genus: Bicyclus
- Species: B. mollitia

Binomial name
- Bicyclus mollitia (Karsch, 1895)

Synonyms
- Mycalesis mollitia Karsch, 1895; Mycalesis ansorgei Sharpe, 1896

= Bicyclus mollitia =

Species of butterfly

Bicyclus mollitia is a butterfly in the family Nymphalidae. It is found in southern Cameroon, the Central African Republic, the southern and eastern part of the Democratic Republic of the Congo, Uganda, western Kenya and north-western Tanzania. The habitat consists of forests.
