= Bicyclus nachtetis =

Scientific classification
- Kingdom: Animalia
- Phylum: Arthropoda
- Clade: Pancrustacea
- Class: Insecta
- Order: Lepidoptera
- Family: Nymphalidae
- Genus: Bicyclus
- Species: B. nachtetis

Binomial name
- Bicyclus nachtetis Condamin, 1965

Species of butterfly

Bicyclus nachtetis is a butterfly in the family Nymphalidae. It is found in Cameroon, the Democratic Republic of the Congo, Angola, north-western Tanzania and possibly Uganda. The habitat consists of swamp forests.

Adults are attracted to fermenting bananas.
