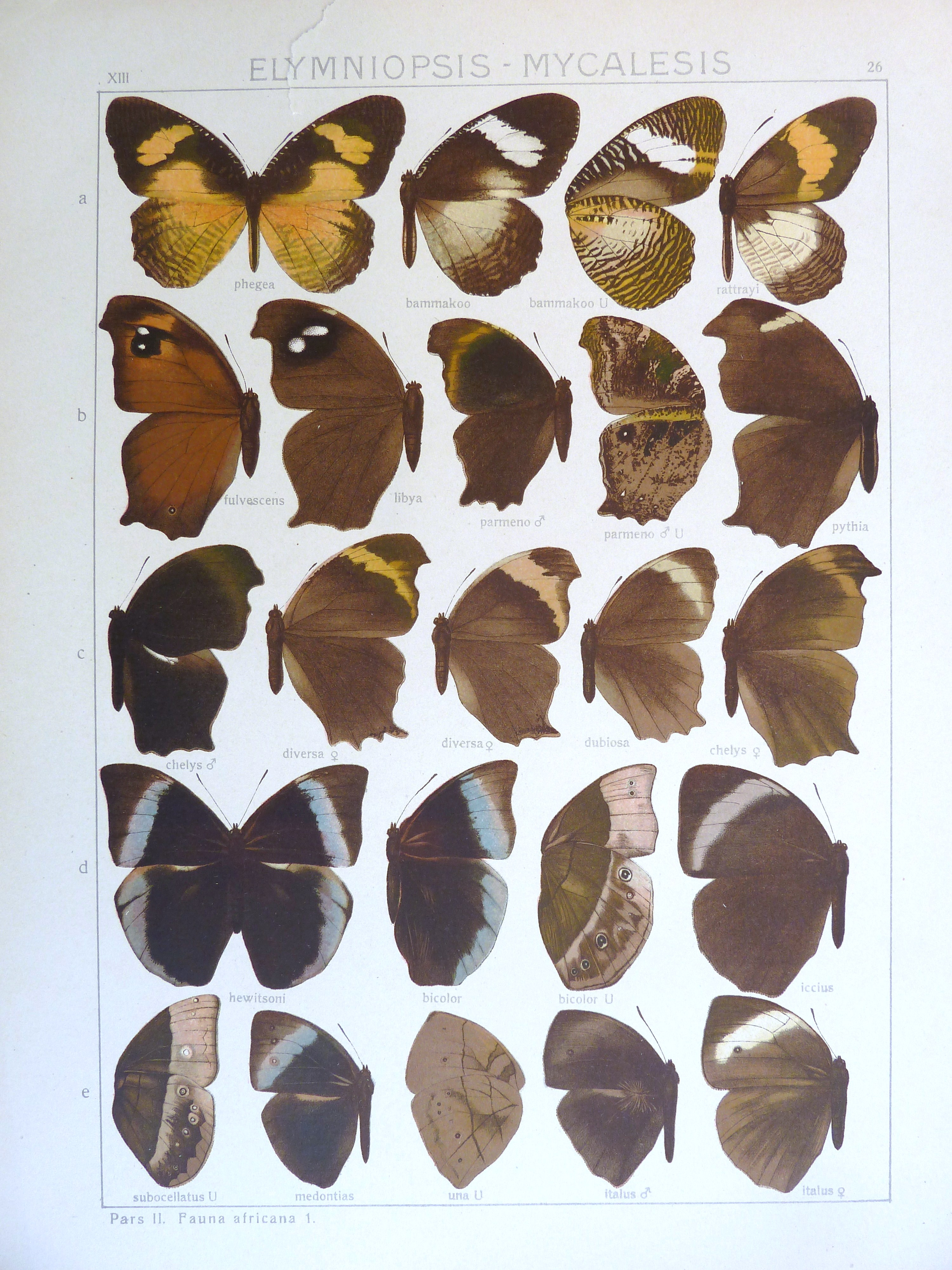
- In Adalbert Seitz's Fauna Africana under various names

Scientific classification
- Kingdom: Animalia
- Phylum: Arthropoda
- Clade: Pancrustacea
- Class: Insecta
- Order: Lepidoptera
- Family: Nymphalidae
- Genus: Bicyclus
- Species: B. hewitsonii

Binomial name
- Bicyclus hewitsonii (Doumet, 1861)

Synonyms
- Idiomorphus hewitsoni Doumet, 1861; Idiomorphus nanodes Grose-Smith, 1890; Mycalesis bicolor Bartel, 1905; Mycalesis subocellatus Bartel, 1905; Mycalesis owassae Schultze, 1914; Mycalesis nanodes nyongensis Birket-Smith, 1960; Bicyclus hewitsoni

= Bicyclus hewitsonii =

Species of butterfly

Bicyclus hewitsonii, the large blue-banded bush brown, is a butterfly in the family Nymphalidae. It is endemic to Nigeria, Cameroon, Bioko, Gabon, the Republic of the Congo, the Central African Republic and the Democratic Republic of the Congo. The habitat consists of dense primary forests.

Adults are often found feeding from fallen fruit.
