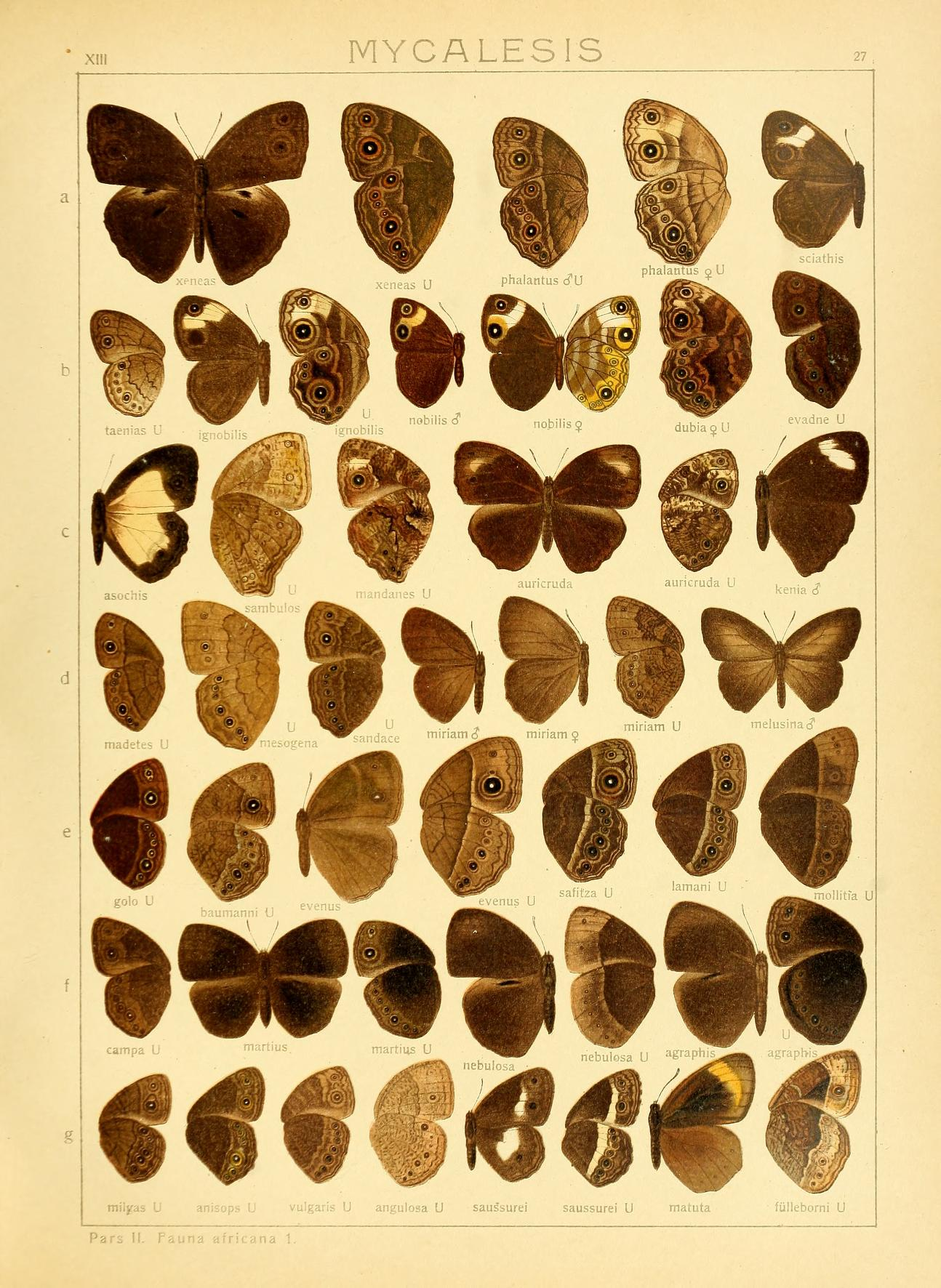

Scientific classification
- Kingdom: Animalia
- Phylum: Arthropoda
- Clade: Pancrustacea
- Class: Insecta
- Order: Lepidoptera
- Family: Nymphalidae
- Genus: Bicyclus
- Species: B. dubia

Binomial name
- Bicyclus dubia (Aurivillius, 1893)

Synonyms
- Mycalesis dubia Aurivillius, 1893

= Bicyclus dubia =

Dubious scalloped bush brown

Species of butterfly

Bicyclus dubia, the dubious scalloped bush brown, is a butterfly in the family Nymphalidae. It is found in Cameroon, the Central African Republic, the southern part of the Democratic Republic of the Congo, western Uganda, north-western Tanzania and north-western Zambia. The habitat consists of swamp and riverine forests.

Adults are attracted to fermented bananas.

The larvae feed on Poaceae species.
