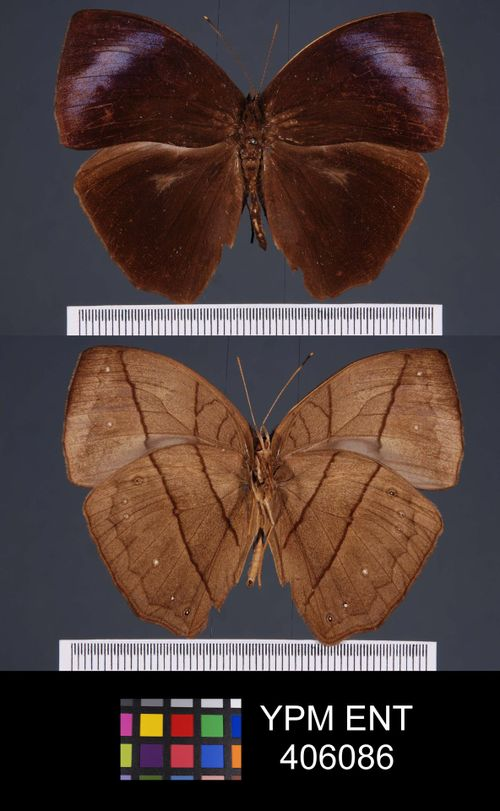

Scientific classification
- Kingdom: Animalia
- Phylum: Arthropoda
- Class: Insecta
- Order: Lepidoptera
- Family: Nymphalidae
- Genus: Bicyclus
- Species: B. graueri

Binomial name
- Bicyclus graueri (Rebel, 1914)

Synonyms
- Mycalesis graueri Rebel, 1914

= Bicyclus graueri =

Grauer's bush brown

Species of butterfly

Bicyclus graueri, or Grauer's bush brown, is a butterfly in the family Nymphalidae. It is found in Nigeria, Cameroon, the Democratic Republic of the Congo, Uganda and western Tanzania. The habitat consists of sub-montane forests.

== Subspecies ==
- Bicyclus graueri graueri (eastern Democratic Republic of the Congo, Uganda, north-western Tanzania)
- Bicyclus graueri choveti Libert, 1996 (eastern Nigeria, western Cameroon)
