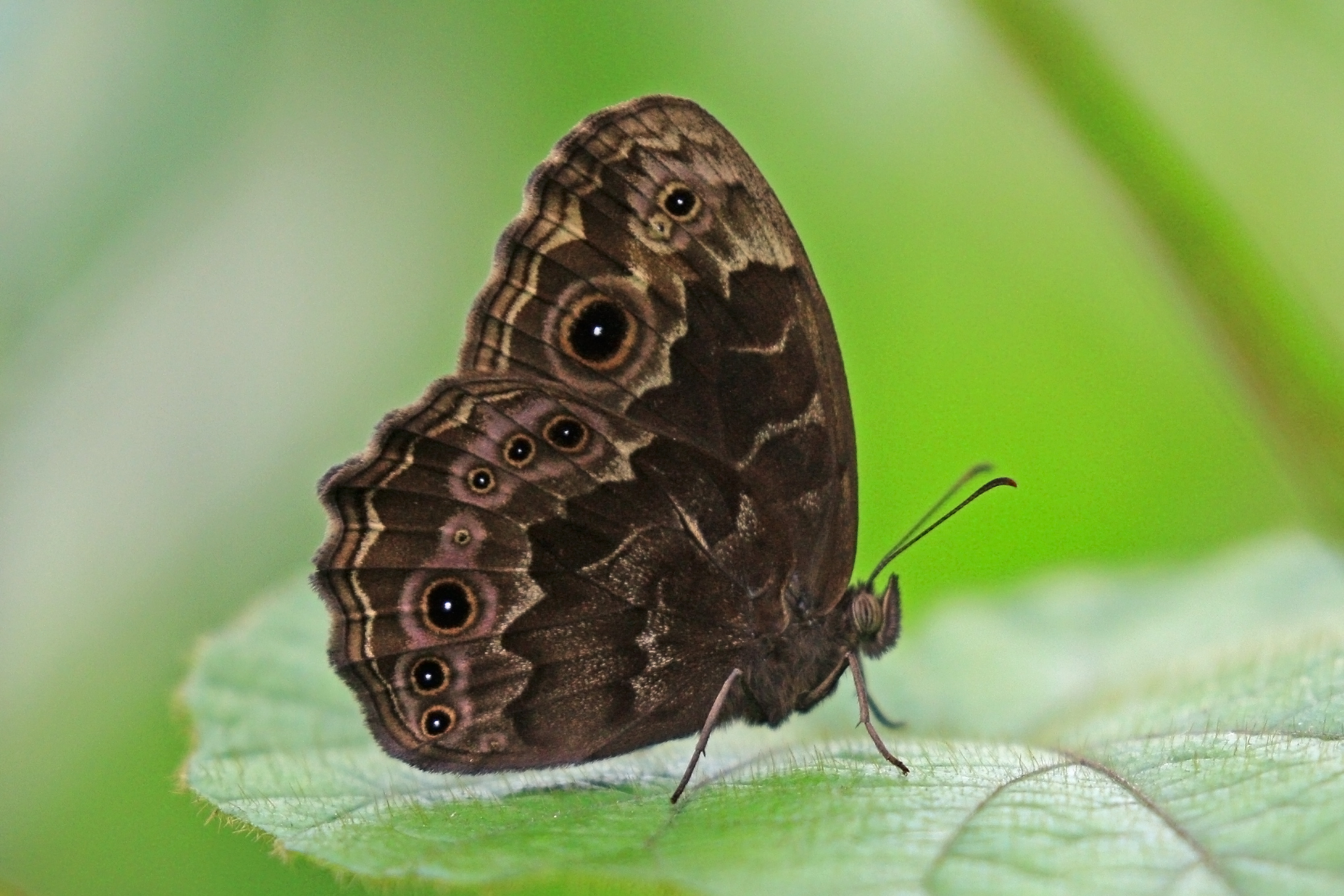
- Queen Elizabeth Park, Uganda

Scientific classification
- Kingdom: Animalia
- Phylum: Arthropoda
- Clade: Pancrustacea
- Class: Insecta
- Order: Lepidoptera
- Family: Nymphalidae
- Genus: Bicyclus
- Species: B. dentata

Binomial name
- Bicyclus dentata (Sharpe, 1898)

Synonyms
- Mycalesis dentata Sharpe, 1898; Mycalesis fluviatilis Grose-Smith, 1898

= Bicyclus dentata =

Dentate bush brown

Species of butterfly

Bicyclus dentata, the dentate bush brown, is a butterfly in the family Nymphalidae. It is found in western and central Kenya, western Uganda, Tanzania, Rwanda, Burundi and the Democratic Republic of the Congo. The habitat consists of semi-montane and montane forests.

Adults are attracted to fermenting fruit.
