= Bicyclus feae =

Scientific classification
- Kingdom: Animalia
- Phylum: Arthropoda
- Clade: Pancrustacea
- Class: Insecta
- Order: Lepidoptera
- Family: Nymphalidae
- Genus: Bicyclus
- Species: B. feae

Binomial name
- Bicyclus feae (Aurivillius, 1910)

Synonyms
- Mycalesis feae Aurivillius, 1910

Species of butterfly

Bicyclus feae is a butterfly in the family Nymphalidae. It is found on Bioko, an island off the west coast of Africa.
