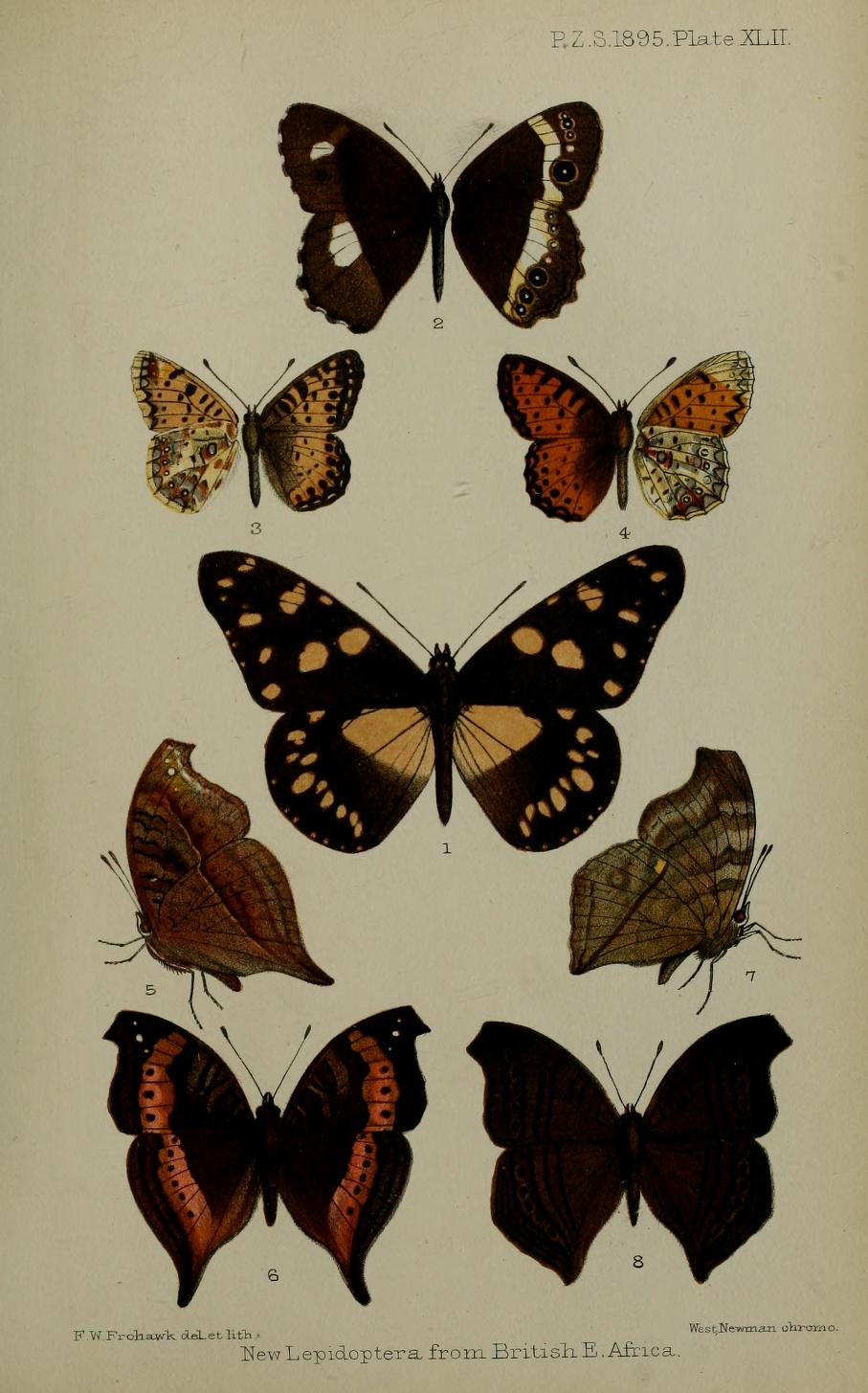
- Figure 2

Scientific classification
- Kingdom: Animalia
- Phylum: Arthropoda
- Clade: Pancrustacea
- Class: Insecta
- Order: Lepidoptera
- Family: Nymphalidae
- Genus: Bicyclus
- Species: B. aurivillii

Binomial name
- Bicyclus aurivillii (Butler, 1896)

Synonyms
- Mycalesis aurivillii Butler, 1896; Mycalesis aurivillii kivuensis Joicey & Talbot, 1924; Mycalesis aurivillii var. birungae Aurivillius, 1925

= Bicyclus aurivillii =

Species of butterfly

Bicyclus aurivillii is a butterfly in the family Nymphalidae. It is found in the Democratic Republic of the Congo, Uganda, Rwanda and Burundi.

== Description ==
M. aurivillii Btlr. is similar to the preceding species [M. saussurei Dew.], but differs in having the basal part of the wings above blackish, in the forewing having only small white spots in cellules 3 and 4 and only blind, indistinct eye-spots and the hindwing having only a rather large white spot between veins 3 and 6, but no eye-spots; the eye-spots on the under surface almost exactly as in saussurei; the species is larger than saussurei and has the fringes chequered with white and brown, on the hindwing strongly undulate. In the female the hindwing has only one hair-pencil, the pencil in cellule 6 being absent. German East Africa; Ruanda and Ruwenzori.

== Subspecies ==
- Bicyclus aurivillii aurivillii (border between the Democratic Republic of the Congo and Uganda)
- Bicyclus aurivillii kivuensis (Joicey & Talbot, 1924) (north-eastern Democratic Republic of the Congo, south-western Uganda, Rwanda, Burundi)
