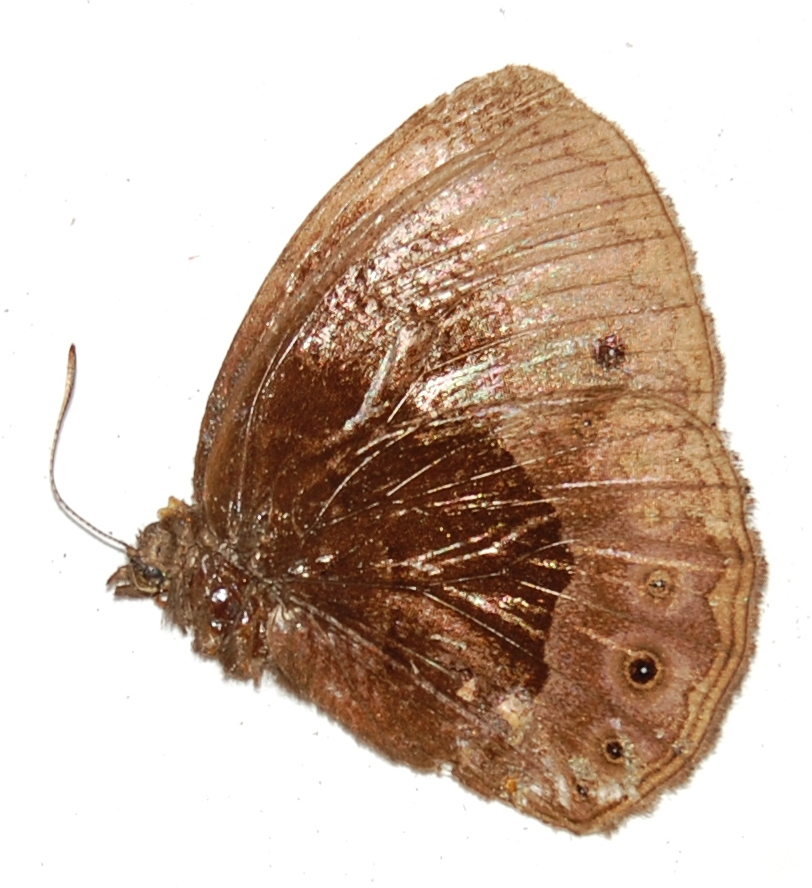

Scientific classification
- Kingdom: Animalia
- Phylum: Arthropoda
- Clade: Pancrustacea
- Class: Insecta
- Order: Lepidoptera
- Family: Nymphalidae
- Genus: Bicyclus
- Species: B. buea

Binomial name
- Bicyclus buea (Strand, 1912)

Synonyms
- Mycalesis (Monotrichtis) buea Strand, 1912; Mycalesis benitonis Strand, 1913; Mycalesis mildbraedi Gaede, 1915

= Bicyclus buea =

Species of butterfly

Bicyclus buea, the small black bush brown, is a butterfly in the family Nymphalidae. It is found in eastern Nigeria, Cameroon, Equatorial Guinea, Angola, the Democratic Republic of the Congo, Uganda, western Kenya and north-western Tanzania. The habitat consists of dense and sub-montane forests.

Both sexes are attracted to fermented fruit.
