= Bicyclus condamini =

Ebony bush brown

Scientific classification
- Kingdom: Animalia
- Phylum: Arthropoda
- Clade: Pancrustacea
- Class: Insecta
- Order: Lepidoptera
- Family: Nymphalidae
- Genus: Bicyclus
- Species: B. condamini

Binomial name
- Bicyclus condamini van Son, 1963

Species of butterfly

Bicyclus condamini, the ebony bush brown, is a butterfly in the family Nymphalidae. It is found in eastern Zimbabwe. The habitat consists of montane forests.

Adults are on wing year round, with a peak in August, September and December. There are distinct seasonal forms.
