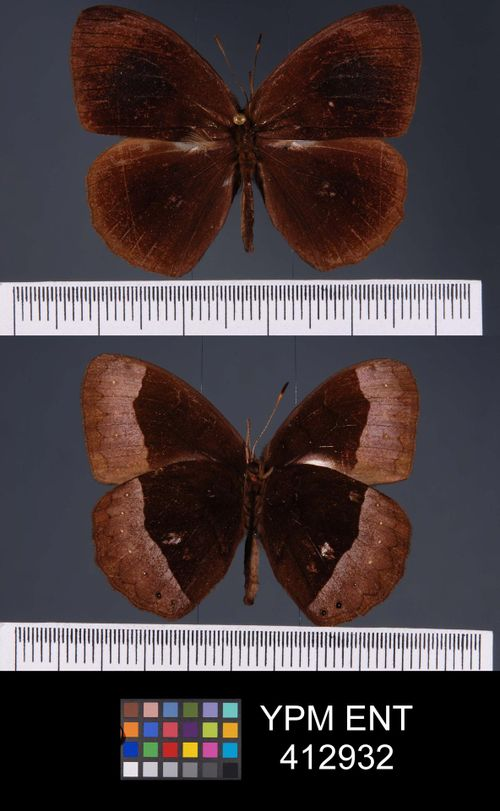

Scientific classification
- Kingdom: Animalia
- Phylum: Arthropoda
- Clade: Pancrustacea
- Class: Insecta
- Order: Lepidoptera
- Family: Nymphalidae
- Genus: Bicyclus
- Species: B. sophrosyne

Binomial name
- Bicyclus sophrosyne (Plötz, 1880)

Synonyms
- Mycalesis sophrosyne Plötz, 1880; Mycalesis ploetzi Bartel, 1905; Mycalesis sophrosyne ab. decemoculi Birket-Smith, 1960

= Bicyclus sophrosyne =

Large velvet bush brown

Species of butterfly

Bicyclus sophrosyne, the large velvet bush brown, is a butterfly in the family Nymphalidae. It is found in Nigeria, Cameroon, the Republic of the Congo, the Central African Republic, the Democratic Republic of the Congo, Uganda, Kenya, Tanzania and Zambia.

== Description ==
Male: wings above dark brown, at the distal margin and before the apex of the forewing somewhat lighter, forewing in the middle with a large, irregular black velvety spot which covers the proximal part of cellules 2 and 3, as well as the adjoining parts of cellules lb and 4;on the under surface the basal part is unicolorous dark brown and distally bordered by a slightly darker median line, with violet-grey distal margining; the median line is almost regular, on the forewing distinctly curved and on the hindwing weakly excurved between veins 3 and 5; in the violet-grey, brown-spotted marginal area there are on the forewing 2—3 and on the hindwing 5—6 eye-spots; these are black, white-pupilled and with a yellow and a dark brown ring; the spot in cellule 2 is larger than the rest and of the same size on both wings, the one in cellule 3 is absent and that in cellule 4 of the hindwing is small or absent; the spot in cellule 6 of the hindwing is somewhat larger than the one in cellule 5; but the one in cellule 6 of the forewing much smaller than that in cellule 5. The ? is lighter than the cf. — Cameroons and Congo.

== Biology ==
The habitat consists of sub-montane forest.

== Subspecies ==
- Bicyclus sophrosyne sophrosyne (eastern Nigeria, Cameroon, Congo, Central African Republic, northern Democratic Republic of the Congo, Uganda, western Kenya, north-western Tanzania)
- Bicyclus sophrosyne overlaeti Condamin, 1965 (south-eastern Democratic Republic of the Congo, Zambia)
