= Bicyclus mahale =

Scientific classification
- Kingdom: Animalia
- Phylum: Arthropoda
- Clade: Pancrustacea
- Class: Insecta
- Order: Lepidoptera
- Family: Nymphalidae
- Genus: Bicyclus
- Species: B. mahale

Binomial name
- Bicyclus mahale Congdon, Kielland & Collins, 1998

Species of butterfly

Bicyclus mahale is a butterfly in the family Nymphalidae. It is found in south-western Tanzania. The habitat consists of dense forests at altitudes between 800 and 1,000 meters.

Adults are attracted to fermenting bananas.
