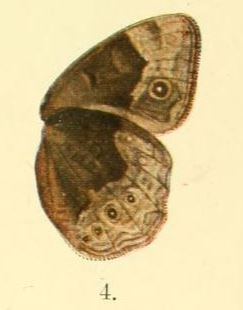

Scientific classification
- Kingdom: Animalia
- Phylum: Arthropoda
- Clade: Pancrustacea
- Class: Insecta
- Order: Lepidoptera
- Family: Nymphalidae
- Genus: Bicyclus
- Species: B. campus

Binomial name
- Bicyclus campus (Karsch, 1893)

Synonyms
- Mycalesis campus Karsch, 1893; Mycalesis baumanni Karsch, 1894; Mycalesis olivia Grünberg, 1911

= Bicyclus campus =

Hill bush brown

Species of butterfly

Bicyclus campus, the hill bush brown, is a butterfly in the family Nymphalidae. It is found in Guinea, Ivory Coast, Ghana, Togo, Benin, Nigeria, northern Cameroon, northern Angola, the Democratic Republic of the Congo, southern Sudan, Uganda, western Kenya and eastern Tanzania. The habitat consists of hilly terrain with forest/savanna mosaic.
