= Bicyclus matuta =

Scientific classification
- Kingdom: Animalia
- Phylum: Arthropoda
- Clade: Pancrustacea
- Class: Insecta
- Order: Lepidoptera
- Family: Nymphalidae
- Genus: Bicyclus
- Species: B. matuta

Binomial name
- Bicyclus matuta (Karsch, 1894)

Synonyms
- Mycalesis matuta Karsch, 1894; Mycalesis eleutheria Rebel, 1911

Species of butterfly

Bicyclus matuta is a butterfly in the family Nymphalidae. It is found in the Democratic Republic of the Congo, Uganda, Rwanda and Burundi.

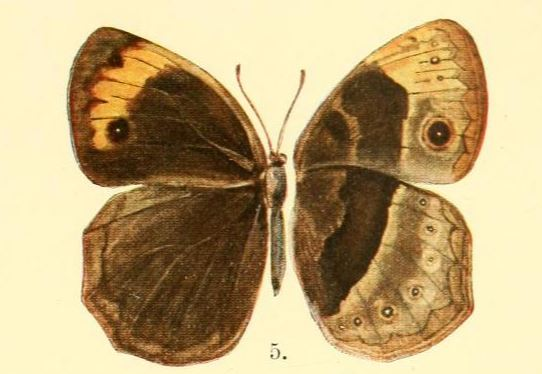

== Subspecies ==
- Bicyclus matuta matuta (Democratic Republic of the Congo: east to Kivu, Uganda: south-west to Kigezi, Rwanda, Burundi)
- Bicyclus matutaidjwiensis Condamin, 1965 (Democratic Republic of the Congo: Kwidgwi Island, Lake Kivu)
