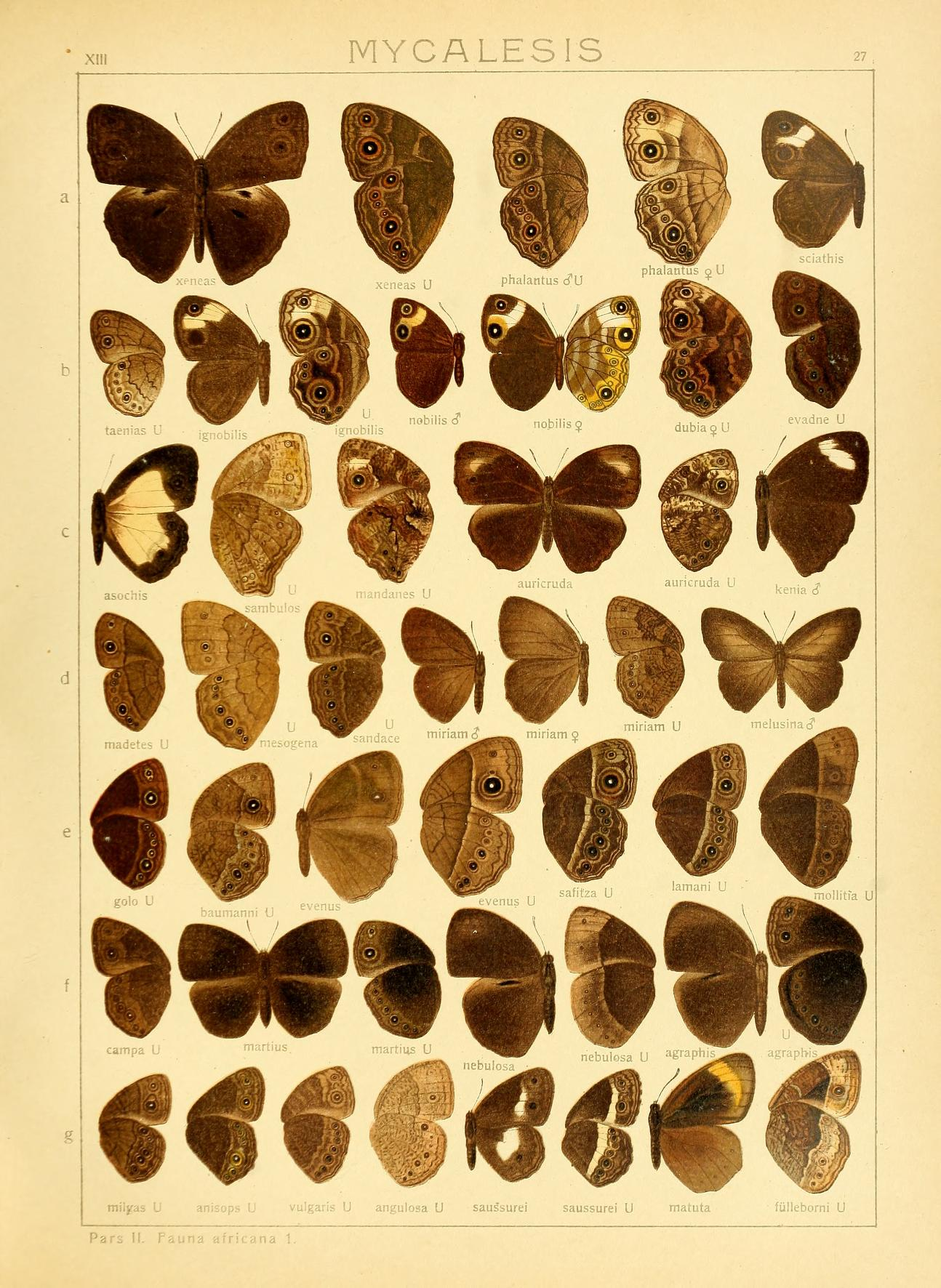

Scientific classification
- Kingdom: Animalia
- Phylum: Arthropoda
- Clade: Pancrustacea
- Class: Insecta
- Order: Lepidoptera
- Family: Nymphalidae
- Genus: Bicyclus
- Species: B. lamani

Binomial name
- Bicyclus lamani (Aurivillius, 1900)

Synonyms
- Mycalesis lamani Aurivillius, 1900

= Bicyclus lamani =

Species of butterfly

Bicyclus lamani is a butterfly in the family Nymphalidae. It is found in Gabon, northern Angola and the Democratic Republic of the Congo. The habitat consists of open grassy woodland at altitudes between 700 and 1,500 meters.
