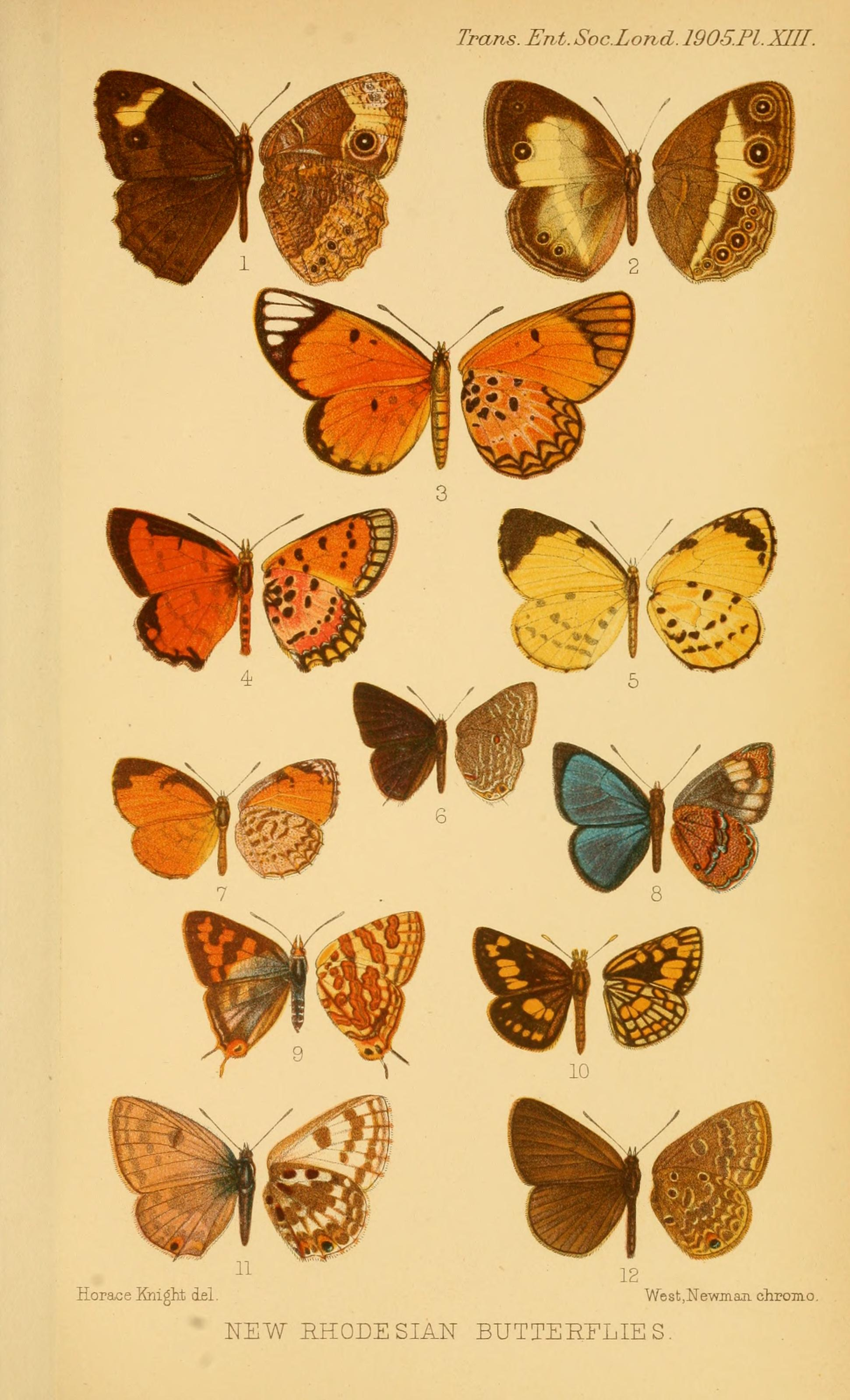
- Figure 1 which accompanied the original description

Scientific classification
- Kingdom: Animalia
- Phylum: Arthropoda
- Clade: Pancrustacea
- Class: Insecta
- Order: Lepidoptera
- Family: Nymphalidae
- Genus: Bicyclus
- Species: B. cooksoni

Binomial name
- Bicyclus cooksoni (H. H. Druce, 1905)

Synonyms
- Mycalesis cooksoni H. H. Druce, 1905; Mycalesis cooksoni f. latior Riley, 1921

= Bicyclus cooksoni =

Species of butterfly

Bicyclus cooksoni is a butterfly in the family Nymphalidae first described by Hamilton Herbert Druce in 1905. It is found in northern Zambia, the Democratic Republic of the Congo, southern and western Tanzania and Zimbabwe. The habitat consists of Brachystegia woodland and open montane grassland-forest mosaic.
