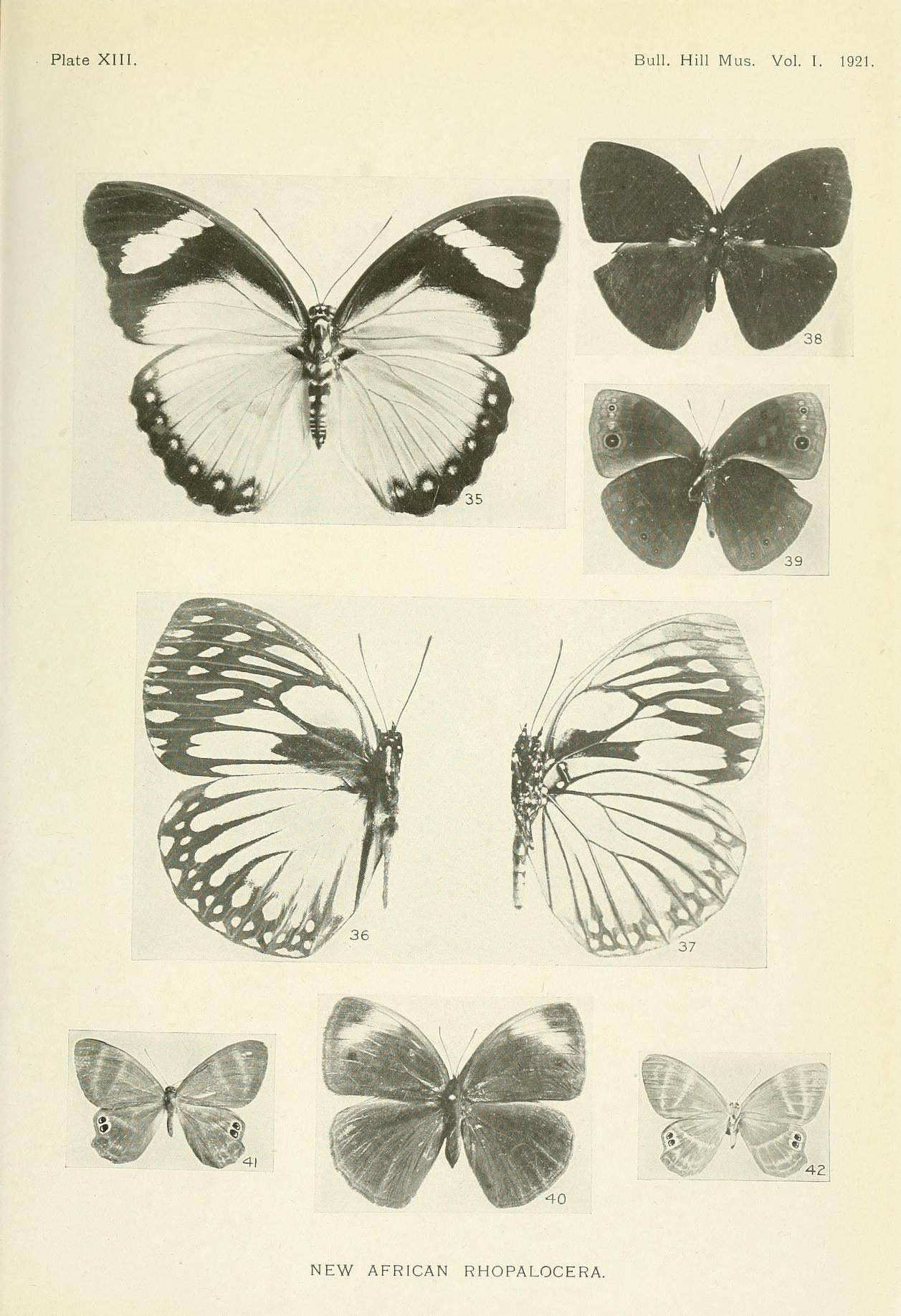
- Figure 38 male, 39 male underside and 40 female - from the original description

Scientific classification
- Kingdom: Animalia
- Phylum: Arthropoda
- Clade: Pancrustacea
- Class: Insecta
- Order: Lepidoptera
- Family: Nymphalidae
- Genus: Bicyclus
- Species: B. persimilis

Binomial name
- Bicyclus persimilis (Joicey & Talbot, 1921)

Synonyms
- Mycalesis persimilis Joicey and Talbot, 1921

= Bicyclus persimilis =

Species of butterfly

Bicyclus persimilis is a butterfly in the family Nymphalidae. It is found in the border region of the Democratic Republic of the Congo and Uganda, as well as in Rwanda and Burundi.
