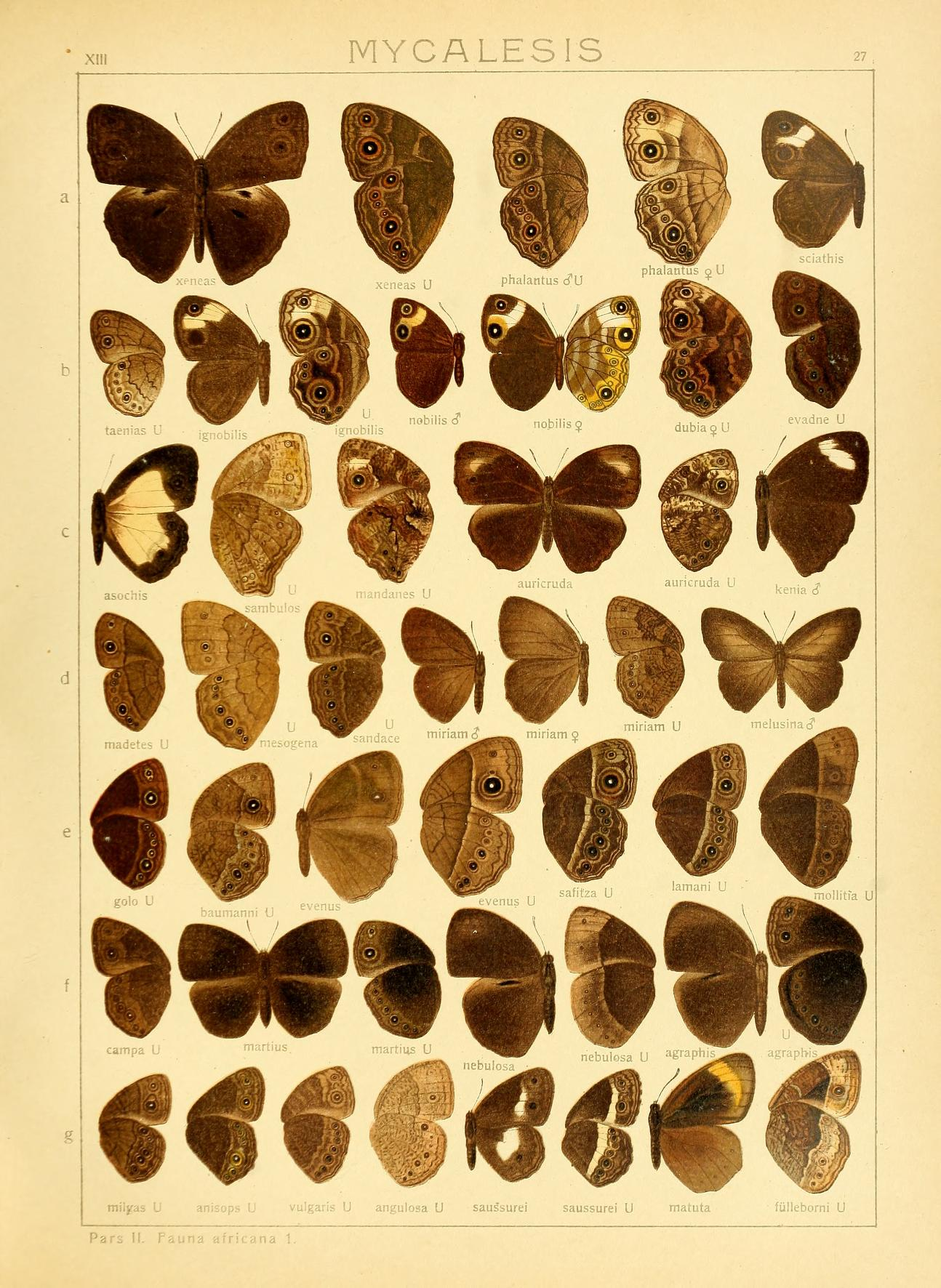
- e

Scientific classification
- Kingdom: Animalia
- Phylum: Arthropoda
- Clade: Pancrustacea
- Class: Insecta
- Order: Lepidoptera
- Family: Nymphalidae
- Genus: Bicyclus
- Species: B. golo

Binomial name
- Bicyclus golo (Aurivillius, 1893)

Synonyms
- Mycalesis golo Aurivillius, 1893; Mycalesis golo var. violascens Aurivillius, 1899; Mycalesis golo var. obliterata Grünberg, 1911; Mycalesis golo ab. goloides Strand, 1913

= Bicyclus golo =

Species of butterfly

Bicyclus golo, the golo bush brown, is a butterfly in the family Nymphalidae. It is found in eastern Nigeria, Cameroon, the Republic of the Congo, the Central African Republic, the eastern part of the Democratic Republic of the Congo, Uganda, western Kenya and north-western Tanzania. The habitat consists of dense forests.
