= Bicyclus makomensis =

Scientific classification
- Kingdom: Animalia
- Phylum: Arthropoda
- Clade: Pancrustacea
- Class: Insecta
- Order: Lepidoptera
- Family: Nymphalidae
- Genus: Bicyclus
- Species: B. makomensis

Binomial name
- Bicyclus makomensis Strand, 1913

Synonyms
- Mycalesis procora var. makomensis Strand E. 1913; Bicyclus ewondo Libert M. 1996

Species of butterfly

Bicyclus makomensis is a butterfly in the family Nymphalidae. It is found in southern Cameroon, mainland Equatorial Guinea and most of Gabon.
