= Bicyclus sweadneri =

Fox's blue-banded bush brown

Scientific classification
- Kingdom: Animalia
- Phylum: Arthropoda
- Clade: Pancrustacea
- Class: Insecta
- Order: Lepidoptera
- Family: Nymphalidae
- Genus: Bicyclus
- Species: B. sweadneri

Binomial name
- Bicyclus sweadneri Fox, 1963

Species of butterfly

Bicyclus sweadneri, or Fox's blue-banded bush brown, is a butterfly in the family Nymphalidae. It was described by Richard Middleton Fox in 1963. It is found in eastern Nigeria, Cameroon, the Republic of the Congo, the Central African Republic and the Democratic Republic of the Congo.
