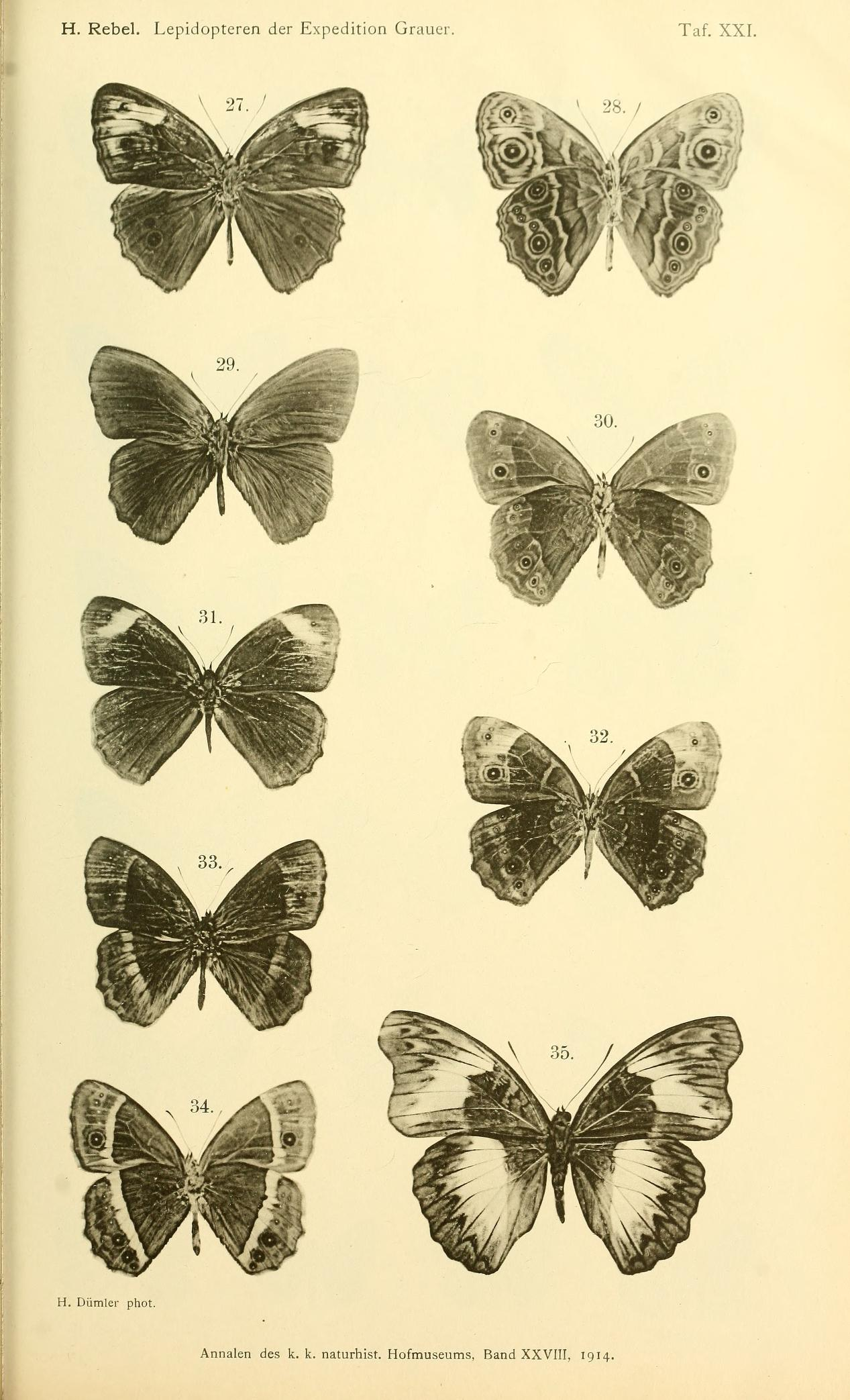
- Figures 29-32

Scientific classification
- Domain: Eukaryota
- Kingdom: Animalia
- Phylum: Arthropoda
- Class: Insecta
- Order: Lepidoptera
- Family: Nymphalidae
- Genus: Bicyclus
- Species: B. neustetteri

Binomial name
- Bicyclus neustetteri (Rebel, 1914)

Synonyms
- Mycalesis neustetteri Rebel, 1914

= Bicyclus neustetteri =

Species of butterfly

Bicyclus neustetteri is a butterfly in the family Nymphalidae. It is found in the Democratic Republic of the Congo and Uganda.
