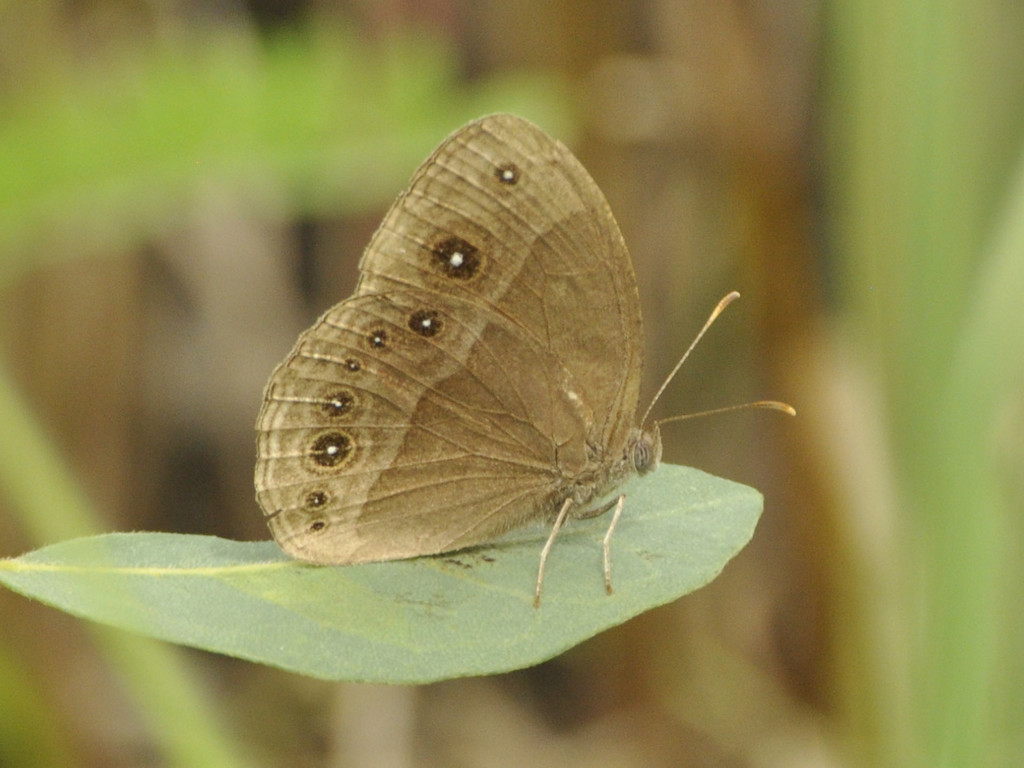

Scientific classification
- Kingdom: Animalia
- Phylum: Arthropoda
- Clade: Pancrustacea
- Class: Insecta
- Order: Lepidoptera
- Family: Nymphalidae
- Genus: Bicyclus
- Species: B. cottrelli

Binomial name
- Bicyclus cottrelli (van Son, 1952)

Synonyms
- Mycalesis cottrelli van Son, 1952; Mycalesis cottrelli harti van Son, 1952; Mycalesis cottrelli cottrelli f. pluvia van Son, 1962

= Bicyclus cottrelli =

Yellow-banded bush brown

Species of butterfly

Bicyclus cottrelli, the yellow-banded bush brown, is a butterfly in the family Nymphalidae. It is found in the Democratic Republic of the Congo, Angola, Tanzania, Zambia, Malawi and northern Zimbabwe. The habitat consists of riparian forests and grassy areas at the margins of forests.

Adults are on wing year round. There are distinct seasonal forms.
