= Bicyclus rileyi =

Scientific classification
- Kingdom: Animalia
- Phylum: Arthropoda
- Clade: Pancrustacea
- Class: Insecta
- Order: Lepidoptera
- Family: Nymphalidae
- Genus: Bicyclus
- Species: B. rileyi

Binomial name
- Bicyclus rileyi Condamin, 1961

Species of butterfly

Bicyclus rileyi is a butterfly in the family Nymphalidae. It is found in Cameroon.
