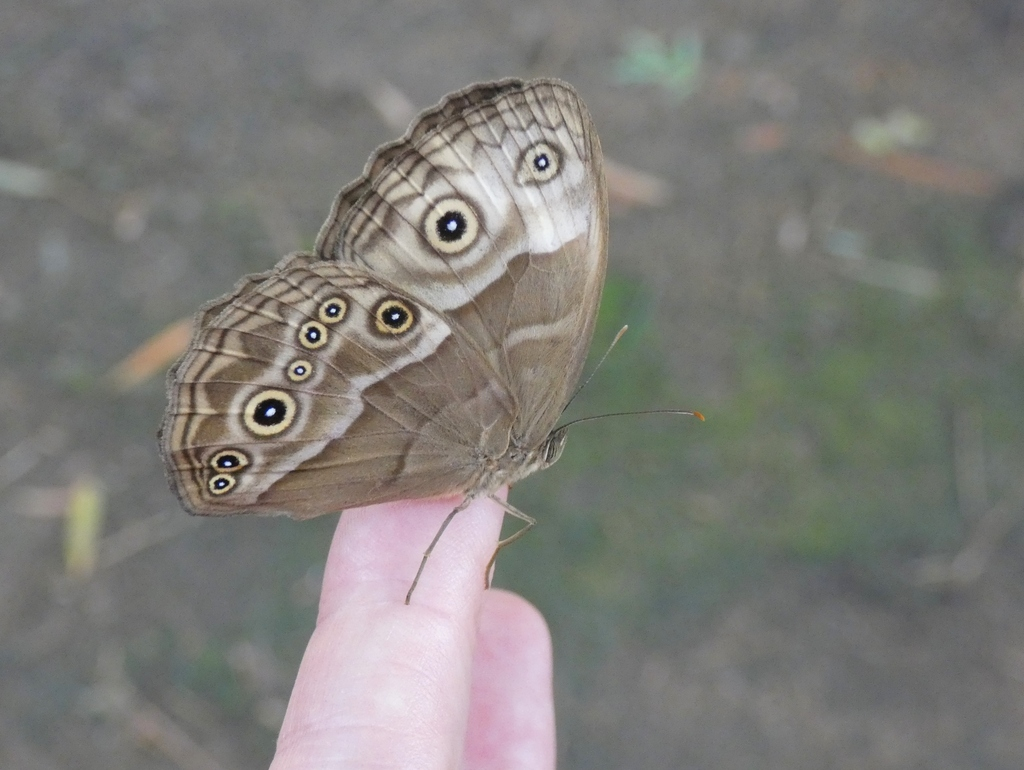

Scientific classification
- Kingdom: Animalia
- Phylum: Arthropoda
- Clade: Pancrustacea
- Class: Insecta
- Order: Lepidoptera
- Family: Nymphalidae
- Genus: Bicyclus
- Species: B. xeneoides

Binomial name
- Bicyclus xeneoides Condamin, 1961

= Bicyclus xeneoides =

Toothed bush brown

Species of butterfly

Bicyclus xeneoides, the toothed bush brown, is a butterfly in the family Nymphalidae. It is found in Nigeria, Cameroon, Bioko, Gabon, the Republic of the Congo, the eastern part of the Democratic Republic of the Congo, Uganda and north-western Tanzania. The habitat consists of forests.
