= Bicyclus pareensis =

Scientific classification
- Kingdom: Animalia
- Phylum: Arthropoda
- Clade: Pancrustacea
- Class: Insecta
- Order: Lepidoptera
- Family: Nymphalidae
- Genus: Bicyclus
- Species: B. pareensis

Binomial name
- Bicyclus pareensis Collins & Kielland, 2008

Species of butterfly

Bicyclus pareensis is a butterfly in the family Nymphalidae. It is found in Tanzania.
