= Bicyclus howarthi =

Scientific classification
- Kingdom: Animalia
- Phylum: Arthropoda
- Clade: Pancrustacea
- Class: Insecta
- Order: Lepidoptera
- Family: Nymphalidae
- Genus: Bicyclus
- Species: B. howarthi

Binomial name
- Bicyclus howarthi Condamin, 1963

Species of butterfly

Bicyclus howarthi is a butterfly in the family Nymphalidae. It is found in Cameroon, Equatorial Guinea and Gabon.
