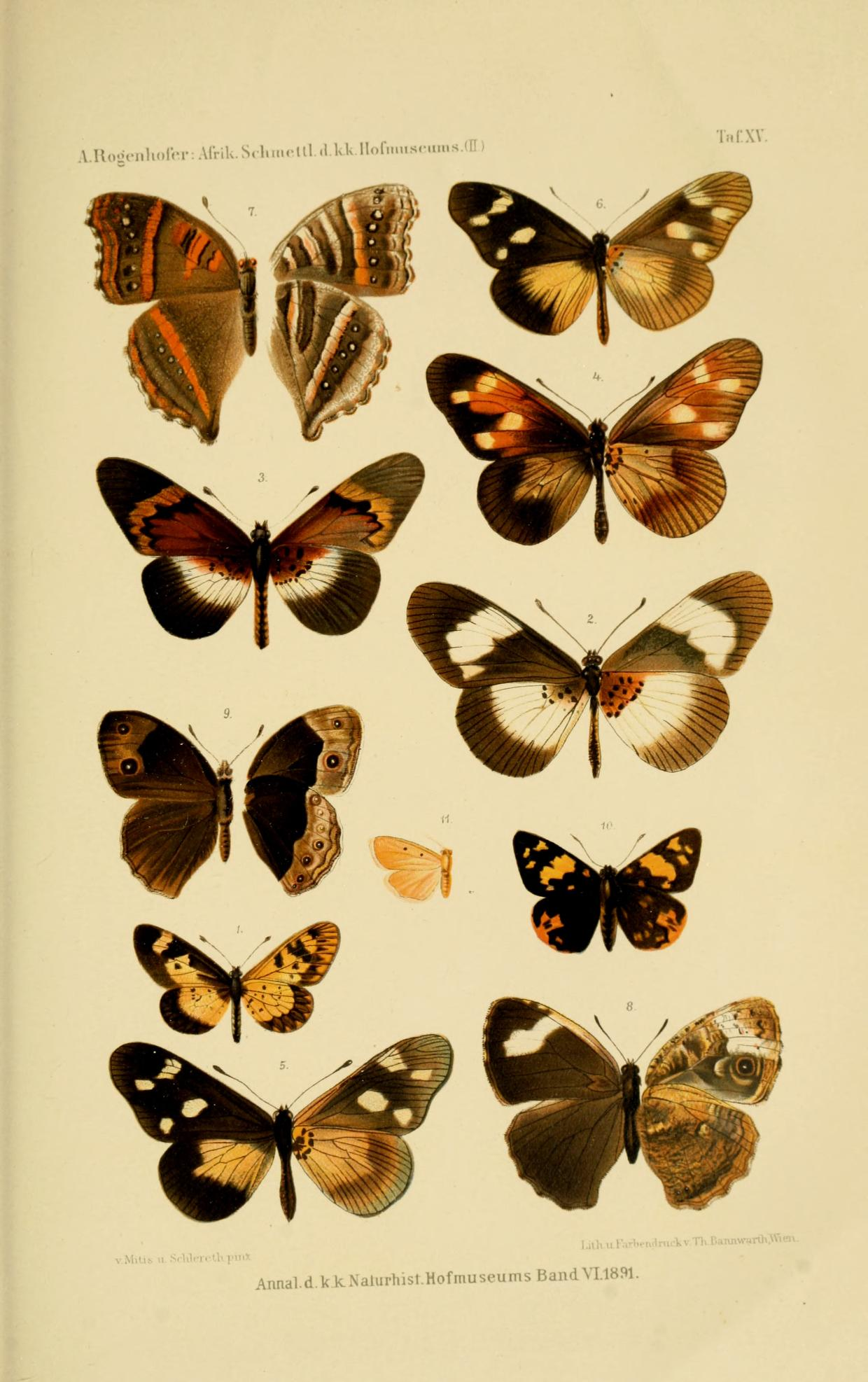
- Figure 8

Scientific classification
- Kingdom: Animalia
- Phylum: Arthropoda
- Clade: Pancrustacea
- Class: Insecta
- Order: Lepidoptera
- Family: Nymphalidae
- Genus: Bicyclus
- Species: B. kenia

Binomial name
- Bicyclus kenia (Rogenhofer, 1891)

Synonyms
- Mycalesis kenia Rogenhofer, 1891; Mycalesis keniax var. inocellata Gaede, 1915

= Bicyclus kenia =

Kenyan bush brown

Species of butterfly

Bicyclus kenia, the Kenyan bush brown, is a butterfly in the family Nymphalidae. It is found in central and south-western Kenya, northern Tanzania, Uganda (the north shore of Lake Victoria) and southern Sudan. The habitat consists of montane forests.

Adults feed on fallen fruit.
