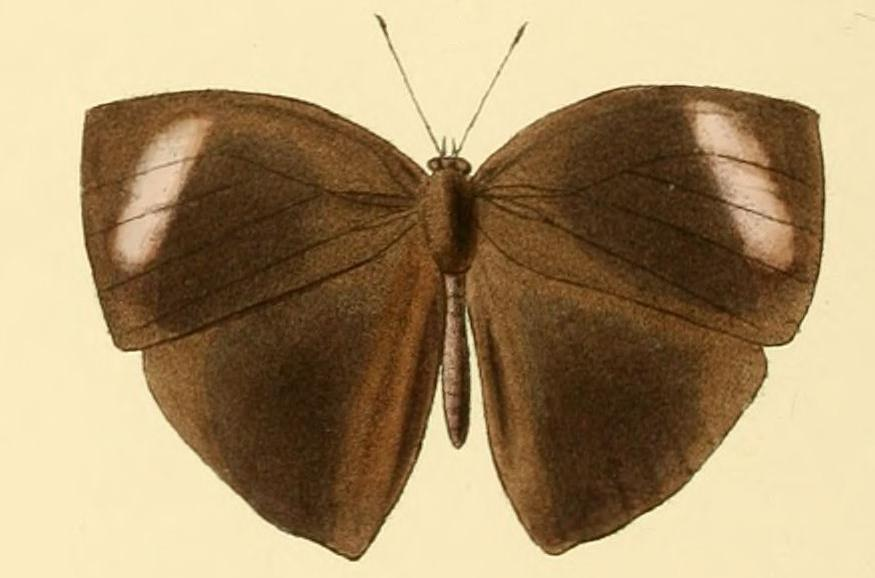

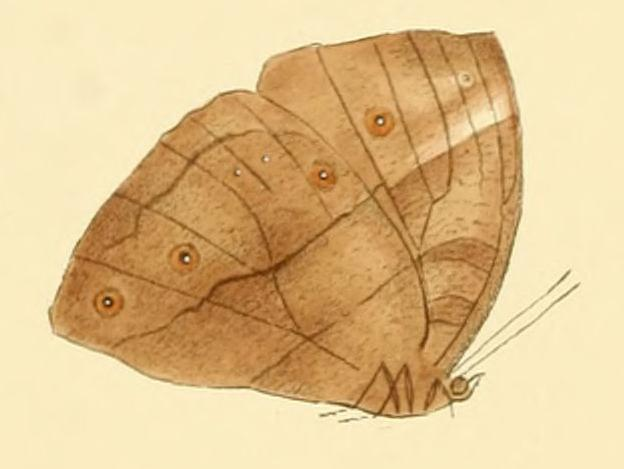

Scientific classification
- Kingdom: Animalia
- Phylum: Arthropoda
- Clade: Pancrustacea
- Class: Insecta
- Order: Lepidoptera
- Family: Nymphalidae
- Genus: Bicyclus
- Species: B. sebetus

Binomial name
- Bicyclus sebetus (Hewitson, 1877)

Synonyms
- Idomorphus sebetus Hewitson, 1877; Idiomorphus una Plötz, 1880; Mycalesis kochi Grünberg, 1910

= Bicyclus sebetus =

Species of butterfly

Bicyclus sebetus is a butterfly in the family Nymphalidae. It is found in Cameroon, Angola, the Democratic Republic of the Congo, the Central African Republic, Uganda, Burundi, western Tanzania and Zambia. The habitat consists of dense lowland forests.

Adults are attracted to the scent of fermenting bananas.
