= Bicyclus sigiussidorum =

Scientific classification
- Kingdom: Animalia
- Phylum: Arthropoda
- Clade: Pancrustacea
- Class: Insecta
- Order: Lepidoptera
- Family: Nymphalidae
- Genus: Bicyclus
- Species: B. sigiussidorum

Binomial name
- Bicyclus sigiussidorum Brattström et al., 2015

Species of butterfly

Bicyclus sigiussidorum is a butterfly in the family Nymphalidae. It is found in southern Cameroon, mainland Equatorial Guinea, and northwestern Gabon. The holotype forewing length is 23 mm.

== Etymology ==
Because of its glamorous appearance, the species was named for Ziggy Stardust, a character created by English musician David Bowie. Sigiussidorum is a Latin rendering of "Ziggy Stardust".
