= Bicyclus vansoni =

Scientific classification
- Kingdom: Animalia
- Phylum: Arthropoda
- Clade: Pancrustacea
- Class: Insecta
- Order: Lepidoptera
- Family: Nymphalidae
- Genus: Bicyclus
- Species: B. vansoni

Binomial name
- Bicyclus vansoni Condamin, 1965

Species of butterfly

Bicyclus vansoni is a butterfly in the family Nymphalidae. It is found in Angola, the Democratic Republic of the Congo, Burundi, western Tanzania, Malawi and northern Zambia. The habitat consists of Brachystegia woodland and forest margins.
