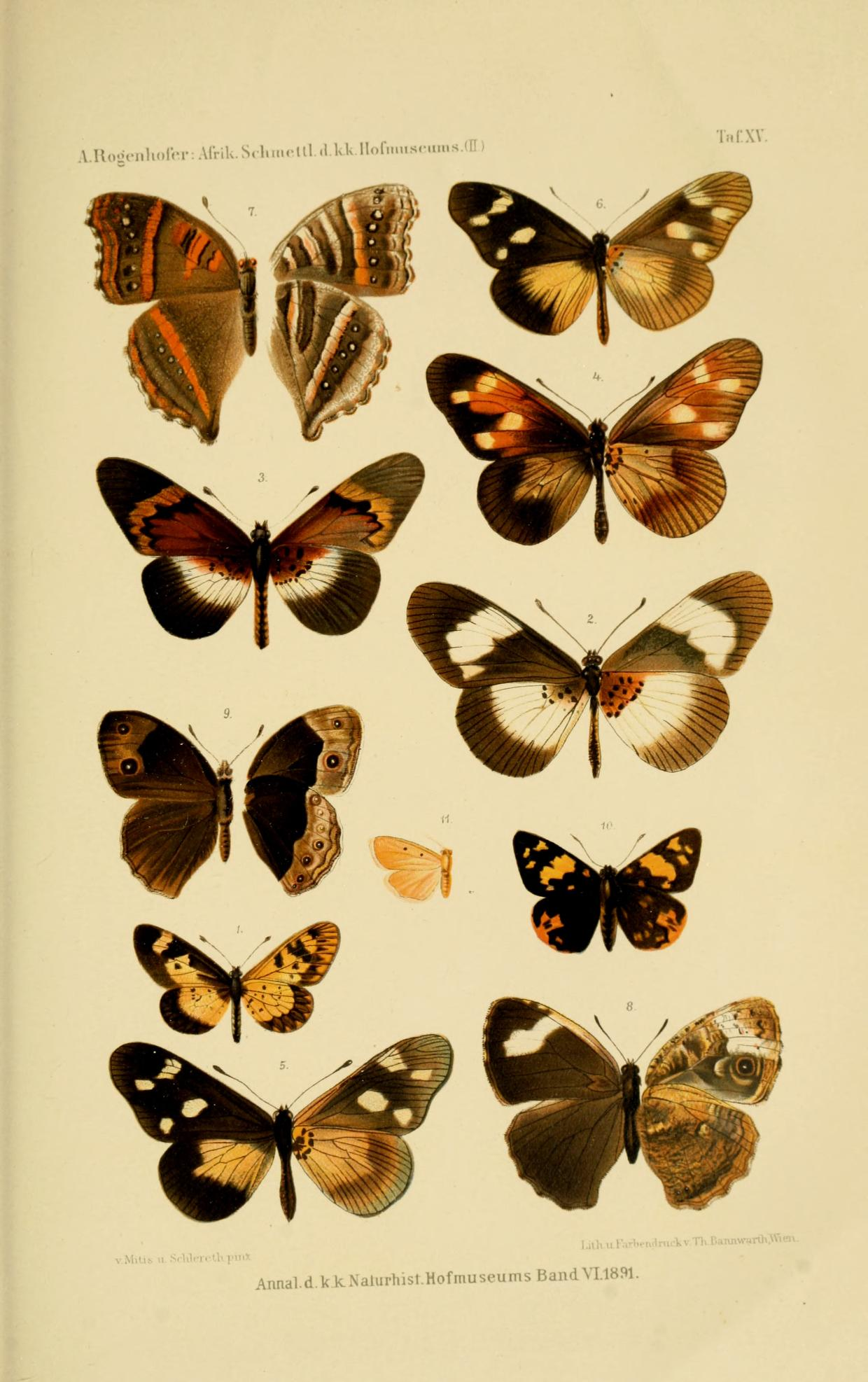
- Figure 9

Scientific classification
- Kingdom: Animalia
- Phylum: Arthropoda
- Clade: Pancrustacea
- Class: Insecta
- Order: Lepidoptera
- Family: Nymphalidae
- Genus: Bicyclus
- Species: B. danckelmani

Binomial name
- Bicyclus danckelmani (Rogenhofer, 1891)

Synonyms
- Mycalesis danckelmani Rogenhofer, 1891; Mycalesis danckelmani ab. daresa Strand, 1910; Mycalesis danckelmani ab. deannulata Strand, 1910

= Bicyclus danckelmani =

Species of butterfly

Bicyclus danckelmani is a butterfly in the family Nymphalidae. It is found in eastern Tanzania. The habitat consists of sub-montane and montane forests at altitudes between 800 and 1,800 meters.

Both sexes are attracted to fermented bananas.
