= Bicyclus abnormis =

Western white-tipped bush brown
- male in Ghana

Scientific classification
- Kingdom: Animalia
- Phylum: Arthropoda
- Clade: Pancrustacea
- Class: Insecta
- Order: Lepidoptera
- Family: Nymphalidae
- Genus: Bicyclus
- Species: B. abnormis

Binomial name
- Bicyclus abnormis (Dudgeon, 1909)

Synonyms
- Mycalesis abnormis Dudgeon, 1909

Species of butterfly

Bicyclus abnormis, the western white-tipped bush brown, is a butterfly in the family Nymphalidae. It is found in north-eastern Guinea, Sierra Leone, Ivory Coast and Ghana. The habitat consists of forests.

Torben Larsen developed a species numbering system for his 2005 publication Butterflies of West Africa. This species is #700. The 'Larsen' numbers have since been used with permission in A Sharp Eye on Butterflies of Ghana.
