= Bicyclus similis =

Scientific classification
- Kingdom: Animalia
- Phylum: Arthropoda
- Clade: Pancrustacea
- Class: Insecta
- Order: Lepidoptera
- Family: Nymphalidae
- Genus: Bicyclus
- Species: B. similis

Binomial name
- Bicyclus similis Condamin, 1963

Species of butterfly

Bicyclus similis is a butterfly in the family Nymphalidae. It is found in western Tanzania. The habitat consists of montane forests.

The larvae possibly feed on bamboo.
