= Bicyclus pavonis =

Scientific classification
- Kingdom: Animalia
- Phylum: Arthropoda
- Clade: Pancrustacea
- Class: Insecta
- Order: Lepidoptera
- Family: Nymphalidae
- Genus: Bicyclus
- Species: B. pavonis

Binomial name
- Bicyclus pavonis (Butler, 1876)

Synonyms
- Mycalesis pavonis Butler, 1876

Species of butterfly

Bicyclus pavonis, the rock bush brown, is a butterfly in the family Nymphalidae. It is found in Senegal, the Gambia, Mali, Guinea, Burkina Faso, Ivory Coast, Ghana, northern Nigeria, Cameroon, the Central African Republic, southern Sudan, northern Uganda, northern Ethiopia and north-western Kenya. The habitat consists of rocky outcrops in arid savanna.

The larvae feed on Sporobolus pyramidalis.

Torben Larsen developed a species numbering system for his 2005 publication Butterflies of West Africa. This species is #679. The 'Larsen' numbers have since been used with permission in A Sharp Eye on Butterflies of Ghana.
