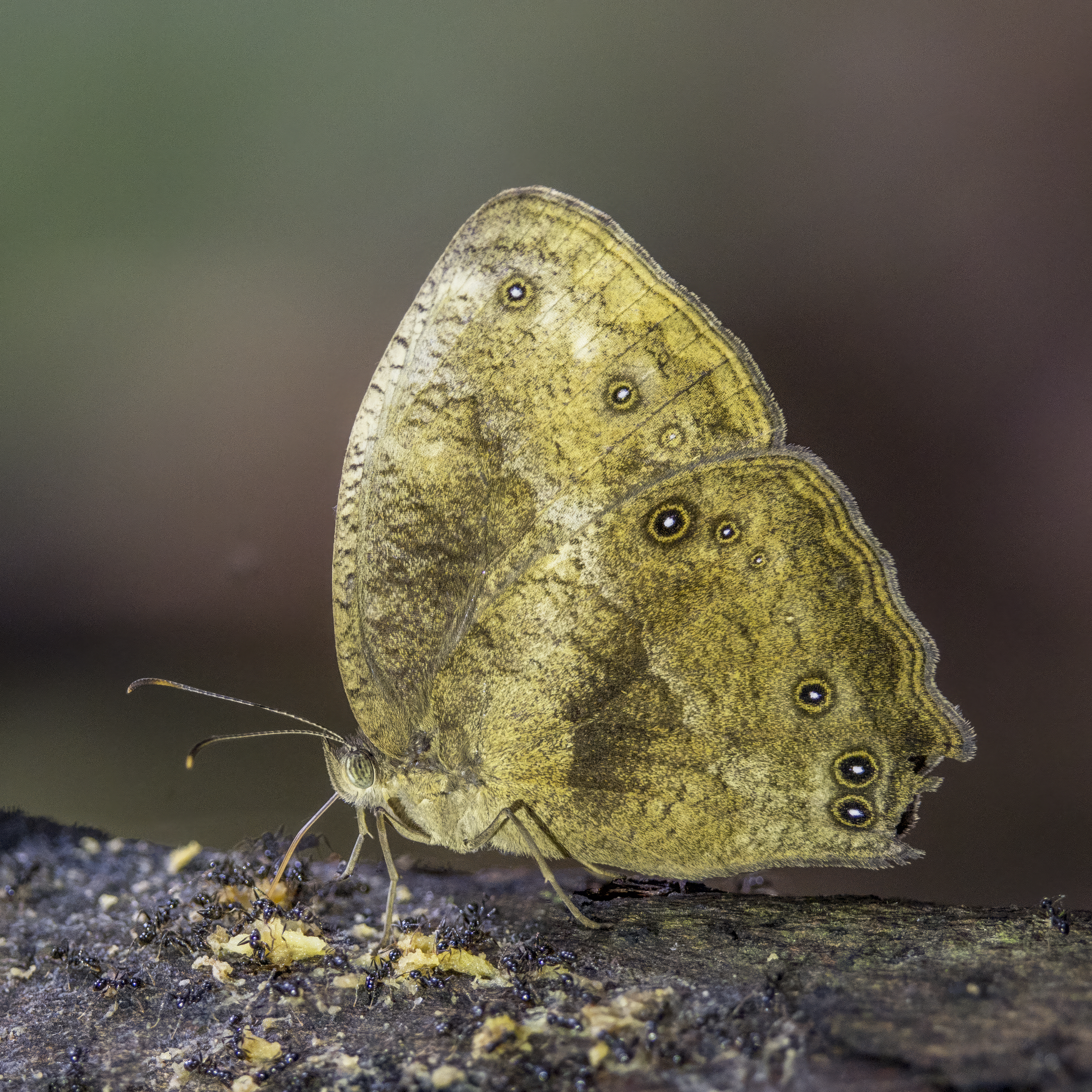
- Bicyclus sambulos unicolor, Ghana
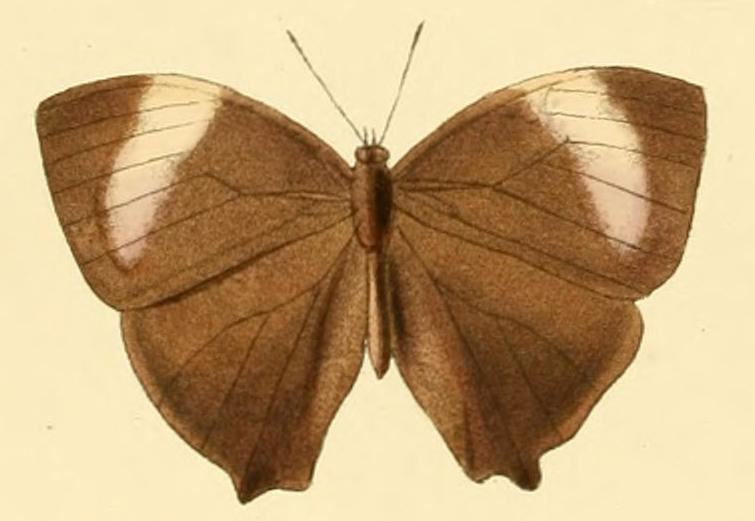

Scientific classification
- Kingdom: Animalia
- Phylum: Arthropoda
- Clade: Pancrustacea
- Class: Insecta
- Order: Lepidoptera
- Family: Nymphalidae
- Genus: Bicyclus
- Species: B. sambulos

Binomial name
- Bicyclus sambulos (Hewitson, 1877)

Synonyms
- Mycalesis sambulos Hewitson, 1877

= Bicyclus sambulos =

Tailed bush brown

Species of butterfly

Bicyclus sambulos, the tailed bush brown, is a butterfly in the family Nymphalidae. It is found in Sierra Leone, Liberia, Ivory Coast, Ghana, Nigeria, Cameroon, Gabon, the Central African Republic, the Democratic Republic of the Congo, Uganda and Tanzania. The habitat consists of dense primary forests.

Adults are attracted to fermented bananas and sap oozing from trees.

== Subspecies ==
- B. sambulos sambulos (Nigeria, Cameroon, Gabon, Central African Republic, Democratic Republic of the Congo, western Tanzania at altitudes from 800 to 1400 m)
- B. sambulos cyaneus Condamin, 1961 (Uganda, north-western Tanzania)
- B. sambulos unicolor Condamin, 1971 (Sierra Leone, Liberia, Ivory Coast, Ghana)

Torben Larsen developed a species numbering system for his 2005 publication Butterflies of West Africa. The subspecies unicolor is #693. The 'Larsen' numbers have since been used with permission in A Sharp Eye on Butterflies of Ghana.
