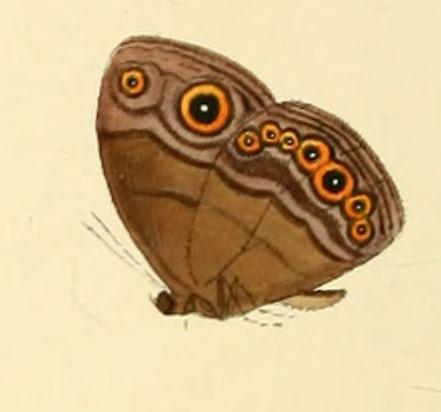

Scientific classification
- Kingdom: Animalia
- Phylum: Arthropoda
- Clade: Pancrustacea
- Class: Insecta
- Order: Lepidoptera
- Family: Nymphalidae
- Genus: Bicyclus
- Species: B. technatis

Binomial name
- Bicyclus technatis (Hewitson, 1877)

Synonyms
- Mycalesis technatis Hewitson, 1877

= Bicyclus technatis =

Technatis bush brown

Species of butterfly

Bicyclus technatis, the technatis bush brown, is a butterfly in the family Nymphalidae. It is found in Nigeria, Cameroon, Gabon, the Republic of the Congo, the Democratic Republic of the Congo and northern Angola. The habitat consists of deep forests.
