= Bicyclus elishiae =

Scientific classification
- Kingdom: Animalia
- Phylum: Arthropoda
- Clade: Pancrustacea
- Class: Insecta
- Order: Lepidoptera
- Family: Nymphalidae
- Genus: Bicyclus
- Species: B. elishiae

Binomial name
- Bicyclus elishiae Brattström et al., 2015

Species of butterfly

Bicyclus elishiae is a butterfly in the family Nymphalidae. It is found in Gabon, southeastern Cameroon and the southwestern parts of the Republic of Congo.
