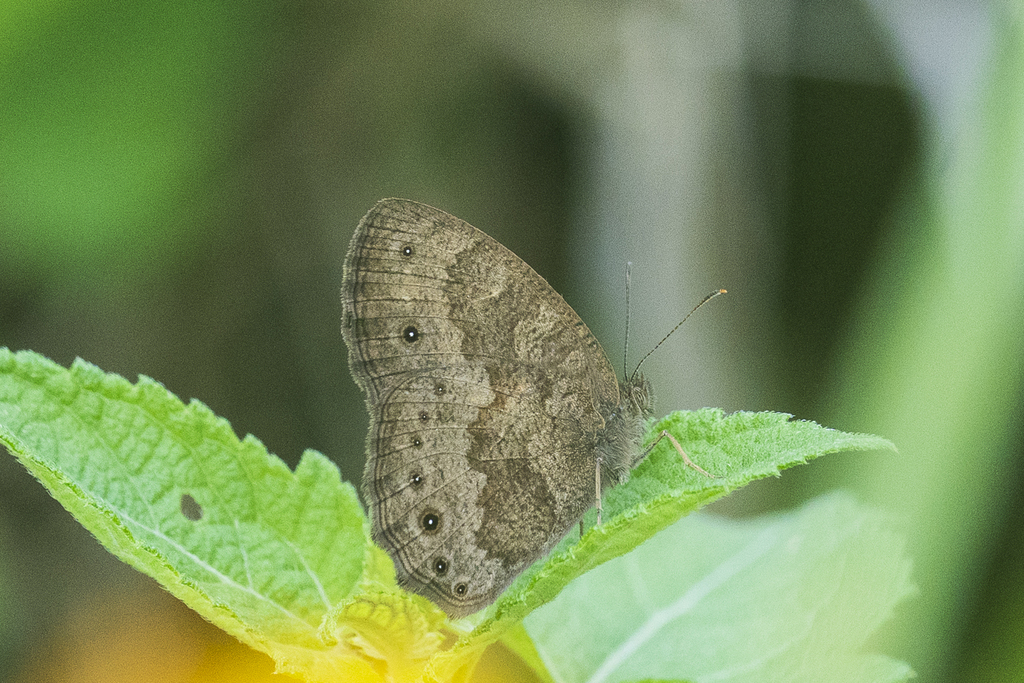

Scientific classification
- Kingdom: Animalia
- Phylum: Arthropoda
- Clade: Pancrustacea
- Class: Insecta
- Order: Lepidoptera
- Family: Nymphalidae
- Genus: Bicyclus
- Species: B. jefferyi

Binomial name
- Bicyclus jefferyi Fox, 1963

Synonyms
- Mycalesis miriam f. punctifera Strand, 1909; Mycalesis miriam miriam ab. addenda Dufrane, 1945

= Bicyclus jefferyi =

Jeffrey's bush brown

Species of butterfly

Bicyclus jefferyi, or Jeffrey's bush brown, is a butterfly in the family Nymphalidae. It is found in the Democratic Republic of the Congo, Uganda, Rwanda, Burundi, western Tanzania, Kenya (west of the Rift Valley) and northern Zambia. The habitat consists of meadows or clearings inside or near semi-montane forests.
