= Bicyclus dorothea =

Light bush brown
- male in Ghana

Scientific classification
- Kingdom: Animalia
- Phylum: Arthropoda
- Clade: Pancrustacea
- Class: Insecta
- Order: Lepidoptera
- Family: Nymphalidae
- Genus: Bicyclus
- Species: B. dorothea

Binomial name
- Bicyclus dorothea (Cramer, 1779)

Synonyms
- Papilio dorothea Cramer, 1779; Papilio melusina Fabricius, 1787; Papilio miriam Fabricius, 1793; Mycalesis raesaces Hewitson, 1866

Species of butterfly

Bicyclus dorothea, the light bush brown, is a butterfly in the family Nymphalidae. It is found in Guinea-Bissau, Guinea, Sierra Leone, Liberia, Ivory Coast, Ghana, Togo, Nigeria, Cameroon, Equatorial Guinea, São Tomé and Príncipe, the Central African Republic, Angola and the Democratic Republic of the Congo. The habitat consists of disturbed areas and clearings in forests.

The larvae feed on Paspalum conjugatum, Paspalum polystachium and Axonopus compressus.

== Subspecies ==
- Bicyclus dorothea dorothea (Guinea-Bissau, Guinea, Sierra Leone, Liberia, Ivory Coast, Ghana, Togo, Nigeria, Cameroon, Equatorial Guinea, Angola, western Democratic Republic of the Congo)
- Bicyclus dorothea concolor Condamin & Fox, 1964 (Equatorial Guinea: Bioko, São Tomé and Príncipe: São Tomé)

Torben Larsen developed a species numbering system for his 2005 publication Butterflies of West Africa. The nominate subspecies is #691. The 'Larsen' numbers have since been used with permission in A Sharp Eye on Butterflies of Ghana.
