= Bicyclus anisops =

Red-ringed bush brown

Scientific classification
- Kingdom: Animalia
- Phylum: Arthropoda
- Clade: Pancrustacea
- Class: Insecta
- Order: Lepidoptera
- Family: Nymphalidae
- Genus: Bicyclus
- Species: B. anisops

Binomial name
- Bicyclus anisops (Karsch, 1892)

Synonyms
- Mycalesis anisops Karsch, 1892; Mycalesis anisops ab. albopupillata Strand, 1913

Species of butterfly

Bicyclus anisops, the red-ringed bush brown, is a butterfly in the family Nymphalidae. It is found in eastern Nigeria and western Cameroon. The habitat consists of submontane forests above 1,300 meters (4300 feet).
