= Bematistes indentata =

- Bematistes indentata and related species

Scientific classification
- Kingdom: Animalia
- Phylum: Arthropoda
- Clade: Pancrustacea
- Class: Insecta
- Order: Lepidoptera
- Family: Nymphalidae
- Genus: Bematistes
- Species: B. indentata

Binomial name
- Bematistes indentata (Butler, 1895)

Synonyms
- Planema indentata Butler, 1895; Acraea indentata (Butler, 1895); Acraea (Acraea) indentata

Species of butterfly

Bematistes indentata is a species of butterfly in the family Nymphalidae. It is found in Cameroon.

== Description ==
P. identata Btlr. (59 e) is similar to P. excisa. male: transverse band of the forewing narrower than in excisa; hindwing above similar to that of macaria, but lighter, with broad, light yellowish to light brown median band. female: transverse band of the forewing white; median band of the hindwing white or slightly yellowish, narrower than in excisa female, distinct also beneath and basally very sharply defined, narrower than the dark distal margin. Cameroons to Angola.

== Taxonomy ==
See Pierre & Bernaud, 2014
