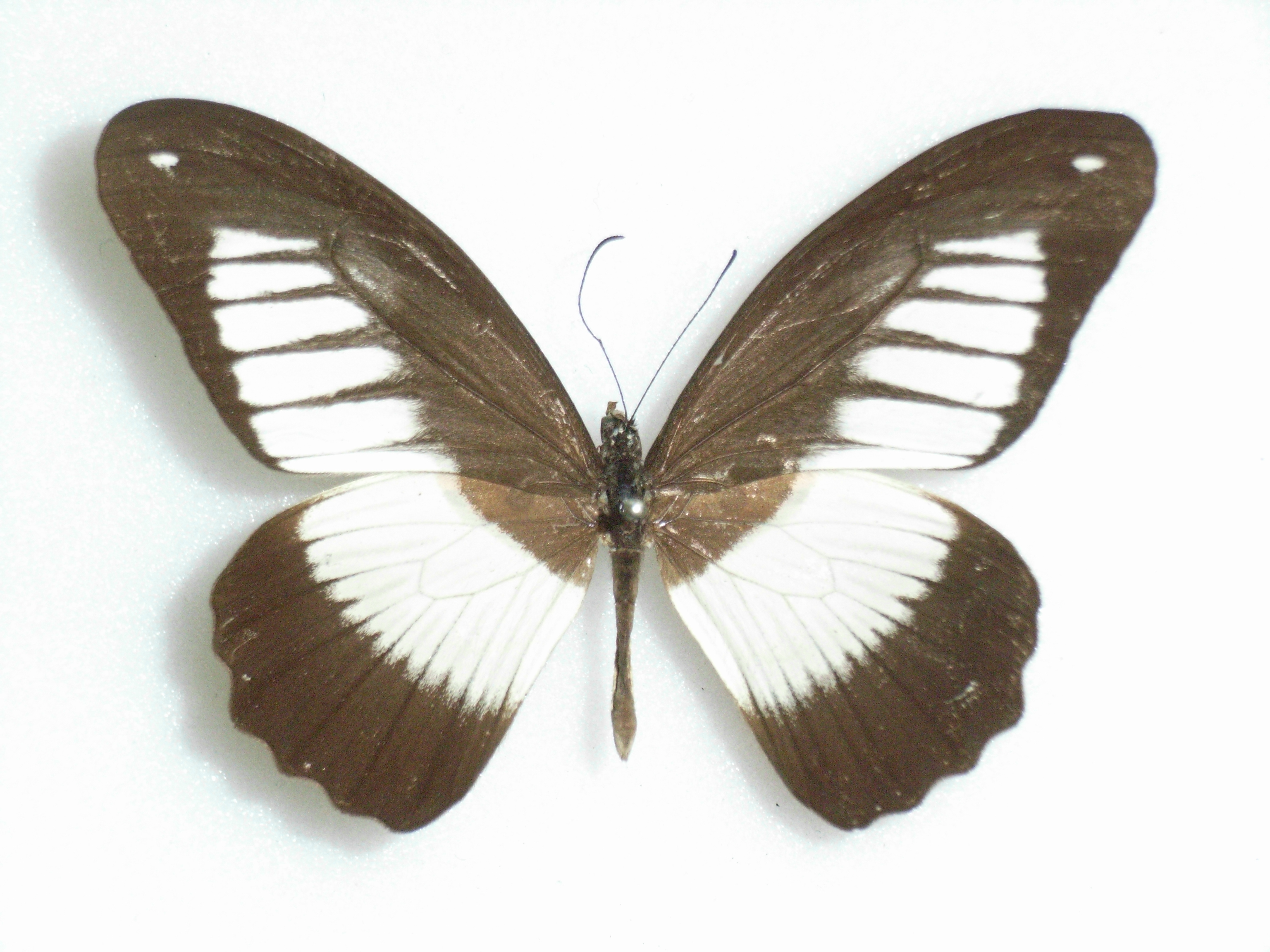

Scientific classification
- Kingdom: Animalia
- Phylum: Arthropoda
- Clade: Pancrustacea
- Class: Insecta
- Order: Lepidoptera
- Family: Papilionidae
- Genus: Papilio
- Species: P. plagiatus

Binomial name
- Papilio plagiatus Aurivillius, 1898

= Papilio plagiatus =

Species of butterfly

Papilio plagiatus, the mountain mimetic swallowtail, is a butterfly of the family Papilionidae. It is found in the forests of Nigeria, Cameroon, the Central African Republic, southern Sudan, the Republic of the Congo, Uganda and the northern part of the Democratic Republic of the Congo. The habitat mainly consists of submontane forests but adults may also be found flying in lowland forests.

== Description ==
Papilio plagiatus looks very similar to Papilio cynorta, but the male has pure white discal bands, with no traces of ivory, and the female's patterns are a bit different.

There is a clear sexual dimorphism. On the obverse, the wings of the male are black or dark brown. The forewings bear a wide white band crossed by dark veins and a white macula at the apex. The hindwings bear a white disc band. On the reverse the wings are a little lighter. The forewings bear the same patterns. The hindwings have black veins and black lines between the veins, the base is orange with two black dots, the dical white band has more blurred contours and is crossed by black veins.

The female mimics species of the genus Acraea, such as Acraea macaria and Acraea alcinoe . On the obverse the wings are dark brown. The forewings bear a large white macula and a series of very small submarginal white macules. The hind wings are dark brown at the base and in the margin and cream in the discal part. They have well marked black veins as well as black lines between the veins. On the reverse the wings are lighter. The forewings bear the same motifs as on the obverse. The hindwings have similar patterns to those of the obverse but the base is distinctly orange and bears two black dots 1, 2 .

In both sexes the body is black and the thorax bears white macules.

== Taxonomy ==
Papilio plagiatus is a member of the cynorta species group. The members of the clade are:

- Papilio arnoldiana Vane-Wright, 1995
- Papilio cynorta Fabricius, 1793
- Papilio plagiatus Aurivillius, 1898
