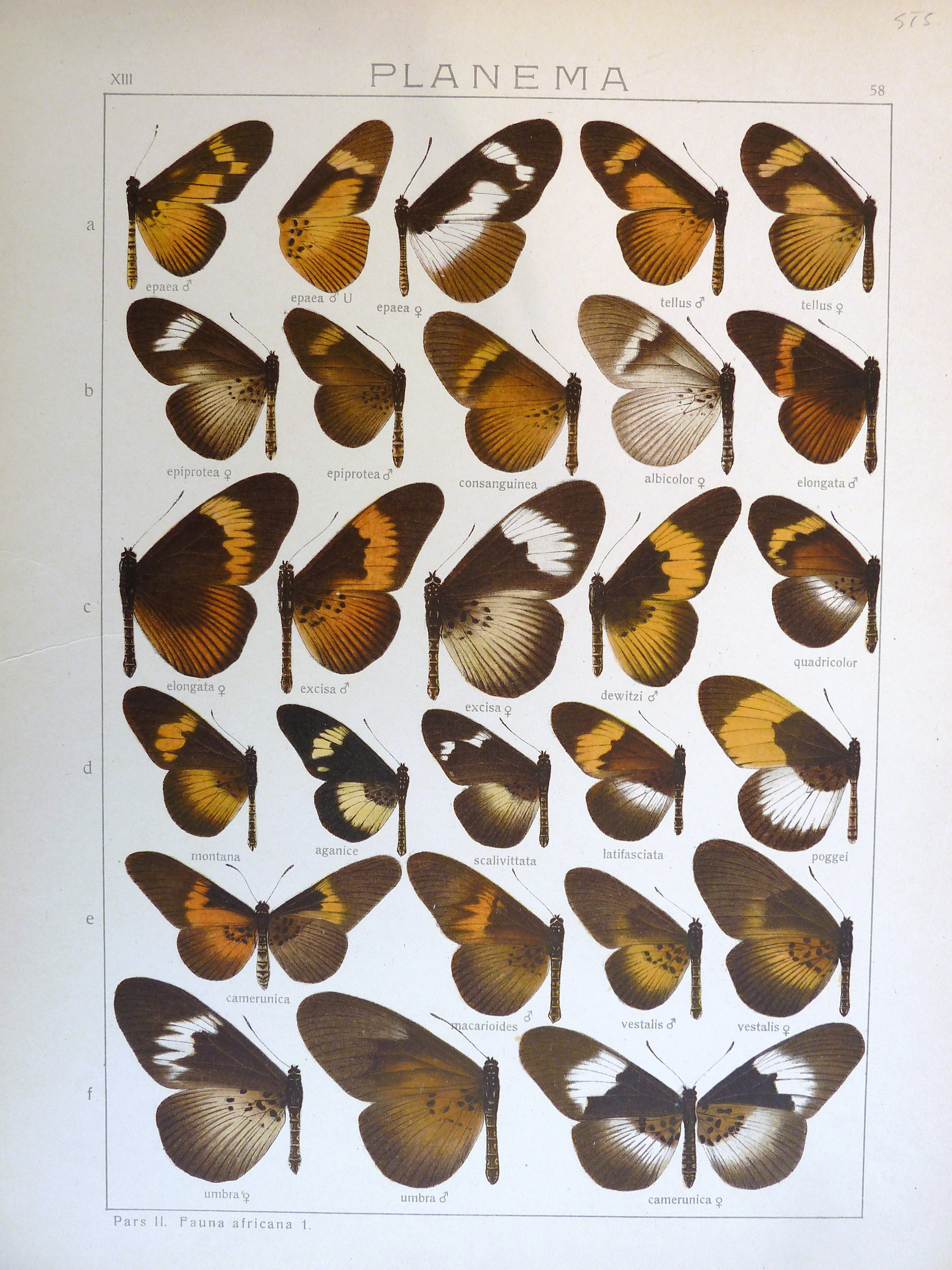
- Illustration in Adalbert Seitz's Fauna Africana

Scientific classification
- Kingdom: Animalia
- Phylum: Arthropoda
- Clade: Pancrustacea
- Class: Insecta
- Order: Lepidoptera
- Family: Nymphalidae
- Genus: Bematistes
- Species: B. scalivittata

Binomial name
- Bematistes scalivittata (Butler, 1896)

Synonyms
- Planema scalivittata Butler, 1896; Acraea scalivittata (Butler, 1896); Acraea (Acraea) scalivittata; Acraea scalivittata kiellandi Collins, 1990; Bematistes scalivittata kiellandi Collins, 1990

= Bematistes scalivittata =

Species of butterfly

Bematistes scalivittata is a species of butterfly in the family Nymphalidae, belonging to the genus Bematistes, which is sometimes treated as a subgenus of Acraea. The species was first described by Arthur Gardiner Butler in 1896 from specimens collected in Nyasaland (present-day Malawi). It is found in Tanzania, Malawi, and Zambia, where it inhabits montane forests.

== Description ==
Bematistes scalivittata closely resembles B. aganice but is distinguished by the structure of the white transverse band on the forewing, which is narrow and divided into two broadly separated parts. The costal portion, positioned at the middle of the costal margin, consists of five small spots in cellules 4–6, 10, and 11. The posterior portion comprises only two spots, in cellules 2 and 3, oriented perpendicular to the hind margin and located just 2–4 mm from the distal margin. The two parts of the transverse band are separated by approximately 3 mm at vein 4.

== Biology ==
The habitat of B. scalivittata consists of montane forests in southeastern Africa. The larvae feed on plants of the genus Adenia, including A. stolzii. Larval host plants in the genus Adenia (Passifloraceae) are shared with several other Bematistes species, including the closely related B. aganice, whose larvae also feed on Adenia species.

== Subspecies ==
Two subspecies are recognised:

- Bematistes scalivittata scalivittata – eastern Zambia, northern Malawi, and possibly western Tanzania
- Bematistes scalivittata kiellandianus Koçak, 1996 – central, southern, and south-western Tanzania

The subspecies kiellandianus was originally described as Acraea scalivittata kiellandi by Collins in 1990, but the name was preoccupied. Koçak provided the replacement name kiellandianus in 1996.

== Taxonomy ==
Butler originally described the species as Planema scalivittata in 1896. It has subsequently been placed in Acraea and, in more recent classifications, in Bematistes. The species is assigned to the umbra species group within the genus. For a detailed synonymic treatment, see Pierre & Bernaud, 2014.
