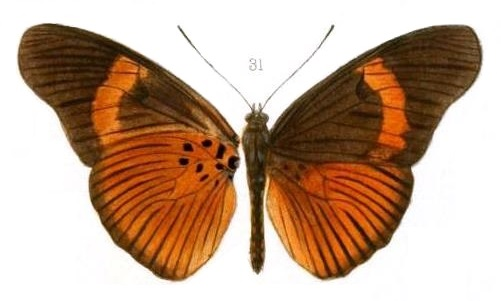
- Illustration of a male from the Ogooué River, tropical Africa

Scientific classification
- Kingdom: Animalia
- Phylum: Arthropoda
- Class: Insecta
- Order: Lepidoptera
- Family: Nymphalidae
- Genus: Pseudacraea
- Species: P. kuenowii

Binomial name
- Pseudacraea kuenowii Dewitz, 1879

Synonyms
- Pseudacraea gazengeli Oberthür, 1893; Pseudacraea kuenowi ab. ochreofasciata Schultze, 1920; Pseudacraea kunowi gottbergi f. overlaeti Berger, 1981; Pseudacraea kunowi kunowi f. oremansi Hecq, 1992; Pseudacraea gottbergi burgessi Jackson, 1951; Pseudacraea gottbergi burgessi f. albifascia Jackson, 1951; Pseudacraea gottbergi Dewitz, 1884; Pseudacraea kuenowi ab. neumanni Thurau, 1904

= Pseudacraea kuenowii =

Kuenow's false acraea

Species of butterfly

Pseudacraea kuenowii, or Kuenow's false acraea, is a butterfly in the family Nymphalidae. It is found in Nigeria, Cameroon, Gabon, the Republic of the Congo, Angola, the Democratic Republic of the Congo, Kenya, Uganda and Zambia.

== Description ==
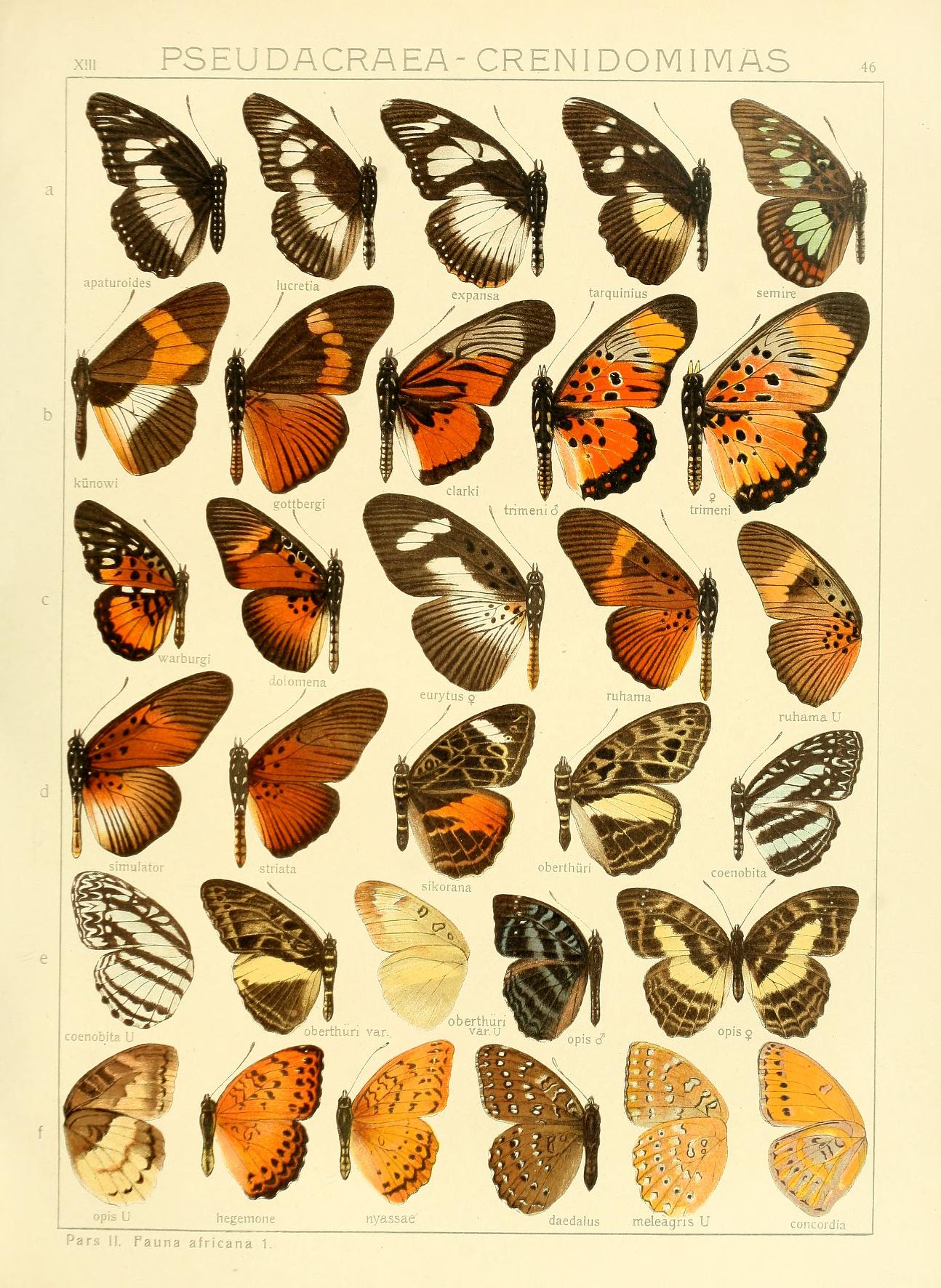
Seitz Fauna Africana Taf.46

Ps. kuenowi strongly recalls Ps. hobleyi in the orange transverse band of the forewing and the white median hand of the hindwing, but has in the basal part of the forewing instead of the black dots a thick black longitudinal streak in the cell and in 1 b.

- kuenowi Dew. (46 b). The orange transverse band of the forewing of almost uniform breadth between the costal margin and vein 3, its spot in cellule 1 b much shorter than that in cellule 2; the white median band of the hindwing is narrow, with an almost uniform breadth of 5–6 mm., and only reaches vein 1 b, cellules 1 a and 1 b being light yellowish nearly to the base. Congo, rare; mimics Planema poggei (58 d).
- neumanni Thurau (= hypoxantha Jord.) only differs in having the orange median band of the forewing somewhat broader, distinctly wider at the costal margin than at vein 4, the spot in cellule 1 b as long as that in 2, while the white median band of the hindwing reaches the inner margin, towards which it is distinctly widened; the inner margin is only yellowish between the white band and the anal angle. Uganda. Ps. gottbergi Dew. (46 b) has on the forewing a narrow, somewhat curved transverse band of almost uniform breadth, which reaches the hindmargin near the hinder angle, is composed of nearly quadrate spots and has a spot also in the apex of the cell. The hindwing is dark red-brown with black streaks and narrow black marginal band. The forewing on both surfaces with a thick black longitudinal streak in the cell and in cellules 1 b and 2. This rare species is coloured and marked almost exactly like Ps. ruhama (46 c) and Planema elongata (58 b, c). Cameroons to the southern Congo region.

== Subspecies ==
- Pseudacraea kuenowii kuenowii — southern and eastern Democratic Republic of the Congo, Zambia
- Pseudacraea kuenowii burgessi Jackson, 1951 — Uganda: slopes of Mount Elgon, Kenya: slopes of Mount Elgon
- Pseudacraea kuenowii gottbergi Dewitz, 1884 — Nigeria, Cameroon, Gabon, Congo, Angola, western Democratic Republic of the Congo
- Pseudacraea kuenowii hypoxantha Jordan, 1911 — Uganda
- Pseudacraea kuenowii kigezi Jackson, 1956 — Uganda: west to the Kigezi and Ankole districts

== Biology ==
The habitat consists of forests.

Adults mimic Acraea elongata.
