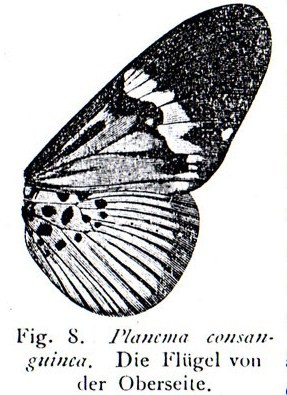

Scientific classification
- Kingdom: Animalia
- Phylum: Arthropoda
- Clade: Pancrustacea
- Class: Insecta
- Order: Lepidoptera
- Family: Nymphalidae
- Genus: Bematistes
- Species: B. consanguinea

Binomial name
- Bematistes consanguinea (Aurivillius, 1893)

Synonyms
- Acraea consanguinea (Aurivillius, 1893); Planema consanguinea Aurivillius, 1893; Acraea (Acraea) consanguinea; Planema consanguinea f. inaequalis Le Doux, 1931; Planema albicolor Karsch, 1895; Planema arenaria Sharpe, 1902; Planema consanguinea albicolor f. flava Le Doux, 1931; Planema consanguinea var. intermedia Aurivillius, 1899; Planema consanguinea f. conspicua Le Doux, 1937; Planema consanguinea f. peregrina Le Doux, 1937; Planema consanguinea sartina Jordan, 1910

= Bematistes consanguinea =

Species of butterfly

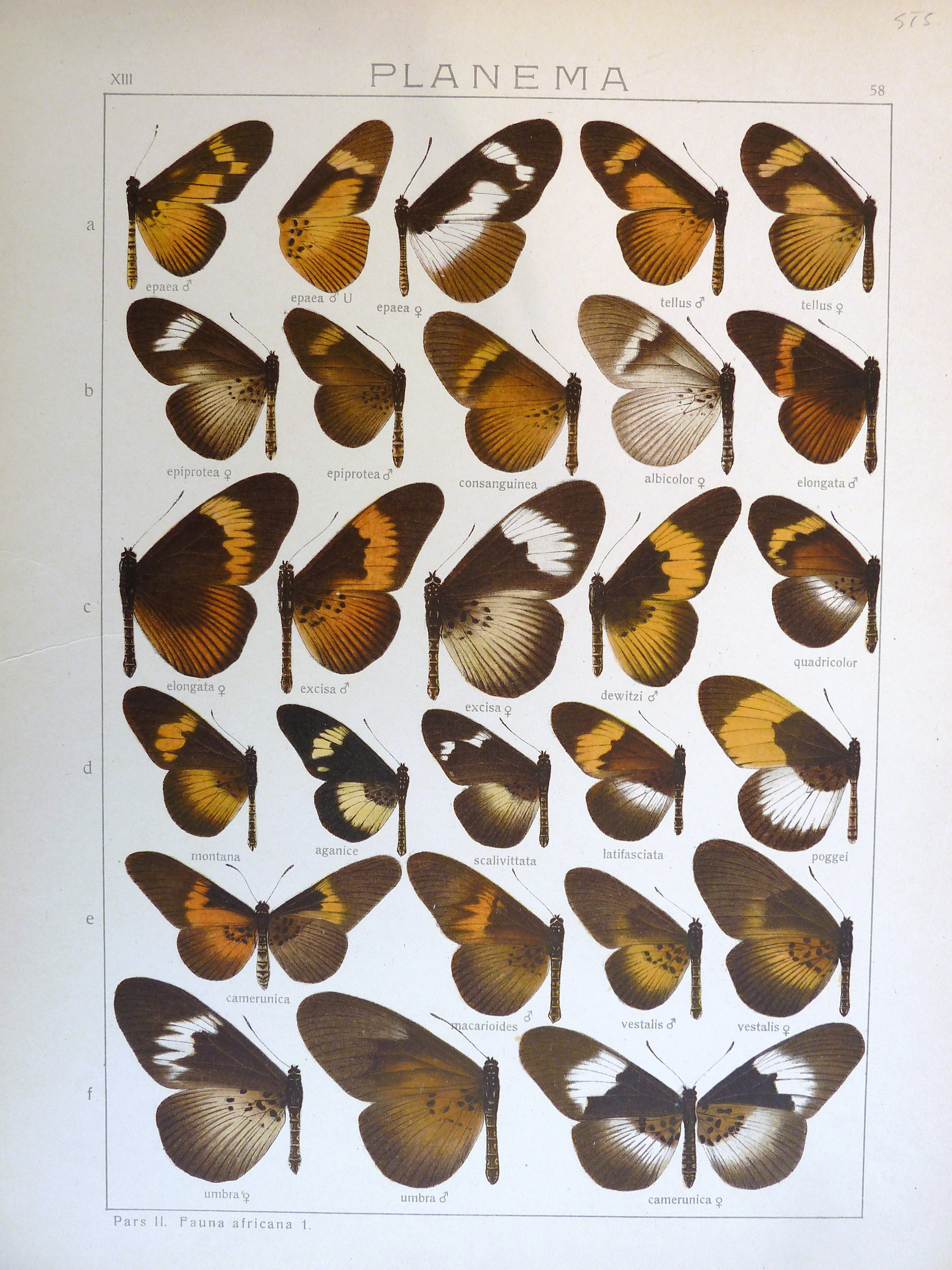
In Adalbert Seitz's Fauna Africana

Bematistes consanguinea, the blood-brother bematistes, is a species of butterfly in the family Nymphalidae. It is found in Sierra Leone, Liberia, Ivory Coast, Ghana, Nigeria, Cameroon, Gabon, the Republic of the Congo, Angola, the Democratic Republic of the Congo, Uganda, Tanzania and Zambia.

== Description ==
P. consanguinea differs from the preceding [Bematistes elongata ]in having the basal part of the forewing above more or less light and the light transverse band more obliquely placed, narrowed or indistinct behind vein 2 and separated from the light basal part by a dark transverse band of the ground-colour, while the upperside of the hindwing is not darkened at the base. The black streaks on the hindwing are long and reach at least the middle. The marginal band on the upperside of the hindwing is sharply defined and is formed nearly as in elongata. - consanguinea Auriv. (58 b). The basal part of the forewing above as far as vein 3 chestnut-brown with or without longitudinal streak in the cell; the transverse band and the upper surface of the hindwing yellow- brown; the under surface of the hindwing yellowish grey, at the base more or less red-brown. The female is larger and lighter and has the transverse band of the forewing broader and light yellow. Niger to the Congo, ab. intermedia Auriv. only differs in having the whole of the cell of the forewing black. Congo. - sartina Jord. seems to be the north-western race. Only the female is yet known; it differs from that of the type-form in having the transverse band of the forewing as dark as in the male and placed nearer to the base, the marginal band of the hindwing is broader and the ground-colour lighter; on the under surface the base is darker brown and the ground-colour lighter. Gold Coast. - In albicolor Karsch (= arenaria E. Sharpe) (57 e, 58 b) the transverse band of the forewing is white and the parts of the upper surface which in the type-form are red-brown to yellow-brown are dirty sand-yellow (male) or white (female); the under surface of the hindwing is light grey to white as far as the base. Uganda.

== Subspecies ==
- B. c. consanguinea (Nigeria, Cameroon, Gabon)
- B. c. albicolor (Karsch, 1895) (south-eastern Uganda, north-western Tanzania)
- B. c. intermedia (Aurivillius, 1899) (Congo, Democratic Republic of the Congo, Angola, Zambia)

== Biology ==
- B. c. sartina (Jordan, 1910) (Sierra Leone, Liberia, Ivory Coast, Ghana)

The habitat consists of forests.

The larvae feed on Barteria nigritiana.

== Taxonomy ==
See Pierre & Bernaud, 2014
