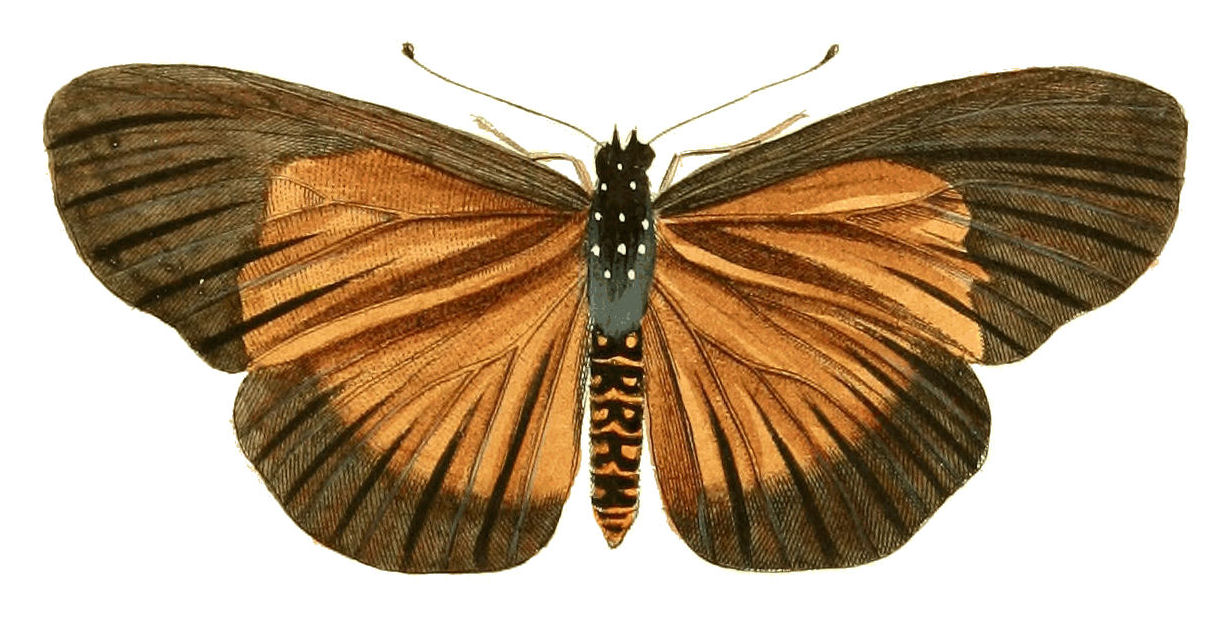
- Illustration by Dru Drury

Scientific classification
- Kingdom: Animalia
- Phylum: Arthropoda
- Clade: Pancrustacea
- Class: Insecta
- Order: Lepidoptera
- Family: Nymphalidae
- Genus: Bematistes
- Species: B. umbra

Binomial name
- Bematistes umbra (Drury, [1782])

Synonyms
- Papilio umbra Drury, 1782; Acraea umbra (Drury, 1782); Acraea (Acraea) umbra; Planema umbra carpenteri le Doux, 1937; Planema macaria hemileuca Jordan, 1914; Planema macarioides Aurivillius, 1893; Planema umbra rabuma Suffert, 1904

= Bematistes umbra =

Species of butterfly

Bematistes umbra, the clouded bematistes, is a species of butterfly in the family Nymphalidae. It is found in Gambia, Guinea-Bissau, Sierra Leone, Liberia, Ivory Coast, Ghana, Togo, Nigeria, Cameroon, Gabon, Angola, the Democratic Republic of the Congo, Uganda, Kenya, Tanzania and Zambia.

== Description ==
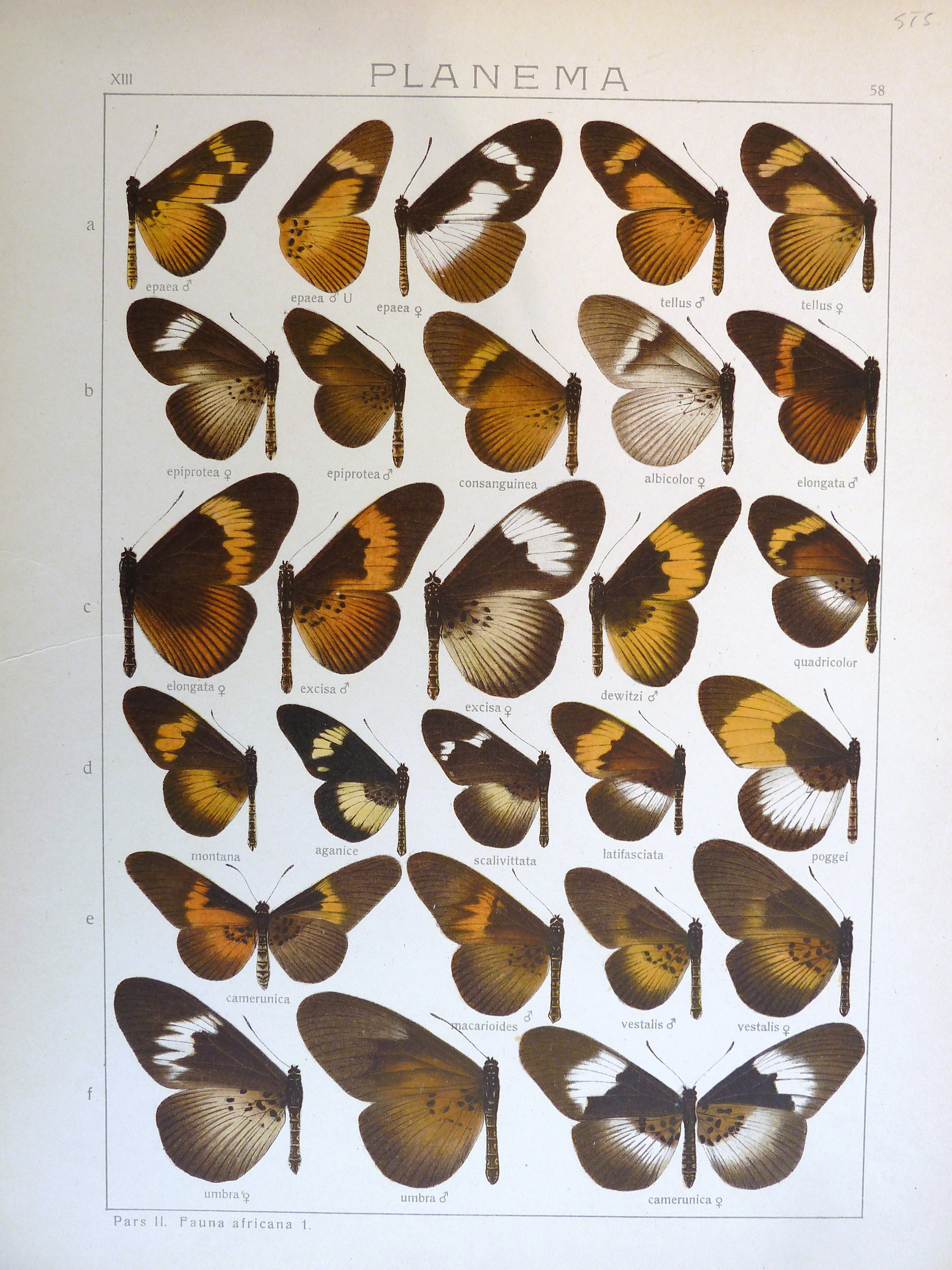
Seitz Fauna Africana Taf58

P. umbra Drury (58 f, called male but certainly a female) is a species not yet quite accurately known, which closely approximates to the preceding [ alcinoe ]. It was described by Drury from a female from Sierra Leone, in which the basal part of the forewing is dark yellow-brown and the transverse band is entirely absent; also the basal part of the hindwing is dark brown-yellow to beyond the middle with the usual black dots at the base. The female here figured as "male" thus agrees very exactly with Drury's figure and description. Another female form, fasciata ab. nov., which occurs in the Cameroons, differs in having the base of both wings still darker smoky brown, whilst the forewing bears a white transverse band, very narrow and almost broken up into spots; on the upperside this transverse band only occurs in cellules 2-6, is only about 2 mm. in breadth, forms in 2 and in 3 two free or almost free triangular spots and is placed far beyond the apex of the cell, so that the base of cellules 3-6 is broadly black; thus this female differs entirely from those of the preceding species (alcinoe). A specimen of this form was bred by Professor Sjostedt; the larva was entirely light red, somewhat inclining to violet, with black spines; the pupa is whitish with black markings and on the back of the abdomen (on segments 3-5) armed with three pairs of long, thick spines, hooked at the tips; these spines are yellow-red at the base and the two last are longer than the rest; the head bears two long, divaricating horns, distally armed with a small tooth. - A form very similar to P. alcinoe is usually regarded as the male of umbra, but differs in its larger size, the narrower or indistinct transverse band of the fore wing and the narrower dark marginal band on the upperside of the hindwing; as the transverse band of the forewing touches the apex of the cell, fills up the base of cellule 3 and has undivided spots in cellules 1 b and 2, it seems improbable that this male belongs to a female which differs in all these characters.

P. macarioides has the hindwing above dirty yellow-brown to beyond the middle without a distinct boundary-line between the somewhat darker basal part and the median band. The transverse band of the fore wing in the male is somewhat lighter and narrower than in the male of macaria.- macarioides Auriv. ( = rabuma Suff.) (57 f, 58 e and 58 f, as umbra female ) is larger and has in the male the basal part of the forewing at least in the cell blackish; the dark distal part of the hindwing above is broader and more distinctly defined. Cameroons

== Subspecies ==
- A. u. umbra (Sierra Leone, Liberia, Ivory Coast, Ghana, Togo, Nigeria, western Cameroon)
- A. u. carpenteri (Le Doux, 1937) (Gambia, Guinea-Bissau, Guinea)
- A. u. hemileuca (Jordan, 1914) (eastern Democratic Republic of the Congo, Uganda, Kenya: west to the Kakamega Forest)
- A. u. macarioides (Aurivillius, 1893) (Cameroon, Gabon, western Democratic Republic of the Congo, Angola, north-western Tanzania, Zambia)

Torben Larsen developed a species numbering system for his 2005 publication Butterflies of West Africa. The nominate subspecies is #1190. The 'Larsen' numbers have since been used with permission in A Sharp Eye on Butterflies of Ghana.

== Biology ==
The habitat consists of forests.

The larvae feed on Adenia cisampelloides.

== Taxonomy ==
See Pierre & Bernaud, 2014
