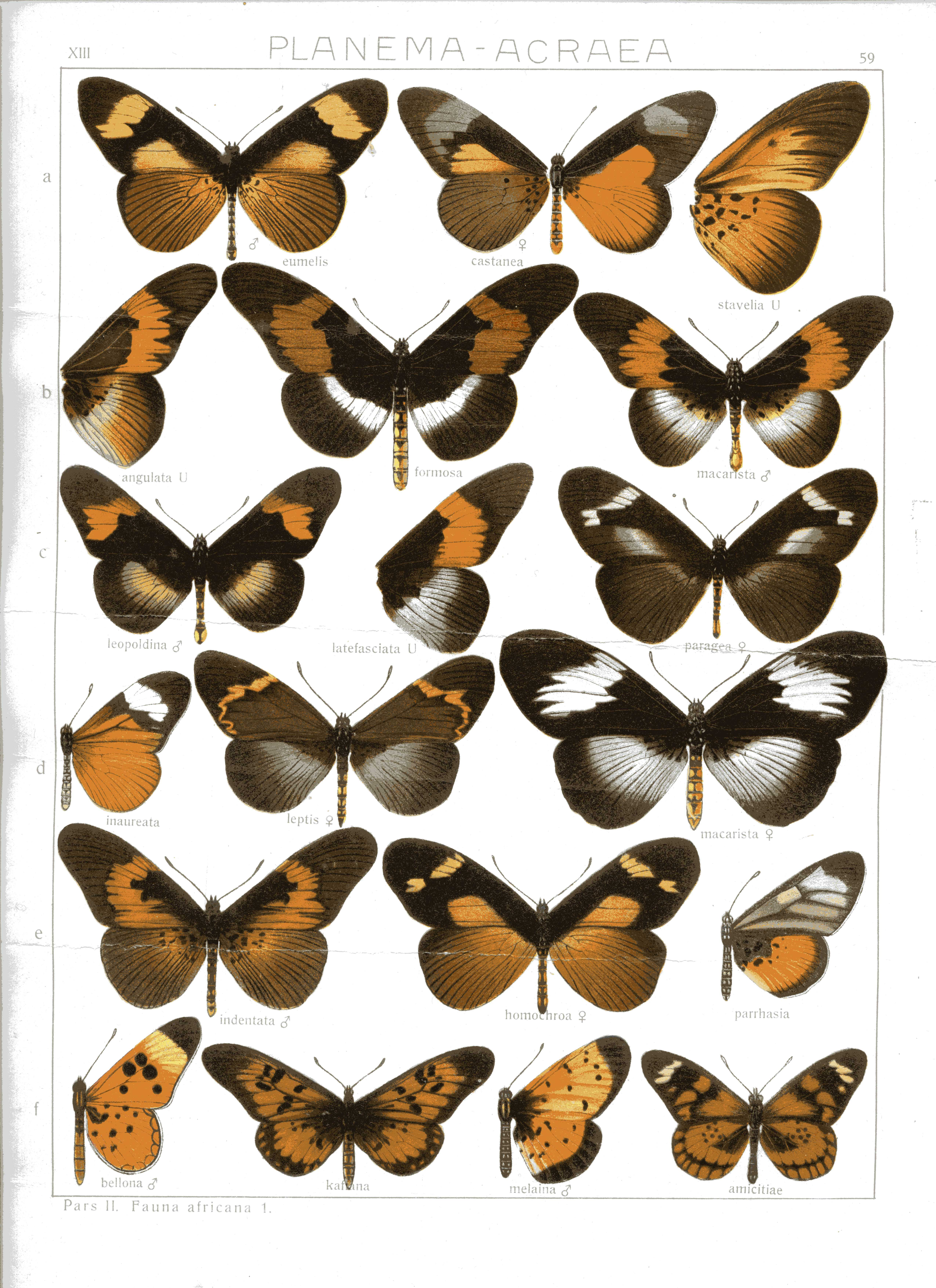
- Seitz Fauna Africana Taf59

Scientific classification
- Kingdom: Animalia
- Phylum: Arthropoda
- Clade: Pancrustacea
- Class: Insecta
- Order: Lepidoptera
- Family: Nymphalidae
- Genus: Bematistes
- Species: B. macarista

Binomial name
- Bematistes macarista (Sharpe, 1906)

Synonyms
- Planema macarista Sharpe, 1906; Acraea macarista (Sharpe, 1906); Acraea (Acraea) macarista; Planema formosa moforsa Suffert, 1904; Planema plagioscia Bethune-Baker, 1908; Planema vendita Wichgraf, 1911; Planema macarista macarista f. distincta Le Doux, 1937; Planema formosa latefasciata Suffert, 1904; Planema macarista rileyi Le Doux, 1937

= Bematistes macarista =

Species of butterfly

Bematistes macarista is a species of butterfly in the family Nymphalidae. It is found in Cameroon, Gabon, Equatorial Guinea, the Democratic Republic of the Congo, Uganda, Sudan, Kenya, Tanzania and Zambia.

== Description ==
P. macarista E. Sharpe (59 b, d). The male is similar to that of poggei, but the transverse band of the forewing is of almost uniform breadth, narrower and placed more vertically to the inner margin; in addition it does not reach the distal margin, hence the black ground-colour of the apex is continued to the hinder angle; the white median band of the hindwing is broader than in poggei male and the dark marginal band correspondingly narrower. In the female the transverse band of the forewing is white and terminates at vein 2; its spots in cellules 2 and 3 are cut off obliquely and almost straight towards the base. Cameroons to the Congo and Uganda, ab. plagioscia Baker only differs in having the transverse band of the forewing more deeply incised distally. Congo: Beni Mawambe. male-ab. latifasciata Suff. (59 c) has on the forewing a somewhat broader transverse band, which completely fills up the base of cellule 3. Cameroons. male -ab moforsa Suff. has the median band on the upperside of the hindwing brown-yellow, only white at the inner margin in cellule 1 a. Congo : Mukenge. male -ab. vendita Grünb. The median band on the upperside of the hindwing is narrower, in cellule 2 only 5 mm. in breadth, and at the costal margin yellow as far as vein 5. Sesse Islands.

== Subspecies ==
- Bematistes macarista macarista (Democratic Republic of the Congo, Uganda, Sudan, western Kenya, north-western Tanzania, north-western Zambia)
- Bematistes macarista latefasciata (Suffert, 1904) (Cameroon, Gabon, Equatorial Guinea)

== Biology ==
The habitat consists of dense forests. Both sexes of this dimorphic species are mimicked by the parallel sexes of Pseudacraea eurytus.
