= Bematistes formosa =

- Bematistes formosa and related species

Scientific classification
- Kingdom: Animalia
- Phylum: Arthropoda
- Clade: Pancrustacea
- Class: Insecta
- Order: Lepidoptera
- Family: Nymphalidae
- Genus: Bematistes
- Species: B. formosa

Binomial name
- Bematistes formosa (Butler, 1874)

Synonyms
- Planema formosa Butler, 1874; Acraea formosa (Butler, 1874); Acraea (Acraea) formosa

Species of butterfly

Bematistes formosa is a species of butterfly in the family Nymphalidae. It is found from Cameroon to the Democratic Republic of the Congo and in western Uganda.

== Description ==
P. formosa Btlr. (59 b) is a little known species very similar to the following [ Bematistes poggei ]; it differs from it in having the transverse band of the forewing narrowed towards the costal margin and with the distal side angled at vein 4, while the white median band of the hindwing is narrower; transverse band of the forewing orange- yellow in the male white in the female. Cameroon to the Congo.
