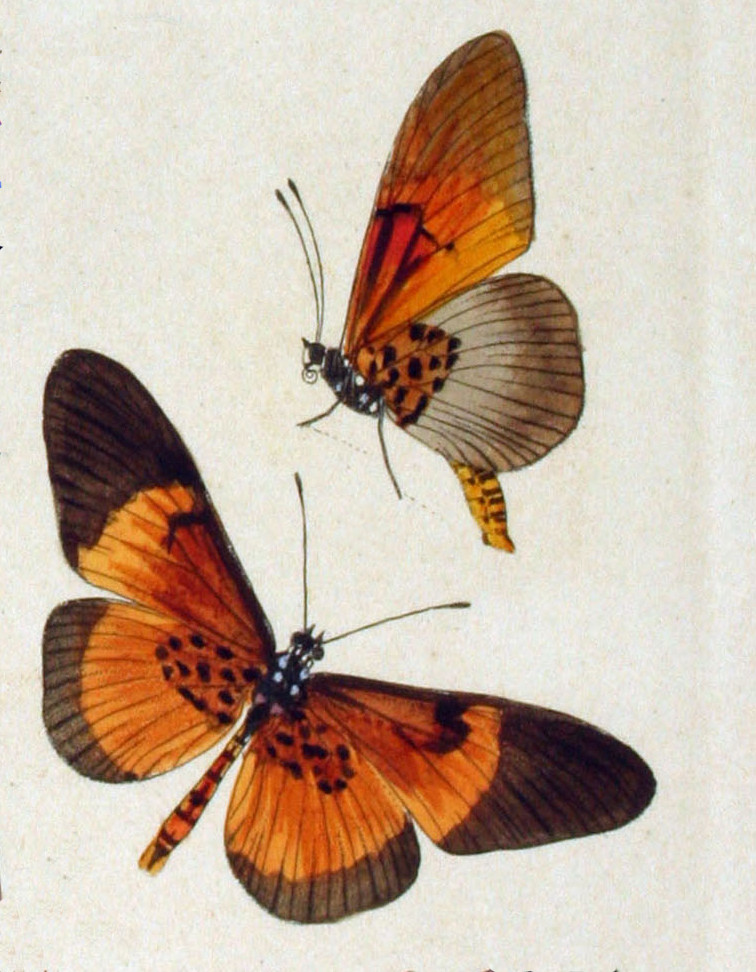

Scientific classification
- Kingdom: Animalia
- Phylum: Arthropoda
- Clade: Pancrustacea
- Class: Insecta
- Order: Lepidoptera
- Family: Nymphalidae
- Genus: Bematistes
- Species: B. alcinoe

Binomial name
- Bematistes alcinoe Weymer, 1892

Synonyms
- Acraea alcinoe Felder & Felder, 1865; Acraea (Acraea) alcinoe; Planema godmani Butler, 1895; Acraea timandra Karsch, 1893; Planema alcinoe var. camerunica Aurivillius, 1893; Planema salvini Butler, 1895; Planema nado Ungemach, 1932; Acraea alcinoe racaji

= Bematistes alcinoe =

Alcinoe bematistes

Species of butterfly

Acraea alcinoe, formerly Bematistes alcinoe, the alcinoe bematistes, is a species of butterfly in the family Nymphalidae. It is found in Guinea-Bissau, Guinea, Sierra Leone, Liberia, Ivory Coast, Ghana, Togo, Nigeria, Cameroon, Equatorial Guinea, São Tomé and Príncipe, the Democratic Republic of the Congo, Ethiopia, Uganda, Kenya, Burundi and Tanzania.

== Description ==
P. alcinoe differs from the two preceding species [ macaria and macarioides (pars) ] in having spots 1 b and 2 of the transverse band of the forewing distally rounded or cut off transversely, occasionally in the female with a narrow fissure between them; the transverse band of the forewing covers the extreme tip of the lower angle of the cell and also in the female usually the base of cellule 3; in the male the basal part of cellules 1 a and 1 b of the forewing above is brown-yellow and this colour shades into the transverse band without any dividing-line; in the female the median band of the hindwing is white and sharply defined. -alcinoe Fldr. (= godmani Btlr.) (57 f). The dark marginal band on the upperside of the hindwing is narrower, about 6 mm. in breadth, and less sharply defined proximally; in the male the cell of the forewing is entirely or for the most part yellow-brown. Sierra Leone to Gold Coast. - camerunica Auriv. (= salvini Btlr.) (58 e, f) has the dark marginal band on the upperside of the hindwing in both sexes broader, 9-11mm. in breadth, and more sharply defined proximally; in the male the cell of the fore wing above is entirely or for the most part black. - Larva unicolorous dark red with black spines and black head. Pupa light-coloured with black markings and on the upperside of the abdomen on each segment from 2–5 with a pair of very long, slender, black spines with yellow-red base and the tips curved into hooks; those of the second segment are longer than the rest and directed forwards, those of the fifth segment the shortest; the head with two divaricating horns. Sjostedt bred this form in numbers in the Cameroons and thus the identity of the sexes at least here has been definitely established; the specimens show only quite unimportant variations inter se. Niger to the southern Congo region.

== Subspecies ==
- Acraea alcinoe alcinoe (Guinea-Bissau, Guinea, Sierra Leone, Liberia, Ivory Coast, Ghana, Togo, Nigeria)
- Acraea alcinoe camerunica (Aurivillius, 1893) (Cameroon, Bioko, Democratic Republic of the Congo, Uganda, Kenya, Burundi, north-western Tanzania)
- Acraea alcinoe nado (Ungemach, 1932) (south-western Ethiopia)
- Acraea alcinoe racaji Pyrcz, 1991 (island of Príncipe)

Torben Larsen developed a species numbering system for his 2005 publication Butterflies of West Africa. The nominate subspecies is #1191. The 'Larsen' numbers have since been used with permission in A Sharp Eye on Butterflies of Ghana.

== Biology ==
The habitat consists of forests.

The larvae feed on Adenia cisampelloides.

== Taxonomy ==
Pierre & Bernau, 2also Pierre & Bernaud, 2014
