= Bematistes pseudeuryta =

- Bematistes pseudeuryta as Planema formosa angulata and related species

Scientific classification
- Kingdom: Animalia
- Phylum: Arthropoda
- Clade: Pancrustacea
- Class: Insecta
- Order: Lepidoptera
- Family: Nymphalidae
- Genus: Bematistes
- Species: B. pseudeuryta

Binomial name
- Bematistes pseudeuryta Godman & Salvin, 1890

Synonyms
- Acraea pseudeuryta Godman & Salvin, 1890; Acraea (Acraea) pseudeuryta; Acraea dewitzi Staudinger, 1896; Planema formosa angulata Suffert, 1904

Species of butterfly

Bematistes pseudeuryta is a species of butterfly in the family Nymphalidae. It is found in Angola, the Democratic Republic of the Congo, Sudan and western Uganda.

== Description ==
P. pseudeuryta Godm. & Salv. (dewitzi Stgr.) (58 c). This species has been the subject of a regrettable muddle. In describing their species Godman and Salvin expressly say that the example was designated by Dr. Staudinger pseudeuryta spec, nov.. But in Iris (vol. 9, p. 210) Staudinger writes that he obtained Acraea excisa Btlr. in rather large numbers from the Cameroons and Gaboon and formerly sent it out as Acr. pseudeuryta in litt. Consequently, in my work Rhopalocera Aethiopica I regarded P. excisa and pseudeuryta as the same species. Now, however, Dr. Jordan, who has doubtless examined the type of pseudeuryta, has discovered that pseudeuryta Godm. & Salv. is identical with dewitzi Stgr. and not with excisa. Staudinger must therefore have formerly confused dewitzi and excisa. And the males are really very similar above, as a glance at the figures (58 c) shows, but they are very easily distinguished by the basal half of the hindwing in pseudeuryta being dark brown beneath, distally bounded by a whitish median band, whilst in excisa the entire under surface has the ground-colour almost the same uniform light brown-yellow and lacks the median band. - male fore wing black-brown above with orange-yellow transverse band of almost uniform breadth, which reaches the hindmargin but scarcely the distal margin and on the proximal side is encroached upon in cellules 1 b and 3 by the dark ground-colour; the spots in cellules 1 b- 3 are triangularly incised distally. The hindwing is brown-yellow above, with narrow blackish marginal band 3–4 mm. in breadth and not sharply defined and the basal area more or less darkened; the under surface of the hindwing has a dark brown basal area and a whitish median band, 5–7 mm. in breadth, which becomes gradually narrower towards the costal margin. The under surface of the forewing only differs from the upper in the lighter and duller transverse band. The female is unknown to me. Congo and Angola. - angulata Suff. (59 b) seems from the description only to differ from pseudeuryta in having the marginal band on the upperside of the hindwing narrower at the anal angle and the median band whitish in the middle and perhaps belongs rather to macarista. Southern Congo region near Mukenge.

== Taxonomy ==
See Pierre & Bernaud, 2014
