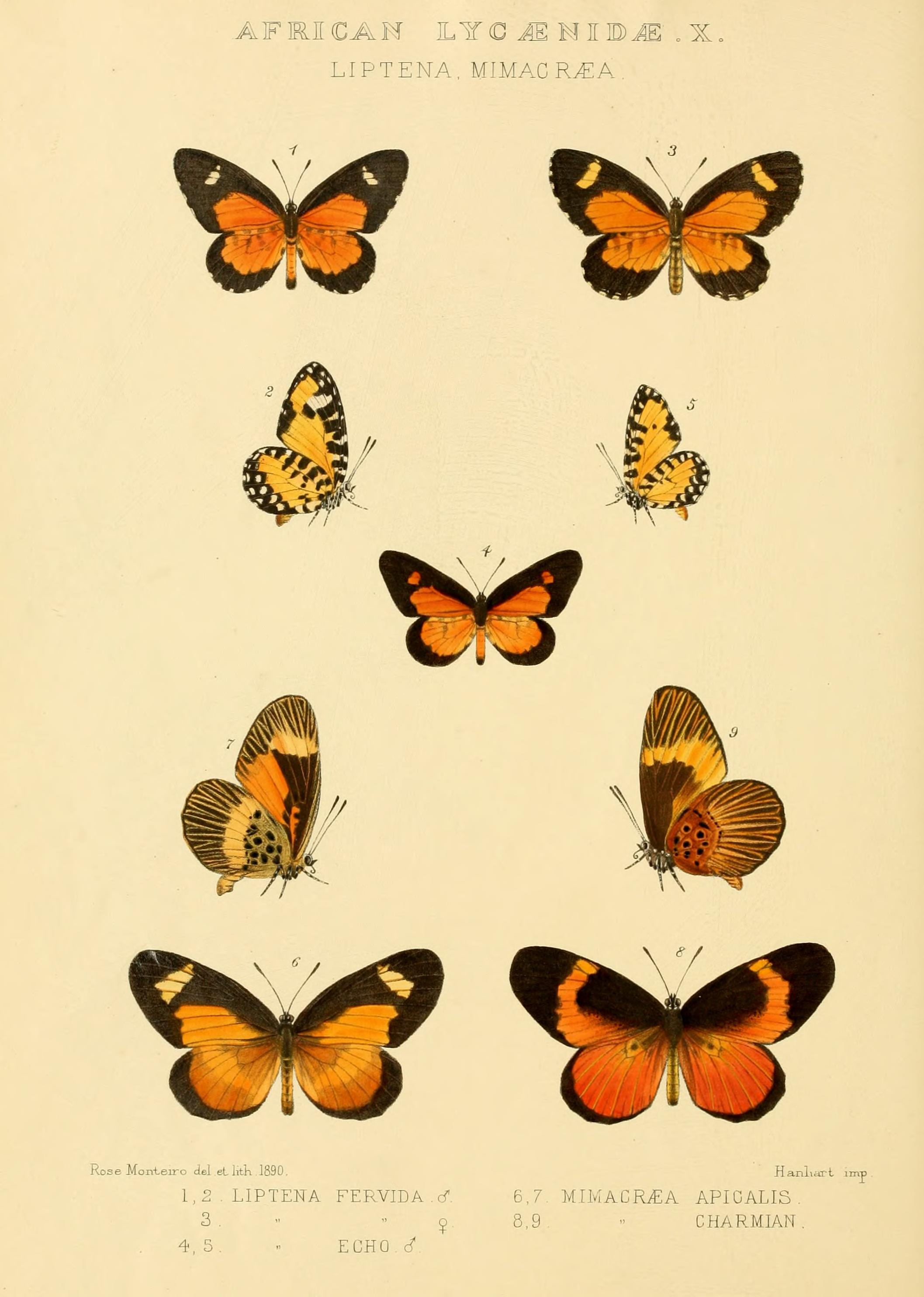

Scientific classification
- Domain: Eukaryota
- Kingdom: Animalia
- Phylum: Arthropoda
- Class: Insecta
- Order: Lepidoptera
- Family: Lycaenidae
- Genus: Mimacraea
- Species: M. charmian

Binomial name
- Mimacraea charmian Grose-Smith & Kirby, 1889

Synonyms
- Mimacraea schmidti Schultze, 1923; Mimacraea charmian ertli Joicey and Talbot, 1924

= Mimacraea charmian =

Species of butterfly

Mimacraea charmian, the elongata acraea mimic, is a butterfly in the family Lycaenidae. It is found in Nigeria, Cameroon and the western part of the Democratic Republic of the Congo. The habitat consists of forests.

Adults mimic Bematistes elongata.
