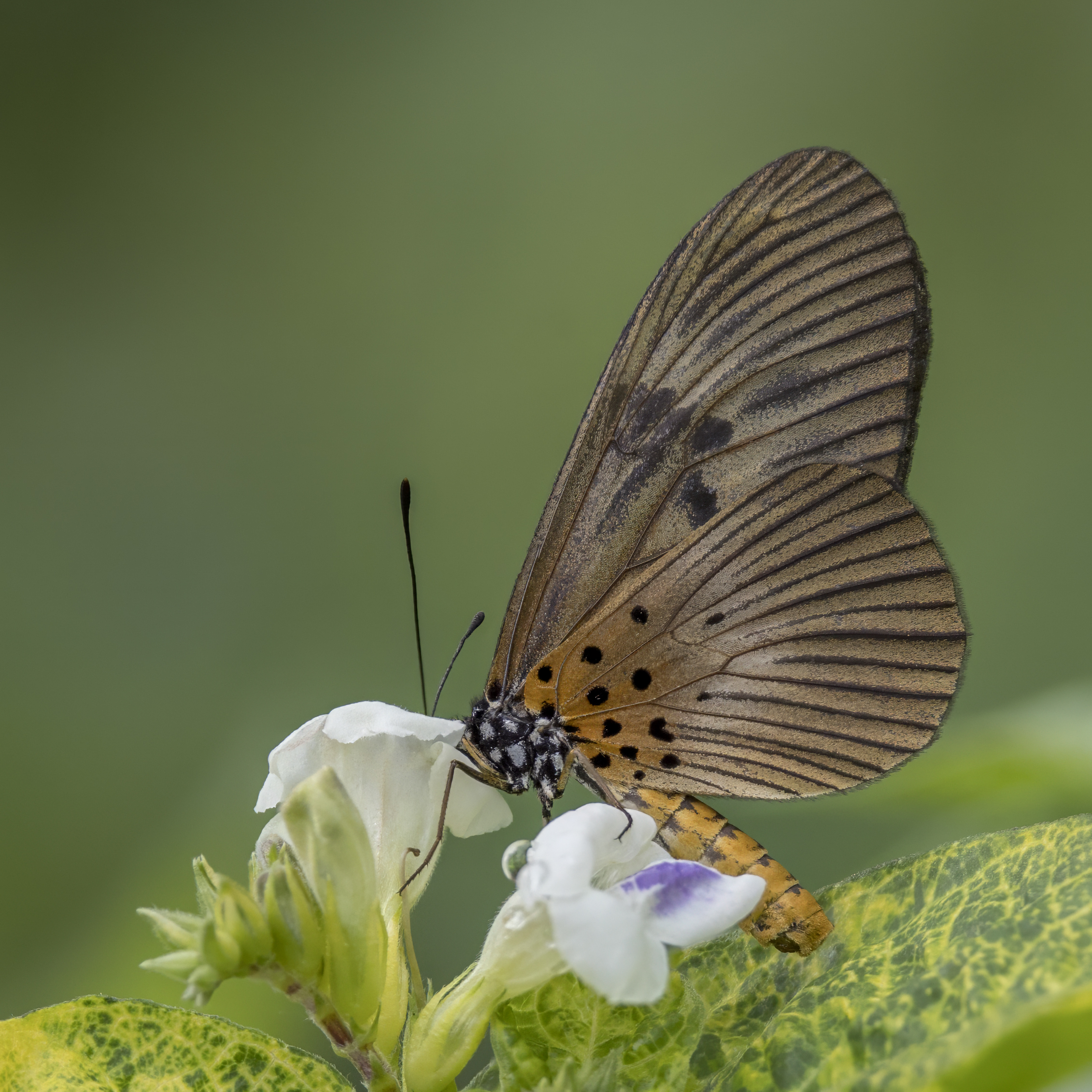
- in Ghana

Scientific classification
- Kingdom: Animalia
- Phylum: Arthropoda
- Clade: Pancrustacea
- Class: Insecta
- Order: Lepidoptera
- Family: Nymphalidae
- Genus: Bematistes
- Species: B. vestalis

Binomial name
- Bematistes vestalis Felder & Felder, 1865

Synonyms
- Acraea vestalis Felder & Felder, 1865; Acraea (Acraea) vestalis; Planema vestalis congoensis Le Doux, 1937; Planema vestalis stavelia Suffert, 1904; Planema umbra ab. fasciata Aurivillius, 1913

= Bematistes vestalis =

Smoky bematistes

Species of butterfly

Acraea vestalis, formerly Bematistes vestalis, the smoky bematistes, is a species of butterfly in the family Nymphalidae. It is found in Senegal, Guinea, Burkina Faso, Sierra Leone, Liberia, Ivory Coast, Ghana, Togo, Nigeria, Cameroon, Gabon, the Republic of the Congo, the Democratic Republic of the Congo and Tanzania.

== Description ==
P. vestalis is distinguished from all the other species by the transverse band on the upperside of the forewing, otherwise so sharply conspicuous, being entirely absent or only in its posterior part (in cellules l-2) distinct and light grey-yellow; cellule 1 a is nearly always yellowish to beyond the middle; the hindwing above is light brown-yellow at least to the middle, but beneath only yellow-brown at the base as far as the apex of the cell. In the type-form vestalis Fldr. (58 e) the upperside of the fore wing is unicolorous blackish to the base except for a yellow stripe at the hindmargin and the more or less distinct transverse band and the hindwing above has a black marginal band 7-9 mm. in breadth, sharply defined proximally, and beneath a usually very distinct whitish transverse band behind the basal part. Sierra Leone to the Niger. - In stavelia Suff. (59 a) the basal part of the forewing above is more or less broadly suffused with light yellow and the yellow basal area on the upperside of the hindwing is not sharply defined distally and sends out yellowish rays nearly to the distal margin; on the under surface of the hindwing the whitish median band is absent or indistinct. Cameroons to the Congo.

== Subspecies ==
- Acraea vestalis vestalis (Senegal, Guinea, Burkina Faso, Sierra Leone, Liberia, Ivory Coast, Ghana, Togo, Nigeria)
- Acraea vestalis congoensis (Le Doux, 1937) (Democratic Republic of the Congo: Lualaba and Lushala), western Tanzania)
- Acraea vestalis stavelia (Suffert, 1904) (Cameroon, Gabon, Congo, Democratic Republic of the Congo: north-west to Mongala)

Torben Larsen developed a species numbering system for his 2005 publication Butterflies of West Africa. The nominate subspecies is #1188. The 'Larsen' numbers have since been used with permission in A Sharp Eye on Butterflies of Ghana.

== Biology ==
The habitat consists of lowland forests.

This species is mimicked by the striata morph of Pseudacraea eurytus.

The larvae feed on Adenia cisampelloides.

== Taxonomy ==
See Pierre & Bernaud, 2014
