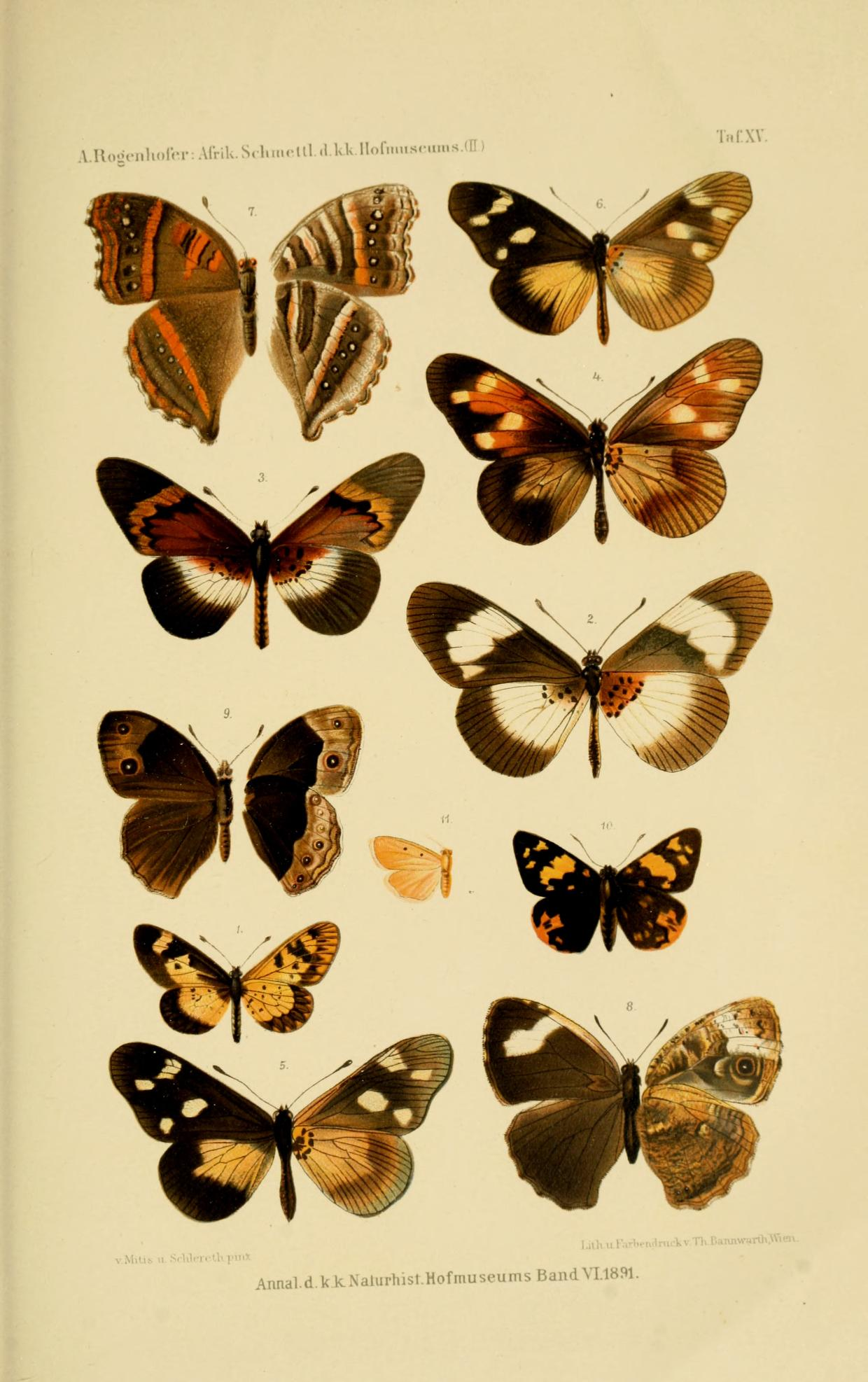
- Figure 3

Scientific classification
- Kingdom: Animalia
- Phylum: Arthropoda
- Clade: Pancrustacea
- Class: Insecta
- Order: Lepidoptera
- Family: Nymphalidae
- Genus: Bematistes
- Species: B. quadricolor

Binomial name
- Bematistes quadricolor (Rogenhöfer, 1891)

Synonyms
- Planema quadricolor Rogenhofer, 1891; Acraea quadricolor (Rogenhofer, 1891); Acraea (Acraea) quadricolor; Planema quadricolor itumbana Jordan, 1910; Planema latifasciata Sharpe, 1892; Bematistes quadricolor latifasciata ab. pallescens Gabriel, 1939; Planema quadricolor leptis Jordan, 1910

= Bematistes quadricolor =

Species of butterfly

Bematistes quadricolor is a species of butterfly in the family Nymphalidae. It is found in the Democratic Republic of the Congo, Burundi, Uganda, Kenya and Tanzania.

== Description ==
P. quadricolor may be easily known by having the basal half of the forewing above bright chestnut- brown and separated from the bright orange-yellow transverse band by an irregularly interrupted line of the black ground-colour. The transverse band reaches to the hindmargin or at least to vein 1 and at vein 2 almost to the distal margin. The hinclwing has a sharply defined, narrow (4–6 mm. in breadth) white or light yellow median band. The apex of the forewing and the marginal band of the hindwing (8–10 mm. in breadth) are almost pure black. - quadricolor Rogenh. (58 c). The orange-yellow transverse band of the forewing is about 4 mm. in breadth in cellule 3 and leaves a considerable part of the base of this cellule free. The median band of the hindwing in both sexes white. German East Africa. -leptis Jord. (59 d). The transverse band of the fore wing in cellule 3 only 2 mm. in breadth, posteriorly indistinct or broken up into spots; median band of the hindwing white. Brit. East Africa: Nairobi. - latifasciata E. Sharpe (58 d). The transverse band of the forewing in cellule 3 6–8 mm. in breadth, only leaving a very small part of the base of the cellule free; the proximal black boundary of the transverse band is very narrow and the median band of the hindwing above is light yellow in the male, white in the female. Ruwenzori and Uganda as far as Mt. Elgon. - itumbana Jord. The transverse band of the forewing is even broader than in latifasciata, in the male about 9 mm. in breadth; the median band of the hindwing white. German East Africa: Itumba.

== Subspecies ==
- B. q. quadricolor (north-eastern Tanzania)
- B. q. itumbana (Jordan, 1910) (eastern Tanzania)
- B. q. latifasciata (Sharpe, 1892) (western Uganda, Burundi, Kenya: west of the Rift Valley, north-western Tanzania, Democratic Republic of the Congo: Ituri and Kivu)
- B. q. leptis (Jordan, 1910) (Kenya: east of the Rift Valley, north-eastern Tanzania)
- B. q. mahale Kielland, 1990 (western Tanzania)
- B. q. morogoro Carpenter & Jackson, 1950 (north-eastern Tanzania)
- B. q. uluguru Kielland, 1990 (eastern Tanzania)

== Biology ==
The habitat consists of montane forests.

The larvae feed on Adenia cissampeloides, Vitis and Passiflora species.

== Taxonomy ==
See Pierre & Bernaud, 2014
