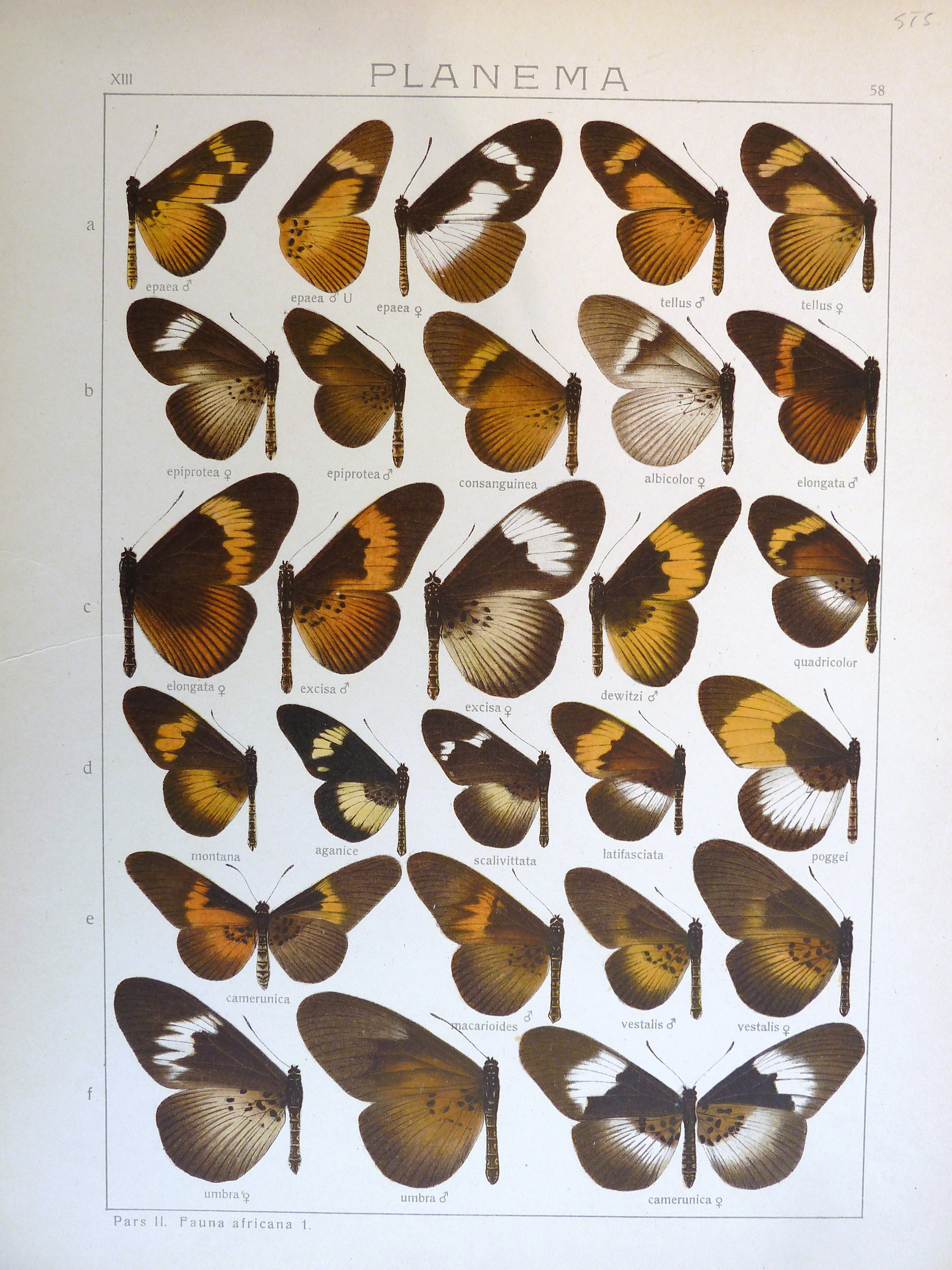
- In Adalbert Seitz's Fauna Africana

Scientific classification
- Kingdom: Animalia
- Phylum: Arthropoda
- Clade: Pancrustacea
- Class: Insecta
- Order: Lepidoptera
- Family: Nymphalidae
- Genus: Bematistes
- Species: B. epiprotea

Binomial name
- Bematistes epiprotea (Butler, 1874)

Synonyms
- Planema epiprotea Butler, 1874; Acraea epiprotea (Butler, 1874); Acraea (Acraea) epiprotea; Planema epiprotea ab. conformis Schultze, 1923

= Bematistes epiprotea =

Species of butterfly

Bematistes epiprotea, the insipid bematistes, is a species of butterfly in the family Nymphalidae. It is found in southern Nigeria, Cameroon, Gabon, the Republic of the Congo, the southern part of the Democratic Republic of the Congo, Sudan and western Tanzania.

== Description ==
P. epiprotea Btlr. (58 b) is distinguished by having the transverse band of the forewing placed far beyond the apex of the cell, so that it may be regarded rather as a subapical than a median band; it is straight, directed towards the hindmargin and posteriorly bounded by vein 3, in the male smoke-yellow and 4 mm. in breadth, in the female white and 7 mm. in breadth; in the male the basal part of the forewing to vein 3 is smoke-brown, but in the female black-brown with a small white hindmarginal spot, which only reaches the fold of cellule 1 b, but is continued on the hindwing as an indistinct median band to vein 2 or 3. In the male the hindwing is smoke-brown above, somewhat darker towards the distal margin. The under surface of the hindwing in both sexes is smoke-grey to the base. Niger to the Congo.

== Biology ==
The habitat consists of lowland forests.

The larvae feed on Barteria species.

== Taxonomy ==
See Pierre & Bernaud, 2014
