= Bematistes persanguinea =

Scientific classification
- Kingdom: Animalia
- Phylum: Arthropoda
- Clade: Pancrustacea
- Class: Insecta
- Order: Lepidoptera
- Family: Nymphalidae
- Genus: Bematistes
- Species: B. persanguinea

Binomial name
- Bematistes persanguinea (Rebel, 1914)

Synonyms
- Planema persanguinea Rebel, 1914; Acraea persanguinea (Rebel, 1914); Acraea (Acraea) persanguinea; Planema consanguinoides Le Doux, 1931; Bematistes consanguinoides

Species of butterfly

Bematistes persanguinea is a species of butterfly in the family Nymphalidae. It is found in south-western Uganda, Rwanda, Burundi and the Democratic Republic of the Congo (Mongala, Uele, Lualaba).

== Taxonomy ==
See Pierre & Bernaud, 2014
