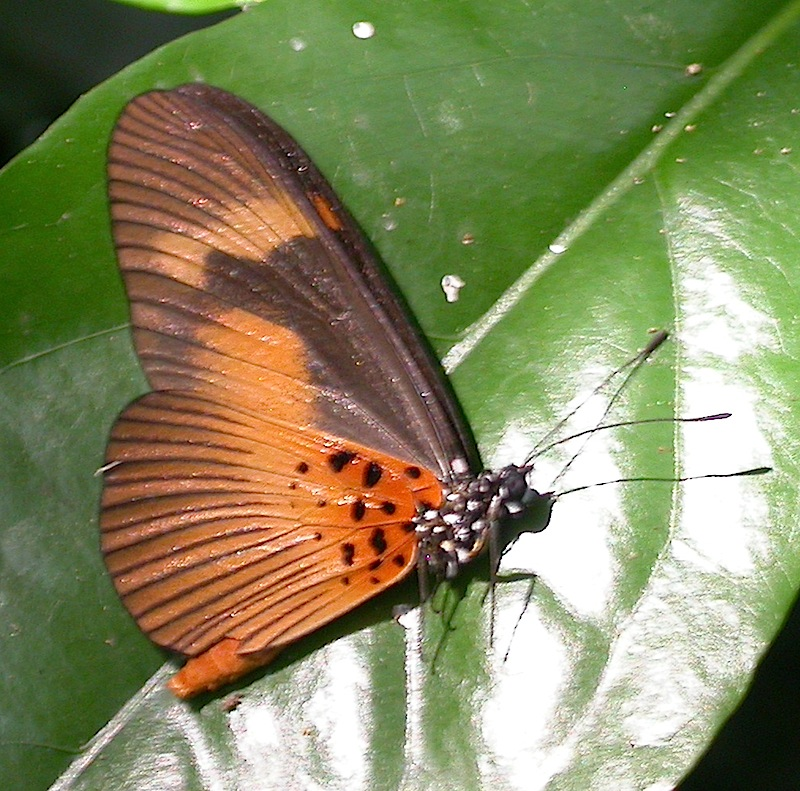
- Bematistes epaea

Scientific classification
- Domain: Eukaryota
- Kingdom: Animalia
- Phylum: Arthropoda
- Class: Insecta
- Order: Lepidoptera
- Family: Nymphalidae
- Tribe: Acraeini
- Genus: Bematistes; Hemming, 1935

= Bematistes =

Genus of brush-footed butterflies

Bematistes is a genus of butterflies in the family Nymphalidae. The genus is often included in Acraea.

== Species ==
- umbra species group:
  - Bematistes adrasta (Weymer, 1892)
  - Bematistes aganice (Hewitson, 1852)
  - Bematistes alcinoe (Felder, 1865)
  - Bematistes consanguinea (Aurivillius, 1893)
  - Bematistes elongata (Butler, 1874)
  - Bematistes epiprotea (Butler, 1874)
  - Bematistes excisa (Butler, 1874)
  - Bematistes formosa (Butler, 1874)
  - Bematistes macaria (Fabricius, 1793)
  - Bematistes macarista (Sharpe, 1906)
  - Bematistes obliqua (Aurivillius, 1913)
  - Bematistes persanguinea (Rebel, 1914)
  - Bematistes poggei (Dewitz, 1879)
  - Bematistes pseudeuryta (Godman & Salvin, 1890)
  - Bematistes quadricolor Rogenhöfer, 1891
  - Bematistes scalivittata (Butler, 1896)
  - Bematistes umbra (Drury, [1782])
  - Bematistes vestalis (Felder, 1865)
- epaea species group:
  - Bematistes epaea (Cramer, 1779)
  - Bematistes tellus (Aurivillius, 1893)
- incertae sedis:
  - Bematistes indentata (Butler, 1895)
  - Bematistes leopoldina (Aurivillius, 1895)

Acraea simulata is sometimes placed in the masamba group of Acraea, sometimes included in the Bematistes umbra group.
