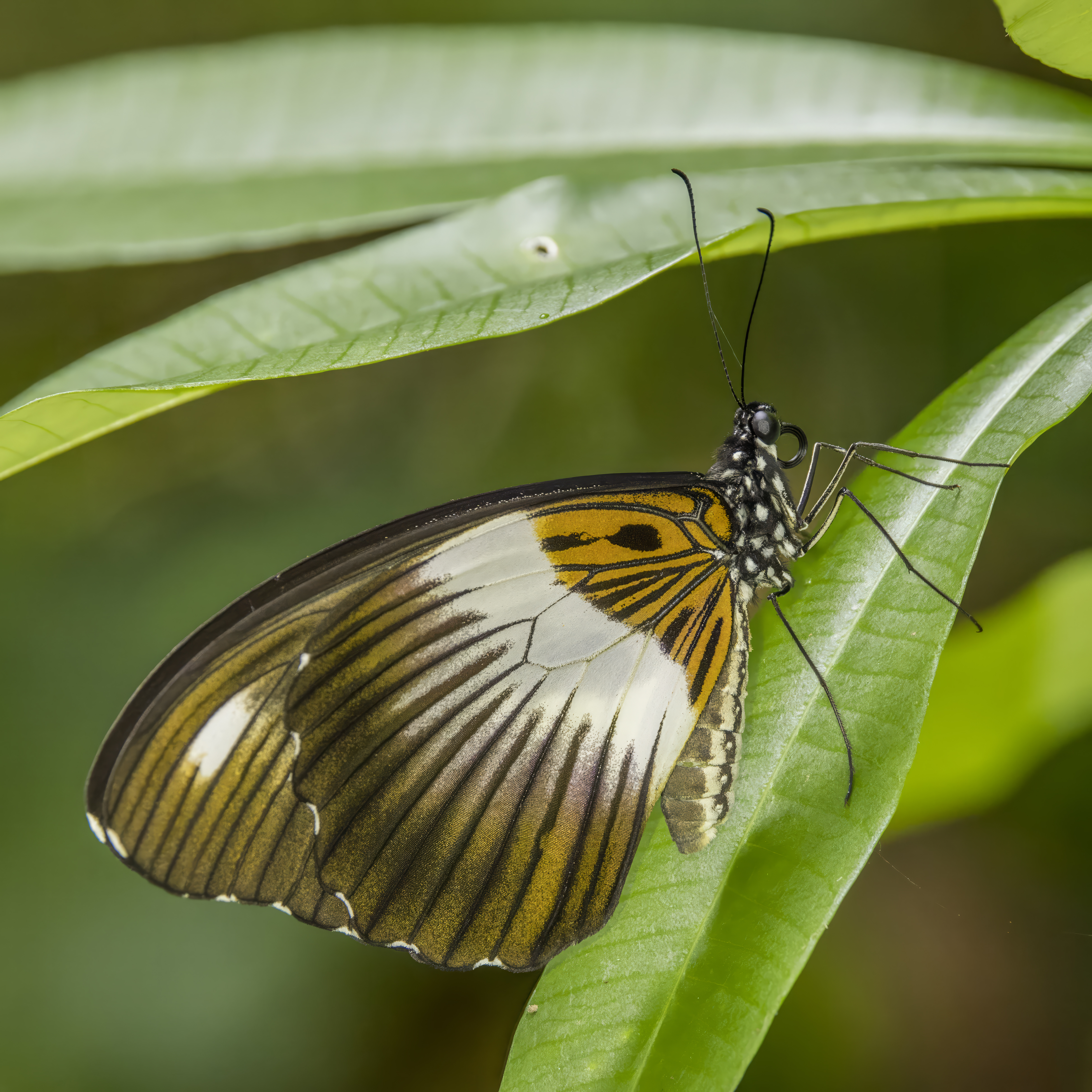
- In Ghana
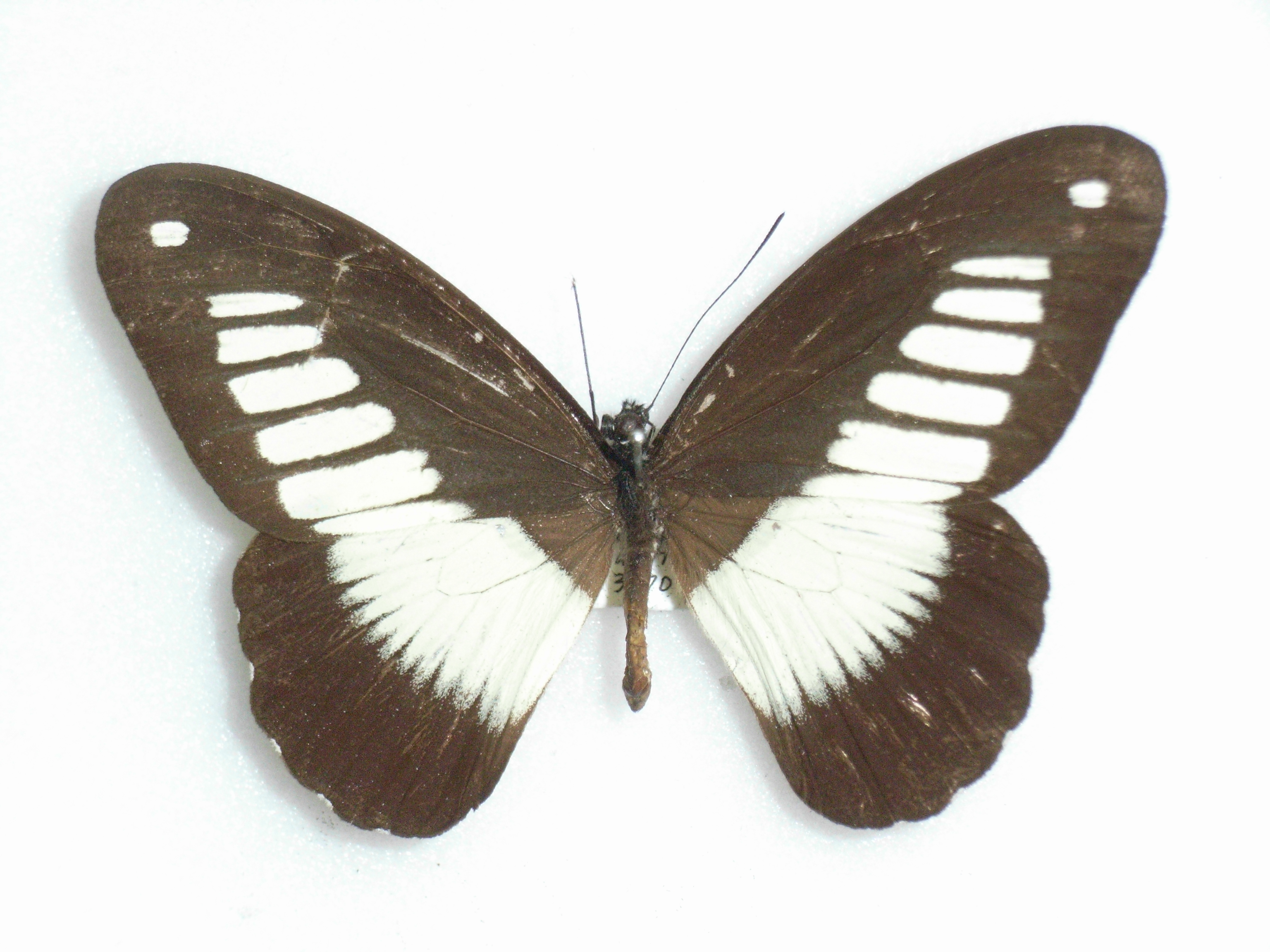

Scientific classification
- Kingdom: Animalia
- Phylum: Arthropoda
- Clade: Pancrustacea
- Class: Insecta
- Order: Lepidoptera
- Family: Papilionidae
- Genus: Papilio
- Species: P. cynorta

Binomial name
- Papilio cynorta Fabricius, 1793

Synonyms
- Papilio zerynthius Boisduval, 1836; Papilio boisduvallianus Westwood, 1842; Papilio triptolemus Ehrmann, 1918; Papilio cynorta norcyta Suffert, 1904; Papilio gallienus peculiaris Neave, 1904; Papilio cynorta f. lavochrea Le Cerf, 1924; Papilio cynorta f. ochrospila Le Cerf, 1924; Papilio cynorta f. acraeamimus Bryk, 1928; Papilio cynorta f. albofurculatus Bryk, 1928; Papilio cynorta f. parageoides Stoneham, 1944; Papilio cynorta cynorta f. agayana Stoneham, 1951; Papilio cynorta cynorta f. bwambensis Stoneham, 1951

= Papilio cynorta =

Species of butterfly

Papilio cynorta, the mimetic swallowtail or common white banded papilio, is a butterfly of the family Papilionidae. It is found in Africa, including Sierra Leone, Liberia, Ivory Coast, Ghana, Togo, southern Nigeria, Cameroon, Equatorial Guinea, the Democratic Republic of the Congo, Angola, the Republic of the Congo, Uganda, Kenya and Tanzania.

Adult females mimic Bematistes epaea, the common bematistes butterfly.

The larvae feed on Clausena, Vepris, Calodendrum, Citrus and Fagara species.

== Taxonomy ==
Papilio cynorta is the nominal member of the cynorta species group. The members of the clade are:

- Papilio arnoldiana Vane-Wright, 1995
- Papilio cynorta Fabricius, 1793
- Papilio plagiatus Aurivillius, 1898

Torben Larsen developed a species numbering system for his 2005 publication Butterflies of West Africa. This species is #18. The 'Larsen' numbers have since been used with permission in A Sharp Eye on Butterflies of Ghana.
