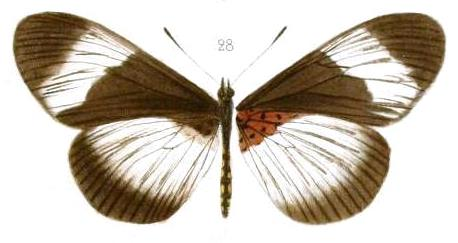
- Bematistes adrasta adrasta, male from Nguru, Zanzibar

Scientific classification
- Kingdom: Animalia
- Phylum: Arthropoda
- Clade: Pancrustacea
- Class: Insecta
- Order: Lepidoptera
- Family: Nymphalidae
- Genus: Bematistes
- Species: B. adrasta

Binomial name
- Bematistes adrasta Weymer, 1892

Synonyms
- Acraea (Acraea) adrasta; Acraea adrasta; Acraea machoni Oberthür, 1893; Planema haydni Suffert, 1904; Planema adrasta pancalis Jordan, 1910

= Bematistes adrasta =

Species of butterfly

Bematistes adrasta is a species of butterfly in the family Nymphalidae. It is found in the Democratic Republic of the Congo, Kenya and Tanzania. The habitat consists of lowland forests.

== Subspecies ==
- Bematistes adrasta adrasta — southern coast of Kenya, north-eastern Tanzania
- Bematistes adrasta pancalis (Jordan, 1910) — Democratic Republic of the Congo
