= Papilio arnoldiana =

Scientific classification
- Kingdom: Animalia
- Phylum: Arthropoda
- Clade: Pancrustacea
- Class: Insecta
- Order: Lepidoptera
- Family: Papilionidae
- Genus: Papilio
- Species: P. arnoldiana

Binomial name
- Papilio arnoldiana Vane-Wright, 1995

Synonyms
- Papilio cynorta arnoldi Poulton, 1925

Species of butterfly

Papilio arnoldiana is a species of swallowtail butterfly from the genus Papilio that is found in south-western Ethiopia.

== Taxonomy ==
Papilio arnoldiana is a member of the cynorta species group. The members of the clade are:

- Papilio arnoldiana Vane-Wright, 1995
- Papilio cynorta Fabricius, 1793
- Papilio plagiatus Aurivillius, 1898
