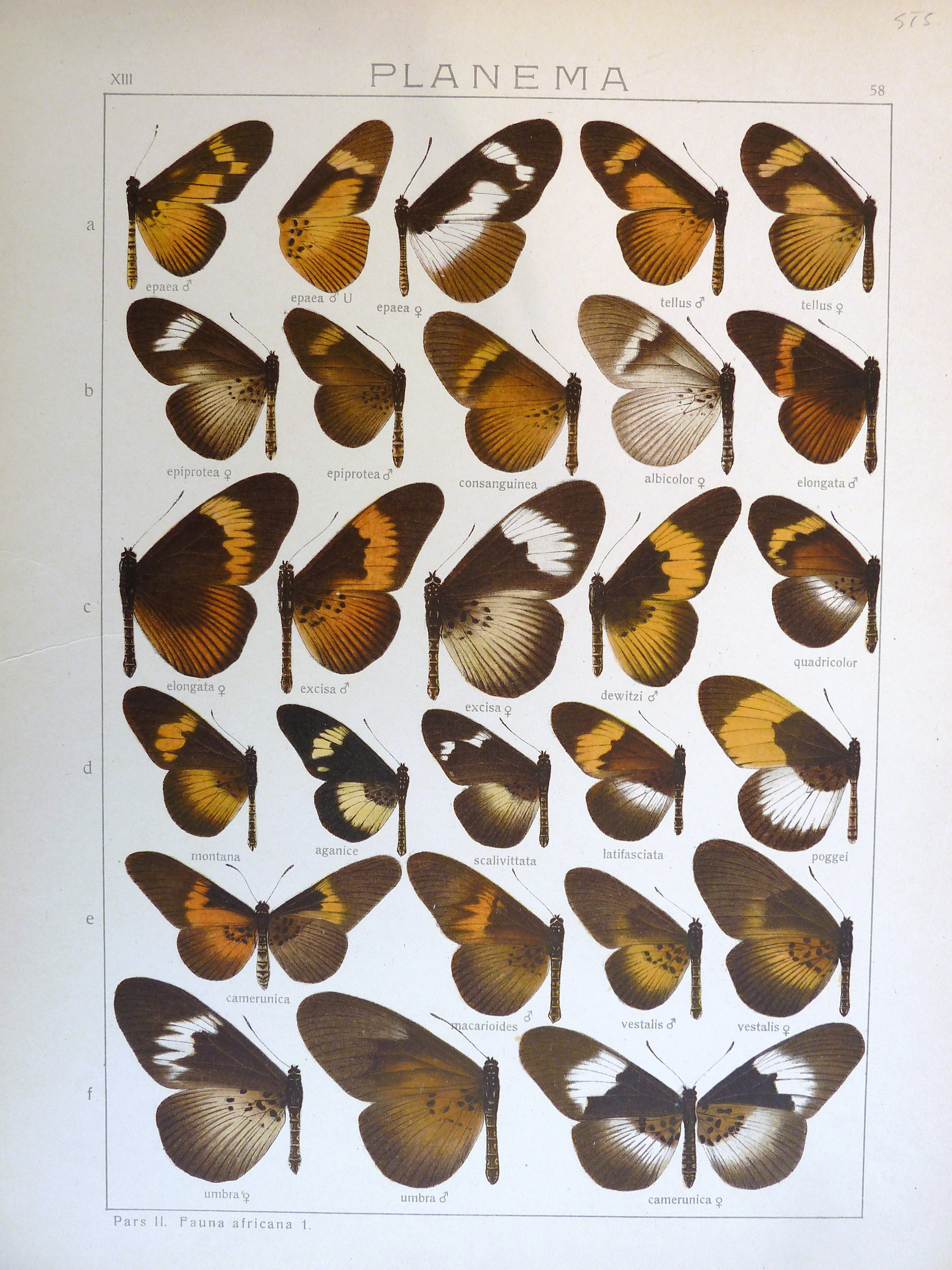
- In Adalbert Seitz's Fauna Africana

Scientific classification
- Kingdom: Animalia
- Phylum: Arthropoda
- Clade: Pancrustacea
- Class: Insecta
- Order: Lepidoptera
- Family: Nymphalidae
- Genus: Bematistes
- Species: B. elongata

Binomial name
- Bematistes elongata (Butler, 1874)

Synonyms
- Acraea elongata (Butler, 1874); Planema elongata Butler, 1874; Acraeax (Acraea) elongata; Planema elongata var. serena Schultze, 1923; Planema elongata f. varia Le Doux, 1937

= Bematistes elongata =

Species of butterfly

Bematistes elongata, the elongate bematistes, is a species of butterfly in the family Nymphalidae. It is found in Nigeria, Cameroon, Gabon, the Republic of the Congo and the Democratic Republic of the Congo.

== Description ==
P. elongata Btlr. (58 b, c) is an easily recognized species with the sexes marked almost alike. In the male the ground-colour is dark black-brown above with a brown-yellow transverse band only about 4 mm. in breadth, which reaches the hindmargin and is but little curved; its spots are rather deeply cleft distally. The hindwing is dark black-brown in the basal part almost to the middle and has there a red-brown transverse band about 10 mm. in breadth at vein 2 and narrowing anteriorly, which is completely intersected by the black veins and streaks between the veins; the black marginal band is sharply defined, but at the apex only 2mm. in breadth and gradually narrowed posteriorly; the under surface of the hindwing is uniform smoke-brown and the black streaks nearly reach the cell here also. The female only differs in having the transverse band of the forewing somewhat broader and much lighter. Cameroons to the Congo.

== Biology ==
The habitat consists of primary forests.

This species is mimicked by Pseudacraea kuenowii gottbergi and Mimacraea charmian.

== Taxonomy ==
See Pierre & Bernaud, 2014
