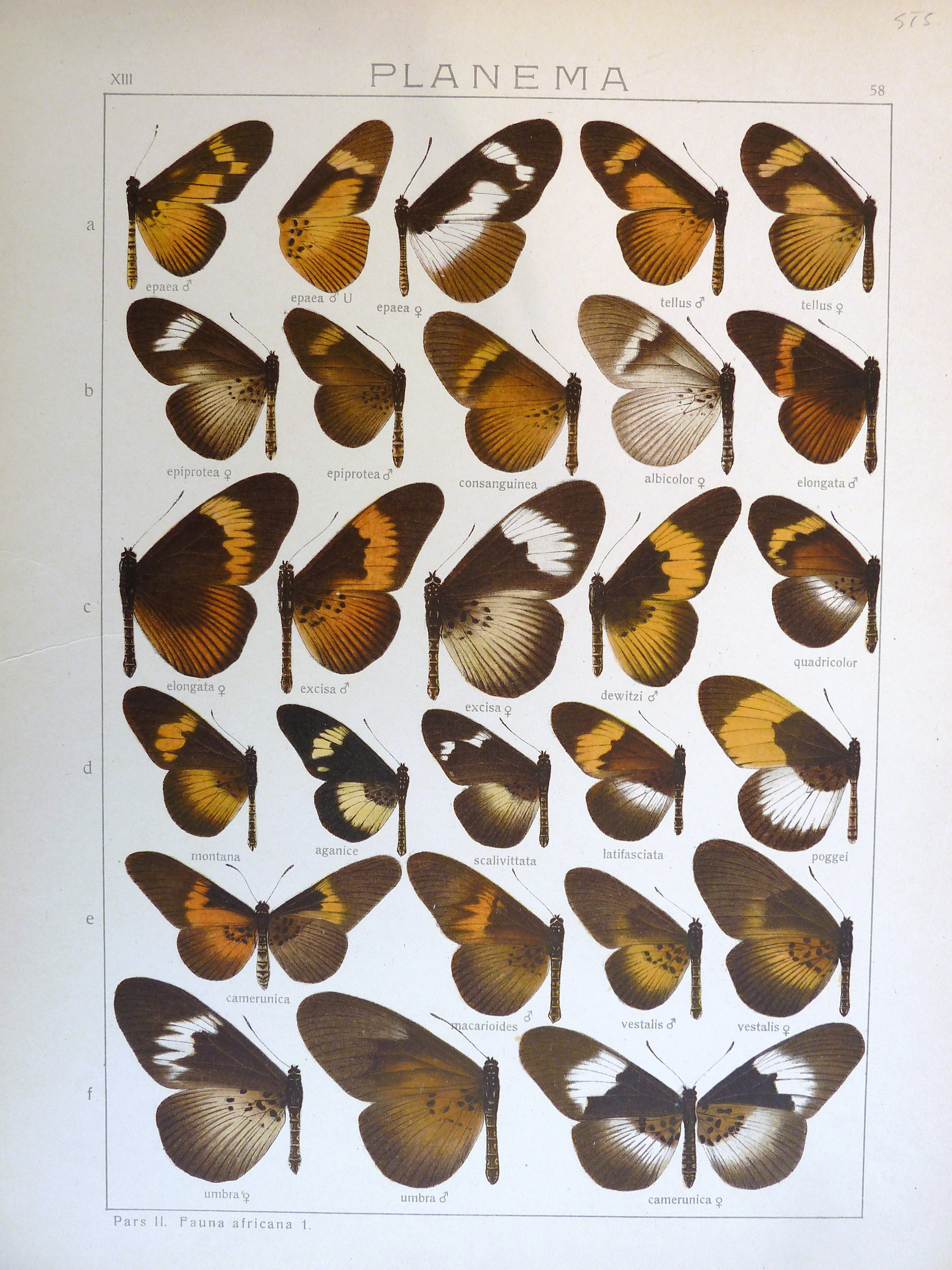
- In Adalbert Seitz's Fauna Africana

Scientific classification
- Kingdom: Animalia
- Phylum: Arthropoda
- Clade: Pancrustacea
- Class: Insecta
- Order: Lepidoptera
- Family: Nymphalidae
- Genus: Bematistes
- Species: B. excisa

Binomial name
- Bematistes excisa (Butler, 1874)

Synonyms
- Planema excisa Butler, 1874; Acraea excisa (Butler, 1874); Acraea (Acraea) excisa

= Bematistes excisa =

Species of butterfly

Bematistes excisa, the excised bematistes, is a species of butterfly in the family Nymphalidae. It is found in southern Nigeria, Cameroon, Bioko, Gabon, the Republic of the Congo and the western part of the Democratic Republic of the Congo.

== Description ==
P. excisa Btlr. (58 c). The differences between this species and Bematistes pseudeuryta [ are given under that species] . The orange-yellow transverse band of the forewing has an almost uniform breadth of 8-10mm. and is separated from the distal margin throughout; it is basally prolonged at the hindmargin and usually also accompanied proximally by yellow scales on both sides of vein 2. The upperside of the hindwing is brown-yellow nearly to the base, with free black dots in the basal part, black veins, sharply defined black marginal band about 3 mm. in breadth, and in the distal half with thick black streaks on the interneural folds. The forewing beneath as above, only somewhat lighter. The hindwing beneath yellow-brown to the distal margin, at the base a little darker and more reddish; the basal dots standing out sharply; the veins and the interneural streaks black as above. The female is considerably larger and has the transverse band of the fore wing white, interrupted in cellule lb, and the ground-colour of the hindwing above yellowish white; the dark marginal band of the latter is somewhat broader and less sharply defined; the under surface of the hindwing is light smoke-brown, somewhat darker at the distal margin and a little more yellowish at the base. Cameroons to the Congo. .

== Biology ==
The habitat consists of forests with a dense understorey.

The larvae feed on Adenia cisampelloides.

== Taxonomy ==
See Pierre & Bernaud, 2014
