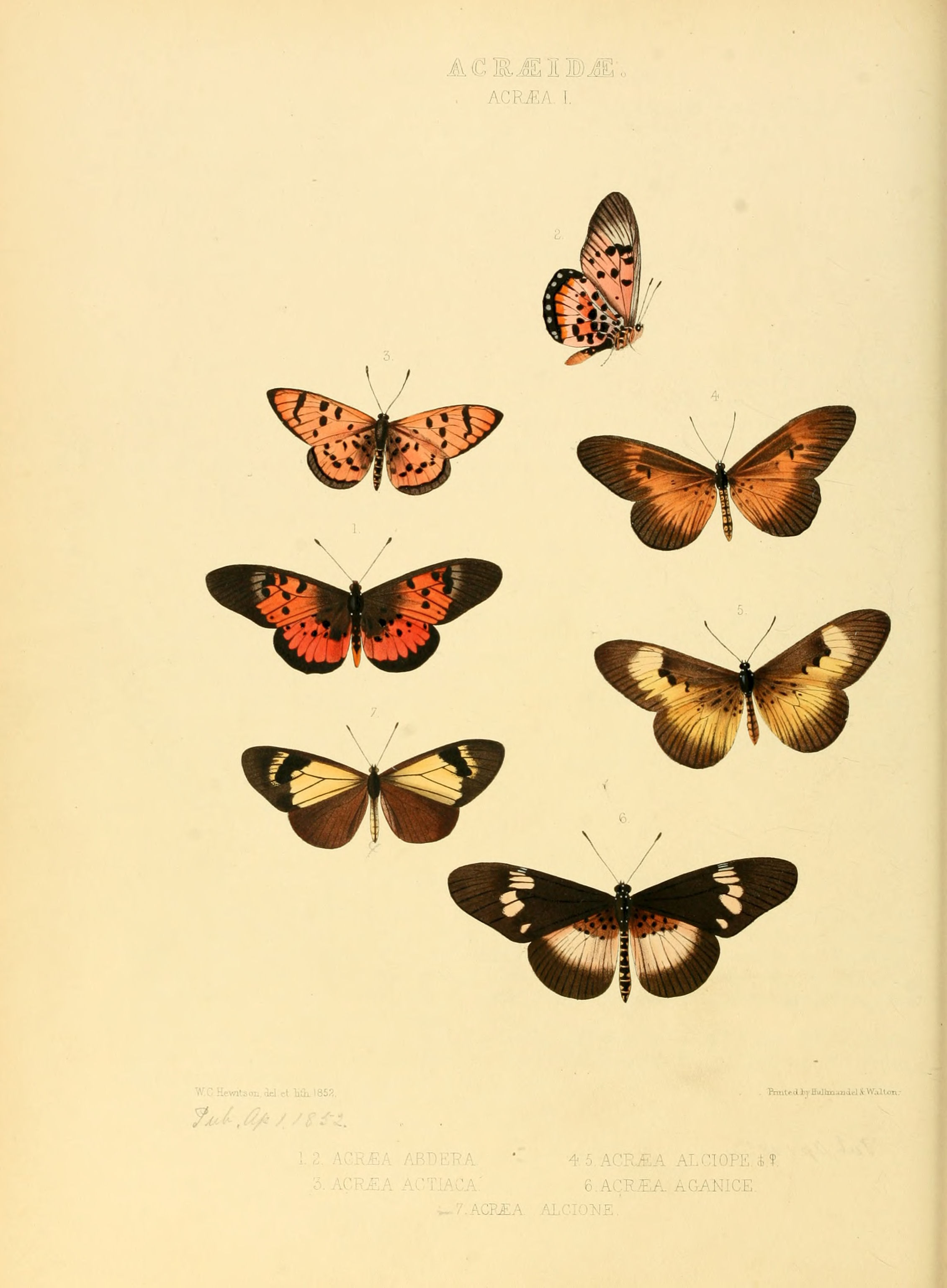
- Original illustration (figure 6) in Hewitson's Illustrations of New Species of Exotic Butterflies

Scientific classification
- Kingdom: Animalia
- Phylum: Arthropoda
- Clade: Pancrustacea
- Class: Insecta
- Order: Lepidoptera
- Family: Nymphalidae
- Genus: Bematistes
- Species: B. aganice

Binomial name
- Bematistes aganice (Hewitson, 1852)

Synonyms
- Acraea aganice Hewitson, 1852; Planema montana Butler, 1888; Acraea bertha Vuillot, 1891; Planema meruana Rogenhofer, 1891; Planema chanleri Holland, 1896 named for William A. Chanler.; Planema aganice nicega Suffert, 1904; Planema aganice r. nyassae Carpenter, 1920; Planema aganice orientalis Ungemach, 1932; Bematistes aganice ugandae van Someren, 1936

= Bematistes aganice =

Wanderer

Species of butterfly

Bematistes aganice, the wanderer, is a species of butterfly of the family Nymphalidae. It is found in southern and south-eastern Africa.

== Description ==
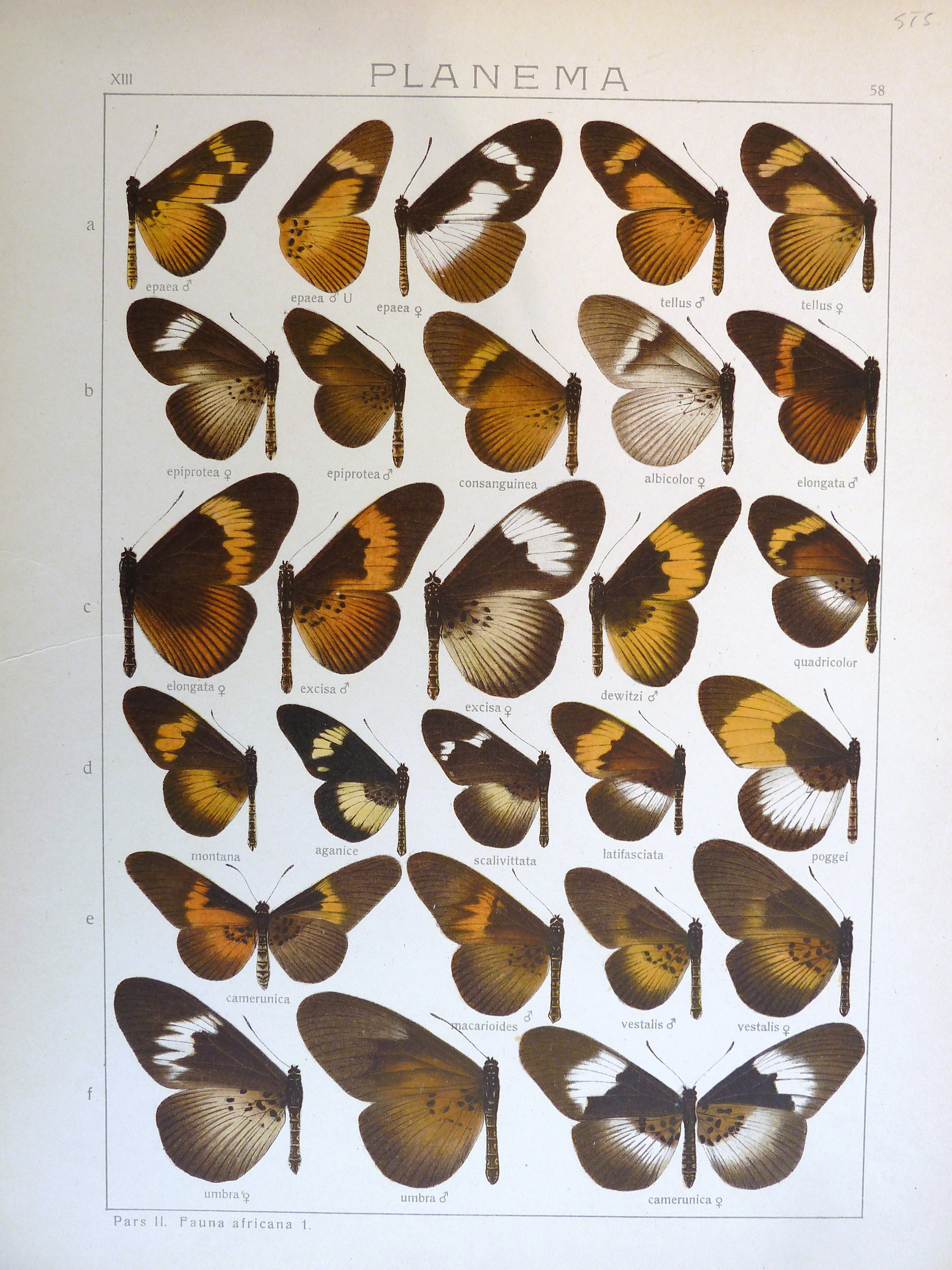
Seitz Fauna Africana Taf 58

P. aganice Hew. (58 d) nearly approaches the preceding species [montana now Bematistes aganice montana], but has a narrower transverse band on the forewing and especially a much narrower median band on the hindwing; these are in the male white-yellow or white, in the female white; the transverse band of the forewing is in the male often almost broken up into spots and the spot in cellule 1 b very small or absent; the ground-colour in fresh specimens is almost black and the sharply defined marginal band of the hindwing in both sexes is 9-11mm. in breadth; the base of the hindwing is nearly black above, dark brown beneath; thus the sexes differ but little from one another. - Larva whitish green with long yellowish spines, yellow-brown head, and blue dots dorsally and laterally. Pupa whitish green with four pairs of long light red dorsal spines as in camerunica and small divaricating horns on the head. This species in the only endemic Planema in South Africa and is distributed from Kaffirland to Zambesi; in East Africa it is represented by P. montana, which is probably only a race of the same species. P. montana Btlr. (58 d ) male- forewing above blackish with a narrow orange-yellow transverse band only about 5–6 mm. in breadth, which is proximally incised especially in cellule 3, reaches vein2 and is accompanied by a usually free spot in cellule lb; the hindwing above at the base narrowly black-brown, then with broad orange-yellow median band and sharply defined blackish marginal band about 6 mm. in breadth; the under surface only differs in the somewhat paler ground-colour and the sharply defined red-brown basal part of the hindwing. The female is larger with white transverse band, 8–10 mm. in breadth, on the forewing, which, as in the male is deeply incised proximally both in cellule 3 and at vein 2, and with a white median band on the hind wing, 14–15 mm. in breadth; the marginal band of the hindwing is sharply defined, as in the and has thick black streaks on the interneural folds. Nyassaland to British East Africa. female-ab. meruana Rogenh. Transverse band of the hindwing smoky yellowish. Meru Mountain, ab. nicega Suff. has the transverse band of the forewing in the male only 2.5–3 mm. in breadth and the median band of the hindwing in the female light yellow instead of white. Nyassaland. . The wingspan is 60–65 mm for males and 70–75 mm for females.

== Subspecies ==
- B. a. aganice (Cape to KwaZulu-Natal, Transvaal, southern Mozambique, eastern Zimbabwe)
- B. a. montana (Butler, 1888) (from eastern Kenya to northern Tanzania)
- B. a. nicega Suffert (southern Tanzania, southern Zaire (Shaba), north-eastern Zambia, northern Malawi)
- B. a. nyassae Carpenter (southern Malawi)
- B. a. orientalis Ungemach (south-western Ethiopia, southern Sudan, northern Uganda)
- B. a. ugandae van Someren, 1936 (northern shore of Lake Victoria)

== Biology ==
Adults are on wing year round, but are more common from the end of October to March.

The larvae feed on Passiflora edulis, Passiflora incarnata, Passiflora caerulea and Adenia gummifera.

== Taxonomy ==
See Pierre & Bernaud, 2014
