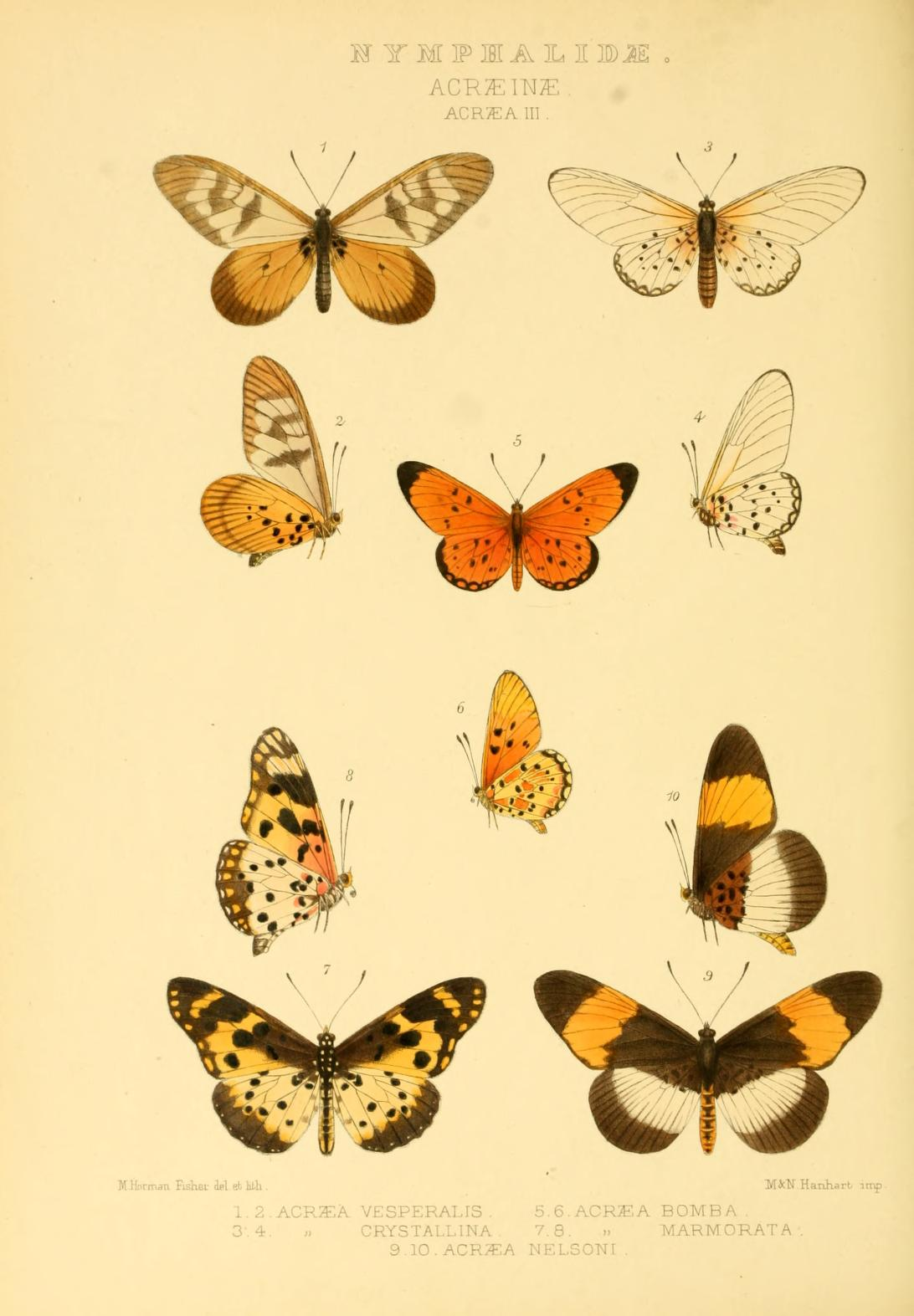
- Figure 9 and 10 B. p. nelsoni

Scientific classification
- Kingdom: Animalia
- Phylum: Arthropoda
- Clade: Pancrustacea
- Class: Insecta
- Order: Lepidoptera
- Family: Nymphalidae
- Genus: Bematistes
- Species: B. poggei

Binomial name
- Bematistes poggei (Dewitz, 1879)

Synonyms
- Acraea poggei Dewitz, 1879; Acraea (Acraea) poggei Dewitz, 1879; Planema entalis Jordan, 1910; Planema poggei amela Hering, 1936; Planema poggei nelsoni f. flava Le Doux, 1937; Acraea nelsoni Grose-Smith & Kirby, 1892; Planema poggei paragoga Hering, 1936; Planema nelsoni ras Ungemach, 1932

= Bematistes poggei =

Species of butterfly

Bematistes poggei is a species of butterfly in the family Nymphalidae. It is found in Zambia, Angola, the Democratic Republic of the Congo, Tanzania, Sudan, Uganda, Kenya, Tanzania and Ethiopia.

== Description ==
P. poggei Dew. (58 d). The sexes are similarly coloured and marked; the ground-colour of the upper surface is nearly black; the transverse band of the forewing is light orange-yellow, 10-15mm. in breadth, on the distal side more or less convex, towards the base out off obliquely so that its proximal boundary-line is placed almost vertically to the costal margin; its spot in cellule 2 is obliquely cut off and almost reaches the base of vein 3; in the base of cellule 3 a small rounded black spot; the transverse band reaches to the hindmargin and in cellules 1 -2 usually also to the distal margin; the median band of the hindwing is white, sharply defined and 8-10 mm. in breadth; the sharply prominent black marginal band is consequently 6-10 mm. in breadth; the basal area of the hindwing beneath is deep red-brown. Angola to Lake Kivu. -nelsoni Sm. only differs in having the transverse band of the forewing posteriorly (in cellules 1 a and 1 b) narrowed and irregularly incised. Congo region to Uganda.

== Biology ==
The habitat consists of forests and riverine thickets.

The larvae feed on Adenia and Vitis species.

== Subspecies ==
- B. p. poggei (north-western and north-eastern Zambia, Angola, Democratic Republic of the Congo: Shaba, western Tanzania)
- B. p. nelsoni Grose-Smith & Kirby, 1892 (north-eastern Democratic Republic of the Congo, north-western Tanzania, Sudan, Uganda, western Kenya)
- B. p. ras (Ungemach, 1932) (south-western Ethiopia)
