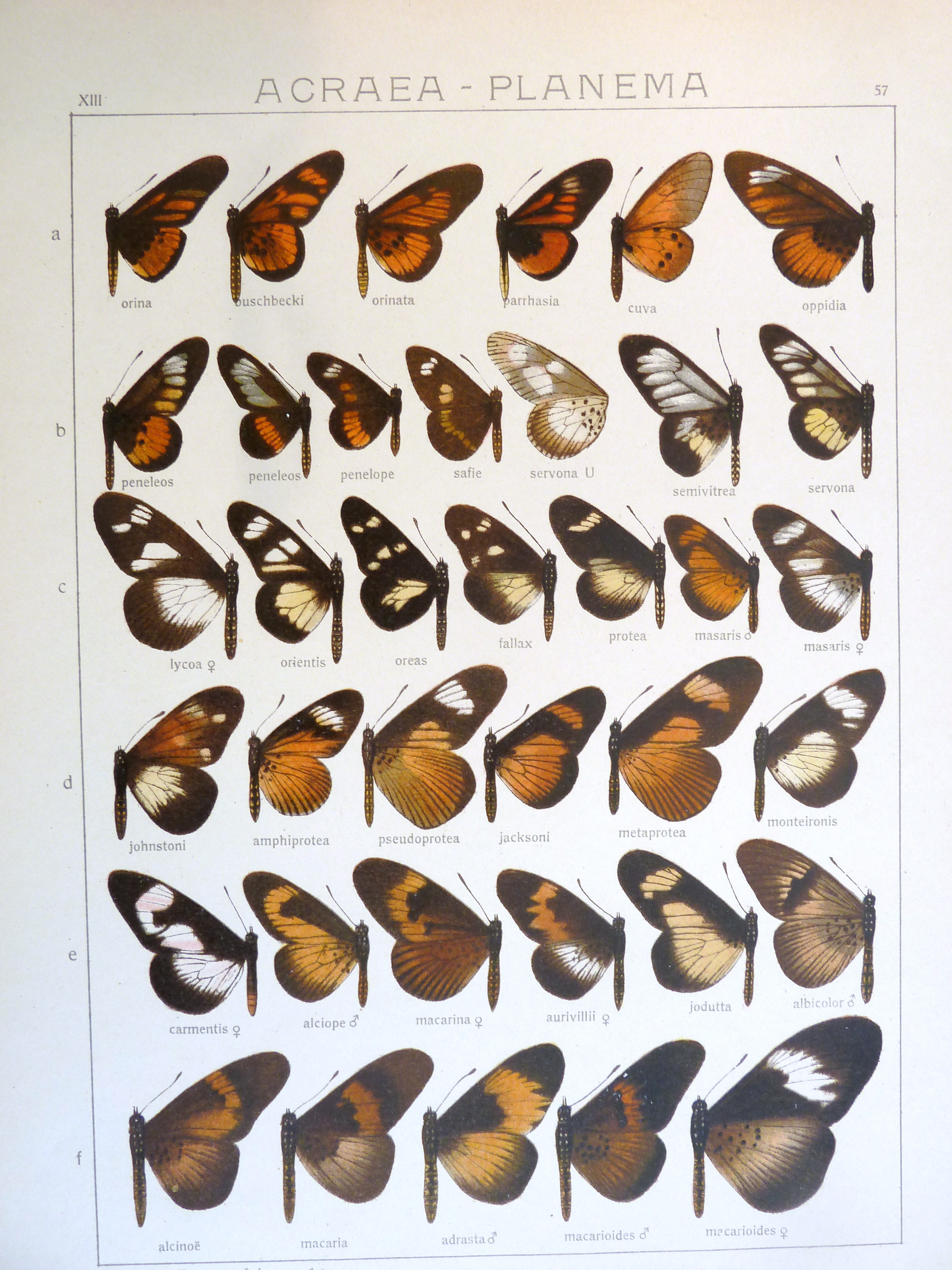
- In Adalbert Seitz's Fauna Africana

Scientific classification
- Kingdom: Animalia
- Phylum: Arthropoda
- Clade: Pancrustacea
- Class: Insecta
- Order: Lepidoptera
- Family: Nymphalidae
- Genus: Bematistes
- Species: B. macaria

Binomial name
- Bematistes macaria (Fabricius, 1793)

Synonyms
- Papilio macaria Fabricius, 1793; Acraea macaria (Fabricius, 1793); Acraea (Acraea) macaria

= Bematistes macaria =

Species of butterfly

Acraea macaria, formerly Bematistes macaria, the black-spot bematistes, is a species of butterfly in the family Nymphalidae. It is found in Senegal, Guinea, Sierra Leone, Liberia, Ivory Coast and Ghana.

== Description ==
P. macaria F. (57 ). The spots of the transverse band of the fore wing in cellules 1 b and 2 are deeply incised distally or occasionally quite cleft; the hindwing above at the base as far as the apex of the cell dark brown to blackish, then with a distinct light yellowish (male) or white (female) median band. In the male the upperside of the forewing is nearly black in the basal part as far as the transverse band; hence the dark yellow transverse band, which is about 7 mm. in breadth, is sharply defined basally; it forms in the apex of the cell an irregular spot, which usually encloses a rounded spot of the ground-colour. In the female the white transverse band of the fore wing completely fills up the base of cellule 3 and occasionally also forms 1 or 2 spots in the cell; it may be best distinguished from the female of [related] species by having the white median band of the hindwing very distinct, rectilinear and very sharply defined against the dark basal area. Sierra Leone.

Torben Larsen developed a species numbering system for his 2005 publication Butterflies of West Africa. This species is #1189. The 'Larsen' numbers have since been used with permission in A Sharp Eye on Butterflies of Ghana.

== Biology ==
The habitat consists of wetter forests.

The larvae feed on Adenia species.

== Taxonomy ==
See Pierre & Bernaud, 2014
