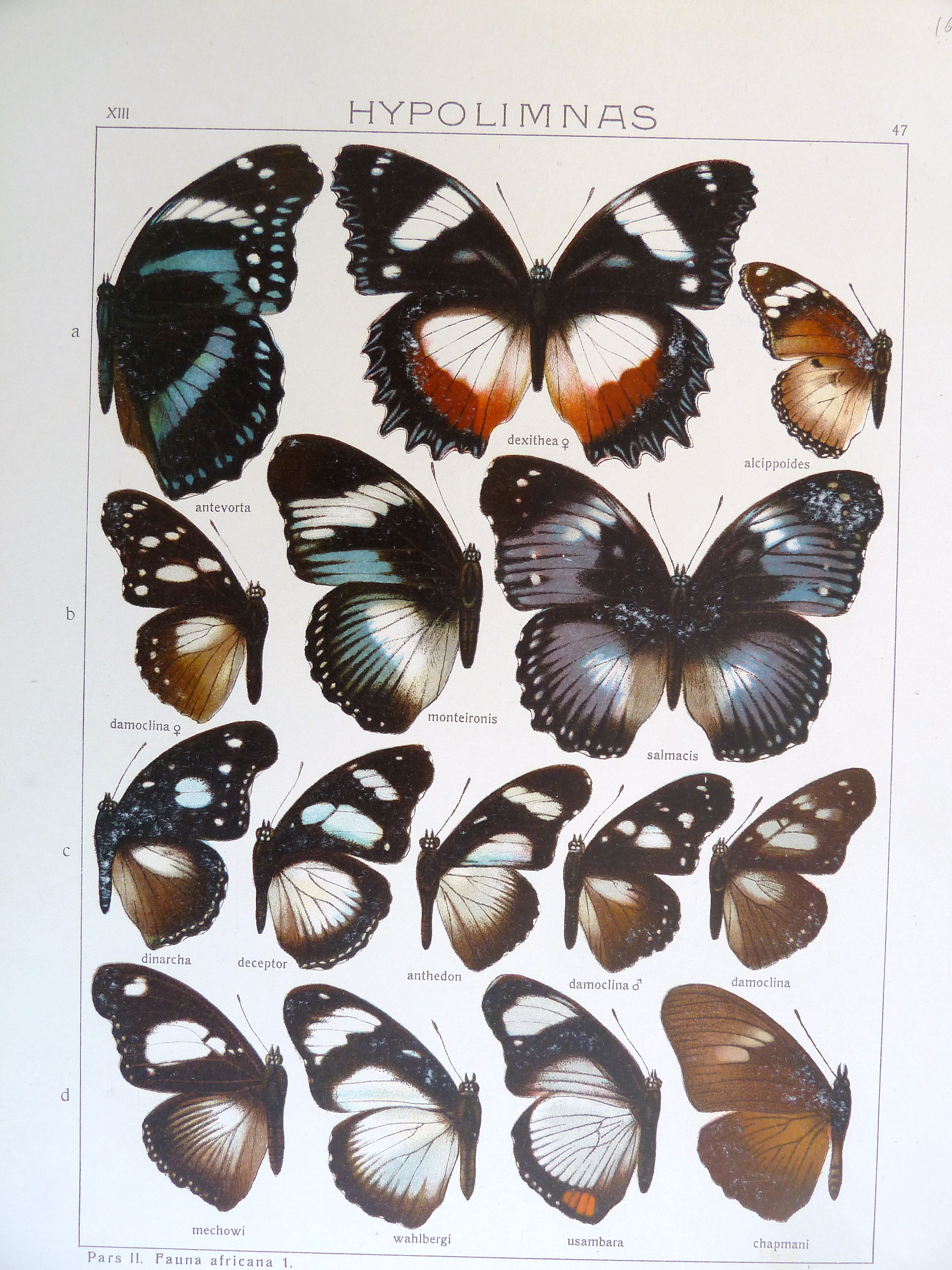
- In Adalbert Seitz's Fauna Africana

Scientific classification
- Domain: Eukaryota
- Kingdom: Animalia
- Phylum: Arthropoda
- Class: Insecta
- Order: Lepidoptera
- Family: Nymphalidae
- Genus: Hypolimnas
- Species: H. chapmani

Binomial name
- Hypolimnas chapmani (Hewitson, 1873)

Synonyms
- Diadema chapmani Hewitson, 1873; Hypolimnas chapmani ab. fasciata Aurivillius, 1894

= Hypolimnas chapmani =

Chapman's eggfly

Species of butterfly

Hypolimnas chapmani, the Chapman's eggfly, is a butterfly in the family Nymphalidae. It is found in eastern Nigeria and Cameroon. The habitat consists of primary forests.

Adults are probably mimics of Acraea umbra.
