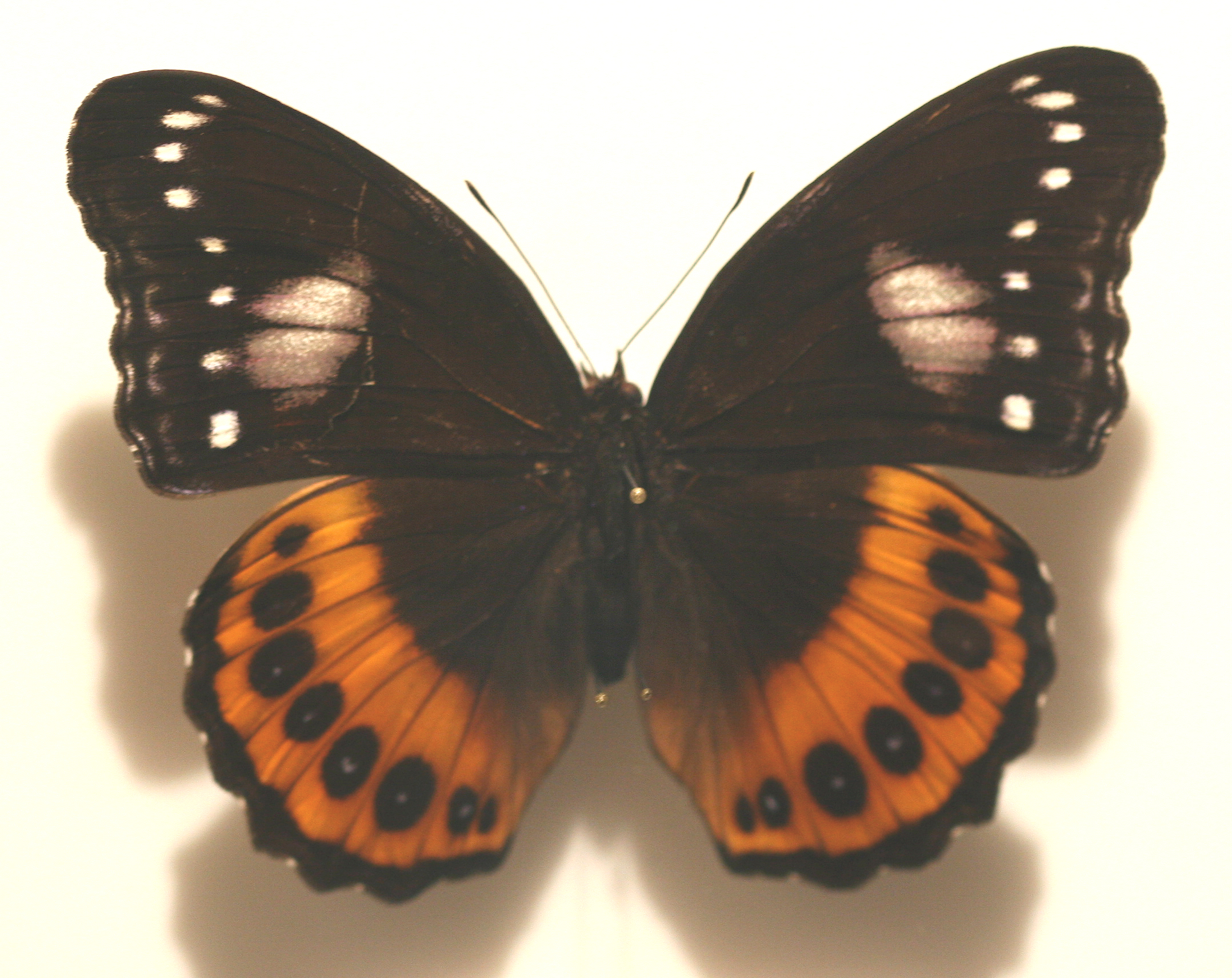
- Male
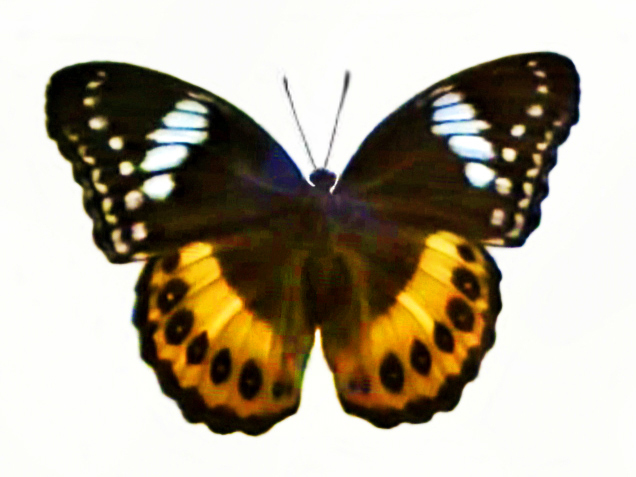
- Female

Scientific classification
- Kingdom: Animalia
- Phylum: Arthropoda
- Class: Insecta
- Order: Lepidoptera
- Family: Nymphalidae
- Genus: Hypolimnas
- Species: H. pandarus

Binomial name
- Hypolimnas pandarus (Linnaeus, 1758)

Synonyms
- Papilio pipleis Linnaeus, 1758; Papilio calisto Cramer, 1775; Papilio (Nymphalis) lacteolus Gmelin, 1788; Papilio triumphans Fruhstorfer, 1912

= Hypolimnas pandarus =

Species of butterfly

Hypolimnas pandarus is a butterfly in the family Nymphalidae. The species was first described by Carl Linnaeus in his 1758 10th edition of Systema Naturae.

== Distribution ==
This species is present in the Indonesia (Ambon Island, Serang, Saparua, Buru, Kai Islands).

== Subspecies ==
Subspecies include:

- Hypolimnas pandarus pandarus (Ambon Island, Serang, Saparua)
- Hypolimnas pandarus pandora (Wallace, 1869) (Buru)
- Hypolimnas pandarus hewitsoni Wallace, 1869 (Kai Islands)

== Description ==
Hypolimnas pandarus can reach a wingspan of about 80 mm (3.1 in). In males, the forewings are dark brown, usually with a few white, yellow or blue spots, depending on the subspecies, while the female has a band across the upper wings either creamy white or pale rufous. The posterior margin of the hindwings is deeply scalloped and shows a broad rufous-orange band, with several brown or black oval spots. In some subspecies is also present a pink purple patch.
