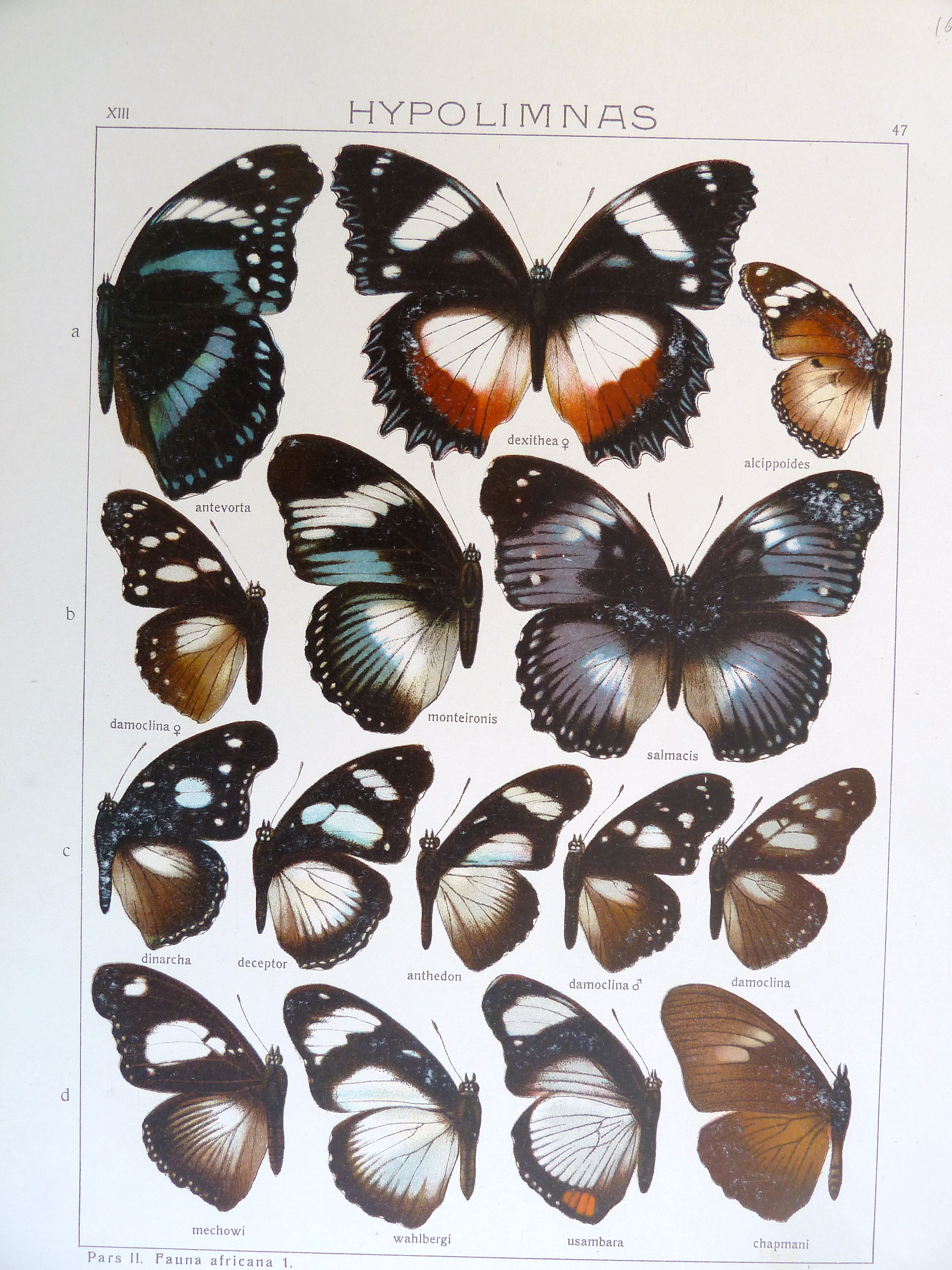
- In Adalbert Seitz's Fauna Africana

Scientific classification
- Domain: Eukaryota
- Kingdom: Animalia
- Phylum: Arthropoda
- Class: Insecta
- Order: Lepidoptera
- Family: Nymphalidae
- Genus: Hypolimnas
- Species: H. mechowi

Binomial name
- Hypolimnas mechowi (Dewitz, 1884)

Synonyms
- Diadema mechowi Dewitz, 1884; Diadema ragiens Capronnier, 1889; Hypolimnas stanleyi Grose-Smith, 1890; Hypolimnas mechovi f. paranarchadi Bernardi, 1959

= Hypolimnas mechowi =

Species of butterfly

Hypolimnas mechowi is a butterfly in the family Nymphalidae. It is found in Cameroon, the Republic of the Congo, the Central African Republic and the Democratic Republic of the Congo (Mongala, Uele, Ituri, Kivu, Tshopo, Equateur, Sankuru).
