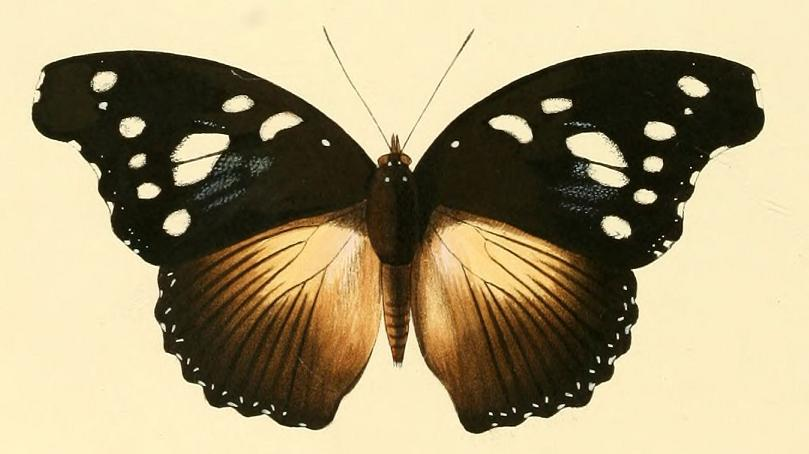

Scientific classification
- Kingdom: Animalia
- Phylum: Arthropoda
- Clade: Pancrustacea
- Class: Insecta
- Order: Lepidoptera
- Family: Nymphalidae
- Genus: Hypolimnas
- Species: H. dinarcha

Binomial name
- Hypolimnas dinarcha (Hewitson, 1865)

Synonyms
- Diadema dinarcha Hewitson, 1865; Hypolimnas dinarcha narchadi Suffert, 1904; Hypolimnas dinarcha liberiensis Bernardi, 1959; Hypolimnas dinarcha f. antiope Stoneham, 1965; Hypolimnas dinarcha f. cytherea Stoneham, 1965

= Hypolimnas dinarcha =

Species of butterfly

Hypolimnas dinarcha, the large variable diadem or large variable eggfly, is a butterfly in the family Nymphalidae. It is found in Sierra Leone, Liberia, Ivory Coast, Ghana, Nigeria, Cameroon, Gabon, the Republic of the Congo, Angola, the Democratic Republic of the Congo, the Central African Republic, Uganda, Kenya and Tanzania. The habitat consists of heavy lowland forests and secondary forests with a closed canopy.

The larvae feed on Fleurya species.

== Subspecies ==
- Hypolimnas dinarcha dinarcha (Sierra Leone, Liberia, Ivory Coast, Ghana, Nigeria, Cameroon, Gabon, Congo, Angola: Cabinda, Democratic Republic of the Congo, Central African Republic)
- Hypolimnas dinarcha grandis Rothschild, 1918 (Uganda, western Kenya, north-western Tanzania)

Torben Larsen developed a species numbering system for his 2005 publication Butterflies of West Africa. The nominate subspecies is #803. The 'Larsen' numbers have since been used with permission in A Sharp Eye on Butterflies of Ghana.
