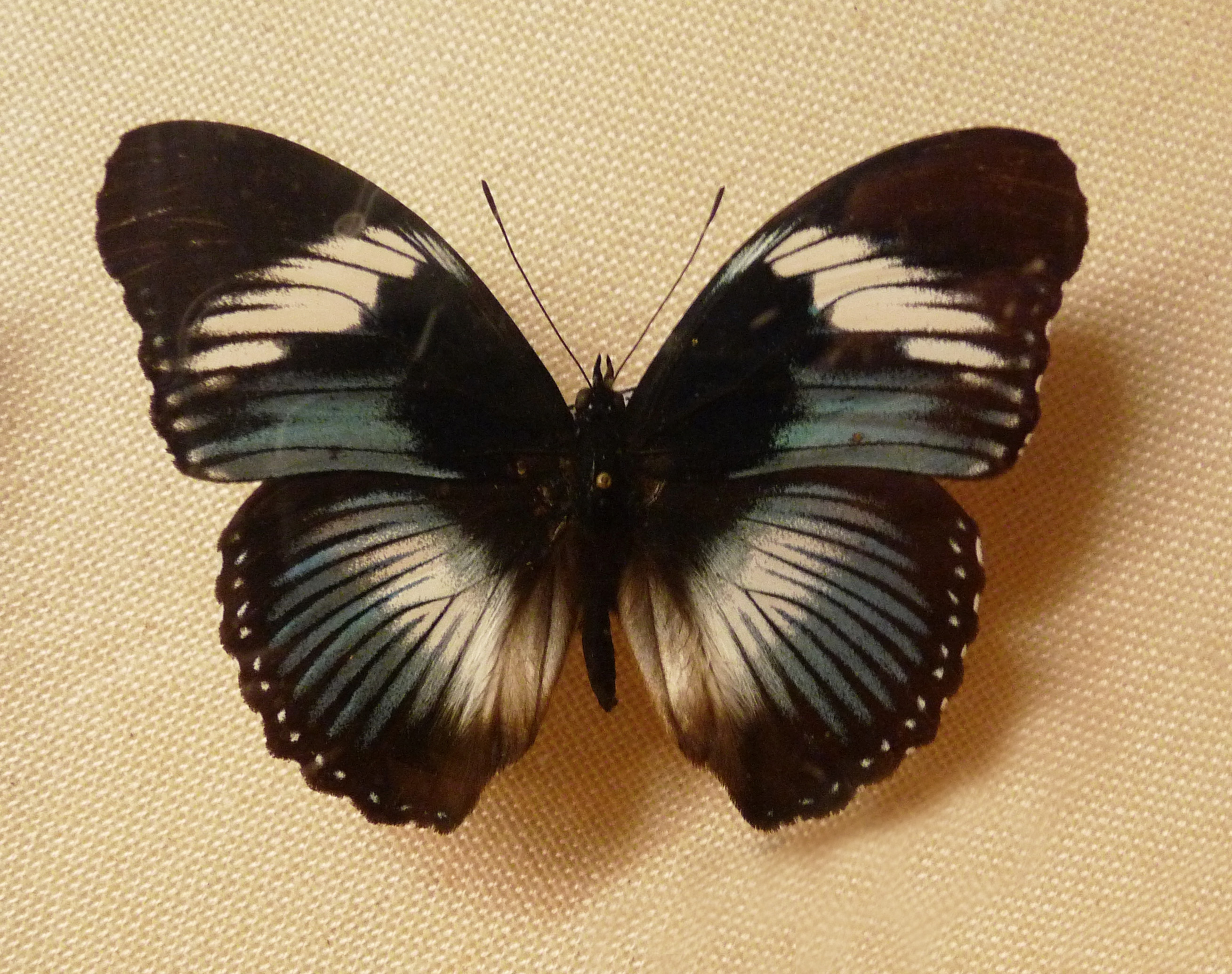
- Male
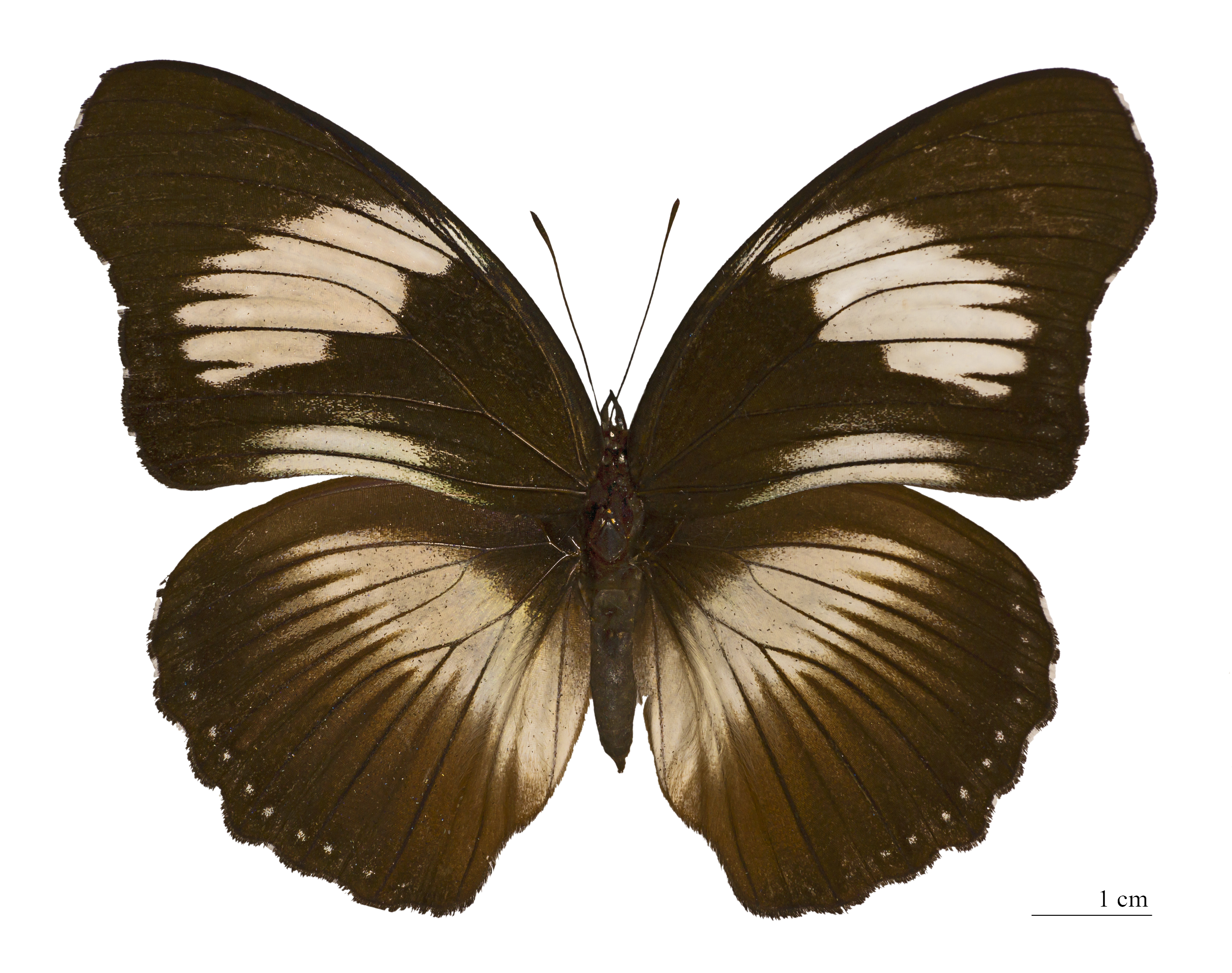
- Female

Scientific classification
- Domain: Eukaryota
- Kingdom: Animalia
- Phylum: Arthropoda
- Class: Insecta
- Order: Lepidoptera
- Family: Nymphalidae
- Genus: Hypolimnas
- Species: H. monteironis

Binomial name
- Hypolimnas monteironis (H. Druce, 1874)

Subspecies
- H. m. monteironis; H. m. major

Synonyms
- Diadema monteironis H. Druce, 1874

= Hypolimnas monteironis =

Species of butterfly

Hypolimnas monteironis, the black-tipped diadem or scarce blue diadem, is a butterfly in the family Nymphalidae. The species was first described by Herbert Druce in 1874. It is found in Nigeria, Cameroon, Gabon, the Republic of the Congo, Angola, the Democratic Republic of the Congo, Uganda, Kenya and Tanzania. The habitat consists of forests.

The larvae feed on Urera hypselodendron and Fleurya species.

== Subspecies ==
- Hypolimnas monteironis monteironis (Nigeria, Cameroon, Gabon, Congo, Angola, Democratic Republic of the Congo)
- Hypolimnas monteironis major Rothschild, 1918 (Uganda, western Kenya, north-western Tanzania)
