= Hypolimnas macarthuri =

Scientific classification
- Domain: Eukaryota
- Kingdom: Animalia
- Phylum: Arthropoda
- Class: Insecta
- Order: Lepidoptera
- Family: Nymphalidae
- Genus: Hypolimnas
- Species: H. macarthuri

Binomial name
- Hypolimnas macarthuri Neidhoefer, 1972

Species of butterfly

Hypolimnas macarthuri is a butterfly in the family Nymphalidae. It is found in the Central African Republic.
