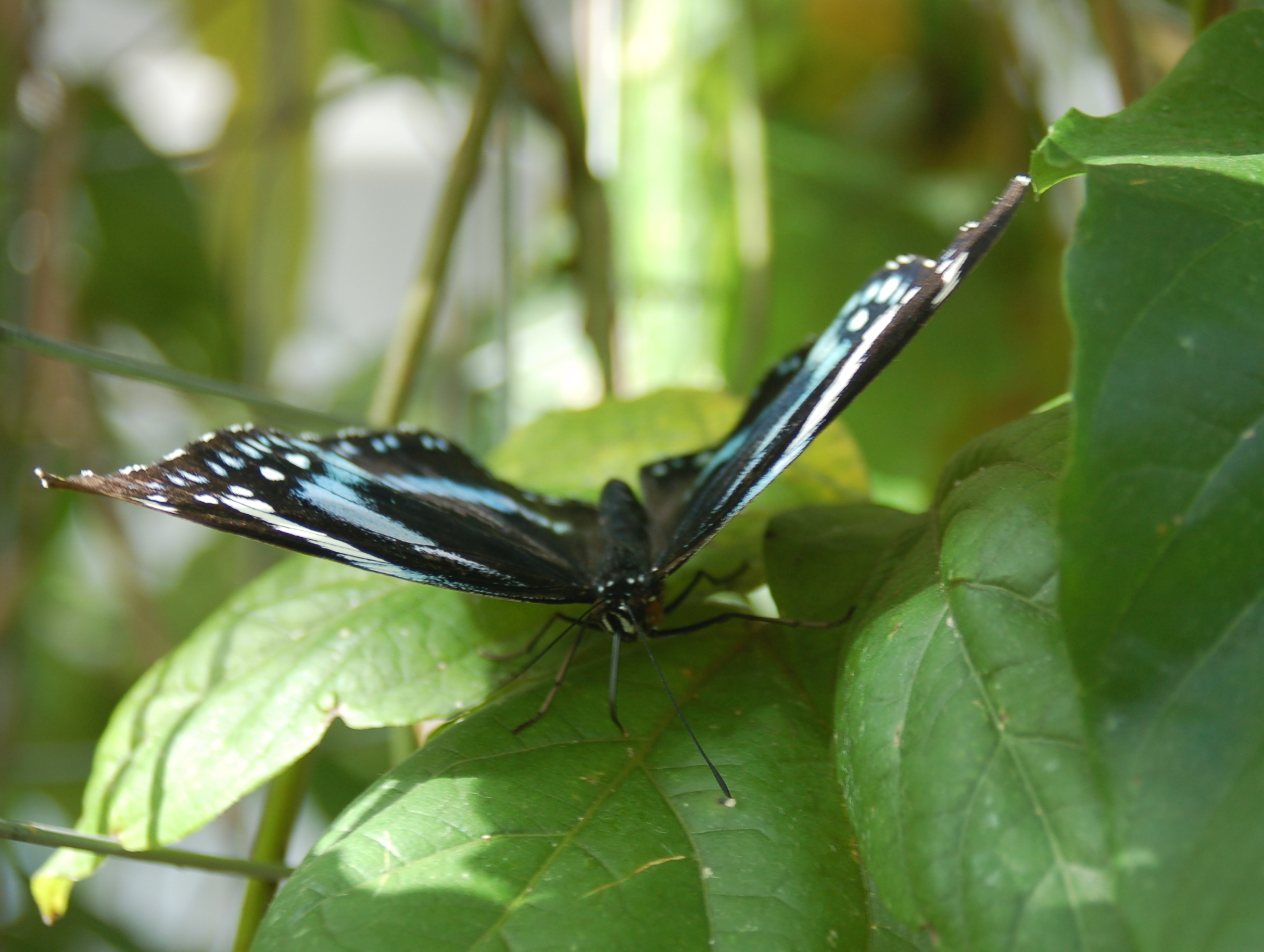

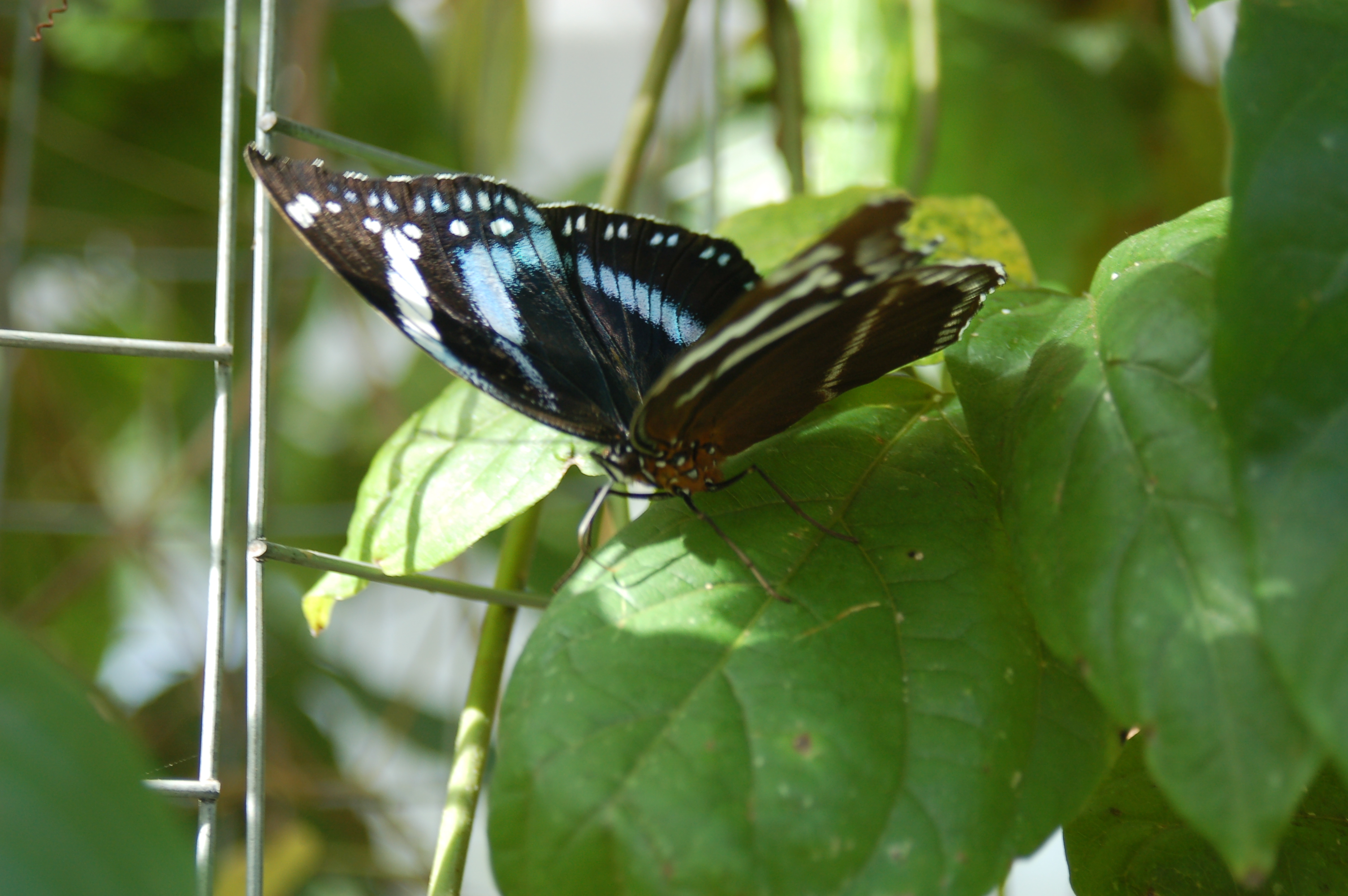

Scientific classification
- Kingdom: Animalia
- Phylum: Arthropoda
- Class: Insecta
- Order: Lepidoptera
- Family: Nymphalidae
- Genus: Hypolimnas
- Species: H. antevorta

Binomial name
- Hypolimnas antevorta (Distant, 1880)

Synonyms
- Diadema antevorta Distant, 1880

= Hypolimnas antevorta =

Species of butterfly

Hypolimnas antevorta is a butterfly in the family Nymphalidae. It is found in north-eastern Tanzania. The habitat consists of sub-montane forests at altitudes of about 1,000 m (3,300 ft).

The larvae feed on Urera species, including U. hypselodendron.
