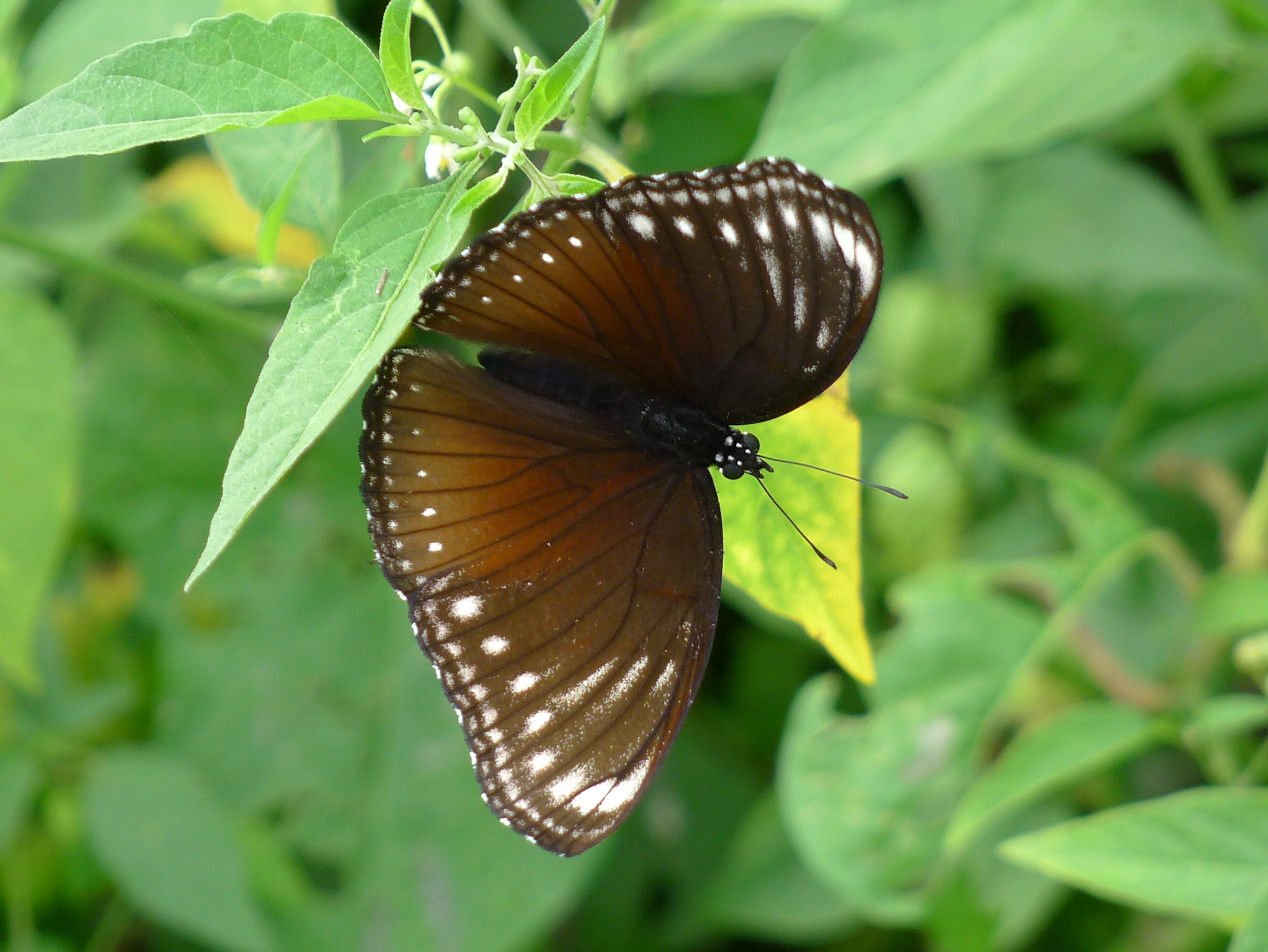
- Hypolimnas anomala. Dorsal view
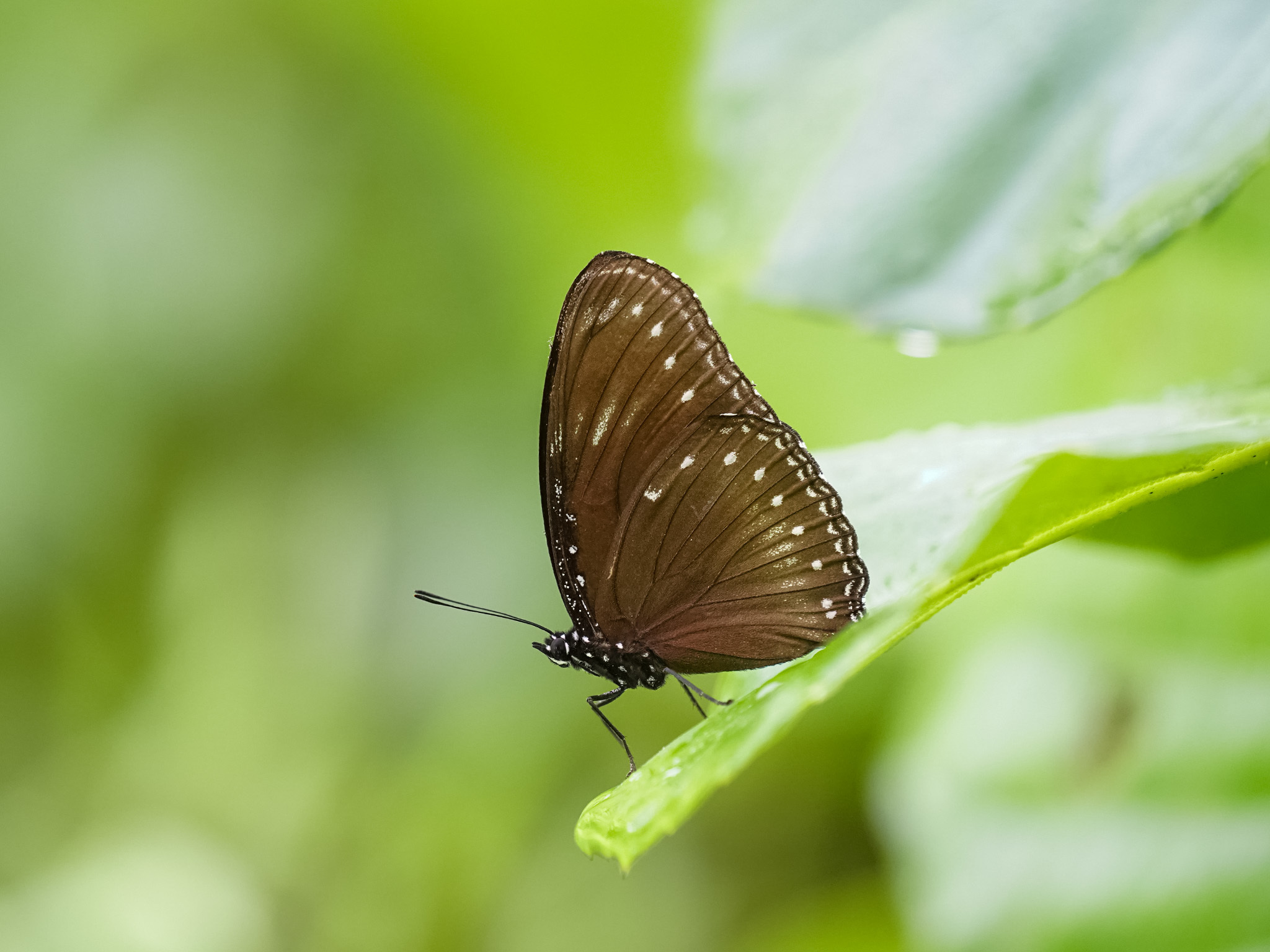
- Side view

Scientific classification
- Kingdom: Animalia
- Phylum: Arthropoda
- Class: Insecta
- Order: Lepidoptera
- Family: Nymphalidae
- Genus: Hypolimnas
- Species: H. anomala

Binomial name
- Hypolimnas anomala (Wallace, 1869)

Synonyms
- Diadema anomala Wallace, 1869; Hypolimnas nivas Fruhstorfer, 1912; Hypolimnas discandra Weymer, 1885; Hypolimnas antilope arnoldi Fruhstorfer, 1903; Diadema insterstincta Butler, 1873; Diadema wallaceana Butler, 1873; Hypolimnas sumbawana Pagenstecher, 1898; Hypolimnata anomala stellata Fruhstorfer, 1912

= Hypolimnas anomala =

Species of butterfly

Hypolimnas anomala, commonly known as the Malayan eggfly or crow eggfly, is a species of eggfly butterfly.

== Subspecies ==
Subspecies include:

- Hypolimnas anomala anomala (southern Thailand, Peninsular Malaya, Singapore, Sumatra, Java, Borneo, Palawan, Philippines, Bali, Lombok, Enggano, Bawean)
- Hypolimnas anomala arnoldi Fruhstorfer, 1903 (Kangean, Sumbawa, Flores)
- Hypolimnas anomala discandra Weymer, 1885 (Nias)
- Hypolimnas anomala euvaristos Fruhstorfer, 1912 (Philippines: Mindanao)
- Hypolimnas anomala interstincta (Butler, 1873) (Borneo)
- Hypolimnas anomala stellata (Fruhstorfer, 1912) (Sulawesi, Buton, Kabaena, Bangai, Sula)
- Hypolimnas anomala sumbawana Pagenstecher, 1898 (Sumbawa)
- Hypolimnas anomala truentus Fruhstorfer, 1912 (Philippines: Luzon and possibly Babuyanes)
- Hypolimnas anomala wallaceana (Butler, 1873) (Sulawesi)

== Distribution and habitat ==
This species is present as various subspecies in Southeast Asia (Moluccas, New Guinea, Australia). It especially occurs in lowlands and tropical rainforests, wastelands, hill parks and natural reserves.

== Description ==
Hypolimnas anomala in Singapore. Video clip

Hypolimnas anomala can reach a wingspan of 65–75 mm (2.6–3.0 in). These butterflies have brown forewings with a purple sheen. They show variable white markings. Usually there are a double row of white marginal spots and three pale streaks on each forewing. The hindwings are rather paler, with dark brown veins. The undersides of both wings are similar to the uppersides. In the adult butterflies only four legs are present. These butterflies mimic Euploea species.

== Biology ==
Females lay gold-colored globular eggs in a large cluster on the underside of the leaves. They hatch after about 3–4 days. The 6th (and final) instar caterpillars are black with yellow spots and spines. Also, the head is yellow. with long black cephalic horns. They are gregarious and usually occur in large numbers.

They feed on leaves of Urticaceae (Pipturus argenteus, Pipturus arboresceus, Pouzolzia, Villebrunea species ) and Euphorbiaceae (Claoxylon).

== Bibliography ==
- Corbet AS, Pendlebury HM, and Eliot JN. 1992. The butterflies of the Malay Peninsula. Malayan Nature Society, Kuala Lumpur.
- Parsons M. 1999. The butterflies of Papua New Guinea: their systematics and biology. Academic Press, San Diego.
- Michael F. Braby, Butterflies of Australia, CSIRO Publishing, Melbourne 2000, vol. 2, pp. 566–567.

== Gallery ==
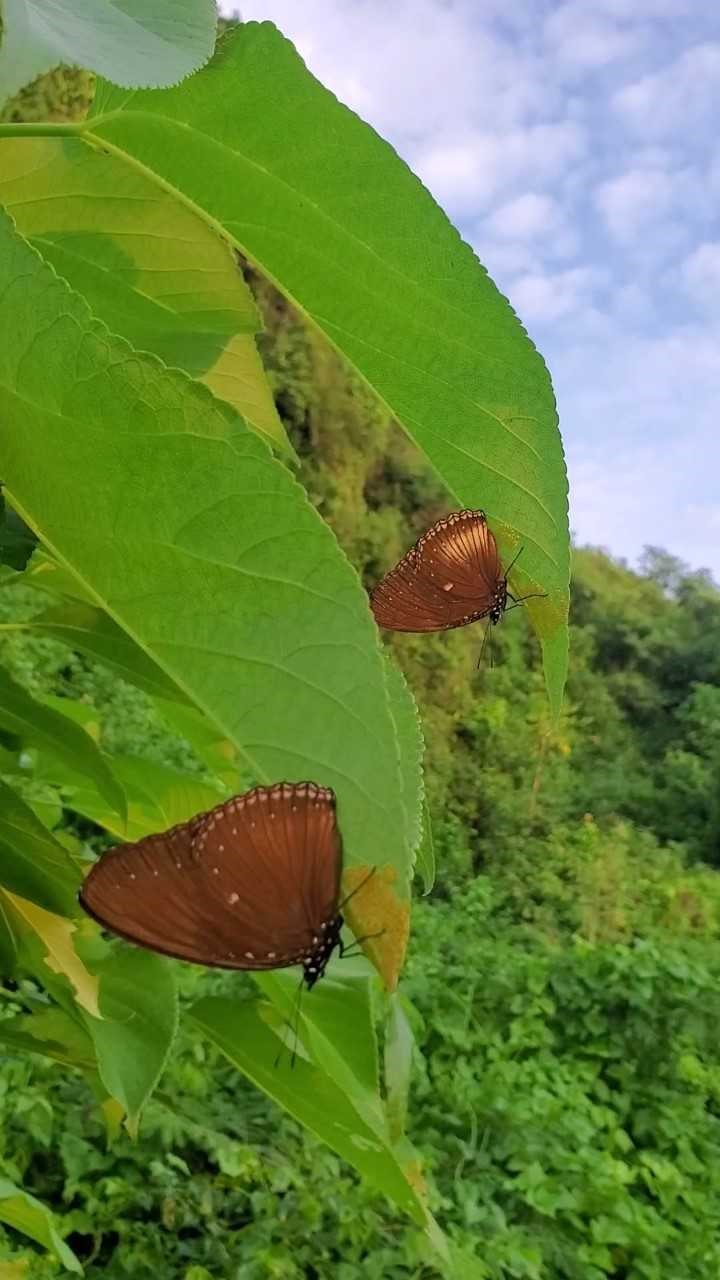
Guarding eggs on host plant, Pipturus argenteus. Tanguisson, Guam

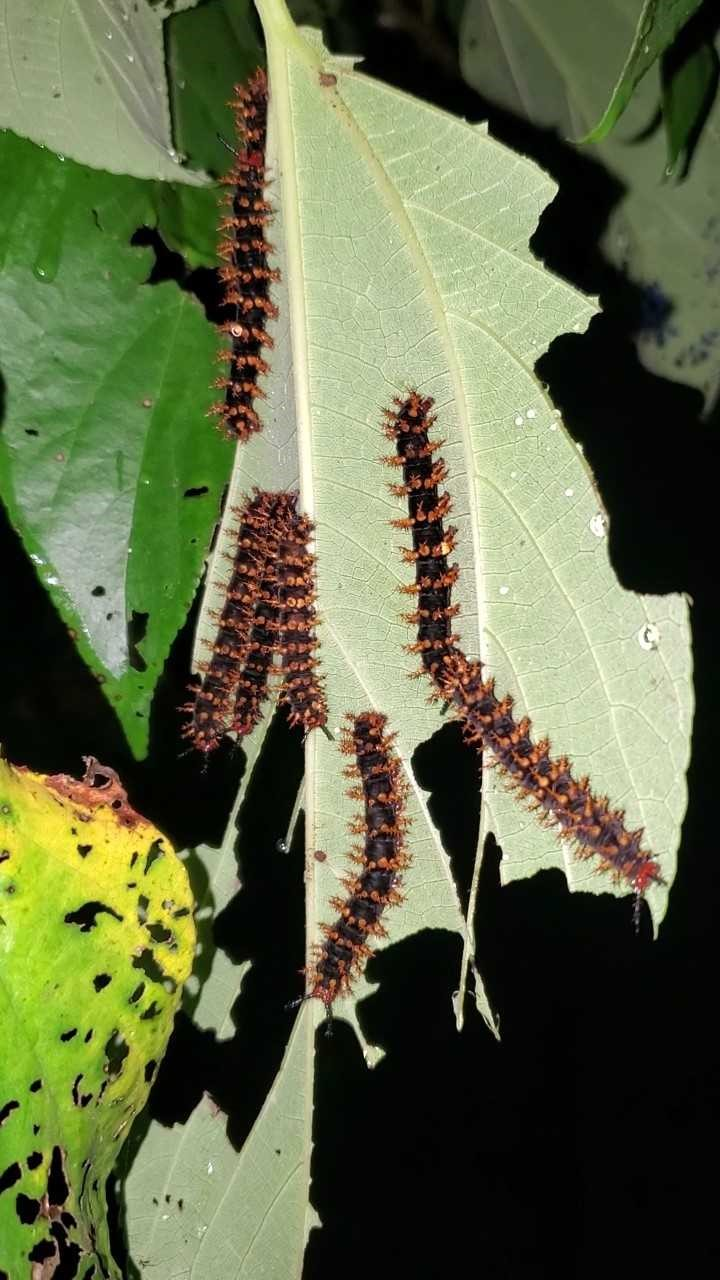
Caterpillars foraging host plant, Pipturus argentues. Tanguisson, Guam

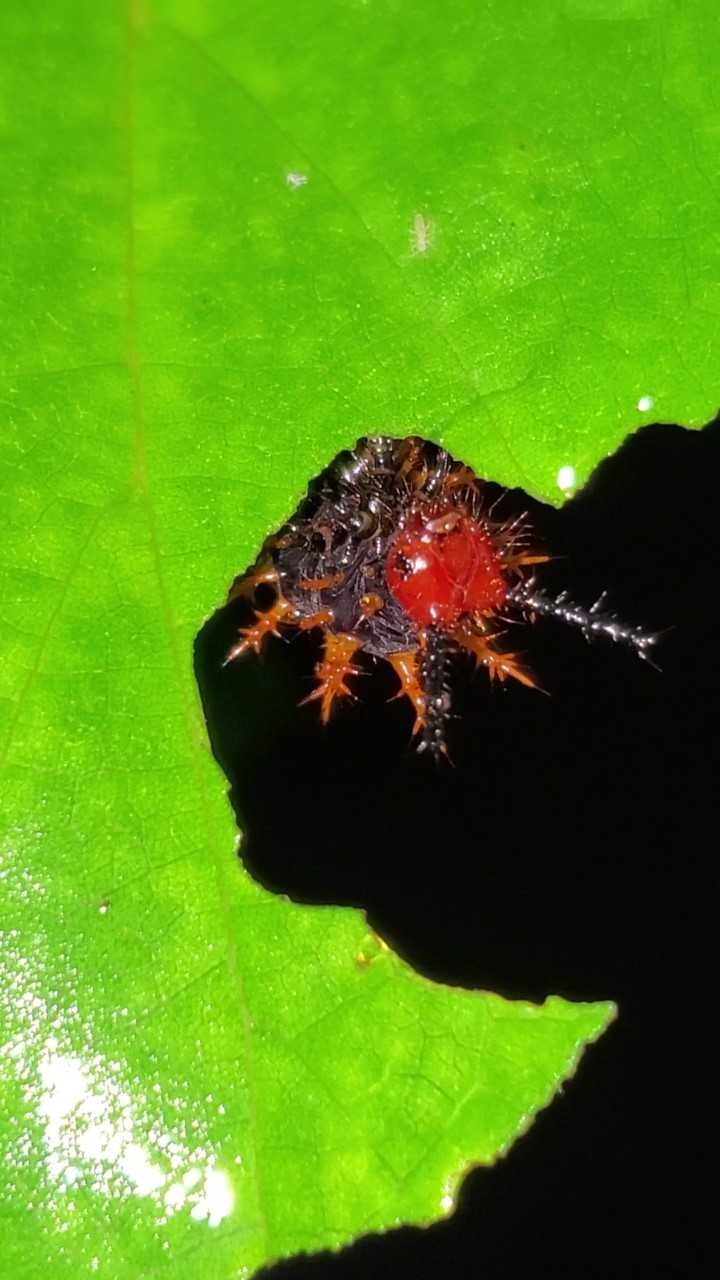
Caterpillar foraging on Pipturus argenteus leaf. Tanguisson, Guam

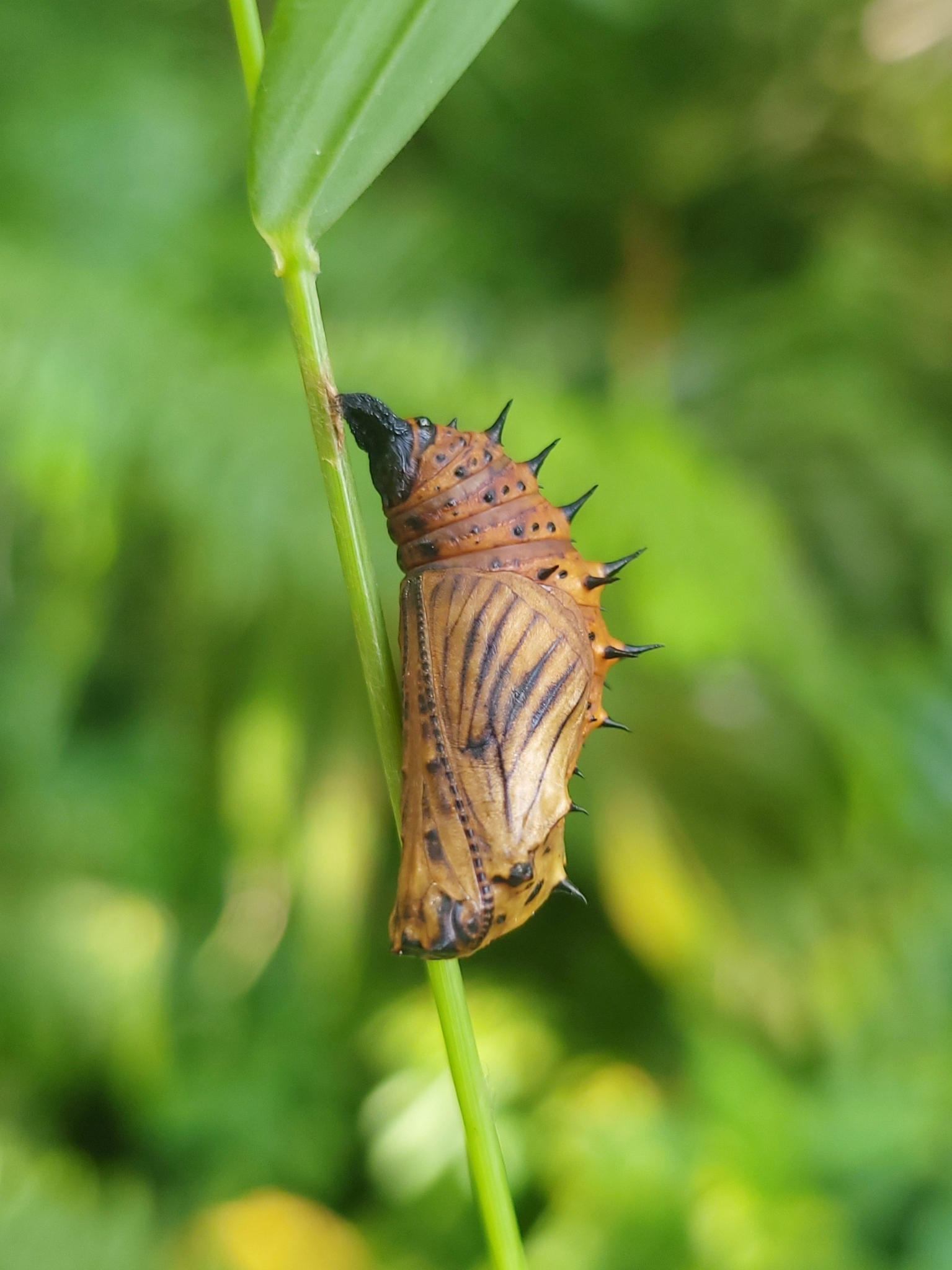
Chrysalis

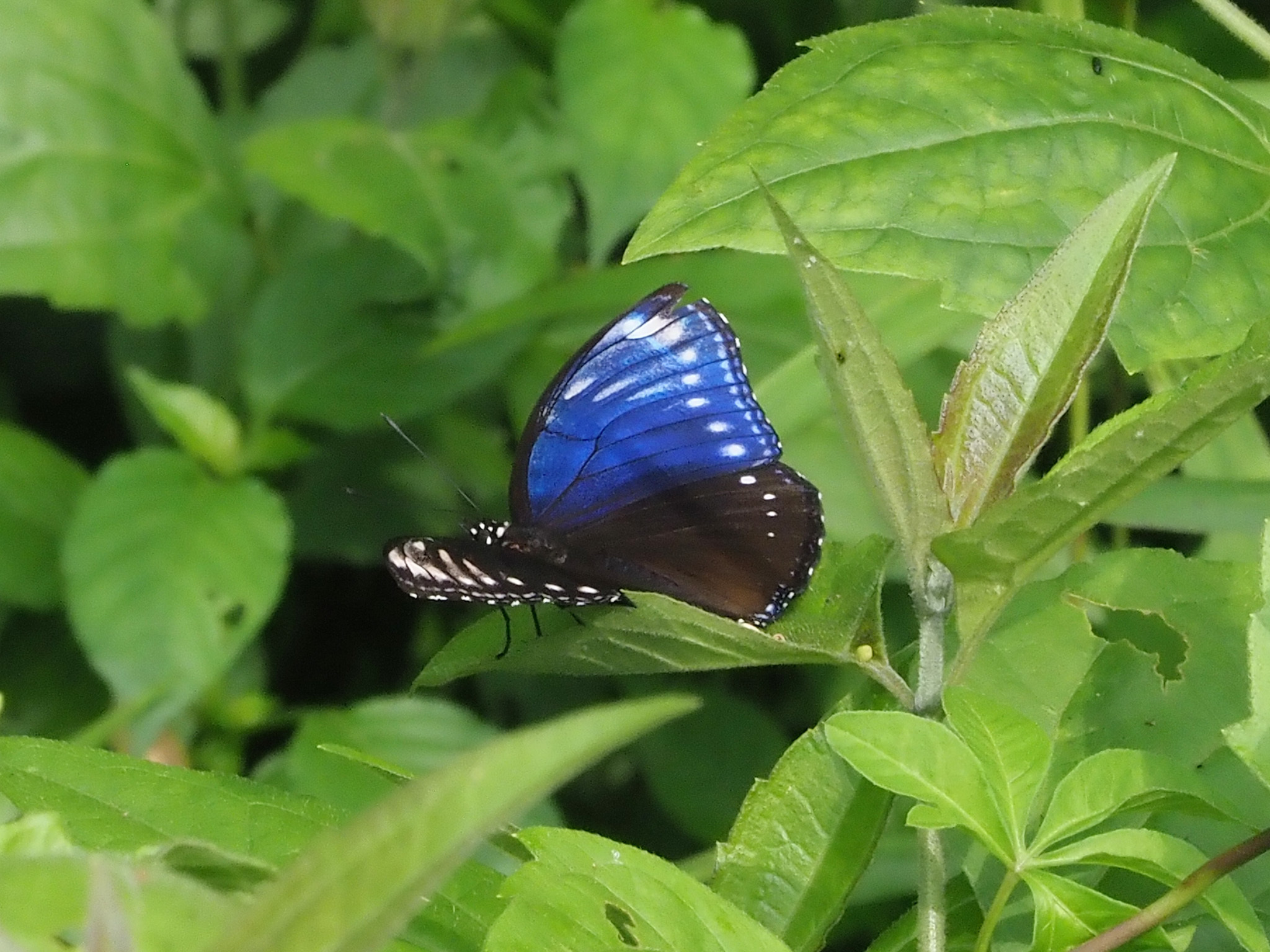
Dorsal view with blue wings

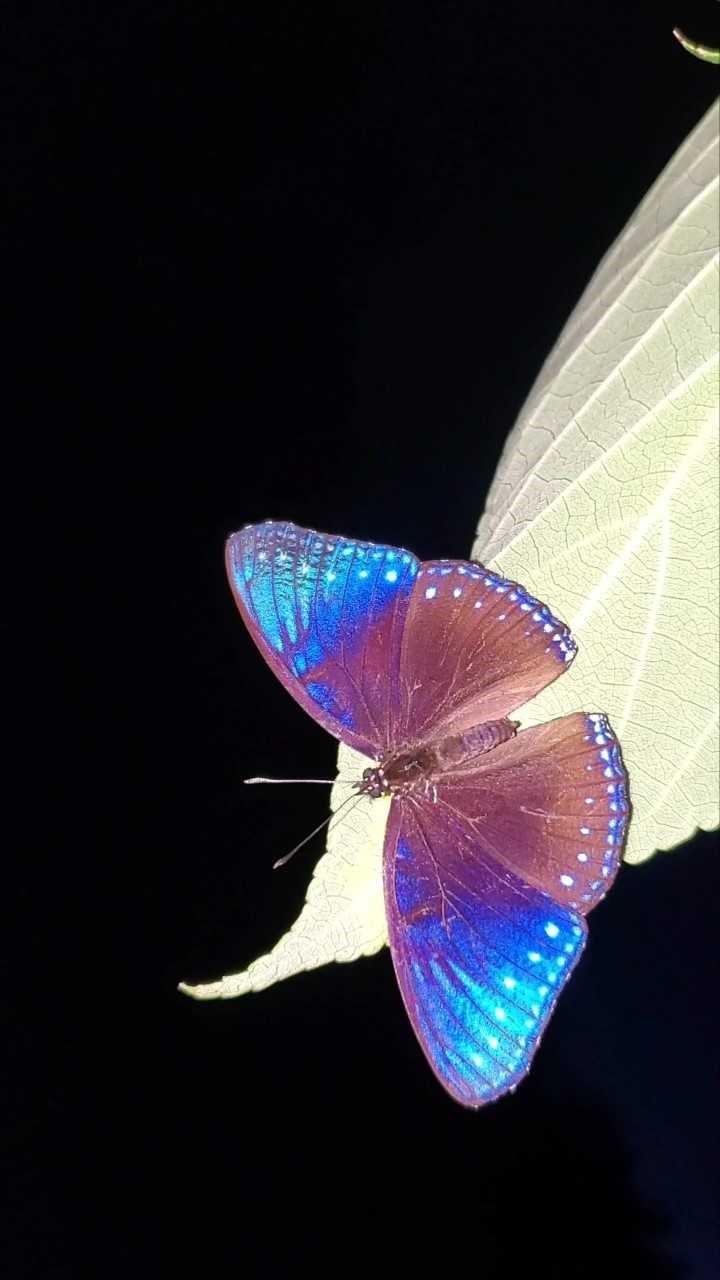
Dorsal view with blue wings. Tanguisson, Guam
