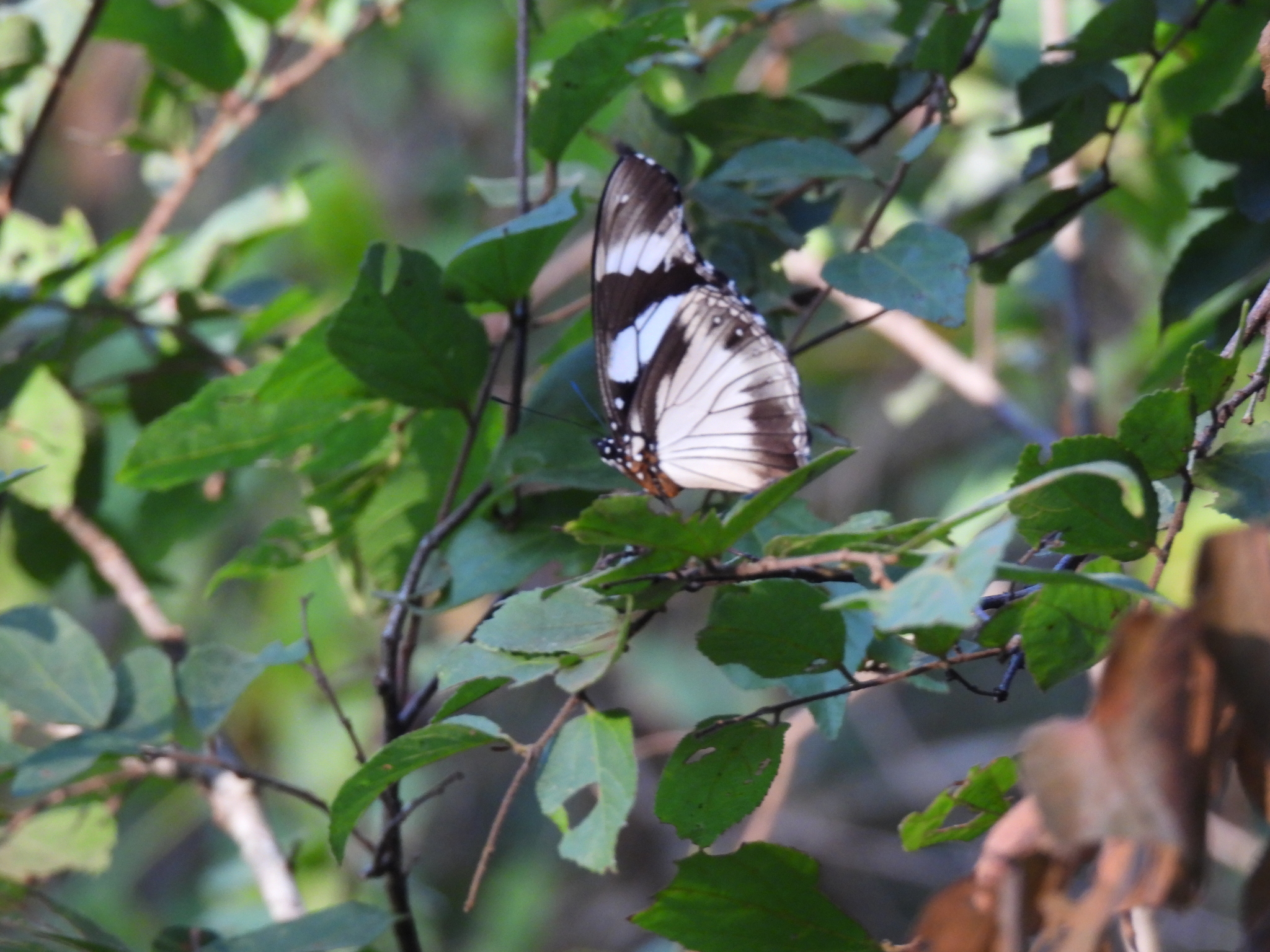

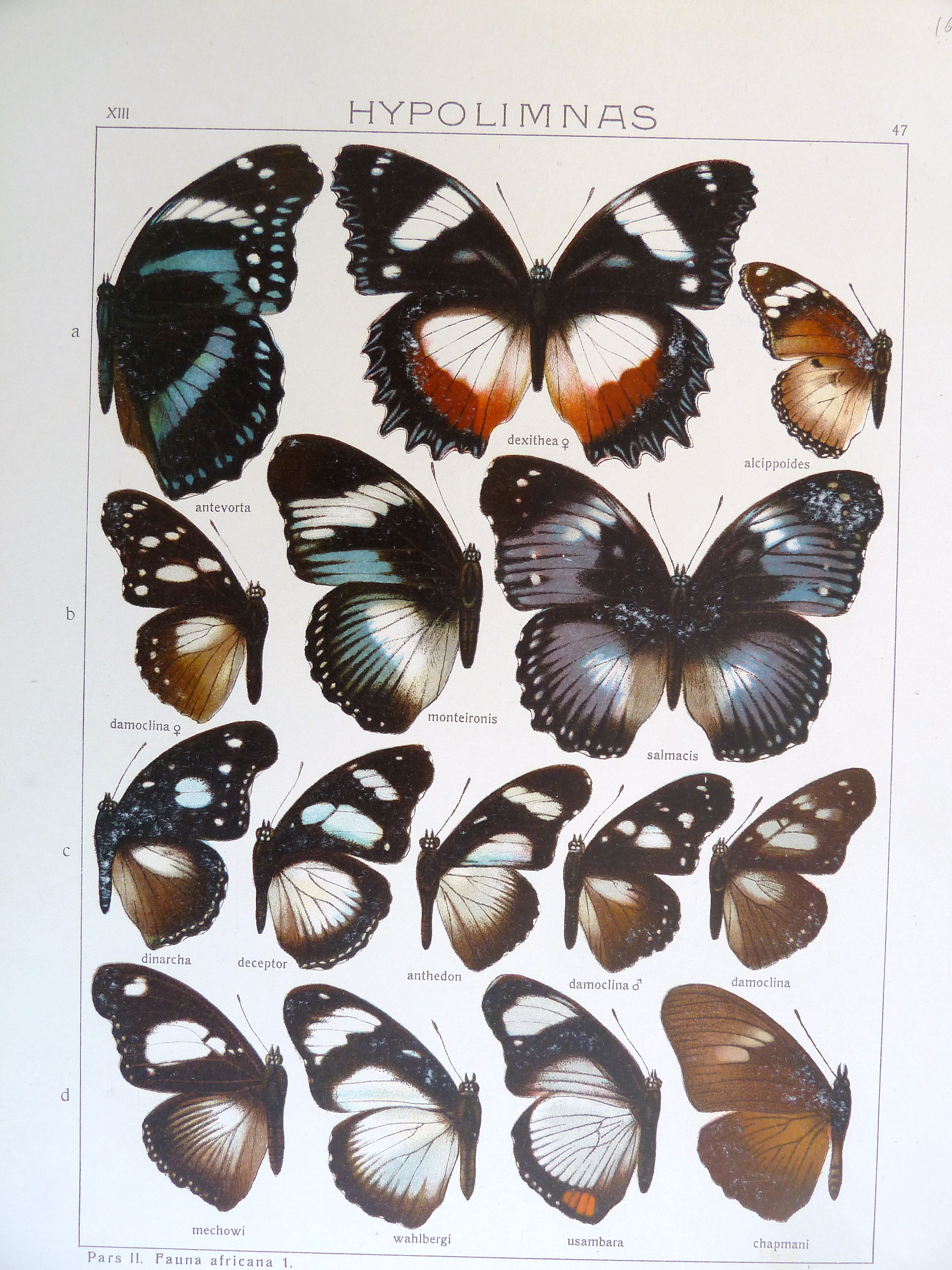
- In Adalbert Seitz's Fauna Africana

Conservation status
- Least Concern (IUCN 3.1)

Scientific classification
- Kingdom: Animalia
- Phylum: Arthropoda
- Class: Insecta
- Order: Lepidoptera
- Family: Nymphalidae
- Genus: Hypolimnas
- Species: H. deceptor

Binomial name
- Hypolimnas deceptor (Doubleday, 1845)

Synonyms
- Diadema deceptor Trimen, 1873; Euralia kirbyi Butler, 1898; Hypolimnas deludens Grose-Smith, 1891; Euralia grandidieri Mabille, 1899

= Hypolimnas deceptor =

Species of butterfly

Hypolimnas deceptor, the deceptive eggfly or deceptive diadem, is a species of Hypolimnas butterfly found in southern Africa.

Wingspan: 60–65 mm for males and 70–80 mm for females.

Flight period is year round, peaking in late summer.

Larval food is Fleurya capensis and Laportis peduncularis.

== Subspecies ==
- H. d. deceptor (southern Somalia, Kenya, Tanzania, Malawi, Mozambique, eastern Zimbabwe, South Africa: Limpopo, KwaZulu-Natal, Eastern Cape)
- H. d. deludens Grose-Smith, 1891 (central and south-western Madagascar)
