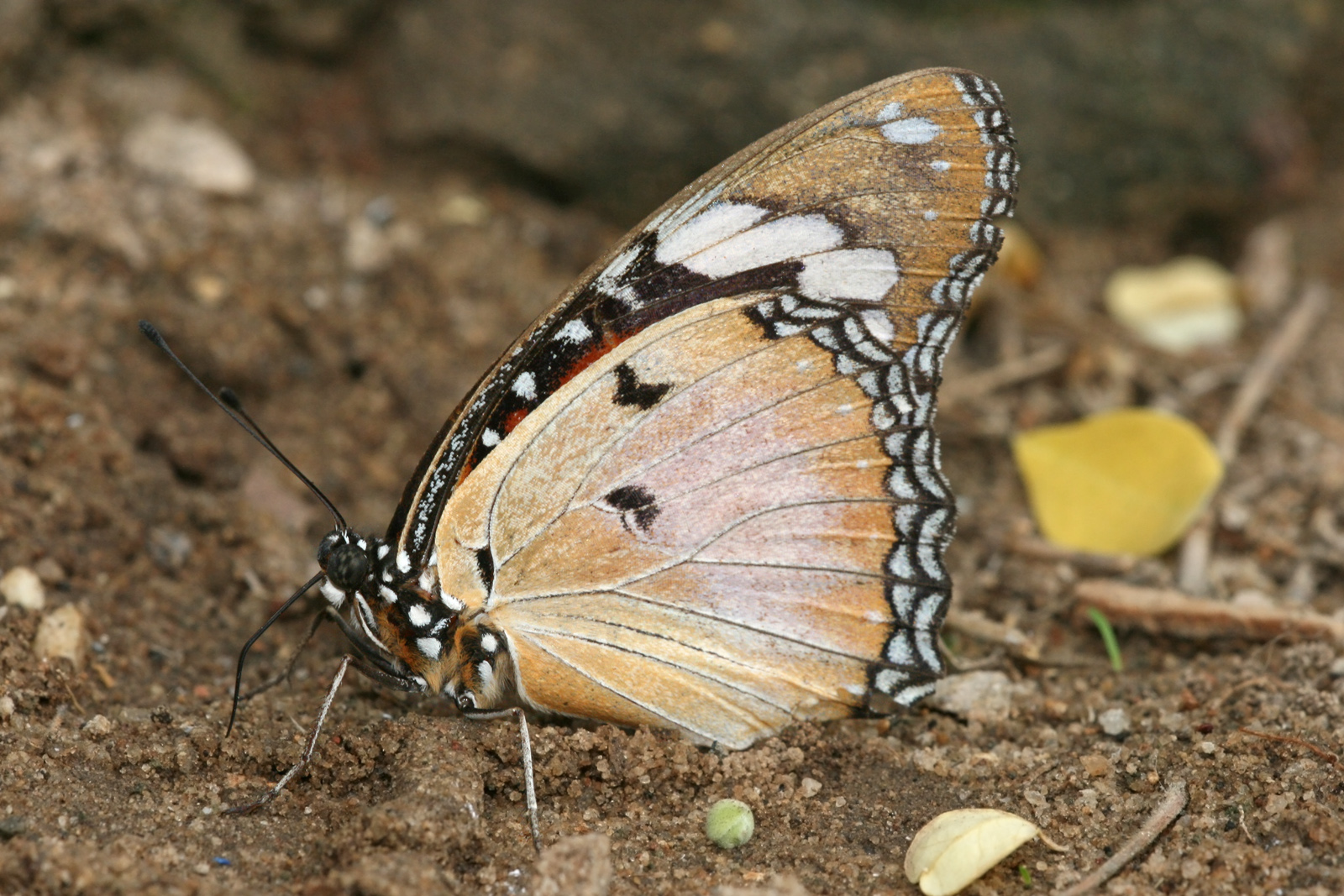
- Hypolimnas misippus
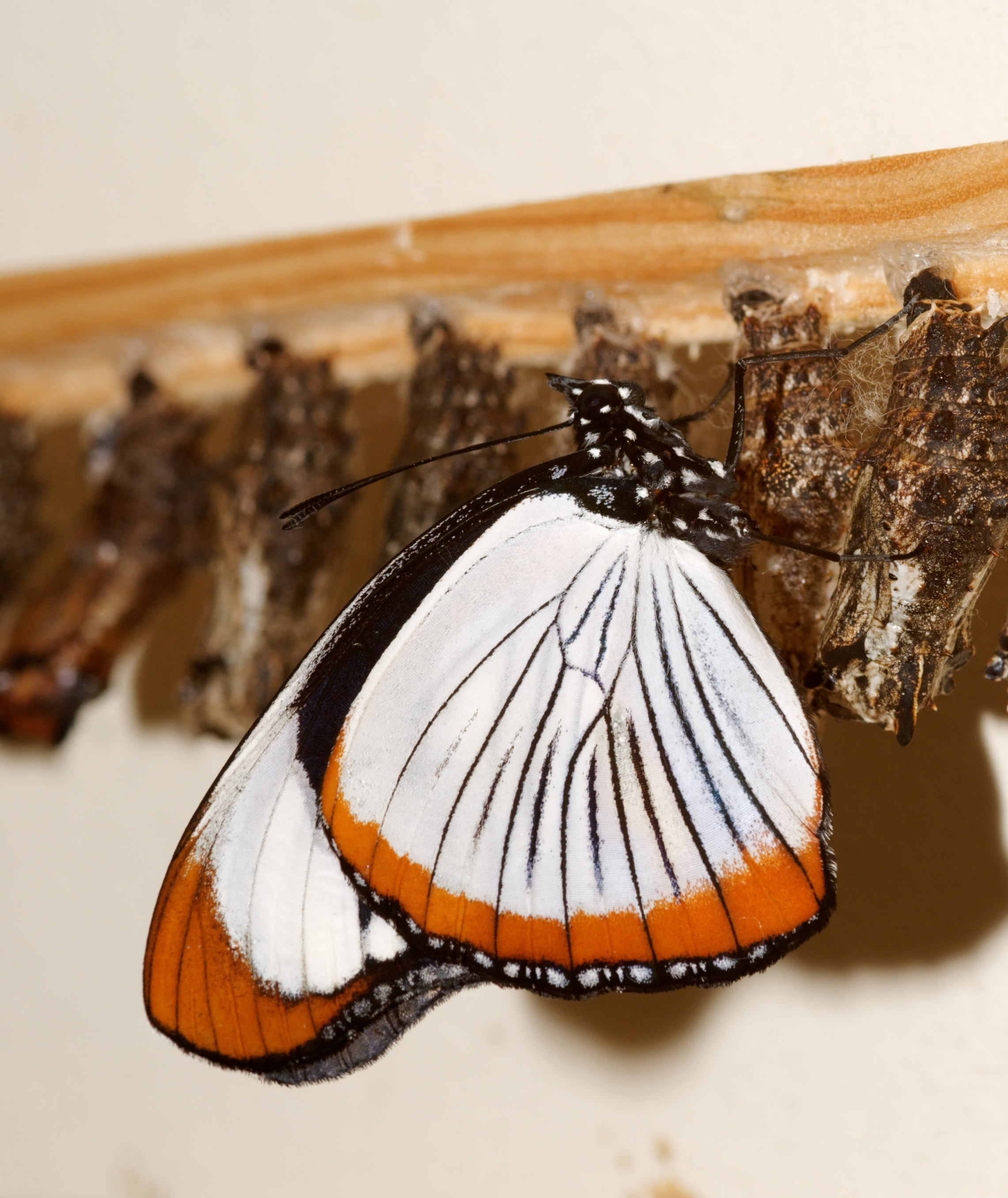
- Hypolimnas usambara

Scientific classification
- Kingdom: Animalia
- Phylum: Arthropoda
- Class: Insecta
- Order: Lepidoptera
- Family: Nymphalidae
- Tribe: Kallimini
- Genus: Hypolimnas; Hübner, [1819]

Species
- See text

Synonyms
- Esoptria Hübner, [1819]; Diadema Boisduval, 1832 (preocc. Gray, 1825); Euralia Westwood, [1850]; Eucalia Felder, 1861

= Hypolimnas =

Genus of butterflies

Hypolimnas is a genus of tropical brush-footed butterflies commonly known as eggflies or diadems. The genus contains approximately 23 species, most of which are found in Africa, Asia, and Oceania. One species, the Danaid eggfly (H. misippus), is noted for its exceptionally wide distribution across five continents; it is the only Hypolimnas species found in the Americas.

Eggflies are known for their marked sexual dimorphism and Batesian mimicry of poisonous milkweed butterflies (Danainae). For example, the Danaid eggfly mimics Danaus chrysippus while the great eggfly (H. bolina) mimics the Australian crow (Euploea core). In each case, the eggfly mimics the danainid's markings, thus adopting the latter's distasteful reputation to predators without being poisonous itself.

== Species ==
Listed alphabetically:

- Hypolimnas alimena (Linnaeus, 1758) – blue-banded eggfly
- Hypolimnas anomala (Wallace, 1869) – Malayan eggfly
- Hypolimnas antevorta (Distant, 1880)
- Hypolimnas anthedon (Doubleday, 1845) – variable eggfly or variable diadem
- Hypolimnas antilope (Cramer, [1777]) – spotted crow eggfly
- Hypolimnas aubergeri Hecq, 1987 – Côte d'Ivoire eggfly
- Hypolimnas aurifascia Mengel, 1903
- Hypolimnas bartelotti Grose-Smith, 1890
- Hypolimnas bolina (Linnaeus, 1758) – common eggfly or great eggfly
- Hypolimnas chapmani (Hewitson, 1873) – Chapman's eggfly
- Hypolimnas deceptor (Trimen, 1873) – deceptive eggfly
- Hypolimnas deois Hewitson, 1858
- Hypolimnas dexithea (Hewitson, 1863) – Madagascar diadem
- Hypolimnas dinarcha (Hewitson, 1865) – large variable diadem or large variable eggfly
- Hypolimnas diomea Hewitson, 1861
- Hypolimnas dimona Fruhstorfer, 1912
- Hypolimnas euploeoides Rothschild, 1915
- Hypolimnas fraterna Wallace, 1869
- Hypolimnas inopinata Waterhouse, 1920
- Hypolimnas macarthuri Neidhoefer, 1972
- Hypolimnas mechowi (Dewitz, 1884)
- Hypolimnas misippus (Linnaeus, 1764) – mimic, Danaid eggfly, or diadem
- Hypolimnas monteironis (Druce, 1874) – black-tipped diadem or scarce blue diadem
- Hypolimnas octocula Butler, 1869 – eight-spot diadem
- Hypolimnas pandarus (Linnaeus, 1758)
- Hypolimnas pithoeca Kirsch, 1877
- Hypolimnas salmacis (Druce, 1773) – blue diadem
- Hypolimnas saundersii (Hewitson, 1869)
- Hypolimnas usambara (Ward, 1872) – red spot diadem or Usambara diadem
