= Hypolimnas aubergeri =

Scientific classification
- Domain: Eukaryota
- Kingdom: Animalia
- Phylum: Arthropoda
- Class: Insecta
- Order: Lepidoptera
- Family: Nymphalidae
- Genus: Hypolimnas
- Species: H. aubergeri

Binomial name
- Hypolimnas aubergeri Hecq, 1987

Species of butterfly

Hypolimnas aubergeri, the Côte d'Ivoire eggfly, is a butterfly in the family Nymphalidae. It is found in Guinea (the Nimba Mountains), eastern and central Ivory Coast (French: Côte d'Ivoire) and possibly Ghana. The habitat consists of forests.
