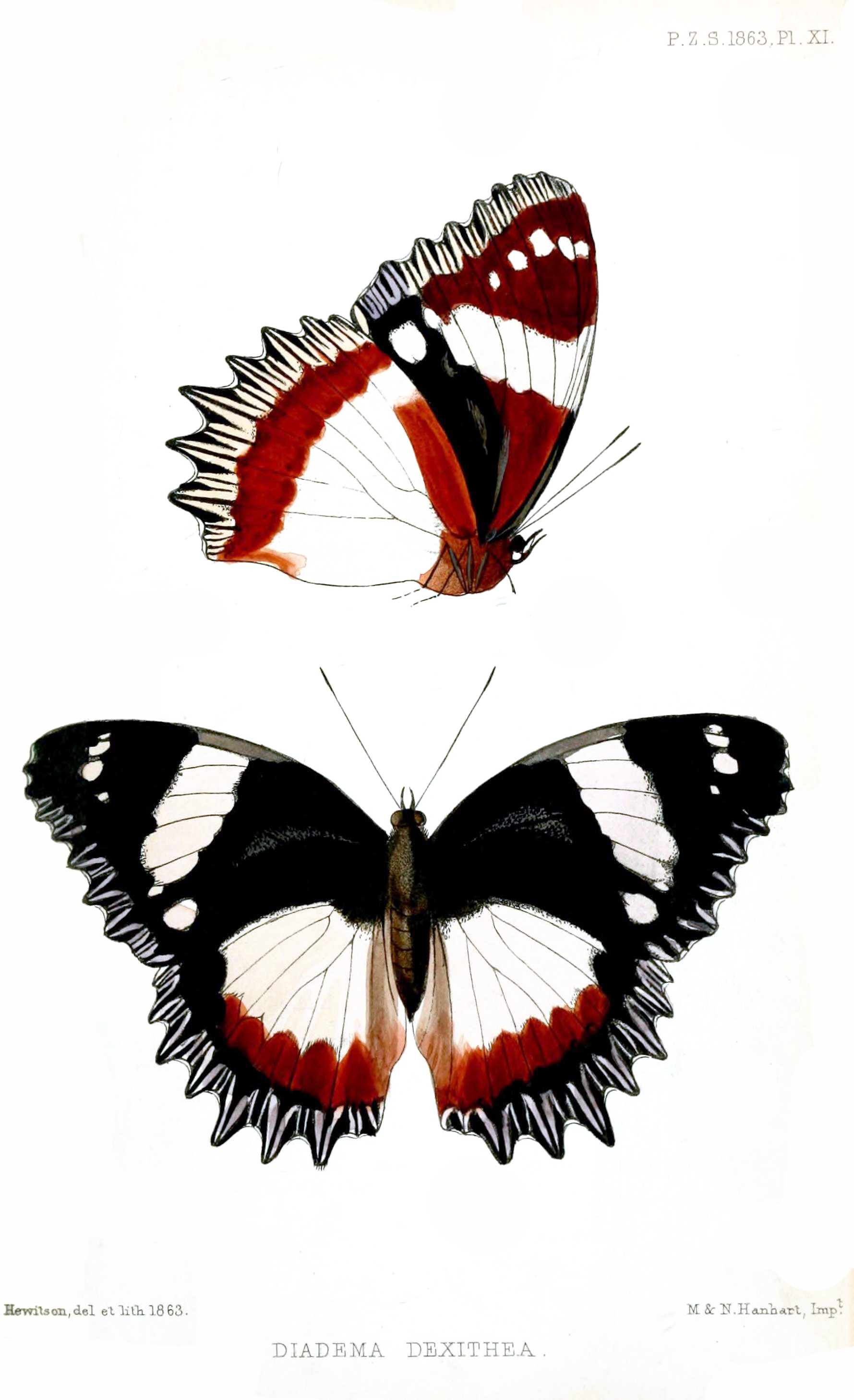

Scientific classification
- Kingdom: Animalia
- Phylum: Arthropoda
- Class: Insecta
- Order: Lepidoptera
- Family: Nymphalidae
- Genus: Hypolimnas
- Species: H. dexithea

Binomial name
- Hypolimnas dexithea (Hewitson, 1863)

Synonyms
- Diadema dexithea Hewitson, 1863; Diadema imperialis Guenée, 1865

= Hypolimnas dexithea =

Species of butterfly

Hypolimnas dexithea (Madagascar diadem) is a species of Hypolimnas butterfly endemic to Madagascar. The species was described in 1863 by William Chapman Hewitson from a specimen collected by J. Caldwell from Antananarivo in Madagascar. It later became one of the species targeted by collectors on account of its size and colour.

== Additional images ==
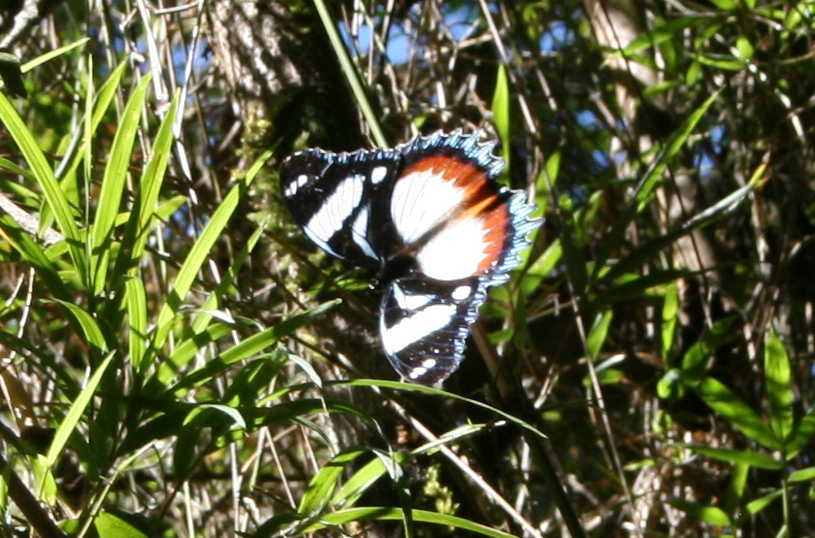
In Mantadia National Park
