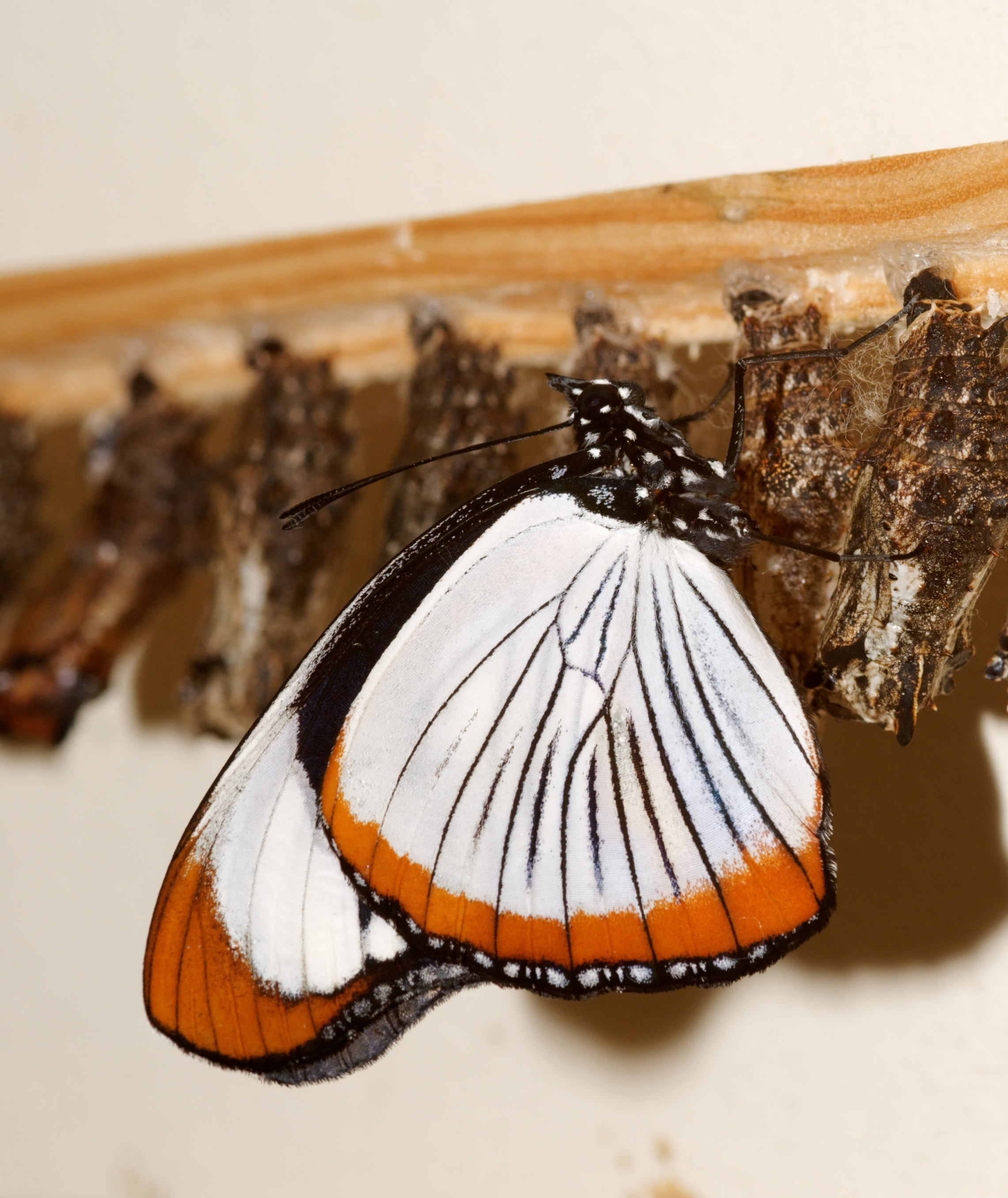

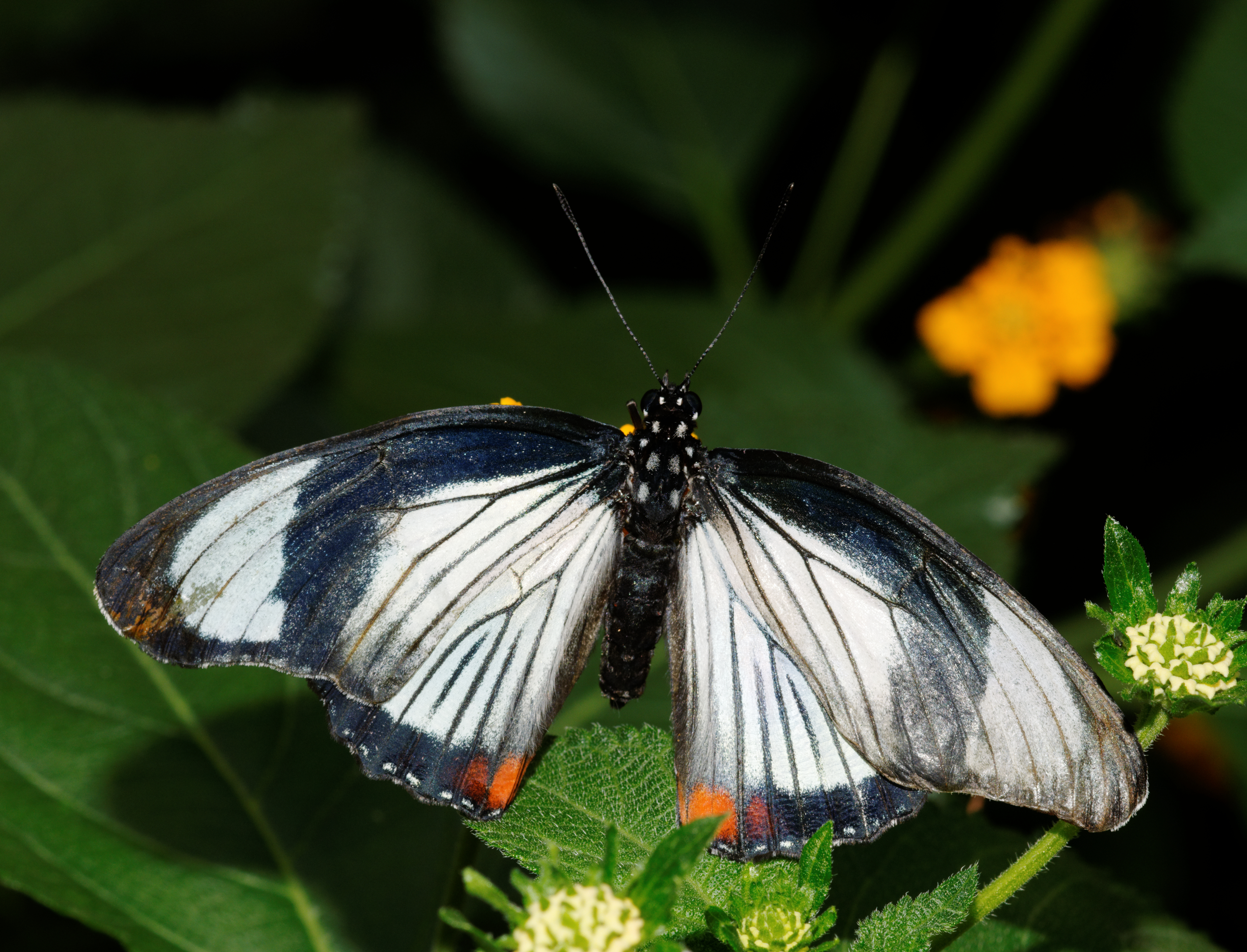

Scientific classification
- Domain: Eukaryota
- Kingdom: Animalia
- Phylum: Arthropoda
- Class: Insecta
- Order: Lepidoptera
- Family: Nymphalidae
- Genus: Hypolimnas
- Species: H. usambara

Binomial name
- Hypolimnas usambara (Ward, 1872)

Synonyms
- Diadema usambara Ward, 1872; Hypolimnas imperialis Staudinger, 1885

= Hypolimnas usambara =

Red spot diadem

Species of butterfly

Hypolimnas usambara, the red spot diadem or Usambara diadem, is a butterfly in the family Nymphalidae. It is found along the coast of Kenya and in Tanzania, from the coast inland to the Usambara Mountains of Tanga Region. The habitat consists of primary coastal forests.

The larvae feed on Urera hypselodendron.
