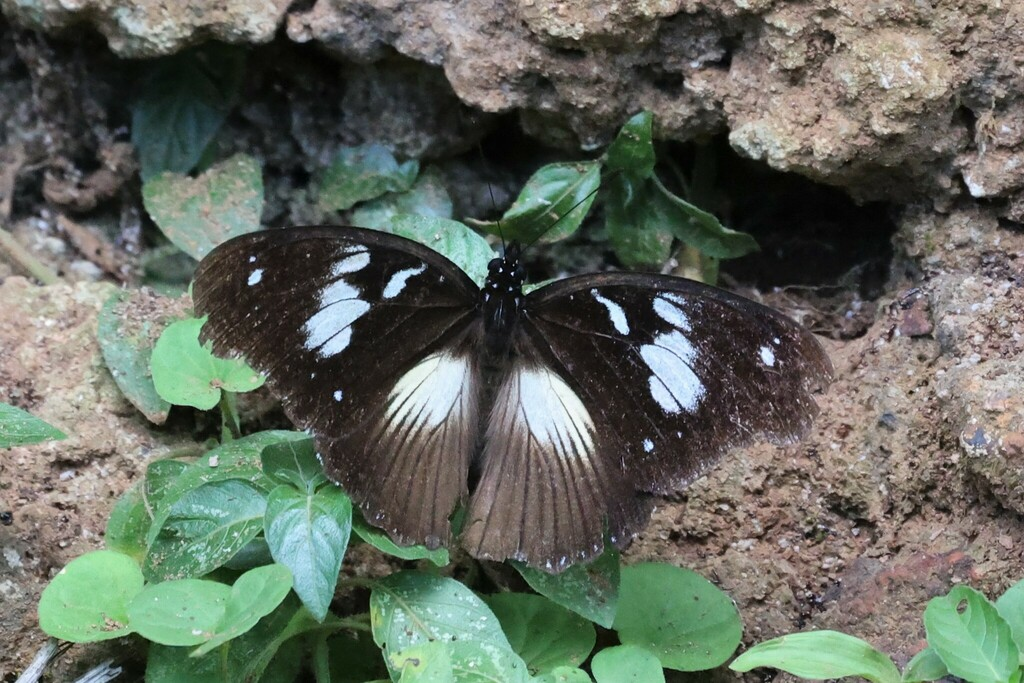

Scientific classification
- Kingdom: Animalia
- Phylum: Arthropoda
- Class: Insecta
- Order: Lepidoptera
- Family: Nymphalidae
- Genus: Hypolimnas
- Species: H. bartelotti

Binomial name
- Hypolimnas bartelotti Grose-Smith, 1890

Synonyms
- Hypolimnas bartteloti var. obliterata Holland, 1920; Hypolimnas bartteloti

= Hypolimnas bartelotti =

Species of butterfly

Hypolimnas bartelotti is a butterfly in the family Nymphalidae. It is found from Cameroon to the Democratic Republic of the Congo and in western Uganda.
