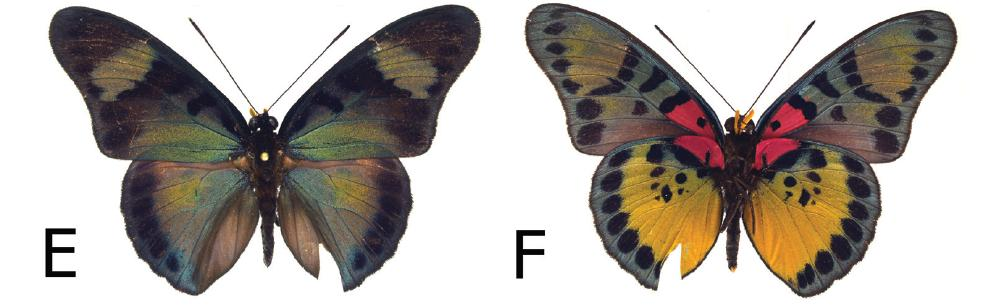
- Euphaedra sarcoptera styx male dorsal (e); ventral (f)

Scientific classification
- Kingdom: Animalia
- Phylum: Arthropoda
- Clade: Pancrustacea
- Class: Insecta
- Order: Lepidoptera
- Family: Nymphalidae
- Genus: Euphaedra
- Species: E. sarcoptera

Binomial name
- Euphaedra sarcoptera (Butler, 1871)

Synonyms
- Romaleosoma sarcoptera Butler, 1871; Euphaedra (Euphaedra) sarcoptera; Najas sarcoptera nipponicorum Carcasson, 1965

= Euphaedra sarcoptera =

Species of butterfly

Euphaedra sarcoptera, the large true forester, is a butterfly in the family Nymphalidae. It is found in Guinea, Sierra Leone, Ivory Coast, Ghana, Togo, Benin, Nigeria, Cameroon, the Central African Republic, the Democratic Republic of the Congo and Tanzania.

== Description ==
E. sarcoptera Btlr. has like aurata a broad yellow subapical band on the upperside of the forewing, but differs from both the other forms [of Euphaedra cyparissa] in the presence of a bright red spot at the base of the forewing beneath; this spot is placed in the cell and reaches about to its middle. Ashanti and Dahomey.

== Biology ==
The habitat consists of lowland forests.

It is thought to be a co-mimic of Charaxes fournierae jolybouyeri.

The larvae feed on Dennetia tripetala.

== Subspecies ==
- E. s. sarcoptera (Guinea, Sierra Leone, Ivory Coast, Ghana, Togo, Benin, Nigeria)
- E. s. cyparissoides Hecq, 1979 (Cameroon, Central African Republic, western Democratic Republic of the Congo)
- E. s. ferrea Pyrcz & Warren-Gash, 2013 (Guinea: Mount Nimba)
- E. s. nipponicorum (Carcasson, 1965) (Democratic Republic of the Congo, north-western Tanzania)
- E. s. styx Larsen & Warren-Gash, 2003 (Ivory Coast)

Torben Larsen developed a species numbering system for his 2005 publication Butterflies of West Africa. The nominate subspecies is #1065. The 'Larsen' numbers have since been used with permission in A Sharp Eye on Butterflies of Ghana.

== Gallery ==
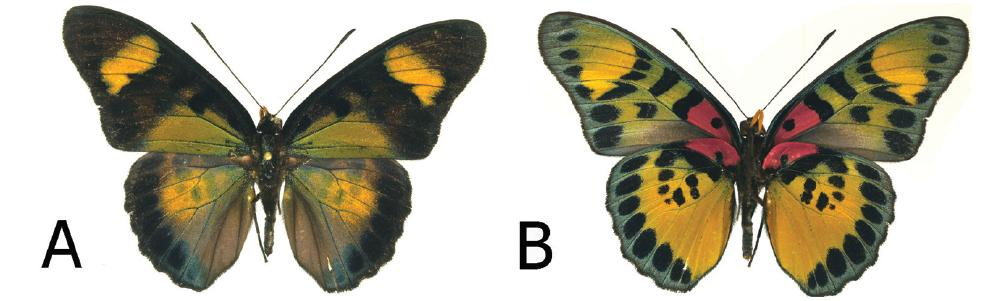
E. s. sarcoptera male dorsal (a); ventral (b)

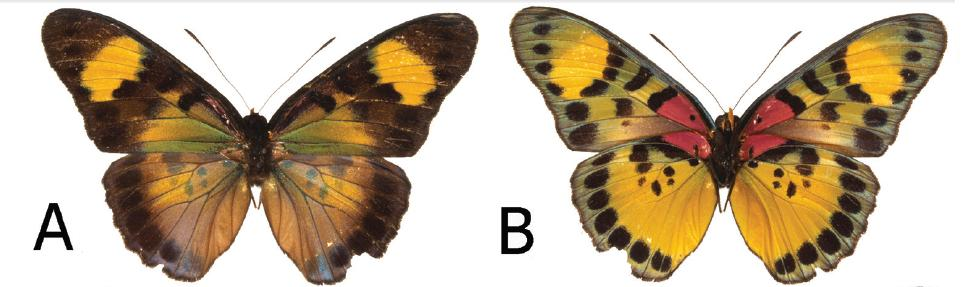
E. s. sarcoptera female dorsal (a); ventral (b)

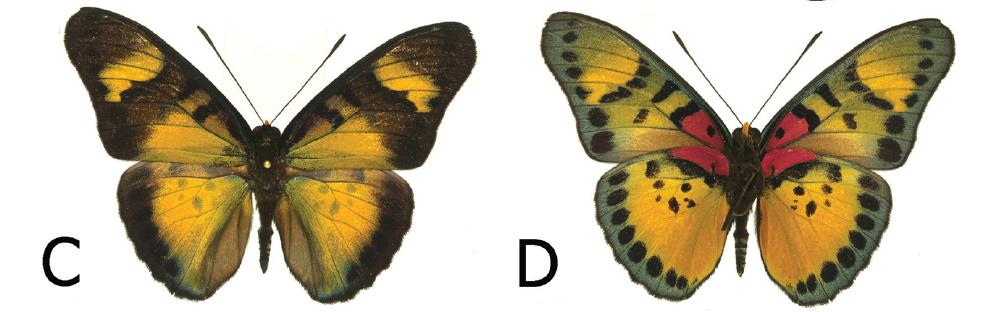
E. s. ferrea male dorsal (c); ventral (d)

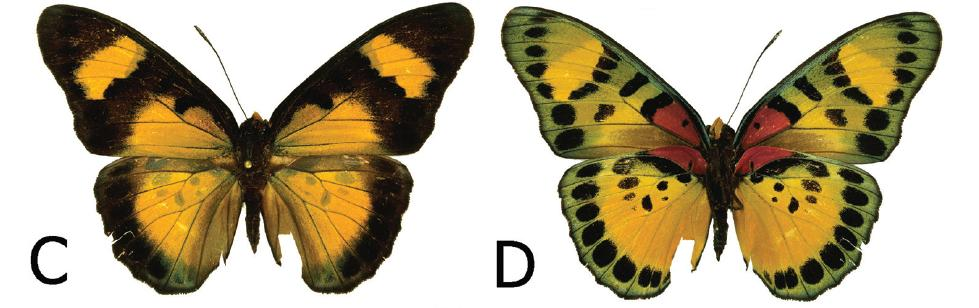
E. s. ferrea female dorsal (c); ventral (d)

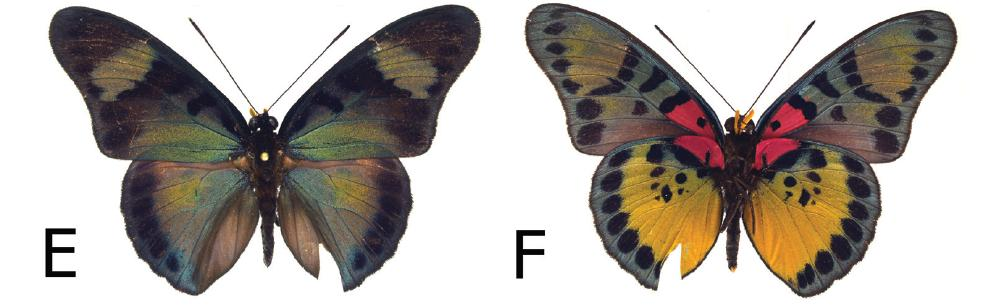
E. s. styx male dorsal (e); ventral (f)

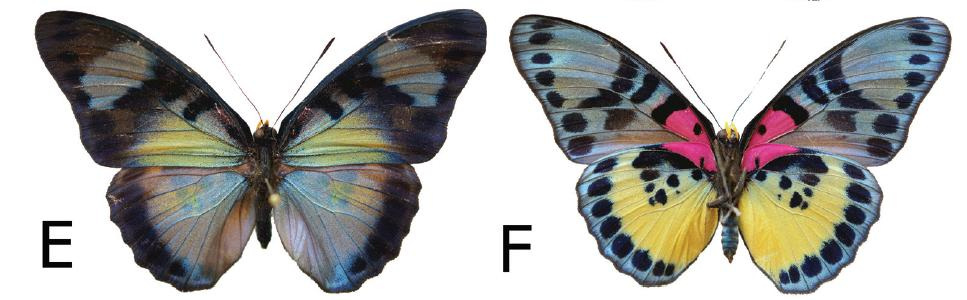
E. s. styx female dorsal (e); ventral (f)

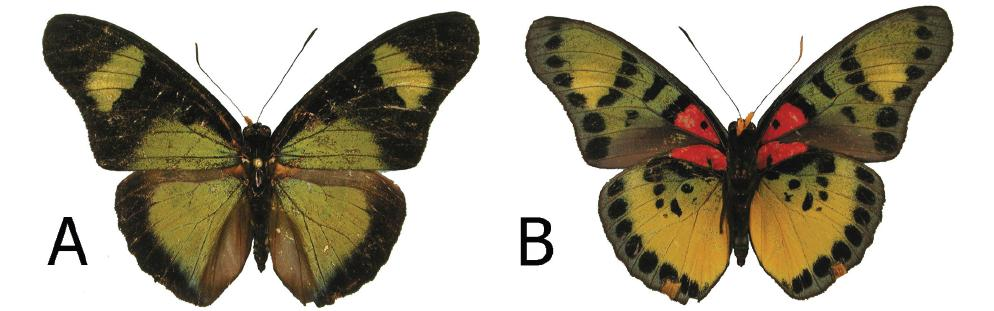
E. s. cyparissoides male dorsal (a); ventral (b)

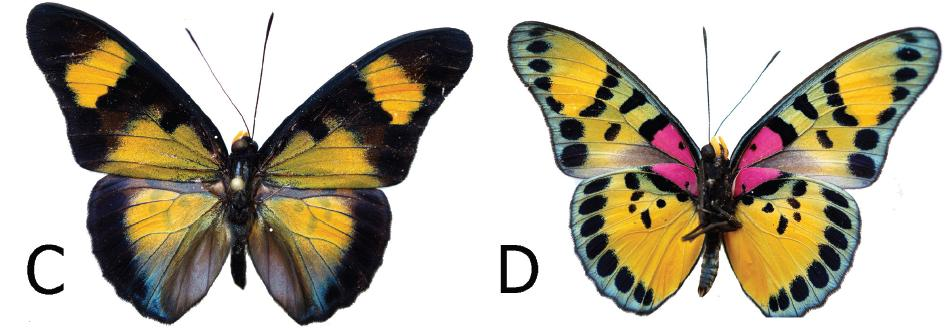
E. s. nipponicorum male dorsal (c); ventral (d)

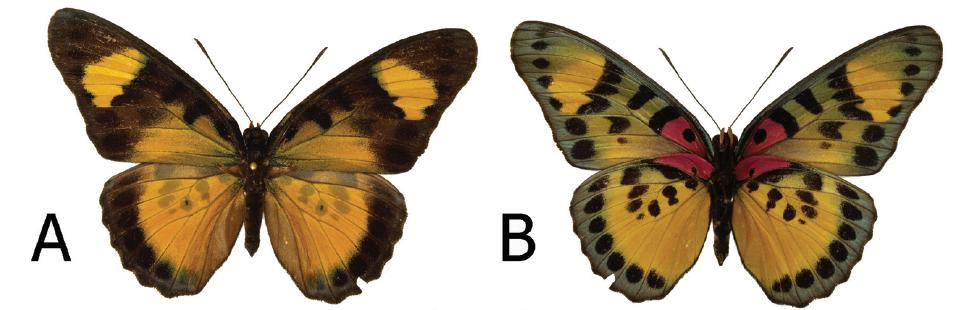
E. s. nipponicorum female dorsal (a); ventral (b)
