= Iolaus alexanderi =

Scientific classification
- Kingdom: Animalia
- Phylum: Arthropoda
- Class: Insecta
- Order: Lepidoptera
- Family: Lycaenidae
- Genus: Iolaus
- Species: I. alexanderi

Binomial name
- Iolaus alexanderi Warren-Gash, 2003

Synonyms
- Iolaus (Iolaphilus) alexanderi

Species of butterfly

Iolaus alexanderi, the Alexander's sapphire, is a butterfly in the family Lycaenidae. It is found in Ivory Coast (Taï National Park). The habitat consists of wet rainforests.

Adults are on wing in April and June.
