= Baliochila abri =

Scientific classification
- Kingdom: Animalia
- Phylum: Arthropoda
- Class: Insecta
- Order: Lepidoptera
- Family: Lycaenidae
- Genus: Baliochila
- Species: B. abri

Binomial name
- Baliochila abri Henning & Henning, 2004

Species of butterfly

Baliochila abri is a butterfly in the family Lycaenidae. It is found in central Tanzania. Its habitat consists of moist montane forests.

Adults have been recorded on wing in February and March.

== Etymology ==
The species is named for the African Butterfly Research Institute in Nairobi, Kenya.
