= Baliochila minima =

Minimal buff

Scientific classification
- Domain: Eukaryota
- Kingdom: Animalia
- Phylum: Arthropoda
- Class: Insecta
- Order: Lepidoptera
- Family: Lycaenidae
- Genus: Baliochila
- Species: B. minima

Binomial name
- Baliochila minima (Hawker-Smith, 1933)

Synonyms
- Teriomima minima Hawker-Smith, 1933

Species of butterfly

Baliochila minima, the minimal buff, is a butterfly in the family Lycaenidae. It is found along the coast of Kenya. Its habitat consists of coastal forests.
