= Haydon Warren-Gash =

British diplomat and lepidopterist

Haydon Warren-Gash (born 8 August 1949) is a retired British diplomat, and a noted lepidopterist who has described several new species.

== Diplomatic career ==
Haydon Boyd Warren-Gash was educated at Sidney Sussex College, Cambridge. He joined the Foreign and Commonwealth Office (FCO) in 1971 and after language training at SOAS served at Ankara, Madrid and Paris as well as at the FCO. He was deputy High Commissioner at Nairobi 1991–1994; head of the Southern Europe department at the FCO 1994–1997; Ambassador to Ivory Coast, Niger, Burkina Faso and Liberia 1997–2001 (during which he had to deal with a crisis when four Britons were among a group taken hostage by Liberian rebels); Ambassador to Morocco and Mauritania 2002–2005; and Ambassador to Colombia 2005–2008.

== Lepidopterology ==
Warren-Gash is a lepidopterist. While he was ambassador to Colombia he was accused of collecting rare butterflies without a licence, which he denied. He has described the following species:

- Cymothoe hartigi vanessae
- Euphaedra cyparissa nimbina
- Euphaedra sarcoptera ferrea
- Euphaedra sarcoptera styx
- Euriphene taigola
- Iolaus alexanderi
- Lepidochrysops labeensis
- Liptena bia
- Liptena seyboui

Various species are named after Warren-Gash:

- Baliochila warrengashi
- Bebearia warrengashi
- Euptera dorothea warrengashi
- Pseudaletis agrippina warrengashi

== Publications ==
- New records of Lycaenidae from Kenya: a postscript (1993), in Metamorphosis (Official Journal of the Lepidopterists' Society of Africa) Volume 4, Issue 3: 113
- The liptenids of the Banco Forest: a case study in conservation (1999), in Metamorphosis (Official Journal of the Lepidopterists' Society of Africa) Volume 10, Issue 2: 75-80
- Collecting and conserving in Côte d'Ivoire, West Africa (2002), in Metamorphosis (Official Journal of the Lepidopterists' Society of Africa) Volume 13, Issue 2: 44-50
