= Baliochila lipara =

Scientific classification
- Domain: Eukaryota
- Kingdom: Animalia
- Phylum: Arthropoda
- Class: Insecta
- Order: Lepidoptera
- Family: Lycaenidae
- Genus: Baliochila
- Species: B. lipara

Binomial name
- Baliochila lipara Stempffer & Bennett, 1953

Species of butterfly

Baliochila lipara, the Lipara buff, is a butterfly of the family Lycaenidae. It is found in Malawi and from Zimbabwe to the coast of eastern Kenya. It has recently been discovered in the Manguzi and Temble areas of KwaZulu-Natal, South Africa. The habitat consists of deciduous woodland and savanna at altitudes ranging from 500 to 1,000 metres.

The larvae feed on algae (cyanobacteria) growing on trees.
