= Baliochila neavei =

Scientific classification
- Domain: Eukaryota
- Kingdom: Animalia
- Phylum: Arthropoda
- Class: Insecta
- Order: Lepidoptera
- Family: Lycaenidae
- Genus: Baliochila
- Species: B. neavei

Binomial name
- Baliochila neavei Stempffer & Bennett, 1953

Species of butterfly

Baliochila neavei, the Neave's buff, is a butterfly in the family Lycaenidae which is found in Burundi, eastern Tanzania, the Democratic Republic of the Congo (Haut-Shaba), Malawi and Mozambique. Its habitat consists of forests.

Adults are on wing from August to April. The larvae feed on algae (cyanobacteria) which grows on trees.
