= Baliochila collinsi =

Scientific classification
- Kingdom: Animalia
- Phylum: Arthropoda
- Class: Insecta
- Order: Lepidoptera
- Family: Lycaenidae
- Genus: Baliochila
- Species: B. collinsi

Binomial name
- Baliochila collinsi Henning & Henning, 2004

Species of butterfly

Baliochila collinsi is a butterfly in the family Lycaenidae. It is found in south-eastern Tanzania. Its habitat consists of montane forests.

Adults have been recorded on wing in February and March.
