= Baliochila amanica =

Scientific classification
- Domain: Eukaryota
- Kingdom: Animalia
- Phylum: Arthropoda
- Class: Insecta
- Order: Lepidoptera
- Family: Lycaenidae
- Genus: Baliochila
- Species: B. amanica

Binomial name
- Baliochila amanica Stempffer & Bennett, 1953

Species of butterfly

Baliochila amanica, the amani buff, is a butterfly in the family Lycaenidae. It is found in south-eastern Kenya and north-eastern Tanzania. Its habitat consists of lowland forests at altitudes ranging from sea level to 1,100 metres.
