= Baliochila mwanihanae =

Scientific classification
- Kingdom: Animalia
- Phylum: Arthropoda
- Class: Insecta
- Order: Lepidoptera
- Family: Lycaenidae
- Genus: Baliochila
- Species: B. mwanihanae

Binomial name
- Baliochila mwanihanae Congdon, Kielland & Collins, 1998

Species of butterfly

Baliochila mwanihanae is a butterfly in the family Lycaenidae. It is found in Tanzania (on the slopes of Mwanihana Mountain).
