= Baliochila congdoni =

Scientific classification
- Kingdom: Animalia
- Phylum: Arthropoda
- Class: Insecta
- Order: Lepidoptera
- Family: Lycaenidae
- Genus: Baliochila
- Species: B. congdoni

Binomial name
- Baliochila congdoni Kielland, 1990

Species of butterfly

Baliochila congdoni is a butterfly in the family Lycaenidae. It is found in north-eastern Tanzania. Its habitat consists of submontane forests.

The length of the forewings is about 13.1 mm.
