= Baliochila nguru =

Scientific classification
- Kingdom: Animalia
- Phylum: Arthropoda
- Clade: Pancrustacea
- Class: Insecta
- Order: Lepidoptera
- Family: Lycaenidae
- Genus: Baliochila
- Species: B. nguru

Binomial name
- Baliochila nguru Kielland, 1986

Species of butterfly

Baliochila nguru is a butterfly in the family Lycaenidae. It is found in Tanzania (in the Nguru Mountains). Its habitat consists of primary forests at altitudes between 1,200 and 1,400 metres.
