= Baliochila confusa =

Scientific classification
- Domain: Eukaryota
- Kingdom: Animalia
- Phylum: Arthropoda
- Class: Insecta
- Order: Lepidoptera
- Family: Lycaenidae
- Genus: Baliochila
- Species: B. confusa

Binomial name
- Baliochila confusa Henning & Henning, 2004

Species of butterfly

Baliochila confusa is a butterfly in the family Lycaenidae. It is found in Kenya. Its habitat consists of forests and woodland.

Adults are on wing in October.
