= Baliochila megadentata =

Scientific classification
- Kingdom: Animalia
- Phylum: Arthropoda
- Clade: Pancrustacea
- Class: Insecta
- Order: Lepidoptera
- Family: Lycaenidae
- Genus: Baliochila
- Species: B. megadentata

Binomial name
- Baliochila megadentata Henning & Henning, 2004

Species of butterfly

Baliochila megadentata is a butterfly in the family Lycaenidae. It is found in central Tanzania. Its habitat consists of moist montane forests.

Adults have been recorded on wing in February.
