= Baliochila warrengashi =

Scientific classification
- Kingdom: Animalia
- Phylum: Arthropoda
- Class: Insecta
- Order: Lepidoptera
- Family: Lycaenidae
- Genus: Baliochila
- Species: B. warrengashi

Binomial name
- Baliochila warrengashi Collins & Larsen, 1996

Species of butterfly

Baliochila warrengashi is a butterfly in the family Lycaenidae. It is found in the Usambara Mountains of Tanzania.

Adults are on wing in February and March.

== Eponym ==
Baliochila warrengashi is named in honour of Haydon Warren-Gash.
