= Baliochila lequeuxi =

Lequeux's buff

Conservation status
- Near Threatened (IUCN 3.1)

Scientific classification
- Kingdom: Animalia
- Phylum: Arthropoda
- Class: Insecta
- Order: Lepidoptera
- Family: Lycaenidae
- Genus: Baliochila
- Species: B. lequeuxi

Binomial name
- Baliochila lequeuxi Kielland, 1994

Species of butterfly

Baliochila lequeuxi, the Lequeux's buff, is a butterfly in the family Lycaenidae. It is found on Mafia Island off of Tanzania.

Adults are on the wing in June, November and January.
