= Baliochila dubiosa =

Scientific classification
- Kingdom: Animalia
- Phylum: Arthropoda
- Class: Insecta
- Order: Lepidoptera
- Family: Lycaenidae
- Genus: Baliochila
- Species: B. dubiosa

Binomial name
- Baliochila dubiosa Stempffer & Bennett, 1953

Species of butterfly

Baliochila dubiosa, the dubious buff, is a butterfly in the family Lycaenidae. It is found in eastern Kenya and north-eastern Tanzania. Its habitat consists of lowland forests.
