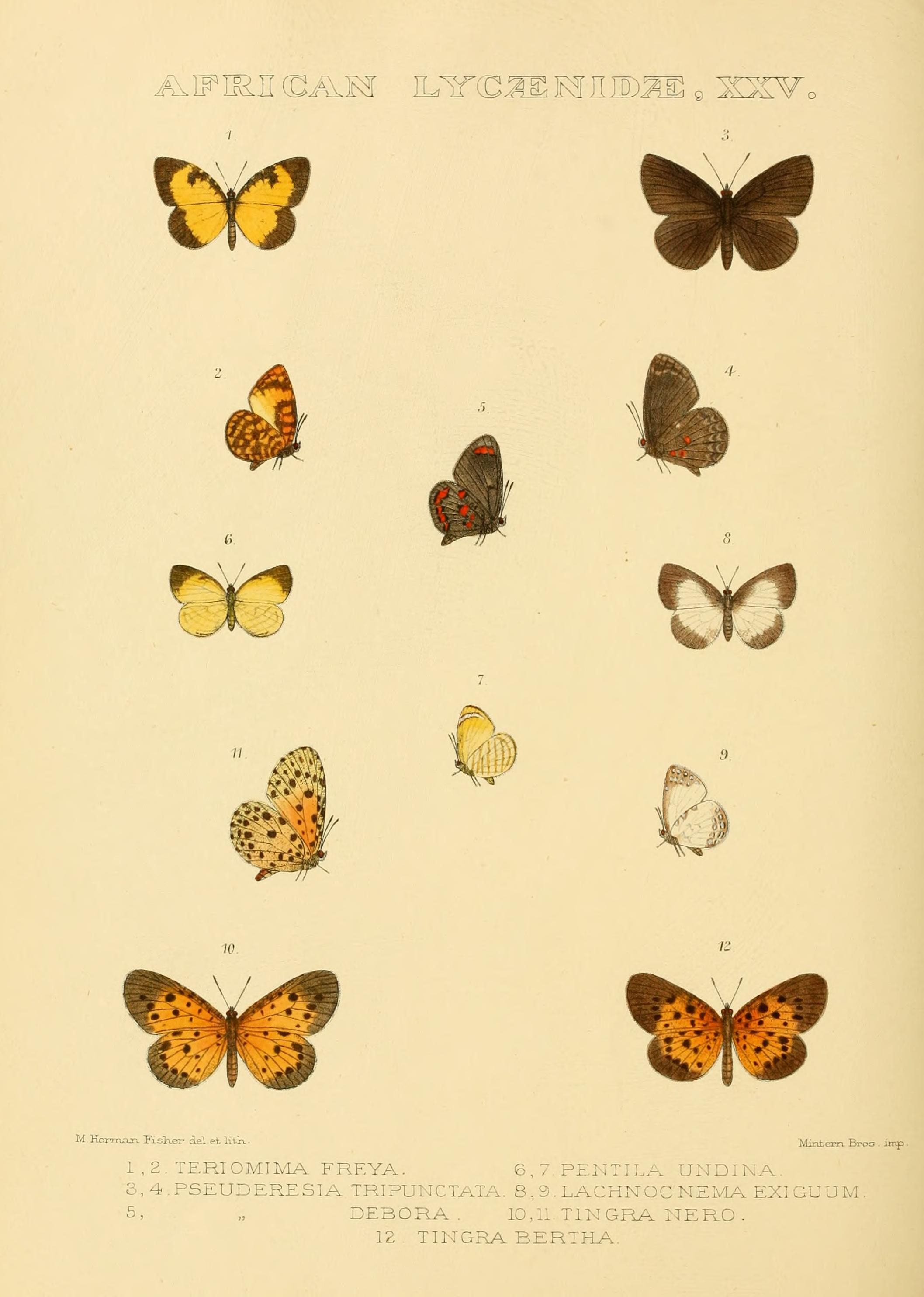
- Figures 1 and 2

Scientific classification
- Domain: Eukaryota
- Kingdom: Animalia
- Phylum: Arthropoda
- Class: Insecta
- Order: Lepidoptera
- Family: Lycaenidae
- Genus: Baliochila
- Species: B. hildegarda

Binomial name
- Baliochila hildegarda (Kirby, 1887)

Synonyms
- Teriomima hildegarda Kirby, 1887; Teriomima freya Grose-Smith and Kirby, 1894

= Baliochila hildegarda =

Species of butterfly

Baliochila hildegarda, the Hildegard's buff, is a butterfly in the family Lycaenidae. It is found in eastern Kenya, Tanzania, Malawi, Zambia and the Democratic Republic of the Congo (Shaba). Its habitat consists of woodland and forest margins at attitudes ranging from sea level to 1,600 metres.
