= Baliochila citrina =

Scientific classification
- Kingdom: Animalia
- Phylum: Arthropoda
- Class: Insecta
- Order: Lepidoptera
- Family: Lycaenidae
- Genus: Baliochila
- Species: B. citrina

Binomial name
- Baliochila citrina Henning & Henning, 2004

Species of butterfly

Baliochila citrina is a butterfly in the family Lycaenidae. It is found in north-eastern Tanzania. Its habitat consists of montane and riverine forests.

Adults have been recorded on wing in February and March.
