= Bebearia warrengashi =

Warren-Gash's forester

Scientific classification
- Kingdom: Animalia
- Phylum: Arthropoda
- Class: Insecta
- Order: Lepidoptera
- Family: Nymphalidae
- Genus: Bebearia
- Species: B. warrengashi

Binomial name
- Bebearia warrengashi Hecq, 2000

Synonyms
- Bebearia warren-gashi Hecq, 2000; Bebearia (Bebearia) warrengashi

Species of butterfly

Bebearia warrengashi, or Warren-Gash's forester, is a butterfly in the family Nymphalidae. It is found in Ivory Coast. The habitat consists of forests.

== Eponym ==
Bebearia warrengashi is named in honour of Haydon Warren-Gash.
