= Baliochila fusca =

Scientific classification
- Kingdom: Animalia
- Phylum: Arthropoda
- Class: Insecta
- Order: Lepidoptera
- Family: Lycaenidae
- Genus: Baliochila
- Species: B. fusca

Binomial name
- Baliochila fusca Henning & Henning, 2004

Species of butterfly

Baliochila fusca is a butterfly in the family Lycaenidae. It is found in south-eastern Tanzania. Its habitat consists of montane forests.
