= Baliochila pringlei =

Scientific classification
- Kingdom: Animalia
- Phylum: Arthropoda
- Class: Insecta
- Order: Lepidoptera
- Family: Lycaenidae
- Genus: Baliochila
- Species: B. pringlei

Binomial name
- Baliochila pringlei Stempffer, 1967

Species of butterfly

Baliochila pringlei is a butterfly in the family Lycaenidae. It is found in Tanzania (Usambara). Its habitat consists of montane forests.
