= Baliochila barnesi =

Scientific classification
- Domain: Eukaryota
- Kingdom: Animalia
- Phylum: Arthropoda
- Class: Insecta
- Order: Lepidoptera
- Family: Lycaenidae
- Genus: Baliochila
- Species: B. barnesi

Binomial name
- Baliochila barnesi Stempffer & Bennett, 1953

Species of butterfly

Baliochila barnesi, the Barnes's buff, is a butterfly in the family Lycaenidae. It is found in eastern Zimbabwe, western Mozambique and the Democratic Republic of the Congo. The species was formally described as new to science in 1953 by Henri Stempffer and Neville Henry Bennett.

Adults have been recorded on wing in November, December, March and April.

The larvae feed on algae (cyanobacteria) growing on trees.
