= Lepidochrysops labeensis =

Scientific classification
- Kingdom: Animalia
- Phylum: Arthropoda
- Class: Insecta
- Order: Lepidoptera
- Family: Lycaenidae
- Genus: Lepidochrysops
- Species: L. labeensis

Binomial name
- Lepidochrysops labeensis Larsen & Warren-Gash, 2000

Species of butterfly

Lepidochrysops labeensis, the Labe giant Cupid, is a butterfly in the family Lycaenidae. It is found in Guinea.

Adults have been recorded in June.
