= Baliochila nyasae =

Scientific classification
- Domain: Eukaryota
- Kingdom: Animalia
- Phylum: Arthropoda
- Class: Insecta
- Order: Lepidoptera
- Family: Lycaenidae
- Genus: Baliochila
- Species: B. nyasae

Binomial name
- Baliochila nyasae Stempffer & Bennett, 1953

Species of butterfly

Baliochila nyasae is a butterfly in the family Lycaenidae. It is found in Malawi (from the southern part of the country to the Mlanje district).
