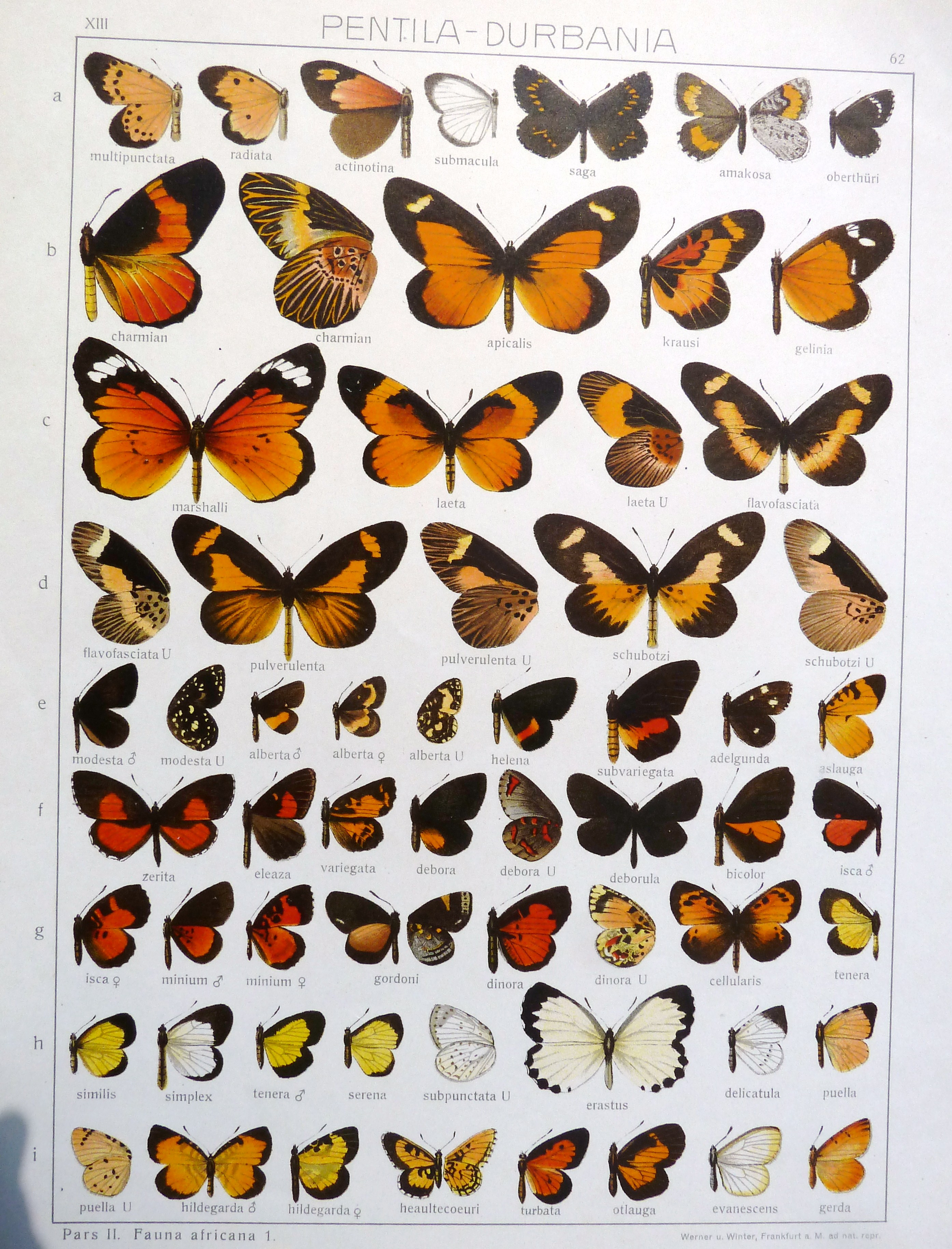
- In Adalbert Seitz's Fauna Africana

Scientific classification
- Domain: Eukaryota
- Kingdom: Animalia
- Phylum: Arthropoda
- Class: Insecta
- Order: Lepidoptera
- Family: Lycaenidae
- Genus: Baliochila
- Species: B. aslauga

Binomial name
- Baliochila aslauga (Trimen, 1873)

Synonyms
- Liptena aslauga Trimen, 1873; Baliochila aslanga

= Baliochila aslauga =

Species of butterfly

Baliochila aslauga, the common buff, is a butterfly of the family Lycaenidae. It is found in South Africa, in the coastal and riverine forests of KwaZulu-Natal, inland along the Lebombo Mountains into Eswatini, Mpumalanga and north to Mozambique, Zimbabwe and the Victoria Falls.

The wingspan is 23.5–29 mm for males and 25–31 mm for females. Adults are on wing from October to March. There is one generation per year.

The larvae feed on species of cyanobacteria.
