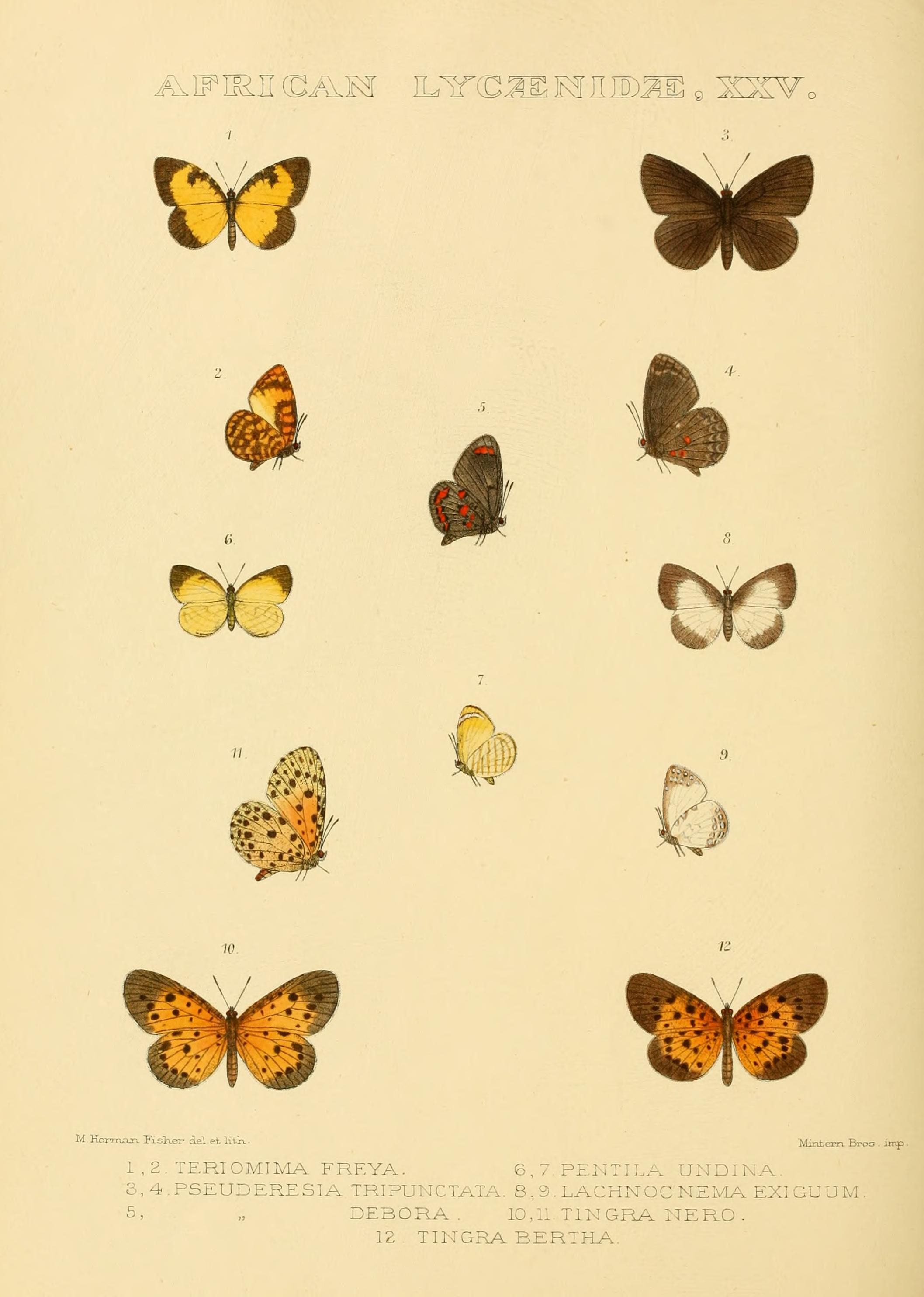
- Baliochila hildegarda figures 1 and 2

Scientific classification
- Domain: Eukaryota
- Kingdom: Animalia
- Phylum: Arthropoda
- Class: Insecta
- Order: Lepidoptera
- Family: Lycaenidae
- Subfamily: Poritiinae
- Genus: Baliochila; Stempffer & Bennett, 1953

= Baliochila =

Butterfly genus in family Lycaenidae

Baliochila is a genus of butterflies, commonly called buffs, in the family Lycaenidae. They are found only in the Afrotropical realm.

== Species ==
- Baliochila abri Henning & Henning, 2004
- Baliochila amanica Stempffer & Bennet, 1953
- Baliochila aslauga (Trimen, 1873)
- Baliochila barnesi Stempffer & Bennett, 1953
- Baliochila citrina Henning & Henning, 2004
- Baliochila collinsi Henning & Henning, 2004
- Baliochila confusa Henning & Henning, 2004
- Baliochila congdoni Kielland, 1990
- Baliochila dubiosa Stempffer & Bennett, 1953
- Baliochila fragilis Stempffer & Bennett, 1953
- Baliochila fusca Henning & Henning, 2004
- Baliochila hildegarda (Kirby, 1887)
- Baliochila latimarginata (Hawker-Smith, 1933)
- Baliochila lequeuxi Kielland, 1994
- Baliochila megadentata Henning & Henning, 2004
- Baliochila minima (Hawker-Smith, 1933)
- Baliochila mwanihanae Congdon, Kielland & Collins, 1998
- Baliochila neavei Stempffer & Bennett, 1953
- Baliochila nguru Kielland, 1986
- Baliochila nyasae Stempffer & Bennett, 1953
- Baliochila lipara Stempffer & Bennett, 1953
- Baliochila pringlei Stempffer, 1967
- Baliochila pseudofragilis Kielland, 1976
- Baliochila singularis Stempffer & Bennett, 1953
- Baliochila stygia Stempffer & Bennett, 1953
- Baliochila warrengashi Collins & Larsen, 1996
- Baliochila woodi (Riley, 1943)
