= Baliochila woodi =

Scientific classification
- Domain: Eukaryota
- Kingdom: Animalia
- Phylum: Arthropoda
- Class: Insecta
- Order: Lepidoptera
- Family: Lycaenidae
- Genus: Baliochila
- Species: B. woodi

Binomial name
- Baliochila woodi (Riley, 1943)

Synonyms
- Teriomima woodi Riley, 1943

Species of butterfly

Baliochila woodi is a butterfly in the family Lycaenidae. It is found in southern Malawi. Its habitat consists of the deeply shaded shrub layer of Newtonia gallery forests and riverine forests.
