= Baliochila pseudofragilis =

Scientific classification
- Kingdom: Animalia
- Phylum: Arthropoda
- Class: Insecta
- Order: Lepidoptera
- Family: Lycaenidae
- Genus: Baliochila
- Species: B. pseudofragilis

Binomial name
- Baliochila pseudofragilis Kielland, 1976

Species of butterfly

Baliochila pseudofragilis is a butterfly in the family Lycaenidae. It is found in northern Tanzania. Its habitat consists of forest margins and open patches in forests at altitudes between 1,400 and 1,800 metres.
