= Baliochila stygia =

Scientific classification
- Domain: Eukaryota
- Kingdom: Animalia
- Phylum: Arthropoda
- Class: Insecta
- Order: Lepidoptera
- Family: Lycaenidae
- Genus: Baliochila
- Species: B. stygia

Binomial name
- Baliochila stygia Stempffer & Bennett, 1953

Synonyms
- Teriomima minima f. stygia Talbot, 1937

Species of butterfly

Baliochila stygia is a butterfly in the family Lycaenidae. It is found along the coast of Kenya and in Tanzania (on the north coast, including Pemba Island). Its habitat consists of coastal forests.
