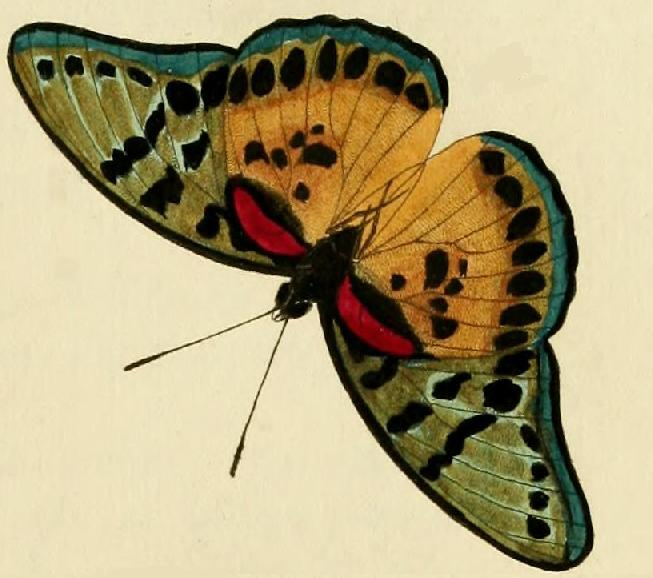

Scientific classification
- Kingdom: Animalia
- Phylum: Arthropoda
- Clade: Pancrustacea
- Class: Insecta
- Order: Lepidoptera
- Family: Nymphalidae
- Genus: Euphaedra
- Species: E. cyparissa

Binomial name
- Euphaedra cyparissa (Cramer, 1775)

Synonyms
- Papilio cyparissa Cramer, 1775; Euphaedra (Euphaedra) cyparissa; Papilio cato Fabricius, 1787; Euphaedra cyparissa var. aurata Carpenter, 1895; Euphaedra cyparissa aureola Rothschild, 1918

= Euphaedra cyparissa =

Species of butterfly

Euphaedra cyparissa, the true forester, is a butterfly in the family Nymphalidae. It is found in Guinea, Sierra Leone, Liberia, Ivory Coast, Ghana, Nigeria, Cameroon, the Central African Republic and the Democratic Republic of the Congo. The habitat consists of drier forests and open wet forests or the edges of wet forests.

The length of the forewings is 31–33 mm for males and about 40 mm for females. The upperside colour is black and apple green with a delicate yellow sheen, somewhat more prominent on the hindwing median area.

== Description in Seitz ==
E. cyparissa is distinguished by the black discal spots and the large black submarginal spots on both wings beneath and by having the submarginal spots on the underside of the forewing placed in an irregularly curved line, the spots in cellules 3 and 4 being much nearer to the distal margin; the discal spot in cellule 2 on the forewing beneath is transversely placed and stands before the middle of the cellule. As in the other species the hindwing is green above with broad black marginal band and the forewing at the hindmargin also green at least as far as the cell; the underside of the hindwing is more or less extended gold-yellow or orange-yellow in the middle. - cyparissa Cr. The forewing above with green subapical band, beneath not red at the base. Sierra Leone and Congo. ab.aurata Carpent.- The forewing above with yellow subapical band, beneath not red at the base. Niger and Cameroons.

Adults are attracted to fallen fruit.

== Subspecies ==
- E. c. cyparissa (Guinea, Sierra Leone, Liberia, Ivory Coast)
- E. c. aurantina Pyrcz & Oremans, 2013 (Ivory Coast, Ghana)
- E. c. aurata Carpenter, 1895 (Ivory Coast, Ghana, Nigeria, Cameroon, Central African Republic, Democratic Republic of the Congo)
- E. c. nimbina Pyrcz & Warren-Gash, 2013 (Guinea: Mont Nimba, Fouta Djalon range)
- E. c. nominalina Pyrcz & Knoop, 2013 (eastern Cameroon, Central African Republic)
- E. c. tai Hecq, 1986 (Ivory Coast: Tai National Park)

Torben Larsen developed a species numbering system for his 2005 publication Butterflies of West Africa. The subspecies aurantina is #1064. The 'Larsen' numbers have since been used with permission in A Sharp Eye on Butterflies of Ghana.

== Gallery ==
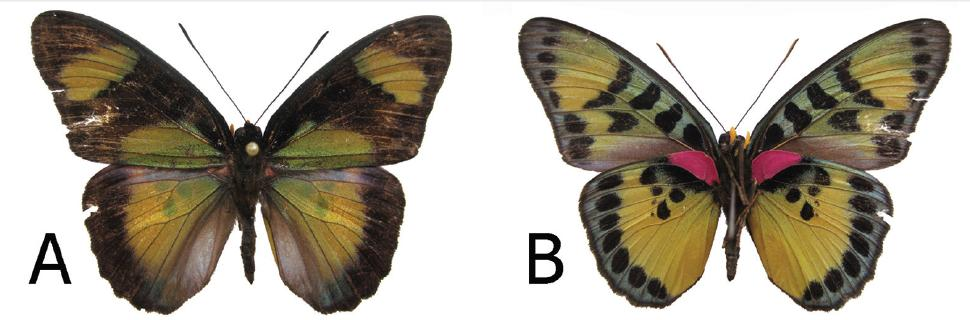
E. c. cyparissa male dorsal (a); ventral (b)

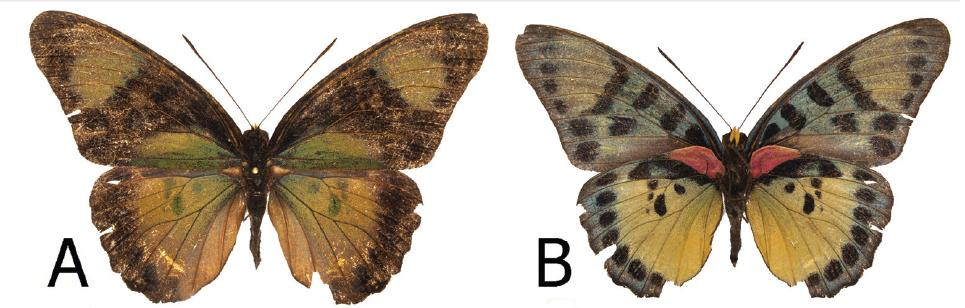
E. c. cyparissa female dorsal (a); ventral (b)

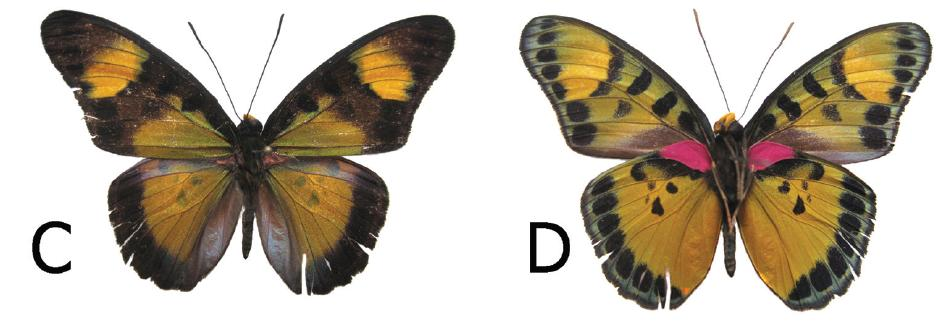
E. c. nimbina male dorsal (c); ventral (d)

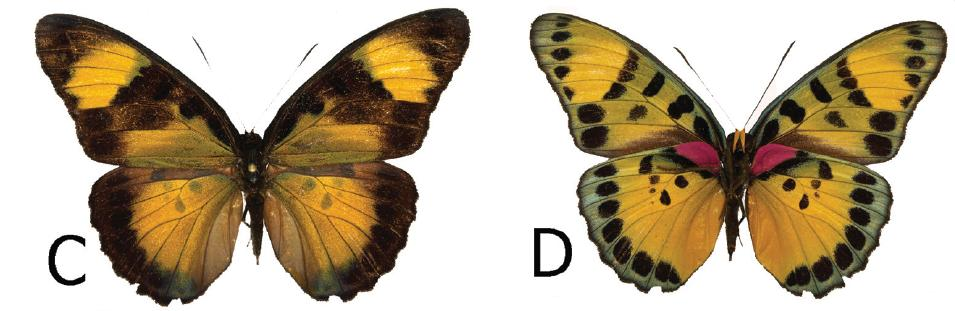
E. c. nimbina female dorsal (c); ventral (d)

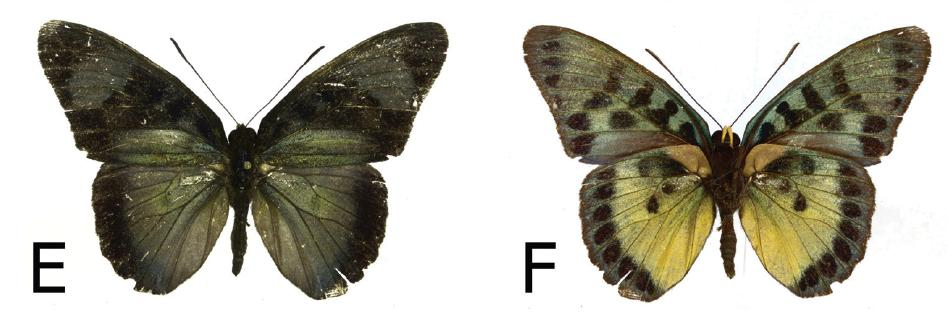
E. c. tai male dorsal (e); ventral (f)

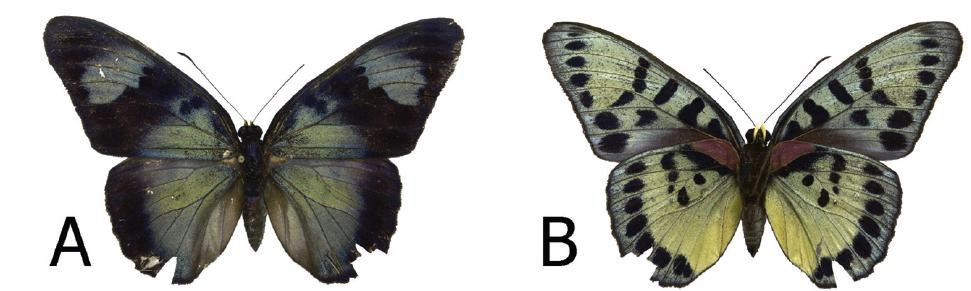
E. c. tai female dorsal (a); ventral (b)

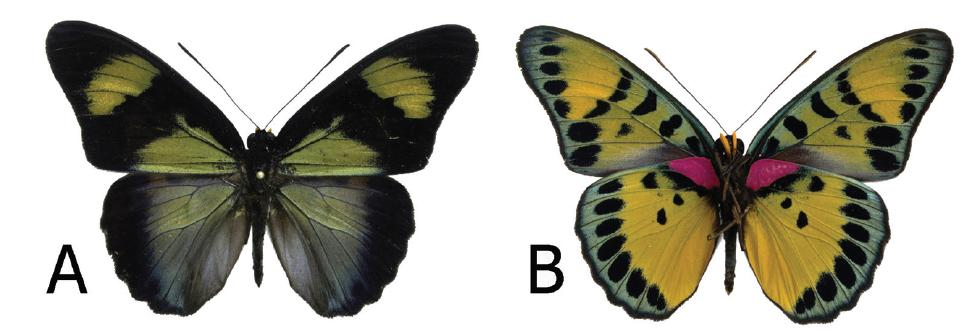
E. c. aurantina male dorsal (a); ventral (b)

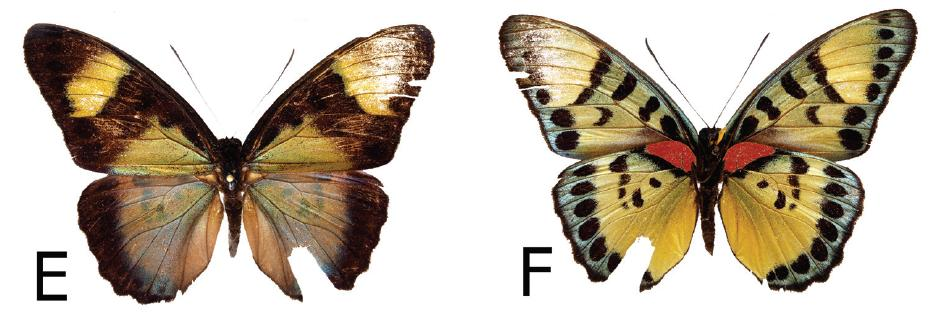
E. c. aurantina female dorsal (e); ventral (f)

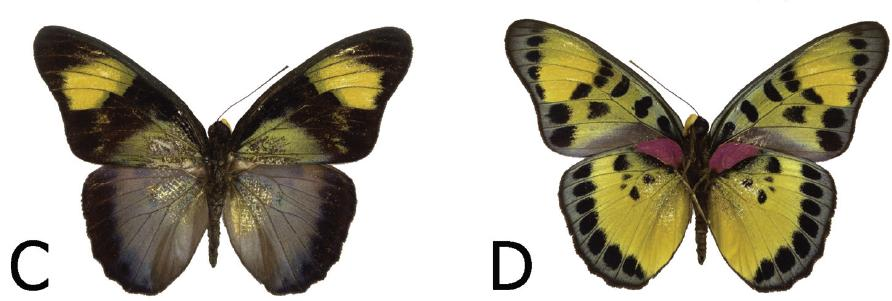
E. c. aurata male dorsal (c); ventral (d)

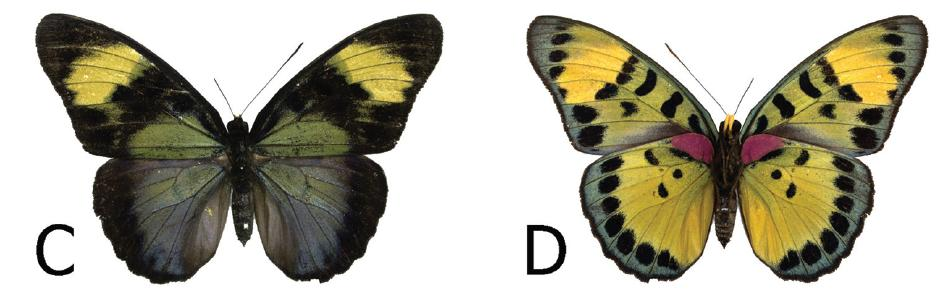
E. c. aurata female dorsal (c); ventral (d)

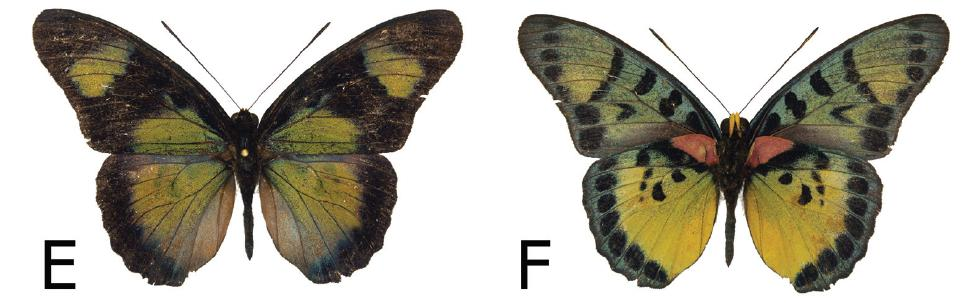
E. c. nominalina male dorsal (e); ventral (f)

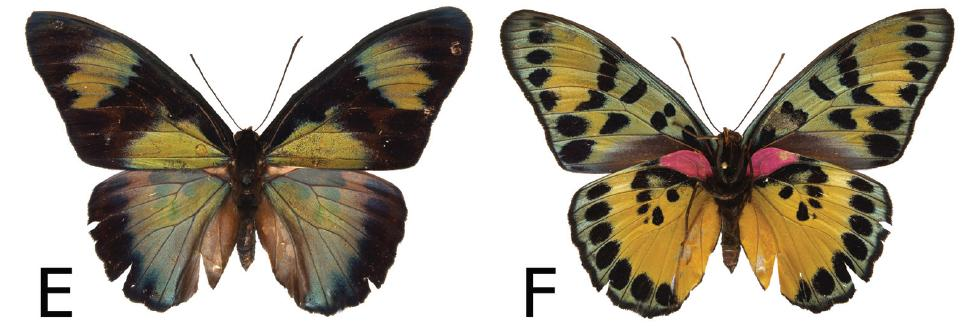
E. c. nominalina female dorsal (e); ventral (f)
