= List of butterflies of the Democratic Republic of the Congo =

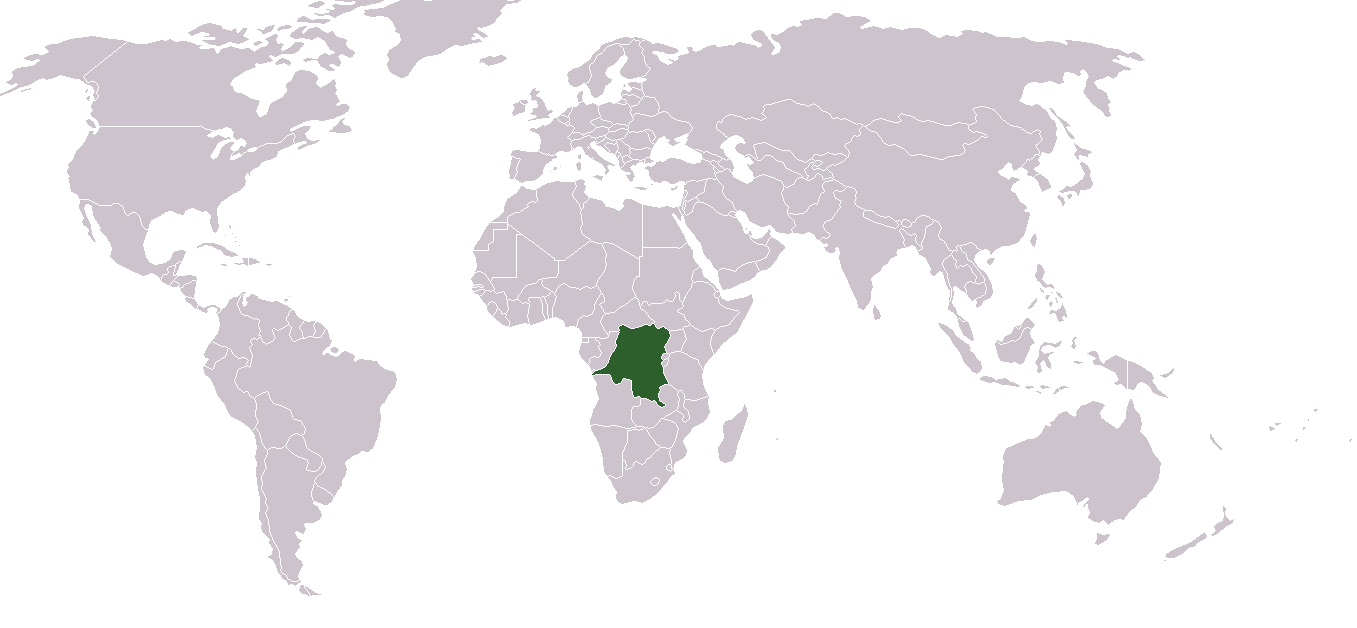
Location of the Democratic Republic of the Congo

This is a list of butterflies of the Democratic Republic of the Congo. About 2,040 species are known from the Democratic Republic of the Congo, 181 of which are endemic. The majority of species occur in the Congolese rainforest - Western Congolian swamp forests, Eastern Congolian swamp forests, Central Congolian lowland forests, Northeastern Congolian lowland forests and it's transitions to forest-savanna mosaic, savannas, and grasslands. Others, many rare, are found in the Albertine Rift montane forests. The miombo woodlands in the southern portion of the country are home for many species.

== Papilionidae ==
=== Papilioninae ===
==== Papilionini ====
- Papilio antimachus antimachus Drury, 1782
- Papilio antimachus parva Jackson, 1956
- Papilio zalmoxis Hewitson, 1864
- Papilio nireus Linnaeus, 1758
- Papilio charopus montuosus Joicey & Talbot, 1927
- Papilio chrapkowskoides chrapkowskoides Storace, 1952
- Papilio chrapkowskoides nurettini Koçak, 1983
- Papilio sosia pulchra Berger, 1950
- Papilio thuraui occidua Storace, 1951
- Papilio cynorta Fabricius, 1793
- Papilio plagiatus Aurivillius, 1898
- Papilio dardanus Brown, 1776
- Papilio constantinus mweruanus Joicey & Talbot, 1927
- Papilio phorcas congoanus Rothschild, 1896
- Papilio rex mimeticus Rothschild, 1897
- Papilio zenobia Fabricius, 1775
- Papilio filaprae Suffert, 1904
- Papilio gallienus Distant, 1879
- Papilio mechowi Dewitz, 1881
- Papilio mechowianus Dewitz, 1885
- Papilio echerioides homeyeri Plötz, 1880
- Papilio echerioides joiceyi Gabriel, 1945
- Papilio echerioides nioka (Hancock, 1989)
- Papilio jacksoni hecqui Berger, 1954
- Papilio jacksoni ruandana Le Cerf, 1924
- Papilio nobilis crippsianus Stoneham, 1936
- Papilio hesperus Westwood, 1843
- Papilio lormieri lormieri Distant, 1874
- Papilio lormieri semlikana Le Cerf, 1924
- Papilio ophidicephalus Oberthür, 1878
- Papilio leucotaenia Rothschild, 1908
- Papilio mackinnoni mackinnoni Sharpe, 1891
- Papilio mackinnoni theodori Riley, 1921

==== Leptocercini ====
- Graphium antheus (Cramer, 1779)
- Graphium policenes (Cramer, 1775)
- Graphium biokoensis (Gauthier, 1984)
- Graphium policenoides (Holland, 1892)
- Graphium junodi (Trimen, 1893)
- Graphium polistratus (Grose-Smith, 1889)
- Graphium colonna (Ward, 1873)
- Graphium illyris hamatus (Joicey & Talbot, 1918)
- Graphium gudenusi (Rebel, 1911)
- Graphium porthaon (Hewitson, 1865)
- Graphium angolanus angolanus (Goeze, 1779)
- Graphium angolanus baronis (Ungemach, 1932)
- Graphium taboranus (Oberthür, 1886)
- Graphium schaffgotschi (Niepelt, 1927)
- Graphium ridleyanus (White, 1843)
- Graphium leonidas (Fabricius, 1793)
- Graphium tynderaeus (Fabricius, 1793)
- Graphium latreillianus theorini (Aurivillius, 1881)
- Graphium philonoe (Ward, 1873)
- Graphium adamastor (Boisduval, 1836)
- Graphium agamedes (Westwood, 1842)
- Graphium schubotzi (Schultze, 1913)
- Graphium olbrechtsi olbrechtsi Berger, 1950 (endemic)
- Graphium olbrechtsi tongoni Berger, 1969 (endemic)
- Graphium almansor almansor (Honrath, 1884)
- Graphium almansor escherichi (Gaede, 1915)
- Graphium almansor uganda (Lathy, 1906)
- Graphium auriger (Butler, 1876)
- Graphium fulleri boulleti (Le Cerf, 1912)
- Graphium ucalegonides (Staudinger, 1884)
- Graphium poggianus (Honrath, 1884)
- Graphium hachei hachei (Dewitz, 1881)
- Graphium hachei moebii (Suffert, 1904)
- Graphium aurivilliusi (Seeldrayers, 1896) (endemic)
- Graphium ucalegon ucalegon (Hewitson, 1865)
- Graphium ucalegon fonteinei Berger, 1981
- Graphium ucalegon schoutedeni Berger, 1950
- Graphium simoni (Aurivillius, 1899)

== Pieridae ==
=== Pseudopontiinae ===
- Pseudopontia paradoxa (Felder & Felder, 1869)

=== Coliadinae ===
- Eurema brigitta (Stoll, [1780])
- Eurema mandarinula (Holland, 1892)
- Eurema regularis (Butler, 1876)
- Eurema floricola leonis (Butler, 1886)
- Eurema hecabe solifera (Butler, 1875)
- Eurema senegalensis (Boisduval, 1836)
- Eurema upembana (Berger, 1981)
- Catopsilia florella (Fabricius, 1775)
- Colias electo hecate Strecker, 1905
- Colias electo pseudohecate Berger, 1940
- Colias mukana Berger, 1981

=== Pierinae ===
- Colotis antevippe gavisa (Wallengren, 1857)
- Colotis antevippe zera (Lucas, 1852)
- Colotis aurigineus (Butler, 1883)
- Colotis aurora evarne (Klug, 1829)
- Colotis auxo (Lucas, 1852)
- Colotis celimene sudanicus (Aurivillius, 1905)
- Colotis elgonensis basilewskyi Berger, 1956
- Colotis euippe euippe (Linnaeus, 1758)
- Colotis euippe mediata Talbot, 1939
- Colotis euippe omphale (Godart, 1819)
- Colotis evenina casta (Gerstaecker, 1871)
- Colotis hetaera ankolensis Stoneham, 1940
- Colotis pallene (Hopffer, 1855)
- Colotis protomedia (Klug, 1829)
- Colotis regina (Trimen, 1863)
- Colotis vesta princeps Talbot, 1939
- Colotis vesta rhodesinus (Butler, 1894)
- Colotis subfasciatus ducissa (Dognin, 1891)
- Eronia cleodora Hübner, 1823
- Eronia leda (Boisduval, 1847)
- Pinacopterix eriphia wittei Berger, 1940
- Nepheronia argia (Fabricius, 1775)
- Nepheronia buquetii (Boisduval, 1836)
- Nepheronia pharis (Boisduval, 1836)
- Nepheronia thalassina verulanus (Ward, 1871)
- Leptosia alcesta alcesta (Stoll, [1782])
- Leptosia alcesta inalcesta Bernardi, 1959
- Leptosia alcesta pseudonuptilla Bernardi, 1959
- Leptosia hybrida hybrida Bernardi, 1952
- Leptosia hybrida somereni Bernardi, 1959
- Leptosia marginea (Mabille, 1890)
- Leptosia nupta pseudonupta Bernardi, 1959
- Leptosia wigginsi wigginsi (Dixey, 1915)
- Leptosia wigginsi pseudalcesta Bernardi, 1965

==== Pierini ====
- Appias epaphia (Cramer, [1779])
- Appias perlucens (Butler, 1898)
- Appias phaola intermedia Dufrane, 1948
- Appias sabina (Felder & Felder, [1865])
- Appias sylvia sylvia (Fabricius, 1775)
- Appias sylvia nyasana (Butler, 1897)
- Appias sylvia zairiensis Berger, 1981
- Pontia helice johnstonii (Crowley, 1887)
- Mylothris agathina agathina (Cramer, 1779)
- Mylothris agathina richlora Suffert, 1904
- Mylothris alberici Dufrane, 1940
- Mylothris alcuana alcuana Grünberg, 1910
- Mylothris alcuana binza Berger, 1981
- Mylothris alcuana shaba Berger, 1981
- Mylothris asphodelus Butler, 1888
- Mylothris basalis Aurivillius, 1906
- Mylothris bernice albescens Berger, 1981
- Mylothris bernice berenicides Holland, 1896
- Mylothris bernice nigrovenosa Berger, 1981
- Mylothris bernice overlaeti Berger, 1981
- Mylothris celisi Berger, 1981 (endemic)
- Mylothris chloris (Fabricius, 1775)
- Mylothris citrina holochroma Talbot, 1944
- Mylothris continua continua Talbot, 1944
- Mylothris continua maxima Berger, 1981
- Mylothris croceus croceus Butler, 1896
- Mylothris croceus ituriensis Berger, 1981
- Mylothris ducarmei Hecq, 2001 (endemic)
- Mylothris elodina diva Berger, 1954
- Mylothris elodina pelenge Berger, 1981
- Mylothris flaviana interposita Joicey & Talbot, 1921
- Mylothris hilara goma Berger, 1981
- Mylothris jacksoni Sharpe, 1891
- Mylothris kahusiana Hecq, 2001 (endemic)
- Mylothris kiwuensis kiwuensis Grünberg, 1910
- Mylothris kiwuensis rhodopoides Talbot, 1944
- Mylothris kiwuensis marielouisae Berger, 1979
- Mylothris mafuga Berger, 1981
- Mylothris nubila canescens Joicey & Talbot, 1922
- Mylothris nubila fontainei Berger, 1952
- Mylothris ochrea Berger, 1981 (endemic)
- Mylothris polychroma Berger, 1981
- Mylothris rembina (Plötz, 1880)
- Mylothris rhodope (Fabricius, 1775)
- Mylothris ruandana Strand, 1909
- Mylothris rubricosta rubricosta (Mabille, 1890)
- Mylothris rubricosta pulchra Berger, 1981
- Mylothris rueppellii rhodesiana Riley, 1921
- Mylothris sagala albissima Talbot, 1944
- Mylothris schoutedeni Berger, 1952 (endemic)
- Mylothris schumanni uniformis Talbot, 1944
- Mylothris schumanni zairiensis Berger, 1981
- Mylothris similis dollmani Riley, 1921
- Mylothris similis noel Talbot, 1944
- Mylothris sjostedti sjostedti Aurivillius, 1895
- Mylothris sjostedti hecqui Berger, 1952
- Mylothris subsolana Hecq, 2001
- Mylothris yulei Butler, 1897
- Dixeia cebron (Ward, 1871)
- Dixeia dixeyi (Neave, 1904)
- Dixeia doxo alberta (Grünberg, 1912)
- Dixeia orbona vidua (Butler, 1900)
- Dixeia pigea (Boisduval, 1836)
- Belenois aurota (Fabricius, 1793)
- Belenois calypso dentigera Butler, 1888
- Belenois calypso marlieri Berger, 1981
- Belenois calypso crawshayi Butler, 1894
- Belenois creona severina (Stoll, 1781)
- Belenois diminuta Butler, 1894
- Belenois gidica abyssinica (Lucas, 1852)
- Belenois ogygia bongeya Berger, 1981
- Belenois raffrayi extendens (Joicey & Talbot, 1927)
- Belenois rubrosignata (Weymer, 1901)
- Belenois solilucis solilucis Butler, 1874
- Belenois solilucis loveni (Aurivillius, 1921)
- Belenois subeida (Felder & Felder, 1865)
- Belenois sudanensis katalensis Berger, 1981
- Belenois sudanensis mayumbana Berger, 1981
- Belenois sudanensis pseudodentigera Berger, 1981
- Belenois theora laeta (Weymer, 1903)
- Belenois theora ratheo (Suffert, 1904)
- Belenois theuszi (Dewitz, 1889)
- Belenois thysa thysa (Hopffer, 1855)
- Belenois thysa meldolae Butler, 1872
- Belenois victoria hecqi Berger, 1953
- Belenois victoria schoutedeni Berger, 1953
- Belenois welwitschii welwitschii Rogenhofer, 1890
- Belenois welwitschii shaba Berger, 1981
- Belenois zochalia agrippinides (Holland, 1896)

== Lycaenidae ==
=== Miletinae ===
==== Liphyrini ====
- Euliphyra mirifica Holland, 1890
- Euliphyra leucyania (Hewitson, 1874)
- Aslauga aura Druce, 1913
- Aslauga imitans Libert, 1994
- Aslauga kallimoides Schultze, 1912
- Aslauga katangana (Romieux, 1937) (endemic)
- Aslauga lamborni Bethune-Baker, 1914
- Aslauga marshalli Butler, 1899
- Aslauga pandora Druce, 1913
- Aslauga prouvosti Libert & Bouyer, 1997
- Aslauga purpurascens Holland, 1890
- Aslauga vininga (Hewitson, 1875)

==== Miletini ====
- Megalopalpus angulosus Grünberg, 1910
- Megalopalpus metaleucus Karsch, 1893
- Megalopalpus simplex Röber, 1886
- Megalopalpus zymna (Westwood, 1851)
- Spalgis lemolea Druce, 1890
- Lachnocnema bibulus (Fabricius, 1793)
- Lachnocnema laches (Fabricius, 1793)
- Lachnocnema pseudobibulus Libert, 1996
- Lachnocnema sosia Libert, 1996
- Lachnocnema durbani Trimen & Bowker, 1887
- Lachnocnema intermedia Libert, 1996
- Lachnocnema ducarmei Libert, 1996 (endemic)
- Lachnocnema triangularis Libert, 1996
- Lachnocnema emperamus (Snellen, 1872)
- Lachnocnema katangae Libert, 1996 (endemic)
- Lachnocnema regularis Libert, 1996
- Lachnocnema obscura Libert, 1996 (endemic)
- Lachnocnema overlaeti Libert, 1996 (endemic)
- Lachnocnema divergens Gaede, 1915
- Lachnocnema vuattouxi Libert, 1996
- Lachnocnema reutlingeri reutlingeri Holland, 1892
- Lachnocnema reutlingeri perspicua Libert, 1996
- Lachnocnema luna Druce, 1910
- Lachnocnema brunea Libert, 1996
- Lachnocnema magna Aurivillius, 1895
- Lachnocnema exiguus Holland, 1890
- Lachnocnema disrupta Talbot, 1935

=== Poritiinae ===
==== Liptenini ====
- Alaena amazoula congoana Aurivillius, 1914
- Alaena maculata Hawker-Smith, 1933 (endemic)
- Alaena nyassa marmorata Hawker-Smith, 1933
- Alaena oberthuri Aurivillius, 1899 (endemic)
- Alaena unimaculosa Hawker-Smith, 1926
- Ptelina carnuta (Hewitson, 1873)
- Ptelina subhyalina (Joicey & Talbot, 1921) (endemic)
- Pentila maculata pardalena Druce, 1910
- Pentila maculata subochracea Hawker-Smith, 1933
- Pentila alba Dewitz, 1886
- Pentila amenaidoides (Holland, 1893)
- Pentila christina Suffert, 1904
- Pentila cloetensi cloetensi Aurivillius, 1898
- Pentila cloetensi catauga Rebel, 1914
- Pentila cloetensi latefasciata Stempffer & Bennett, 1961
- Pentila cloetensi lucayensis Schultze, 1923
- Pentila glagoessa (Holland, 1893)
- Pentila hewitsoni limbata (Holland, 1893)
- Pentila inconspicua Druce, 1910
- Pentila landbecki Stempffer & Bennett, 1961 (endemic)
- Pentila pauli alberta Hulstaert, 1924
- Pentila pauli elisabetha Hulstaert, 1924
- Pentila pauli leopardina Schultze, 1923
- Pentila pauli multiplagata Bethune-Baker, 1908
- Pentila subfuscata Hawker-Smith, 1933 (endemic)
- Pentila tachyroides tachyroides Dewitz, 1879
- Pentila tachyroides isiro Berger, 1981
- Pentila torrida (Kirby, 1887)
- Pentila umangiana umangiana Aurivillius, 1898
- Pentila umangiana connectens Hulstaert, 1924
- Pentila umangiana fontainei Stempffer & Bennett, 1961
- Pentila umangiana meridionalis Berger, 1981
- Liptenara batesi Bethune-Baker, 1915
- Liptenara hiendlmayri (Dewitz, 1887)
- Liptenara schoutedeni (Hawker-Smith, 1926) (endemic)
- Telipna acraea nigrita Talbot, 1935
- Telipna sulpitia Hulstaert, 1924
- Telipna albofasciata albofasciata Aurivillius, 1910
- Telipna albofasciata laplumei Devos, 1917
- Telipna cuypersi Libert, 2005
- Telipna plagiata Joicey & Talbot, 1921 (endemic)
- Telipna villiersi Stempffer, 1965
- Telipna centralis Libert, 2005 (endemic)
- Telipna kaputui Libert, 2005 (endemic)
- Telipna acraeoides (Grose-Smith & Kirby, 1890)
- Telipna hollandi hollandi Joicey & Talbot, 1921
- Telipna hollandi exsuperia Hulstaert, 1924
- Telipna ducarmei Libert, 2005 (endemic)
- Telipna citrimaculata citrimaculata Schultze, 1916
- Telipna citrimaculata neavei Bethune-Baker, 1926
- Telipna sanguinea (Plötz, 1880)
- Telipna consanguinea Rebel, 1914
- Telipna erica Suffert, 1904
- Telipna nyanza katangae Stempffer, 1961
- Ornipholidotos ugandae ugandae Stempffer, 1947
- Ornipholidotos ugandae goodi Libert, 2000
- Ornipholidotos gabonensis Stempffer, 1947
- Ornipholidotos ginettae Libert, 2005 (endemic)
- Ornipholidotos abriana Libert, 2005
- Ornipholidotos jolyana Libert, 2005 (endemic)
- Ornipholidotos kivu Collins & Larsen, 2000 (endemic)
- Ornipholidotos francisci Libert, 2005 (endemic)
- Ornipholidotos katangae katangae Stempffer, 1947
- Ornipholidotos katangae reducta Libert, 2005
- Ornipholidotos annae Libert, 2005
- Ornipholidotos amieti amieti Libert, 2005
- Ornipholidotos amieti angulata Libert, 2005
- Ornipholidotos overlaeti overlaeti Stempffer, 1947
- Ornipholidotos overlaeti fontainei Libert, 2005
- Ornipholidotos gemina gemina Libert, 2000
- Ornipholidotos gemina fournierae Libert, 2005
- Ornipholidotos congoensis Stempffer, 1964
- Ornipholidotos oremansi Libert, 2005 (endemic)
- Ornipholidotos jacksoni Stempffer, 1961
- Ornipholidotos ntebi (Bethune-Baker, 1906)
- Ornipholidotos nbeti Libert, 2005
- Ornipholidotos ducarmei Libert, 2005 (endemic)
- Ornipholidotos ghesquierei Libert, 2005 (endemic)
- Ornipholidotos latimargo (Hawker-Smith, 1933)
- Ornipholidotos emarginata (Hawker-Smith, 1933)
- Ornipholidotos aureliae Libert, 2005 (endemic)
- Ornipholidotos paradoxa centralis Libert, 2005
- Ornipholidotos paradoxa orientis Libert, 2005
- Ornipholidotos peucetia (Hewitson, 1866)
- Torbenia stempfferi cuypersi Libert, 2005
- Cooksonia trimeni trimeni Druce, 1905 (endemic)
- Cooksonia trimeni terpsichore Talbot, 1935 (endemic)
- Cooksonia ginettae Collins & Larsen, 2008
- Mimacraea abriana Libert & Collins, 2000
- Mimacraea charmian Grose-Smith & Kirby, 1889
- Mimacraea darwinia Butler, 1872
- Mimacraea krausei Dewitz, 1889
- Mimacraea landbecki Druce, 1910
- Mimacraea marshalli Trimen, 1898
- Mimacraea neurata Holland, 1895
- Mimacraea fulvaria Aurivillius, 1895
- Mimacraea eltringhami Druce, 1912
- Mimacraea paragora paragora Rebel, 1911
- Mimacraea paragora angulata Libert, 2000
- Mimacraea skoptoles Druce, 1907
- Mimacraea telloides Schultze, 1923
- Mimeresia debora debora (Kirby, 1890)
- Mimeresia debora barnsi (Hawker-Smith, 1933)
- Mimeresia debora deborula (Aurivillius, 1899)
- Mimeresia dinora discirubra (Talbot, 1937)
- Mimeresia drucei drucei (Stempffer, 1954)
- Mimeresia drucei ugandae (Stempffer, 1954)
- Mimeresia favillacea griseata (Talbot, 1937)
- Mimeresia moreelsi moreelsi (Aurivillius, 1901)
- Mimeresia moreelsi purpurea (Hawker-Smith, 1933)
- Mimeresia neavei (Joicey & Talbot, 1921)
- Mimeresia russulus russulus (Druce, 1910)
- Mimeresia russulus katangae (Hawker-Smith, 1926)
- Liptena albomacula Hawker-Smith, 1933
- Liptena amabilis Schultze, 1923
- Liptena bergeri Stempffer, Bennett & May, 1974 (endemic)
- Liptena congoana Hawker-Smith, 1933
- Liptena decipiens etoumbi Stempffer, Bennett & May, 1974
- Liptena decipiens leucostola (Holland, 1890)
- Liptena despecta (Holland, 1890)
- Liptena eukrines Druce, 1905
- Liptena fatima (Kirby, 1890)
- Liptena flavicans aequatorialis Stempffer, 1956
- Liptena flavicans praeusta Schultze, 1917
- Liptena fontainei Stempffer, Bennett & May, 1974 (endemic)
- Liptena fulvicans Hawker-Smith, 1933 (endemic)
- Liptena homeyeri Dewitz, 1884
- Liptena lualaba Berger, 1981
- Liptena modesta (Kirby, 1890)
- Liptena mwagensis Dufrane, 1953 (endemic)
- Liptena nigromarginata Stempffer, 1961
- Liptena opaca gabunica Stempffer, Bennett & May, 1974
- Liptena opaca sankuru Stempffer, Bennett & May, 1974
- Liptena orubrum tripunctata (Grose-Smith & Kirby, 1894)
- Liptena overlaeti Stempffer, Bennett & May, 1974 (endemic)
- Liptena praestans congoensis Schultze, 1923
- Liptena rubromacula Hawker-Smith, 1933
- Liptena subsuffusa Hawker-Smith, 1933 (endemic)
- Liptena turbata (Kirby, 1890)
- Liptena undularis Hewitson, 1866
- Liptena xanthostola xanthostola (Holland, 1890)
- Liptena xanthostola xantha (Grose-Smith, 1901)
- Obania subvariegata aliquantum (Druce, 1910)
- Obania tulliana (Grose-Smith, 1901) (endemic)
- Kakumia ideoides (Dewitz, 1887)
- Tetrarhanis ilala etoumbi (Stempffer, 1964)
- Tetrarhanis ilma ilma (Hewitson, 1873)
- Tetrarhanis ilma lathyi (Joicey & Talbot, 1921)
- Tetrarhanis rougeoti (Stempffer, 1954)
- Tetrarhanis schoutedeni (Berger, 1954)
- Tetrarhanis stempfferi (Berger, 1954)
- Falcuna dorotheae Stempffer & Bennett, 1963
- Falcuna hollandi hollandi (Aurivillius, 1899)
- Falcuna hollandi nigricans Stempffer & Bennett, 1963
- Falcuna iturina Stempffer & Bennett, 1963
- Falcuna kasai Stempffer & Bennett, 1963 (endemic)
- Falcuna margarita (Suffert, 1904)
- Falcuna orientalis bwamba Stempffer & Bennett, 1963
- Falcuna overlaeti Stempffer & Bennett, 1963 (endemic)
- Falcuna semliki Stempffer & Bennett, 1963 (endemic)
- Falcuna synesia (Hulstaert, 1924)
- Larinopoda lagyra lagyra (Hewitson, 1866)
- Larinopoda lagyra reducta Berger, 1981
- Larinopoda lircaea (Hewitson, 1866)
- Larinopoda tera (Hewitson, 1873)
- Micropentila adelgitha (Hewitson, 1874)
- Micropentila adelgunda (Staudinger, 1892)
- Micropentila brunnea centralis Bennett, 1966
- Micropentila bunyoro Stempffer & Bennett, 1965
- Micropentila dorothea Bethune-Baker, 1903
- Micropentila fontainei Stempffer & Bennett, 1965
- Micropentila katangana Stempffer & Bennett, 1965 (endemic)
- Micropentila sankuru Stempffer & Bennett, 1965 (endemic)
- Micropentila ugandae Hawker-Smith, 1933
- Micropentila victoriae Stempffer & Bennett, 1965
- Pseuderesia eleaza eleaza (Hewitson, 1873)
- Pseuderesia eleaza katera Stempffer, 1961
- Pseuderesia mapongua (Holland, 1893)
- Eresina bergeri Stempffer, 1956
- Eresina bilinea Talbot, 1935
- Eresina fontainei Stempffer, 1956
- Eresina katangana Stempffer, 1956
- Eresina rougeoti Stempffer, 1956
- Eresina toroensis Joicey & Talbot, 1921
- Eresiomera campbelli Collins & Larsen, 1998
- Eresiomera isca (Hewitson, 1873)
- Eresiomera magnimacula (Rebel, 1914)
- Eresiomera nancy Collins & Larsen, 1998
- Eresiomera phaeochiton (Grünberg, 1910)
- Citrinophila erastus erastus (Hewitson, 1866)
- Citrinophila erastus pallida Hawker-Smith, 1933
- Citrinophila tenera (Kirby, 1887)
- Citrinophila terias Joicey & Talbot, 1921
- Citrinophila unipunctata Bethune-Baker, 1908
- Argyrocheila inundifera Hawker-Smith, 1933
- Argyrocheila undifera Staudinger, 1892
- Argyrocheila ugandae Hawker-Smith, 1933
- Baliochila barnesi Stempffer & Bennett, 1953
- Baliochila neavei Stempffer & Bennett, 1953
- Baliochila hildegarda (Kirby, 1887)
- Cnodontes vansomereni Stempffer & Bennett, 1953
- Cnodontes bouyeri Kielland, 1994 (endemic)

==== Epitolini ====
- Toxochitona gerda (Kirby, 1890)
- Toxochitona sankuru Stempffer, 1961
- Iridana euprepes (Druce, 1905) (endemic)
- Iridana hypocala Eltringham, 1929
- Iridana incredibilis (Staudinger, 1891)
- Iridana marina Talbot, 1935
- Iridana rougeoti Stempffer, 1964
- Teratoneura congoensis Stempffer, 1954
- Epitola urania Kirby, 1887
- Epitola uranioides uranoides Libert, 1999
- Cerautola adolphifriderici (Schultze, 1911)
- Cerautola ceraunia (Hewitson, 1873)
- Cerautola crowleyi holochroma (Berger, 1981)
- Cerautola crowleyi leucographa Libert, 1999
- Cerautola miranda vidua (Talbot, 1935)
- Cerautola semibrunnea (Bethune-Baker, 1916)
- Cerautola decellei (Stempffer, 1956) (endemic)
- Cerautola hewitsonioides (Hawker-Smith, 1933)
- Geritola cyanea (Jackson, 1964)
- Geritola dubia (Jackson, 1964)
- Geritola gerina (Hewitson, 1878)
- Geritola goodii (Holland, 1890)
- Geritola liana (Roche, 1954)
- Geritola subargentea (Jackson, 1964)
- Stempfferia carcassoni Jackson, 1962
- Stempfferia annae Libert, 1999
- Stempfferia badura badura (Kirby, 1890)
- Stempfferia badura contrasta Libert, 1999
- Stempfferia cercene (Hewitson, 1873)
- Stempfferia cercenoides (Holland, 1890)
- Stempfferia ciconia mongiro (Jackson, 1968)
- Stempfferia cinerea (Berger, 1981)
- Stempfferia coerulea (Jackson, 1962)
- Stempfferia congoana (Aurivillius, 1923)
- Stempfferia flavoantennata (Roche, 1954)
- Stempfferia ginettae ginettae Libert, 1999
- Stempfferia ginettae meridionalis Libert, 1999
- Stempfferia gordoni (Druce, 1903)
- Stempfferia insulana (Aurivillius, 1923)
- Stempfferia iturina (Joicey & Talbot, 1921)
- Stempfferia magnifica (Jackson, 1964)
- Stempfferia marginata (Kirby, 1887)
- Stempfferia michelae centralis Libert, 1999
- Stempfferia suzannae (Berger, 1981) (endemic)
- Stempfferia sylviae Libert, 1999
- Stempfferia tumentia (Druce, 1910)
- Stempfferia uniformis (Kirby, 1887)
- Stempfferia zelza (Hewitson, 1873)
- Cephetola aureliae Libert, 1999 (endemic)
- Cephetola barnsi Libert, 1999 (endemic)
- Cephetola catuna (Kirby, 1890)
- Cephetola cephena cephena (Hewitson, 1873)
- Cephetola cephena entebbeana (Bethune-Baker, 1926)
- Cephetola ducarmei Libert, 1999 (endemic)
- Cephetola eliasis angustata Libert & Collins, 1999
- Cephetola eliasis epitolina Libert & Collins, 1999
- Cephetola ghesquierei (Roche, 1954)
- Cephetola kakamegae Libert & Collins, 1999
- Cephetola katerae (Jackson, 1962)
- Cephetola kiellandi (Libert & Congdon, 1998)
- Cephetola maculata (Hawker-Smith, 1926)
- Cephetola nigra (Bethune-Baker, 1903)
- Cephetola orientalis (Roche, 1954)
- Cephetola overlaeti Libert, 1999 (endemic)
- Cephetola pinodes budduana (Talbot, 1937)
- Cephetola subgriseata (Jackson, 1964)
- Cephetola sublustris (Bethune-Baker, 1904)
- Cephetola vinalli (Talbot, 1935)
- Cephetola viridana (Joicey & Talbot, 1921)
- Deloneura subfusca Hawker-Smith, 1933
- Neaveia lamborni orientalis Jackson, 1962
- Epitolina dispar (Kirby, 1887)
- Epitolina melissa (Druce, 1888)
- Epitolina catori ugandae Jackson, 1962
- Hypophytala henleyi (Kirby, 1890)
- Hypophytala hyetta (Hewitson, 1873)
- Hypophytala reducta (Aurivillius, 1923)
- Hypophytala vansomereni (Jackson, 1964)
- Phytala elais ugandae Jackson, 1964
- Neoepitola barombiensis (Kirby, 1890)
- Aethiopana honorius (Fabricius, 1793)
- Hewitsonia congoensis Joicey & Talbot, 1921
- Hewitsonia inexpectata Bouyer, 1997
- Hewitsonia intermedia Jackson, 1962
- Hewitsonia kirbyi kirbyi Dewitz, 1879
- Hewitsonia kirbyi preussi Staudinger, 1891
- Hewitsonia magdalenae Stempffer, 1951 (endemic)
- Hewitsonia ugandae Jackson, 1962
- Powellana cottoni Bethune-Baker, 1908

=== Aphnaeinae ===
- Pseudaletis agrippina Druce, 1888
- Pseudaletis camarensis depuncta Libert, 2007
- Pseudaletis michelae Libert, 2007
- Pseudaletis clymenus (Druce, 1885)
- Pseudaletis lusambo Stempffer, 1961
- Pseudaletis zebra Holland, 1891
- Pseudaletis rileyi Libert, 2007
- Pseudaletis taeniata Libert, 2007
- Pseudaletis ducarmei Libert, 2007 (endemic)
- Pseudaletis busoga van Someren, 1939
- Pseudaletis antimachus (Staudinger, 1888)
- Pseudaletis mazanguli Neave, 1910
- Pseudaletis batesi zairensis Libert, 2007
- Lipaphnaeus aderna pan (Talbot, 1935)
- Lipaphnaeus eustorgia (Hulstaert, 1924)
- Lipaphnaeus leonina bitje (Druce, 1910)
- Lipaphnaeus leonina loxura (Rebel, 1914)
- Chloroselas overlaeti Stempffer, 1956
- Cigaritis apelles (Oberthür, 1878)
- Cigaritis apuleia (Hulstaert, 1924)
- Cigaritis bergeri (Bouyer, 2003) (endemic)
- Cigaritis brunnea (Jackson, 1966)
- Cigaritis crustaria (Holland, 1890)
- Cigaritis cynica (Riley, 1921)
- Cigaritis dufranei (Bouyer, 1991)
- Cigaritis ella (Hewitson, 1865)
- Cigaritis hassoni (Bouyer, 2003) (endemic)
- Cigaritis homeyeri (Dewitz, 1887)
- Cigaritis modestus heathi (d'Abrera, 1980)
- Cigaritis montana (Joicey & Talbot, 1924) (endemic)
- Cigaritis nairobiensis (Sharpe, 1904)
- Cigaritis overlaeti (Bouyer, 1998)
- Cigaritis pinheyi (Heath, 1983)
- Cigaritis shaba (Bouyer, 1991) (endemic)
- Cigaritis trimeni congolanus (Dufrane, 1954)
- Zeritis fontainei Stempffer, 1956
- Zeritis sorhagenii (Dewitz, 1879)
- Axiocerses harpax efulena Clench, 1963
- Axiocerses harpax ugandana Clench, 1963
- Axiocerses tjoane rubescens Henning & Henning, 1996
- Axiocerses bambana orichalcea Henning & Henning, 1996
- Axiocerses amanga (Westwood, 1881)
- Erikssonia cooksoni Druce, 1905 (endemic)
- Aphnaeus adamsi Stempffer, 1954
- Aphnaeus affinis Riley, 1921
- Aphnaeus argyrocyclus Holland, 1890
- Aphnaeus asterius Plötz, 1880
- Aphnaeus chapini (Holland, 1920)
- Aphnaeus charboneli Bouyer & Libert, 1996
- Aphnaeus erikssoni Trimen, 1891
- Aphnaeus herbuloti Stempffer, 1971
- Aphnaeus marshalli Neave, 1910
- Aphnaeus orcas (Drury, 1782)
- Aphnaeus questiauxi Aurivillius, 1903

=== Theclinae ===
- Myrina sharpei sharpei Bethune-Baker, 1906
- Myrina sharpei fontainei Stempffer, 1961
- Myrina silenus (Fabricius, 1775)
- Oxylides albata (Aurivillius, 1895)
- Oxylides bella Aurivillius, 1899 (endemic)
- Oxylides binza Berger, 1981 (endemic)
- Oxylides feminina (Sharpe, 1904)
- Oxylides stempfferi Berger, 1981 (endemic)
- Oxylides gloveri Hawker-Smith, 1929
- Syrmoptera homeyerii (Dewitz, 1879)
- Syrmoptera melanomitra melanomitra Karsch, 1895
- Syrmoptera melanomitra nivea Joicey & Talbot, 1924
- Syrmoptera mixtura (Hulstaert, 1924) (endemic)
- Dapidodigma demeter nuptus Clench, 1961
- Hypolycaena antifaunus antifaunus (Westwood, 1851)
- Hypolycaena antifaunus latimacula (Joicey & Talbot, 1921)
- Hypolycaena auricostalis (Butler, 1897)
- Hypolycaena buxtoni spurcus Talbot, 1929
- Hypolycaena dubia Aurivillius, 1895
- Hypolycaena hatita hatita Hewitson, 1865
- Hypolycaena hatita japhusa Riley, 1921
- Hypolycaena hatita ugandae Sharpe, 1904
- Hypolycaena jacksoni Bethune-Baker, 1906
- Hypolycaena lebona lebona (Hewitson, 1865)
- Hypolycaena lebona davenporti Larsen, 1997
- Hypolycaena liara liara Druce, 1890
- Hypolycaena liara plana Talbot, 1935
- Hypolycaena naara Hewitson, 1873
- Hypolycaena nigra Bethune-Baker, 1914
- Hypolycaena pachalica Butler, 1888
- Hypolycaena schubotzi Aurivillius, 1923 (endemic)
- Hypolycaena similis Dufrane, 1945 (endemic)
- Hemiolaus caeculus (Hopffer, 1855)
- Leptomyrina makala Bethune-Baker, 1908
- Iolaus bilineata Bethune-Baker, 1908 (endemic)
- Iolaus bolissus Hewitson, 1873
- Iolaus agnes Aurivillius, 1898
- Iolaus aurivillii Röber, 1900
- Iolaus bakeri (Riley, 1928)
- Iolaus bellina exquisita (Riley, 1928)
- Iolaus coelestis Bethune-Baker, 1926
- Iolaus creta Hewitson, 1878
- Iolaus cytaeis cytaeis Hewitson, 1875
- Iolaus cytaeis caerulea (Riley, 1928)
- Iolaus farquharsoni (Bethune-Baker, 1922)
- Iolaus fontainei (Stempffer, 1956)
- Iolaus frater (Joicey & Talbot, 1921)
- Iolaus hemicyanus barnsi (Joicey & Talbot, 1921)
- Iolaus iasis Hewitson, 1865
- Iolaus maesa (Hewitson, 1862)
- Iolaus mafugae (Stempffer & Bennett, 1959)
- Iolaus neavei (Druce, 1910)
- Iolaus pollux pollux Aurivillius, 1895
- Iolaus pollux albocaerulea (Riley, 1929)
- Iolaus sappirus (Druce, 1902)
- Iolaus sibella (Druce, 1910)
- Iolaus sidus Trimen, 1864
- Iolaus silanus silenus (Hawker-Smith, 1928)
- Iolaus stenogrammica (Riley, 1928)
- Iolaus violacea (Riley, 1928)
- Iolaus pallene (Wallengren, 1857)
- Iolaus trimeni Wallengren, 1875
- Iolaus iulus Hewitson, 1869
- Iolaus jamesoni (Druce, 1891)
- Iolaus shaba Collins & Larsen, 1995 (endemic)
- Iolaus parasilanus parasilanus Rebel, 1914
- Iolaus parasilanus divaricatus (Riley, 1928)
- Iolaus parasilanus mabillei (Riley, 1928)
- Iolaus ismenias (Klug, 1834)
- Iolaus alcibiades Kirby, 1871
- Iolaus paneperata Druce, 1890
- Iolaus poecilaon (Riley, 1928)
- Iolaus aequatorialis (Stempffer & Bennett, 1958)
- Iolaus bergeri (Stempffer, 1953) (endemic)
- Iolaus caesareus Aurivillius, 1895
- Iolaus crawshayi littoralis (Stempffer & Bennett, 1958)
- Iolaus iturensis (Joicey & Talbot, 1921)
- Iolaus ndolae (Stempffer & Bennett, 1958)
- Iolaus silarus Druce, 1885
- Iolaus timon timon (Fabricius, 1787)
- Iolaus timon congoensis (Joicey & Talbot, 1921)
- Iolaus catori Bethune-Baker, 1904
- Iolaus kyabobo Larsen, 1996
- Stugeta bowkeri maria Suffert, 1904
- Pilodeudorix mimeta mimeta (Karsch, 1895)
- Pilodeudorix mimeta angusta Libert, 2004
- Pilodeudorix ula (Karsch, 1895)
- Pilodeudorix virgata (Druce, 1891)
- Pilodeudorix anetia (Hulstaert, 1924)
- Pilodeudorix angelita (Suffert, 1904)
- Pilodeudorix aruma simplex (Schultze, 1917)
- Pilodeudorix bemba (Neave, 1910)
- Pilodeudorix canescens (Joicey & Talbot, 1921)
- Pilodeudorix elealodes (Bethune-Baker, 1908) (endemic)
- Pilodeudorix kafuensis (Neave, 1910)
- Pilodeudorix leonina indentata Libert, 2004
- Pilodeudorix mera mera (Hewitson, 1873
- Pilodeudorix mera kinumbensis (Dufrane, 1945)
- Pilodeudorix otraeda genuba (Hewitson, 1875)
- Pilodeudorix tenuivittata (Stempffer, 1951) (endemic)
- Pilodeudorix camerona camerona (Plötz, 1880)
- Pilodeudorix camerona katanga (Clench, 1965)
- Pilodeudorix congoana congoana (Aurivillius, 1923)
- Pilodeudorix congoana orientalis (Stempffer, 1957)
- Pilodeudorix kohli (Aurivillius, 1921)
- Pilodeudorix zela (Hewitson, 1869)
- Pilodeudorix zelomina (Rebel, 1914)
- Pilodeudorix hugoi Libert, 2004
- Pilodeudorix catalla (Karsch, 1895)
- Pilodeudorix corruscans (Aurivillius, 1898)
- Pilodeudorix deritas (Hewitson, 1874)
- Pilodeudorix ducarmei (Collins & Larsen, 1998) (endemic)
- Pilodeudorix fumata (Stempffer, 1954)
- Pilodeudorix kiellandi (Congdon & Collins, 1998)
- Pilodeudorix pasteon (Druce, 1910)
- Pilodeudorix pseudoderitas (Stempffer, 1964)
- Pilodeudorix violetta (Aurivillius, 1897)
- Paradeudorix cobaltina (Stempffer, 1964)
- Paradeudorix eleala (Hewitson, 1865)
- Paradeudorix ituri (Bethune-Baker, 1908)
- Paradeudorix marginata (Stempffer, 1962)
- Paradeudorix moyambina (Bethune-Baker, 1904)
- Paradeudorix petersi (Stempffer & Bennett, 1956)
- Hypomyrina nomenia extensa Libert, 2004
- Hypomyrina mimetica Libert, 2004
- Hypomyrina fournierae Gabriel, 1939
- Deudorix badhami Carcasson, 1961
- Deudorix batikelides Holland, 1920 (endemic)
- Deudorix dinochares Grose-Smith, 1887
- Deudorix dinomenes diomedes Jackson, 1966
- Deudorix diocles Hewitson, 1869
- Deudorix edwardsi Gabriel, 1939
- Deudorix kayonza Stempffer, 1956
- Deudorix lorisona lorisona (Hewitson, 1862)
- Deudorix lorisona baronica Ungemach, 1932
- Deudorix nicephora Hulstaert, 1924
- Deudorix odana Druce, 1887
- Capys catharus Riley, 1932

=== Lycaeninae ===
- Lycaena phlaeas ethiopica (Poulton, 1922)

=== Polyommatinae ===
==== Lycaenesthini ====
- Anthene afra (Bethune-Baker, 1910)
- Anthene alberta (Bethune-Baker, 1910)
- Anthene bakeri (Druce, 1910) (endemic)
- Anthene bipuncta (Joicey & Talbot, 1921)
- Anthene contrastata mashuna (Stevenson, 1937)
- Anthene crawshayi (Butler, 1899)
- Anthene definita (Butler, 1899)
- Anthene discimacula (Joicey & Talbot, 1921) (endemic)
- Anthene hobleyi kigezi Stempffer, 1961
- Anthene indefinita (Bethune-Baker, 1910)
- Anthene irumu (Stempffer, 1948)
- Anthene ituria (Bethune-Baker, 1910)
- Anthene kampala (Bethune-Baker, 1910)
- Anthene katera Talbot, 1937
- Anthene lachares lachares (Hewitson, 1878)
- Anthene lachares toroensis Stempffer, 1947
- Anthene larydas (Cramer, 1780)
- Anthene leptines (Hewitson, 1874)
- Anthene ligures (Hewitson, 1874)
- Anthene liodes (Hewitson, 1874)
- Anthene locuples (Grose-Smith, 1898)
- Anthene lunulata (Trimen, 1894)
- Anthene lysicles (Hewitson, 1874)
- Anthene mahota (Grose-Smith, 1887)
- Anthene makala (Bethune-Baker, 1910)
- Anthene nigropunctata (Bethune-Baker, 1910)
- Anthene onias (Hulstaert, 1924) (endemic)
- Anthene otacilia (Trimen, 1868)
- Anthene pyroptera (Aurivillius, 1895)
- Anthene ramnika d'Abrera, 1980
- Anthene rubricinctus rubricinctus (Holland, 1891)
- Anthene rubricinctus anadema (Druce, 1905)
- Anthene rubricinctus jeanneli Stempffer, 1961
- Anthene rufomarginata (Bethune-Baker, 1910) (endemic)
- Anthene ruwenzoricus (Grünberg, 1911) (endemic)
- Anthene schoutedeni (Hulstaert, 1924)
- Anthene scintillula (Holland, 1891)
- Anthene starki Larsen, 2005
- Anthene sylvanus sylvanus (Drury, 1773)
- Anthene sylvanus niveus Stempffer, 1954
- Anthene versatilis (Bethune-Baker, 1910)
- Anthene xanthopoecilus (Holland, 1893)
- Anthene zenkeri (Karsch, 1895)
- Anthene lamprocles (Hewitson, 1878)
- Anthene aequatorialis Stempffer, 1962 (endemic)
- Anthene chryseostictus (Bethune-Baker, 1910)
- Anthene likouala Stempffer, 1962
- Anthene lusones (Hewitson, 1874)
- Anthene staudingeri (Grose-Smith & Kirby, 1894)
- Anthene fasciatus (Aurivillius, 1895)
- Anthene hades (Bethune-Baker, 1910)
- Anthene inconspicua (Druce, 1910)
- Anthene kamilila (Bethune-Baker, 1910)
- Anthene lacides (Hewitson, 1874)
- Anthene lamias lamias (Hewitson, 1878)
- Anthene lamias katerae (d'Abrera, 1980)
- Anthene lucretilis albipicta (Talbot, 1935)
- Anthene lutzi (Holland, 1920) (endemic)
- Anthene nigeriae (Aurivillius, 1905)
- Anthene obscura (Druce, 1910)
- Anthene rufoplagata (Bethune-Baker, 1910)
- Cupidesthes albida (Aurivillius, 1923) (endemic)
- Cupidesthes arescopa arescopa Bethune-Baker, 1910
- Cupidesthes arescopa orientalis (Stempffer, 1962)
- Cupidesthes cuprifascia Joicey & Talbot, 1921
- Cupidesthes leonina (Bethune-Baker, 1903)
- Cupidesthes lithas (Druce, 1890)
- Cupidesthes minor Joicey & Talbot, 1921 (endemic)
- Cupidesthes thyrsis (Kirby, 1878)
- Cupidesthes ysobelae Jackson, 1966

==== Polyommatini ====
- Cupidopsis cissus extensa Libert, 2003
- Cupidopsis jobates (Hopffer, 1855)
- Pseudonacaduba aethiops (Mabille, 1877)
- Uranothauma antinorii felthami (Stevenson, 1934)
- Uranothauma cordatus (Sharpe, 1892)
- Uranothauma delatorum Heron, 1909
- Uranothauma falkensteini (Dewitz, 1879)
- Uranothauma heritsia heritsia (Hewitson, 1876)
- Uranothauma heritsia intermedia (Tite, 1958)
- Uranothauma heritsia virgo (Butler, 1896)
- Uranothauma lunifer (Rebel, 1914)
- Uranothauma nubifer (Trimen, 1895)
- Uranothauma poggei (Dewitz, 1879)
- Uranothauma vansomereni Stempffer, 1951
- Phlyaria cyara cyara (Hewitson, 1876)
- Phlyaria cyara tenuimarginata (Grünberg, 1908)
- Cacyreus audeoudi Stempffer, 1936
- Cacyreus tespis (Herbst, 1804)
- Cacyreus virilis Stempffer, 1936
- Harpendyreus aequatorialis vulcanica (Joicey & Talbot, 1924)
- Harpendyreus argenteostriata Stempffer, 1961
- Harpendyreus kisaba (Joicey & Talbot, 1921)
- Harpendyreus major (Joicey & Talbot, 1924)
- Harpendyreus marlieri Stempffer, 1961 (endemic)
- Harpendyreus marungensis (Joicey & Talbot, 1924)
- Harpendyreus reginaldi Heron, 1909
- Leptotes cassioides (Capronnier, 1889) (endemic)
- Leptotes marginalis (Stempffer, 1944)
- Leptotes pulchra (Murray, 1874)
- Tuxentius calice (Hopffer, 1855)
- Tuxentius carana (Hewitson, 1876)
- Tuxentius margaritaceus (Sharpe, 1892)
- Tuxentius melaena (Trimen & Bowker, 1887)
- Tarucus sybaris linearis (Aurivillius, 1924)
- Zintha hintza (Trimen, 1864)
- Zizina antanossa (Mabille, 1877)
- Actizera stellata (Trimen, 1883)
- Azanus isis (Drury, 1773)
- Eicochrysops eicotrochilus Bethune-Baker, 1924
- Eicochrysops fontainei Stempffer, 1961 (endemic)
- Euchrysops albistriata (Capronnier, 1889)
- Euchrysops barkeri (Trimen, 1893)
- Euchrysops crawshayi fontainei Stempffer, 1967
- Euchrysops katangae Bethune-Baker, 1923
- Euchrysops mauensis Bethune-Baker, 1923
- Euchrysops reducta Hulstaert, 1924
- Euchrysops severini Hulstaert, 1924
- Euchrysops subpallida Bethune-Baker, 1923
- Euchrysops unigemmata (Butler, 1895)
- Thermoniphas alberici (Dufrane, 1945)
- Thermoniphas distincta (Talbot, 1935)
- Thermoniphas fontainei Stempffer, 1956
- Thermoniphas fumosa Stempffer, 1952
- Thermoniphas plurilimbata plurilimbata Karsch, 1895
- Thermoniphas plurilimbata rutshurensis (Joicey & Talbot, 1921)
- Thermoniphas togara (Plötz, 1880)
- Thermoniphas kamitugensis (Dufrane, 1945) (endemic)
- Oboronia albicosta (Gaede, 1916)
- Oboronia guessfeldti (Dewitz, 1879)
- Oboronia ornata vestalis (Aurivillius, 1895)
- Oboronia pseudopunctatus (Strand, 1912)
- Oboronia punctatus (Dewitz, 1879)
- Lepidochrysops anerius (Hulstaert, 1924)
- Lepidochrysops chloauges (Bethune-Baker, [1923])
- Lepidochrysops cinerea (Bethune-Baker, [1923])
- Lepidochrysops cupreus (Neave, 1910)
- Lepidochrysops glauca (Trimen & Bowker, 1887)
- Lepidochrysops loveni loveni (Aurivillius, 1922)
- Lepidochrysops loveni kivuensis (Joicey & Talbot, 1921)
- Lepidochrysops pampolis (Druce, 1905)
- Lepidochrysops plebeia proclus (Hulstaert, 1924)
- Lepidochrysops polydialecta (Bethune-Baker, [1923])
- Lepidochrysops skotios (Druce, 1905)
- Lepidochrysops solwezii (Bethune-Baker, [1923])
- Lepidochrysops stormsi (Robbe, 1892)
- Lepidochrysops victoriae occidentalis Libert & Collins, 2001

== Riodinidae ==
=== Nemeobiinae ===
- Abisara tantalus caerulea Carpenter & Jackson, 1950
- Abisara tantalus cyanis Callaghan, 2003
- Abisara intermedia Aurivillius, 1895
- Abisara caeca caeca Rebel, 1914
- Abisara caeca semicaeca Riley, 1932
- Abisara rutherfordii cyclops Riley, 1932
- Abisara gerontes gabunica Riley, 1932
- Abisara dewitzi Aurivillius, 1898
- Abisara rogersi rogersi Druce, 1878
- Abisara rogersi simulacris Riley, 1932
- Abisara neavei neavei Riley, 1932
- Abisara neavei dollmani Riley, 1932
- Abisara neavei kivuensis Riley, 1932

== Nymphalidae ==
=== Libytheinae ===
- Libythea labdaca Westwood, 1851

=== Danainae ===
==== Danaini ====
- Danaus chrysippus (Linnaeus, 1758)
- Tirumala formosa mercedonia (Karsch, 1894)
- Tirumala petiverana (Doubleday, 1847)
- Amauris niavius (Linnaeus, 1758)
- Amauris albimaculata magnimacula Rebel, 1914
- Amauris crawshayi oscarus Thurau, 1904
- Amauris crawshayi simulator Talbot, 1926
- Amauris dannfelti restricta Talbot, 1940
- Amauris echeria katangae Neave, 1910
- Amauris echeria mpala Talbot, 1940
- Amauris echeria terrena Talbot, 1940
- Amauris ellioti Butler, 1895
- Amauris hecate (Butler, 1866)
- Amauris hyalites Butler, 1874
- Amauris inferna inferna Butler, 1871
- Amauris inferna discus Talbot, 1940
- Amauris inferna grogani Sharpe, 1901
- Amauris vashti (Butler, 1869)

=== Satyrinae ===
==== Elymniini ====
- Elymniopsis bammakoo bammakoo (Westwood, [1851])
- Elymniopsis bammakoo rattrayi (Sharpe, 1902)

==== Melanitini ====
- Gnophodes betsimena parmeno Doubleday, 1849
- Gnophodes chelys (Fabricius, 1793)
- Gnophodes grogani Sharpe, 1901
- Melanitis ansorgei Rothschild, 1904
- Melanitis libya Distant, 1882
- Aphysoneura pigmentaria dewittei Bouyer, 2001
- Aphysoneura pigmentaria semilatilimba Kielland, 1989
- Aphysoneura scapulifascia scapulifascia Joicey & Talbot, 1922
- Aphysoneura scapulifascia zairensis Kielland, 1989

==== Satyrini ====
- Bicyclus albocincta (Rebel, 1914) (endemic)
- Bicyclus alboplaga (Rebel, 1914)
- Bicyclus analis (Aurivillius, 1895)
- Bicyclus angulosa angulosa (Butler, 1868)
- Bicyclus angulosa selousi (Trimen, 1895)
- Bicyclus anynana centralis Condamin, 1968
- Bicyclus auricruda fulgidus Fox, 1963
- Bicyclus aurivillii (Butler, 1896)
- Bicyclus buea (Strand, 1912)
- Bicyclus campina (Aurivillius, 1901)
- Bicyclus campus (Karsch, 1893)
- Bicyclus cooksoni (Druce, 1905)
- Bicyclus cottrelli (van Son, 1952)
- Bicyclus dentata (Sharpe, 1898)
- Bicyclus dorothea (Cramer, 1779)
- Bicyclus dubia (Aurivillius, 1893)
- Bicyclus ena (Hewitson, 1877)
- Bicyclus ephorus bergeri Condamin, 1965
- Bicyclus evadne elionias (Hewitson, 1866)
- Bicyclus golo (Aurivillius, 1893)
- Bicyclus graueri (Rebel, 1914)
- Bicyclus hewitsoni (Doumet, 1861)
- Bicyclus hyperanthus (Bethune-Baker, 1908)
- Bicyclus iccius (Hewitson, 1865)
- Bicyclus ignobilis eurini Condamin & Fox, 1963
- Bicyclus istaris (Plötz, 1880)
- Bicyclus italus (Hewitson, 1865)
- Bicyclus jefferyi Fox, 1963
- Bicyclus lamani (Aurivillius, 1900)
- Bicyclus madetes carola d'Abrera, 1980
- Bicyclus mandanes Hewitson, 1873
- Bicyclus matuta matuta (Karsch, 1894)
- Bicyclus matuta idjwiensis Condamin, 1965
- Bicyclus medontias (Hewitson, 1873)
- Bicyclus mesogena (Karsch, 1894)
- Bicyclus milyas (Hewitson, 1864)
- Bicyclus mollitia (Karsch, 1895)
- Bicyclus moyses Condamin & Fox, 1964
- Bicyclus nachtetis Condamin, 1965
- Bicyclus neustetteri (Rebel, 1914)
- Bicyclus persimilis (Joicey & Talbot, 1921)
- Bicyclus procora (Karsch, 1893)
- Bicyclus rhacotis (Hewitson, 1866)
- Bicyclus sambulos (Hewitson, 1877)
- Bicyclus martius sanaos (Hewitson, 1866)
- Bicyclus sandace (Hewitson, 1877)
- Bicyclus saussurei saussurei (Dewitz, 1879)
- Bicyclus saussurei angustus Condamin, 1970
- Bicyclus sciathis (Hewitson, 1866)
- Bicyclus sebetus (Hewitson, 1877)
- Bicyclus smithi smithi (Aurivillius, 1899)
- Bicyclus smithi eurypterus Condamin, 1965
- Bicyclus sophrosyne sophrosyne (Plötz, 1880)
- Bicyclus sophrosyne overlaeti Condamin, 1965
- Bicyclus suffusa suffusa (Riley, 1921)
- Bicyclus suffusa ituriensis Condamin, 1970
- Bicyclus sweadneri Fox, 1963
- Bicyclus taenias (Hewitson, 1877)
- Bicyclus technatis (Hewitson, 1877)
- Bicyclus trilophus trilophus (Rebel, 1914)
- Bicyclus trilophus jacksoni Condamin, 1961
- Bicyclus vansoni Condamin, 1965
- Bicyclus vulgaris (Butler, 1868)
- Bicyclus xeneas (Hewitson, 1866)
- Bicyclus xeneoides Condamin, 1961
- Hallelesis asochis congoensis (Joicey & Talbot, 1921)
- Heteropsis centralis (Aurivillius, 1903)
- Heteropsis eliasis (Hewitson, 1866)
- Heteropsis perspicua (Trimen, 1873)
- Heteropsis phaea phaea (Karsch, 1894)
- Heteropsis phaea ignota (Libert, 2006)
- Heteropsis simonsii (Butler, 1877)
- Heteropsis teratia (Karsch, 1894)
- Heteropsis ubenica ugandica (Kielland, 1994)
- Heteropsis peitho (Plötz, 1880)
- Heteropsis nigrescens (Bethune-Baker, 1908)
- Ypthima albida albida Butler, 1888
- Ypthima albida uniformis Bartel, 1905
- Ypthima condamini Kielland, 1982
- Ypthima congoana Overlaet, 1955
- Ypthima diplommata Overlaet, 1954
- Ypthima doleta Kirby, 1880
- Ypthima granulosa Butler, 1883
- Ypthima impura Elwes & Edwards, 1893
- Ypthima praestans Overlaet, 1954
- Ypthima pulchra Overlaet, 1954
- Ypthima pupillaris pupillaris Butler, 1888
- Ypthima pupillaris obscurata Kielland, 1982
- Ypthima recta Overlaet, 1955
- Ypthima rhodesiana Carcasson, 1961
- Mashuna upemba (Overlaet, 1955)
- Neocoenyra cooksoni Druce, 1907
- Neocoenyra duplex Butler, 1886
- Neocoenyra fulleborni Thurau, 1903
- Neocoenyra kivuensis Seydel, 1929
- Neocoenyra ypthimoides Butler, 1894
- Physcaeneura pione Godman, 1880

=== Charaxinae ===
==== Charaxini ====
- Charaxes fulvescens fulvescens (Aurivillius, 1891)
- Charaxes fulvescens monitor Rothschild, 1900
- Charaxes acuminatus cottrelli van Someren, 1963
- Charaxes acuminatus kigezia van Someren, 1963
- Charaxes acuminatus thiryi Bouyer & Vingerhoedt, 2001
- Charaxes protoclea catenaria Rousseau-Decelle, 1934
- Charaxes protoclea nothodes Jordan, 1911
- Charaxes protoclea protonothodes van Someren, 1971
- Charaxes boueti Feisthamel, 1850
- Charaxes macclounii Butler, 1895
- Charaxes alticola Grünberg, 1911
- Charaxes cynthia kinduana Le Cerf, 1923
- Charaxes cynthia sabulosus Talbot, 1928
- Charaxes lucretius intermedius van Someren, 1971
- Charaxes lucretius maximus van Someren, 1971
- Charaxes lactetinctus Karsch, 1892
- Charaxes jasius brunnescens Poulton, 1926
- Charaxes epijasius Reiche, 1850
- Charaxes jasius saturnus Butler, 1866
- Charaxes castor (Cramer, 1775)
- Charaxes brutus angustus Rothschild, 1900
- Charaxes ansorgei ruandana Talbot, 1932
- Charaxes pollux (Cramer, 1775)
- Charaxes druceanus obscura Rebel, 1914
- Charaxes druceanus proximans Joicey & Talbot, 1922
- Charaxes eudoxus mechowi Rothschild, 1900
- Charaxes richelmanni richelmanni Röber, 1936
- Charaxes richelmanni ducarmei Plantrou, 1982
- Charaxes numenes aequatorialis van Someren, 1972
- Charaxes tiridates tiridatinus Röber, 1936
- Charaxes bipunctatus ugandensis van Someren, 1972
- Charaxes mixtus Rothschild, 1894
- Charaxes murphyi Collins, 1989
- Charaxes overlaeti Schouteden, 1934
- Charaxes bohemani Felder & Felder, 1859
- Charaxes smaragdalis smaragdalis Butler, 1866
- Charaxes smaragdalis allardi Bouyer & Vingerhoedt, 1997
- Charaxes smaragdalis caerulea Jackson, 1951
- Charaxes smaragdalis leopoldi Ghesquiére, 1933
- Charaxes xiphares bergeri Plantrou, 1975
- Charaxes xiphares burgessi van Son, 1953
- Charaxes xiphares upembana Plantrou, 1976
- Charaxes imperialis albipuncta Joicey & Talbot, 1920
- Charaxes imperialis pauliani Rousseau-Decelle, 1933
- Charaxes imperialis ugandicus van Someren, 1972
- Charaxes ameliae ameliae Doumet, 1861
- Charaxes ameliae amelina Joicey & Talbot, 1925
- Charaxes pythodoris Hewitson, 1873
- Charaxes hadrianus Ward, 1871
- Charaxes lecerfi Lathy, 192
- Charaxes nobilis nobilis Druce, 1873
- Charaxes nobilis rosaemariae Rousseau-Decelle, 1934
- Charaxes acraeoides Druce, 1908
- Charaxes fournierae Le Moult, 1930
- Charaxes zingha (Stoll, 1780)
- Charaxes etesipe etesipe (Godart, 1824)
- Charaxes etesipe shaba Berger, 1981
- Charaxes penricei penricei Rothschild, 1900
- Charaxes penricei dealbata van Someren, 1966
- Charaxes achaemenes achaemenes Felder & Felder, 1867
- Charaxes achaemenes monticola van Someren, 1970
- Charaxes jahlusa argynnides Westwood, 1864
- Charaxes eupale latimargo Joicey & Talbot, 1921
- Charaxes subornatus subornatus Schultze, 1916
- Charaxes subornatus minor Joicey & Talbot, 1921
- Charaxes dilutus Rothschild, 1898
- Charaxes montis Jackson, 1956
- Charaxes anticlea adusta Rothschild, 1900
- Charaxes anticlea mwera Vingerhoedt & Bouyer, 1996
- Charaxes anticlea proadusta van Someren, 1971
- Charaxes baumanni bwamba van Someren, 1971
- Charaxes baumanni whytei Butler, 1894
- Charaxes opinatus Heron, 1909
- Charaxes thysi Capronnier, 1889
- Charaxes taverniersi Berger, 1975
- Charaxes hildebrandti hildebrandti (Dewitz, 1879)
- Charaxes hildebrandti katangensis Talbot, 1928
- Charaxes virilis van Someren & Jackson, 1952
- Charaxes catachrous van Someren & Jackson, 1952
- Charaxes etheocles carpenteri van Someren & Jackson, 1957
- Charaxes ethalion kitungulensis Strand, 1911
- Charaxes ethalion nyanzae van Someren, 1967
- Charaxes cedreatis Hewitson, 1874
- Charaxes subrubidus van Someren, 1972
- Charaxes howarthi Mining, 1976
- Charaxes fulgurata Aurivillius, 1899
- Charaxes diversiforma van Someren & Jackson, 1957
- Charaxes viola picta van Someren & Jackson, 1952
- Charaxes guderiana (Dewitz, 1879)
- Charaxes kheili Staudinger, 1896
- Charaxes pleione bebra Rothschild, 1900
- Charaxes pleione congoensis Plantrou, 1989
- Charaxes paphianus paphianus Ward, 1871
- Charaxes paphianus subpallida Joicey & Talbot, 1925
- Charaxes kahldeni Homeyer & Dewitz, 1882
- Charaxes zoolina mafugensis Jackson, 1956
- Charaxes nichetes nichetes Grose-Smith, 1883
- Charaxes nichetes leoninus Butler, 1895
- Charaxes nichetes pantherinus Rousseau-Decelle, 1934
- Charaxes lycurgus bernardiana Plantrou, 1978
- Charaxes zelica rougeoti Plantrou, 1978
- Charaxes porthos porthos Grose-Smith, 1883
- Charaxes porthos katangae Rousseau-Decelle, 1931
- Charaxes doubledayi Aurivillius, 1899
- Charaxes mycerina nausicaa Staudinger, 1891
- Charaxes gerdae Rydon, 1989
- Charaxes matakall Darge, 1985
- Charaxes schiltzei Bouyer, 1991
- Charaxes virescens Bouyer, 1991 (endemic)

==== Euxanthini ====
- Charaxes eurinome ansellica (Butler, 1870)
- Charaxes crossleyi crossleyi (Ward, 1871)
- Charaxes crossleyi claudiae (Rousseau-Decelle, 1934)
- Charaxes crossleyi magnifica (Rebel, 1914)
- Charaxes trajanus trajanus (Ward, 1871)
- Charaxes trajanus antonius (Rousseau-Decelle, 1938)
- Charaxes trajanus vansomereni (Poulton, 1929)

==== Pallini ====
- Palla publius centralis van Someren, 1975
- Palla ussheri dobelli (Hall, 1919)
- Palla decius (Cramer, 1777)
- Palla violinitens coniger (Butler, 1896)
- Palla violinitens bwamba van Someren, 1975

=== Apaturinae ===
- Apaturopsis cleochares (Hewitson, 1873)

=== Nymphalinae ===
- Kallimoides rumia jadyae (Fox, 1968)
- Vanessula milca latifasciata Joicey & Talbot, 1928

==== Nymphalini ====
- Antanartia delius (Drury, 1782)
- Antanartia schaeneia dubia Howarth, 1966
- Vanessa dimorphica (Howarth, 1966)
- Vanessa abyssinica vansomereni Howarth, 1966
- Junonia artaxia Hewitson, 1864
- Junonia chorimene (Guérin-Méneville, 1844)
- Junonia natalica angolensis (Rothschild, 1918)
- Junonia schmiedeli (Fiedler, 1920)
- Junonia sophia infracta Butler, 1888
- Junonia stygia (Aurivillius, 1894)
- Junonia gregorii Butler, 1896
- Junonia terea terea (Drury, 1773)
- Junonia terea elgiva Hewitson, 1864
- Junonia terea tereoides (Butler, 1901)
- Junonia touhilimasa Vuillot, 1892
- Junonia westermanni Westwood, 1870
- Junonia ansorgei (Rothschild, 1899)
- Junonia cymodoce lugens (Schultze, 1912)
- Salamis cacta (Fabricius, 1793)
- Protogoniomorpha anacardii ansorgei (Rothschild, 1904)
- Protogoniomorpha anacardii nebulosa (Trimen, 1881)
- Protogoniomorpha parhassus (Drury, 1782)
- Protogoniomorpha temora (Felder & Felder, 1867)
- Precis actia Distant, 1880
- Precis archesia (Cramer, 1779)
- Precis ceryne (Boisduval, 1847)
- Precis coelestina Dewitz, 1879
- Precis cuama (Hewitson, 1864)
- Precis milonia milonia Felder & Felder, 1867
- Precis milonia wintgensi Strand, 1909
- Precis octavia octavia (Cramer, 1777)
- Precis octavia sesamus Trimen, 1883
- Precis pelarga (Fabricius, 1775)
- Precis rauana rauana (Grose-Smith, 1898)
- Precis rauana silvicola Schultz, 1916
- Precis sinuata sinuata Plötz, 1880
- Precis sinuata hecqui Berger, 1981
- Precis tugela pyriformis (Butler, 1896)
- Hypolimnas anthedon anthedon (Doubleday, 1845)
- Hypolimnas anthedon wahlbergi (Wallengren, 1857)
- Hypolimnas bartelotti Grose-Smith, 1890
- Hypolimnas dinarcha (Hewitson, 1865)
- Hypolimnas mechowi (Dewitz, 1884)
- Hypolimnas misippus (Linnaeus, 1764)
- Hypolimnas monteironis (Druce, 1874)
- Hypolimnas salmacis (Drury, 1773)
- Mallika jacksoni (Sharpe, 1896)

=== Cyrestinae ===
==== Cyrestini ====
- Cyrestis camillus (Fabricius, 1781)

=== Biblidinae ===
==== Biblidini ====
- Byblia anvatara crameri Aurivillius, 1894
- Mesoxantha ethosea ethoseoides Rebel, 1914
- Ariadne actisanes (Hewitson, 1875)
- Ariadne albifascia (Joicey & Talbot, 1921)
- Ariadne enotrea archeri Carcasson, 1958
- Ariadne enotrea suffusa (Joicey & Talbot, 1921)
- Ariadne pagenstecheri (Suffert, 1904)
- Ariadne personata (Joicey & Talbot, 1921)
- Neptidopsis ophione nucleata Grünberg, 1911
- Eurytela alinda Mabille, 1893
- Eurytela dryope dryope (Cramer, [1775])
- Eurytela dryope angulata Aurivillius, 1899
- Eurytela hiarbas (Drury, 1782)

==== Epicaliini ====
- Sevenia amulia amulia (Cramer, 1777)
- Sevenia amulia intermedia (Carcasson, 1961)
- Sevenia amulia benguelae (Chapman, 1872)
- Sevenia boisduvali omissa (Rothschild, 1918)
- Sevenia consors (Rothschild & Jordan, 1903)
- Sevenia dubiosa (Strand, 1911)
- Sevenia garega (Karsch, 1892)
- Sevenia morantii (Trimen, 1881)
- Sevenia occidentalium (Mabille, 1876)
- Sevenia pechueli (Dewitz, 1879)
- Sevenia trimeni major (Rothschild, 1918)
- Sevenia umbrina (Karsch, 1892)

=== Limenitinae ===
==== Limenitidini ====
- Harma theobene superna (Fox, 1968)
- Cymothoe altisidora (Hewitson, 1869)
- Cymothoe angulifascia Aurivillius, 1897 (endemic)
- Cymothoe anitorgis (Hewitson, 1874)
- Cymothoe aramis schoutedeni Overlaet, 1952
- Cymothoe arcuata Overlaet, 1945
- Cymothoe beckeri beckeri (Herrich-Schaeffer, 1858)
- Cymothoe beckeri theodosia Staudinger, 1890
- Cymothoe caenis (Drury, 1773)
- Cymothoe capella (Ward, 1871)
- Cymothoe caprina Aurivillius, 1897
- Cymothoe coccinata coccinata (Hewitson, 1874)
- Cymothoe coccinata vrydaghi Overlaet, 1944
- Cymothoe collarti Overlaet, 1942
- Cymothoe colmanti Aurivillius, 1898
- Cymothoe cyclades (Ward, 1871)
- Cymothoe distincta distincta Overlaet, 1944
- Cymothoe distincta kivuensis Overlaet, 1952
- Cymothoe confusa Aurivillius, 1887
- Cymothoe eris eris Aurivillius, 1896
- Cymothoe eris capellides Holland, 1920
- Cymothoe eris sankuruana Overlaet, 1952
- Cymothoe excelsa deltoides Overlaet, 1944
- Cymothoe excelsa regisleopoldi Overlaet, 1944
- Cymothoe fontainei Overlaet, 1952
- Cymothoe fumana balluca Fox & Howarth, 1968
- Cymothoe harmilla micans Bouyer & Joly, 1995
- Cymothoe haynae diphyia Karsch, 1894
- Cymothoe haynae fumosa Staudinger, 1896
- Cymothoe haynae vosiana Overlaet, 1942
- Cymothoe heliada liberatorum Overlaet, 1952
- Cymothoe heliada mutshindji Overlaet, 1940
- Cymothoe herminia katshokwe Overlaet, 1940
- Cymothoe hesiodotus hesiodotus Staudinger, 1890
- Cymothoe hesiodotus clarior Overlaet, 1952
- Cymothoe hobarti candidata Overlaet, 1954
- Cymothoe hobarti mwamikazi Overlaet, 1952
- Cymothoe howarthi Rydon, 1981 (endemic)
- Cymothoe hyarbita hyarbitina Aurivillius, 1897
- Cymothoe hypatha (Hewitson, 1866)
- Cymothoe indamora (Hewitson, 1866)
- Cymothoe isiro Rydon, 1981 (endemic)
- Cymothoe jodutta ciceronis (Ward, 1871)
- Cymothoe jodutta ehmckei Dewitz, 1887
- Cymothoe jodutta mostinckxi Overlaet, 1952
- Cymothoe lucasii lucasii (Doumet, 1859)
- Cymothoe lucasii cloetensi Seeldrayers, 1896
- Cymothoe lurida hesione Weymer, 1907
- Cymothoe lurida centralis Overlaet, 1952
- Cymothoe lurida tristis Overlaet, 1952
- Cymothoe magnus Joicey & Talbot, 1928 (endemic)
- Cymothoe meridionalis meridionalis Overlaet, 1944 (endemic)
- Cymothoe meridionalis ghesquierei Overlaet, 1944 (endemic)
- Cymothoe ochreata Grose-Smith, 1890
- Cymothoe oemilius (Doumet, 1859)
- Cymothoe ogova (Plötz, 1880)
- Cymothoe orphnina orphnina Karsch, 1894
- Cymothoe orphnina suavis Schultze, 1913
- Cymothoe reginaeelisabethae reginaeelisabethae Holland, 1920
- Cymothoe reginaeelisabethae belgarum Overlaet, 1952
- Cymothoe reinholdi vitalis Rebel, 1914
- Cymothoe sangaris sangaris (Godart, 1824)
- Cymothoe sangaris luluana Overlaet, 1945
- Cymothoe sassiana sassiana Schouteden, 1912 (endemic)
- Cymothoe sassiana intermedia Neustetter, 1912 (endemic)
- Cymothoe weymeri Suffert, 1904
- Cymothoe zenkeri Richelmann, 1913
- Kumothales inexpectata Overlaet, 1940
- Pseudoneptis bugandensis ianthe Hemming, 1964
- Pseudacraea acholica mayenceae Hecq, 1987
- Pseudacraea boisduvalii (Doubleday, 1845)
- Pseudacraea clarkii Butler & Rothschild, 1892
- Pseudacraea deludens ducarmei Hecq, 1990
- Pseudacraea dolomena dolomena (Hewitson, 1865)
- Pseudacraea dolomena congoensis Jackson, 1951
- Pseudacraea rubrobasalis Aurivillius, 1903
- Pseudacraea eurytus (Linnaeus, 1758)
- Pseudacraea kuenowii kuenowii Dewitz, 1879
- Pseudacraea kuenowii gottbergi Dewitz, 1884
- Pseudacraea lucretia protracta (Butler, 1874)
- Pseudacraea poggei (Dewitz, 1879)
- Pseudacraea semire (Cramer, 1779)
- Pseudacraea warburgi Aurivillius, 1892

==== Neptidini ====
- Neptis agouale agouale Pierre-Baltus, 1978
- Neptis agouale parallela Collins & Larsen, 1996
- Neptis alta Overlaet, 1955
- Neptis camarensis Schultze, 1920
- Neptis carpenteri d'Abrera, 1980
- Neptis conspicua Neave, 1904
- Neptis constantiae kaumba Condamin, 1966
- Neptis angusta Condamin, 1966
- Neptis continuata Holland, 1892
- Neptis exaleuca exaleuca Karsch, 1894
- Neptis exaleuca suffusa Rothschild, 1918
- Neptis gratiosa Overlaet, 1955
- Neptis jamesoni Godman & Salvin, 1890
- Neptis jordani Neave, 1910
- Neptis kiriakoffi Overlaet, 1955
- Neptis laeta Overlaet, 1955
- Neptis lermanni Aurivillius, 1896
- Neptis liberti Pierre & Pierre-Baltus, 1998
- Neptis lugubris Rebel, 1914
- Neptis marci Collins & Larsen, 1998
- Neptis melicerta (Drury, 1773)
- Neptis metanira Holland, 1892
- Neptis metella (Doubleday, 1848)
- Neptis mixophyes Holland, 1892
- Neptis morosa Overlaet, 1955
- Neptis nebrodes Hewitson, 1874
- Neptis nemetes nemetes Hewitson, 1868
- Neptis nemetes margueriteae Fox, 1968
- Neptis nicobule Holland, 1892
- Neptis nicomedes Hewitson, 1874
- Neptis quintilla Mabille, 1890
- Neptis nicoteles Hewitson, 1874
- Neptis occidentalis Rothschild, 1918
- Neptis ochracea ochracea Neave, 1904
- Neptis ochracea lualabae Berger, 1981
- Neptis ochracea ochreata Gaede, 1915
- Neptis poultoni Eltringham, 1921
- Neptis puella Aurivillius, 1894
- Neptis rothschildi Eltringham, 1921 (endemic)
- Neptis seeldrayersi Aurivillius, 1895
- Neptis serena Overlaet, 1955
- Neptis strigata strigata Aurivillius, 1894
- Neptis strigata kakamega Collins & Larsen, 1996
- Neptis trigonophora melicertula Strand, 1912
- Neptis troundi Pierre-Baltus, 1978
- Neptis vingerhoedti Pierre-Baltus, 2003 (endemic)

==== Adoliadini ====
- Catuna angustatum (Felder & Felder, 1867)
- Catuna crithea (Drury, 1773)
- Catuna niji Fox, 1965
- Catuna oberthueri Karsch, 1894
- Euryphura achlys (Hopffer, 1855)
- Euryphura athymoides Berger, 1981
- Euryphura chalcis (Felder & Felder, 1860)
- Euryphura isuka Stoneham, 1935
- Euryphura ducarmei Hecq, 1990
- Euryphura plautilla (Hewitson, 1865)
- Euryphura porphyrion congoensis Joicey & Talbot, 1921
- Euryphura porphyrion fontainei Hecq, 1990
- Euryphura concordia (Hopffer, 1855)
- Euryphurana nobilis viridis (Hancock, 1990)
- Harmilla elegans elegans Aurivillius, 1892
- Harmilla elegans hawkeri Joicey & Talbot, 1926
- Pseudargynnis hegemone (Godart, 1819)
- Aterica galene extensa Heron, 1909
- Cynandra opis bernardii Lagnel, 1967
- Euriphene hecqui Collins & Larsen, 1997
- Euriphene abasa (Hewitson, 1866)
- Euriphene adumbrata (Joicey & Talbot, 1928) (endemic)
- Euriphene alberici (Dufrane, 1945) (endemic)
- Euriphene amaranta (Karsch, 1894)
- Euriphene amicia (Hewitson, 1871)
- Euriphene atossa atossa (Hewitson, 1865)
- Euriphene atossa australis d'Abrera, 1980
- Euriphene atrovirens (Mabille, 1878)
- Euriphene barombina (Aurivillius, 1894)
- Euriphene butleri butleri (Aurivillius, 1904)
- Euriphene butleri kivuensis (Jackson & Howarth, 1957)
- Euriphene camarensis (Ward, 1871)
- Euriphene conjungens chalybeata (Talbot, 1937)
- Euriphene core Hecq, 1994 (endemic)
- Euriphene ernestibaumanni integribasis (Hulstaert, 1924)
- Euriphene excelsior (Rebel, 1911)
- Euriphene fouassini Hecq, 1994 (endemic)
- Euriphene gambiae gabonica Bernardi, 1966
- Euriphene glaucopis (Gaede, 1916)
- Euriphene goniogramma (Karsch, 1894)
- Euriphene grosesmithi (Staudinger, 1891)
- Euriphene incerta incerta (Aurivillius, 1912)
- Euriphene incerta theodota (Hulstaert, 1924)
- Euriphene intermixta (Aurivillius, 1904) (endemic)
- Euriphene iris (Aurivillius, 1903)
- Euriphene ituriensis (Jackson & Howarth, 1957) (endemic)
- Euriphene jacksoni (Talbot, 1937)
- Euriphene jolyana Hecq, 1987 (endemic)
- Euriphene kahli (Holland, 1920) (endemic)
- Euriphene karschi (Aurivillius, 1894)
- Euriphene luteostriata (Bethune-Baker, 1908)
- Euriphene mawamba Bethune-Baker, 1908 (endemic)
- Euriphene milnei (Hewitson, 1865)
- Euriphene monforti Hecq, 1994 (endemic)
- Euriphene niepelti Neustetter, 1916
- Euriphene obsoleta (Grünberg, 1908)
- Euriphene pallidior (Hulstaert, 1924)
- Euriphene plagiata (Aurivillius, 1897)
- Euriphene rectangula (Schultze, 1920)
- Euriphene regula Hecq, 1994
- Euriphene ribensis (Ward, 1871)
- Euriphene romi (Aurivillius, 1898) (endemic)
- Euriphene rotundata (Holland, 1920) (endemic)
- Euriphene saphirina saphirina (Karsch, 1894)
- Euriphene saphirina trioculata (Talbot, 1927)
- Euriphene tadema tadema (Hewitson, 1866)
- Euriphene tadema nigropunctata (Aurivillius, 1901)
- Euriphene doriclea (Drury, 1782)
- Euriphene lysandra (Stoll, 1790)
- Euriphene melanops (Aurivillius, 1897)
- Bebearia languida (Schultze, 1920)
- Bebearia tentyris seeldrayersi (Aurivillius, 1899)
- Bebearia carshena (Hewitson, 1871)
- Bebearia absolon (Fabricius, 1793)
- Bebearia micans (Aurivillius, 1899)
- Bebearia zonara (Butler, 1871)
- Bebearia mandinga mandinga (Felder & Felder, 1860)
- Bebearia mandinga beni Hecq, 1990
- Bebearia oxione squalida (Talbot, 1928)
- Bebearia abesa abesa (Hewitson, 1869)
- Bebearia abesa pandera Hecq, 1988
- Bebearia partita (Aurivillius, 1895)
- Bebearia barce maculata (Aurivillius, 1912)
- Bebearia comus comus (Ward, 1871)
- Bebearia comus retracta Hecq, 1989
- Bebearia cocalioides Hecq, 1988
- Bebearia guineensis (Felder & Felder, 1867)
- Bebearia cocalia badiana (Rbel, 1914)
- Bebearia cocalia katera (van Someren, 1939)
- Bebearia sophus sophus (Fabricius, 1793)
- Bebearia sophus aruunda (Overlaet, 1955)
- Bebearia staudingeri (Aurivillius, 1893)
- Bebearia plistonax (Hewitson, 1874)
- Bebearia elpinice (Hewitson, 1869)
- Bebearia brunhilda brunhilda (Kirby, 1889)
- Bebearia brunhilda iturina (Karsch, 1894)
- Bebearia brunhilda sankuruensis Hecq, 1989
- Bebearia congolensis (Capronnier, 1889)
- Bebearia laetitioides (Joicey & Talbot, 1921)
- Bebearia severini (Aurivillius, 1897)
- Bebearia phranza fuscara Hecq, 1989
- Bebearia phranza moreelsi d'Abrera, 1980
- Bebearia phranza robiginosus (Talbot, 1927)
- Bebearia laetitia laetitia (Plötz, 1880)
- Bebearia laetitia vesta Hecq, 1989
- Bebearia flaminia (Staudinger, 1891)
- Bebearia maximiana (Staudinger, 1891)
- Bebearia nivaria tenuimacula Berger, 1981
- Bebearia phantasia concolor Hecq, 1988
- Bebearia leptotypa (Bethune-Baker, 1908) (endemic)
- Bebearia equatorialis Hecq, 1989 (endemic)
- Bebearia tessmanni kwiluensis Hecq, 1989
- Bebearia cutteri cuypersi Hecq, 2002
- Bebearia eliensis eliensis (Hewitson, 1866)
- Bebearia eliensis unita (Capronnier, 1889)
- Bebearia barombina (Staudinger, 1896)
- Bebearia octogramma (Grose-Smith & Kirby, 1889)
- Bebearia allardi Hecq, 1989 (endemic)
- Bebearia aurora aurora (Aurivillius, 1896)
- Bebearia aurora graueri Hecq, 1990
- Bebearia aurora theia Hecq, 1989
- Bebearia aurora wilverthi (Aurivillius, 1898)
- Bebearia braytoni (Sharpe, 1907)
- Bebearia chilonis (Hewitson, 1874)
- Bebearia chloeropis (Bethune-Baker, 1908)
- Bebearia cinaethon cinaethon (Hewitson, 1874)
- Bebearia cinaethon ikelemboides Hecq, 1989
- Bebearia cottoni (Bethune-Baker, 1908) (endemic)
- Bebearia defluera Hecq, 1998
- Bebearia discors Hecq, 1994
- Bebearia ducalis (Grünberg, 1911) (endemic)
- Bebearia ducarmei Hecq, 1987
- Bebearia fontaineana Hecq, 1987
- Bebearia fontainei Berger, 1981 (endemic)
- Bebearia fulgurata (Aurivillius, 1904) (endemic)
- Bebearia hargreavesi d'Abrera, 1980 (endemic)
- Bebearia ikelemba (Aurivillius, 1901) (endemic)
- Bebearia hassoni kamituga Berger, 1981
- Bebearia luteola (Bethune-Baker, 1908) (endemic)
- Bebearia makala (Bethune-Baker, 1908)
- Bebearia picturata Hecq, 1989 (endemic)
- Bebearia romboutsi Hecq, 2001 (endemic)
- Bebearia schoutedeni (Overlaet, 1954)
- Euphaedra rubrocostata rubrocostata (Aurivillius, 1897)
- Euphaedra rubrocostata generosa Hecq, 1987
- Euphaedra symphona symphona Bethune-Baker, 1908 (endemic)
- Euphaedra symphona affabilis Hecq, 1996 (endemic)
- Euphaedra aurivillii Niepelt, 1914 (endemic)
- Euphaedra adolfifriderici Schultze, 1920
- Euphaedra luteofasciata Hecq, 1979
- Euphaedra marginalis Hecq, 1979 (endemic)
- Euphaedra lupercoides Rothschild, 1918
- Euphaedra imperialis arta Hecq, 1979
- Euphaedra medon innotata Holland, 1920
- Euphaedra medon celestis Hecq, 1986
- Euphaedra medon neustetteri Niepelt, 1915
- Euphaedra clio Hecq, 1981
- Euphaedra ducarmei Hecq, 1977 (endemic)
- Euphaedra landbecki Rothschild, 1918 (endemic)
- Euphaedra thalie Hecq, 1981 (endemic)
- Euphaedra erici Hecq & Joly, 1987 (endemic)
- Euphaedra zaddachii zaddachii Dewitz, 1879
- Euphaedra zaddachii crawshayi Butler, 1895
- Euphaedra zaddachii elephantina Staudinger, 1891
- Euphaedra mbamou Hecq, 1987
- Euphaedra morini Hecq, 1983 (endemic)
- Euphaedra barnsi Joicey & Talbot, 1922
- Euphaedra jacqueshecqui Bollino, 1998 (endemic)
- Euphaedra hewitsoni bipuncta Hecq, 1974
- Euphaedra hewitsoni angusta Hecq, 1974
- Euphaedra acuta Hecq, 1977
- Euphaedra oremansi Hecq, 1996 (endemic)
- Euphaedra maxima Holland, 1920
- Euphaedra brevis Hecq, 1977
- Euphaedra herberti herberti (Sharpe, 1891)
- Euphaedra herberti katanga Hecq, 1980
- Euphaedra graueri Rothschild, 1918 (endemic)
- Euphaedra ubangi Hecq, 1974 (endemic)
- Euphaedra acutoides Hecq, 1996 (endemic)
- Euphaedra karschi karschi Bartel, 1905
- Euphaedra karschi sankuruensis Hecq, 1980
- Euphaedra lata Hecq, 1980
- Euphaedra grandis Hecq, 1980 (endemic)
- Euphaedra sinuosa sinuosa Hecq, 1974 (endemic)
- Euphaedra sinuosa plagiaria Hecq, 1980 (endemic)
- Euphaedra sinuosa smitsi Hecq, 1991 (endemic)
- Euphaedra hollandi Hecq, 1974
- Euphaedra diffusa Gaede, 1916
- Euphaedra mirabilis mirabilis Hecq, 1980
- Euphaedra mirabilis lurida Hecq, 1997
- Euphaedra mirabilis nubila Hecq, 1986
- Euphaedra ansorgei Rothschild, 1918
- Euphaedra caerulescens Grose-Smith, 1890
- Euphaedra cuprea cuprea Hecq, 1980 (endemic)
- Euphaedra cuprea irangi Oremans, 2000 (endemic)
- Euphaedra cuprea smaragdula Hecq, 2004 (endemic)
- Euphaedra irangi Hecq, 2004 (endemic)
- Euphaedra romboutsi Hecq, 2004 (endemic)
- Euphaedra imitans Holland, 1893
- Euphaedra cyparissa aurata Carpenter, 1895
- Euphaedra sarcoptera cyparissoides Hecq, 1979
- Euphaedra sarcoptera nipponicorum (Carcasson, 1965)
- Euphaedra thierrybaulini Oremans, 1999 (endemic)
- Euphaedra permixtum (Butler, 1873)
- Euphaedra eberti eberti Aurivillius, 1896
- Euphaedra eberti hamus Berger, 1940
- Euphaedra janetta campaspoides Hecq, 1985
- Euphaedra janetta remota Hecq, 1991
- Euphaedra campaspe permixtoides Hecq, 1986
- Euphaedra centralis Hecq, 1985 (endemic)
- Euphaedra congo Hecq, 1985
- Euphaedra justicia Staudinger, 1886
- Euphaedra apparata Hecq, 1982 (endemic)
- Euphaedra adonina spectacularis Hecq, 1997
- Euphaedra piriformis Hecq, 1982
- Euphaedra uniformis Berger, 1981
- Euphaedra ueleana Hecq, 1982 (endemic)
- Euphaedra sarita sarita (Sharpe, 1891)
- Euphaedra sarita lulua Hecq, 1977
- Euphaedra grilloti Hecq, 1983
- Euphaedra fontainei Hecq, 1977
- Euphaedra intermedia Rebel, 1914 (endemic)
- Euphaedra phosphor Joicey & Talbot, 1921
- Euphaedra viridicaerulea inanoides Holland, 1920
- Euphaedra viridicaerulea griseargentina Hecq, 1977
- Euphaedra ravola (Hewitson, 1866)
- Euphaedra preussiana preussiana Gaede, 1916
- Euphaedra preussiana robusta Hecq, 1983
- Euphaedra solida Hecq, 1997 (endemic)
- Euphaedra cottoni Sharpe, 1907
- Euphaedra jolyana Hecq, 1986 (endemic)
- Euphaedra regisleopoldi Hecq, 1996 (endemic)
- Euphaedra regularis Hecq, 1983 (endemic)
- Euphaedra dargeana Hecq, 1980
- Euphaedra subprotea Hecq, 1986
- Euphaedra preussi preussi Staudinger, 1891
- Euphaedra preussi pallida Hecq, 1984
- Euphaedra alboides Hecq, 1984 (endemic)
- Euphaedra vicina vicina Hecq, 1984
- Euphaedra vicina pallidoides Hecq, 1984
- Euphaedra procera Hecq, 1984
- Euphaedra subprocera Hecq, 1984 (endemic)
- Euphaedra albofasciata Berger, 1981
- Euphaedra disjuncta disjuncta Hecq, 1984
- Euphaedra disjuncta virens Hecq, 1984
- Euphaedra mayumbensis Hecq, 1984
- Euphaedra subviridis Holland, 1920 (endemic)
- Euphaedra fulvofasciata Hecq, 1984
- Euphaedra leloupi Overlaet, 1955 (endemic)
- Euphaedra margueriteae Hecq, 1978
- Euphaedra overlaeti Hulstaert, 1926
- Euphaedra fascinata Hecq, 1984
- Euphaedra xerophila Hecq, 1974 (endemic)
- Euphaedra ochrovirens Hecq, 1984
- Euphaedra miranda Hecq, 1984
- Euphaedra niveovittata Overlaet, 1955 (endemic)
- Euphaedra illustris Talbot, 1927 (endemic)
- Euphaedra bergeri Hecq, 1974 (endemic)
- Euphaedra cinnamomea Rothschild, 1918 (endemic)
- Euphaedra eleus eleus (Drury, 1782)
- Euphaedra eleus gigas Hecq, 1996
- Euphaedra simplex Hecq, 1978
- Euphaedra alacris Hecq, 1978
- Euphaedra alternus van Someren, 1935 (endemic)
- Euphaedra rattrayi Sharpe, 1904
- Euphaedra subferruginea Guillaumin, 1976
- Euphaedra coprates (Druce, 1875)
- Euphaedra ochracea Hecq, 1980 (endemic)
- Euphaedra variabilis Guillaumin, 1976
- Euphaedra cooksoni Druce, 1905
- Euphaedra katangensis Talbot, 1927
- Euphaedra nigrobasalis nigrobasalis Joicey & Talbot, 1921
- Euphaedra nigrobasalis upemba Overlaet, 1955
- Euphaedra castanoides Hecq, 1985
- Euphaedra edwardsii (van der Hoeven, 1845)
- Euphaedra ruspina (Hewitson, 1865)
- Euphaedra harpalyce spatiosa (Mabille, 1876)
- Euphaedra harpalyce serena Talbot, 1928
- Euphaedra luafa Oremans, 1998 (endemic)
- Euphaedra losinga losinga (Hewitson, 1864)
- Euphaedra losinga wardi (Druce, 1874)
- Euphaedra losinga limita Hecq, 1978
- Euphaedra cuypersiana Hecq, 2006 (endemic)
- Euphaedra castanea Berger, 1981 (endemic)
- Euphaedra sardetta Berger, 1981
- Euphaedra wissmanni Niepelt, 1906 (endemic)
- Euptera amieti Collins & Libert, 1998
- Euptera choveti Amiet & Collins, 1998
- Euptera crowleyi centralis Libert, 1995
- Euptera debruynei (Hecq, 1990) (endemic)
- Euptera ducarmei Collins, 1998
- Euptera elabontas mweruensis Neave, 1910
- Euptera falsathyma Schultze, 1916
- Euptera freyja ornata Libert, 1998
- Euptera ginettae Libert, 2005 (endemic)
- Euptera hirundo hirundo Staudinger, 1891
- Euptera hirundo lufirensis Joicey & Talbot, 1921
- Euptera ituriensis Libert, 1998 (endemic)
- Euptera liberti Collins, 1987
- Euptera mirabilis Libert, 2005 (endemic)
- Euptera mirifica Carpenter & Jackson, 1950
- Euptera neptunus Joicey & Talbot, 1924
- Euptera pluto pluto (Ward, 1873)
- Euptera pluto primitiva Hancock, 1984
- Euptera schultzei Libert & Chovet, 1998
- Euptera semirufa Joicey & Talbot, 1921
- Pseudathyma callina (Grose-Smith, 1898)
- Pseudathyma cyrili Chovet, 2002
- Pseudathyma endjami Libert, 2002
- Pseudathyma jacksoni kivuensis Libert, 2002
- Pseudathyma michelae Libert, 2002
- Pseudathyma neptidina Karsch, 1894
- Pseudathyma plutonica plutonica Butler, 1902
- Pseudathyma plutonica shaba Chovet, 2002

=== Heliconiinae ===
==== Acraeini ====
- Acraea cerasa cerita Sharpe, 1906
- Acraea kraka pallida Carpenter, 1932
- Acraea acara Hewitson, 1865
- Acraea admatha Hewitson, 1865
- Acraea anemosa Hewitson, 1865
- Acraea eltringhami Joicey & Talbot, 1921
- Acraea endoscota Le Doux, 1928
- Acraea eugenia Karsch, 1893
- Acraea hamata Joicey & Talbot, 1922
- Acraea insignis Distant, 1880
- Acraea kinduana Pierre, 1979 (endemic)
- Acraea leucographa Ribbe, 1889
- Acraea neobule Doubleday, 1847
- Acraea pseudolycia Butler, 1874
- Acraea quirina (Fabricius, 1781)
- Acraea zetes (Linnaeus, 1758)
- Acraea acrita Hewitson, 1865
- Acraea annonae Pierre, 1987 (endemic)
- Acraea atolmis Westwood, 1881
- Acraea bailundensis Wichgraf, 1918
- Acraea cepheus (Linnaeus, 1758)
- Acraea chaeribula Oberthür, 1893
- Acraea diogenes Suffert, 1904
- Acraea egina (Cramer, 1775)
- Acraea eltringhamiana Le Doux, 1932
- Acraea guillemei Oberthür, 1893
- Acraea loranae Pierre, 1987 (endemic)
- Acraea lualabae Neave, 1910 (endemic)
- Acraea mansya Eltringham, 1911
- Acraea omrora umbraetae Pierre, 1988
- Acraea overlaeti Pierre, 1988 (endemic)
- Acraea periphanes Oberthür, 1893
- Acraea asboloplintha Karsch, 1894
- Acraea atergatis Westwood, 1881
- Acraea buettneri Rogenhofer, 1890
- Acraea caecilia (Fabricius, 1781)
- Acraea caldarena Hewitson, 1877
- Acraea intermediodes Ackery, 1995
- Acraea leucopyga Aurivillius, 1904
- Acraea natalica Boisduval, 1847
- Acraea oncaea Hopffer, 1855
- Acraea pseudegina Westwood, 1852
- Acraea rhodesiana Wichgraf, 1909
- Acraea rogersi Hewitson, 1873
- Acraea sykesi Sharpe, 1902
- Acraea adrasta pancalis (Jordan, 1910)
- Acraea aganice nicega (Suffert, 1904)
- Acraea alcinoe camerunica (Aurivillius, 1893)
- Acraea consanguinea intermedia (Aurivillius, 1899)
- Acraea elongata (Butler, 1874)
- Acraea epaea epaea (Cramer, 1779)
- Acraea epaea bicolorata (Le Doux, 1937)
- Acraea epaea kivuana (Jordan, 1910)
- Acraea epaea lutosa (Suffert, 1904)
- Acraea epiprotea (Butler, 1874)
- Acraea excisa (Butler, 1874)
- Acraea formosa (Butler, 1874)
- Acraea leopoldina leopoldina (Aurivillius, 1895)
- Acraea leopoldina brevimacula (Talbot, 1928)
- Acraea leopoldina macrosticha (Bethune-Baker, 1908)
- Acraea macarista (Sharpe, 1906)
- Acraea obliqua kivuensis (Joicey & Talbot, 1927)
- Acraea persanguinea (Rebel, 1914)
- Acraea poggei poggei Dewitz, 1879
- Acraea poggei nelsoni Grose-Smith & Kirby, 1892
- Acraea pseuderyta Godman & Salvin, 1890
- Acraea quadricolor latifasciata (Sharpe, 1892)
- Acraea tellus tellus (Aurivillius, 1893)
- Acraea tellus schubotzi (Grünberg, 1911)
- Acraea umbra hemileuca (Jordan, 1914)
- Acraea umbra macarioides (Aurivillius, 1893)
- Acraea vestalis congoensis (Le Doux, 1937)
- Acraea vestalis stavelia (Suffert, 1904)
- Acraea acerata Hewitson, 1874
- Acraea alciope Hewitson, 1852
- Acraea alciopoides Joicey & Talbot, 1921
- Acraea alicia (Sharpe, 1890)
- Acraea althoffi althoffi Dewitz, 1889
- Acraea althoffi rubrofasciata Aurivillius, 1895
- Acraea amicitiae Heron, 1909
- Acraea ansorgei Grose-Smith, 1898
- Acraea aurivillii Staudinger, 1896
- Acraea bonasia (Fabricius, 1775)
- Acraea buschbecki Dewitz, 1889
- Acraea burgessi Jackson, 1956
- Acraea cabira Hopffer, 1855
- Acraea circeis (Drury, 1782)
- Acraea disjuncta kigeziensis Jackson, 1956
- Acraea encedana Pierre, 1976
- Acraea encoda Pierre, 1981
- Acraea serena (Fabricius, 1775)
- Acraea esebria Hewitson, 1861
- Acraea goetzei Thurau, 1903
- Acraea grosvenori Eltringham, 1912
- Acraea hecqui Berger, 1981 (endemic)
- Acraea iturina Grose-Smith, 1890
- Acraea jodutta (Fabricius, 1793)
- Acraea toruna Grose-Smith, 1900
- Acraea kalinzu Carpenter, 1936
- Acraea lumiri Bethune-Baker, 1908
- Acraea lycoa Godart, 1819
- Acraea oberthueri Butler, 1895
- Acraea orestia Hewitson, 1874
- Acraea pelopeia Staudinger, 1896
- Acraea peneleos pelasgius Grose-Smith, 1900
- Acraea pentapolis Ward, 1871
- Acraea pharsalus Ward, 1871
- Acraea pierrei Berger, 1981 (endemic)
- Acraea rangatana bettiana Joicey & Talbot, 1921
- Acraea rileyi Le Doux, 1931 (endemic)
- Acraea sotikensis Sharpe, 1892
- Acraea uvui Grose-Smith, 1890
- Acraea ventura ventura Hewitson, 1877
- Acraea ventura ochrascens Sharpe, 1902
- Acraea vesperalis Grose-Smith, 1890
- Acraea viviana Staudinger, 1896
- Acraea anacreontica Grose-Smith, 1898
- Acraea lusinga Overlaet, 1955
- Acraea mirifica Lathy, 1906
- Acraea rahira Boisduval, 1833
- Acraea wigginsi Neave, 1904
- Acraea cinerea cinerea Neave, 1904
- Acraea cinerea luluae Berger, 1981
- Acraea ntebiae ntebiae Sharpe, 1897
- Acraea ntebiae dewitzi Carcasson, 1981
- Acraea oreas oreas Sharpe, 1891
- Acraea oreas angolanus Lathy, 1906
- Acraea orinata Oberthür, 1893
- Acraea parrhasia servona Godart, 1819
- Acraea penelope Staudinger, 1896
- Acraea perenna Doubleday, 1847
- Acraea quirinalis Grose-Smith, 1900
- Acraea semivitrea Aurivillius, 1895
- Acraea kuekenthali Le Doux, 1922

==== Argynnini ====
- Issoria baumanni excelsior (Butler, 1896)
- Issoria baumanni katangae (Neave, 1910)

==== Vagrantini ====
- Lachnoptera anticlia (Hübner, 1819)
- Phalanta eurytis (Doubleday, 1847)
- Phalanta phalantha aethiopica (Rothschild & Jordan, 1903)

== Hesperiidae ==
=== Coeliadinae ===
- Coeliades bixana Evans, 1940
- Coeliades forestan (Stoll, [1782])
- Coeliades hanno (Plötz, 1879)
- Coeliades libeon (Druce, 1875)
- Coeliades pisistratus (Fabricius, 1793)
- Pyrrhochalcia iphis dejongi Collins & Larsen, 2008

=== Pyrginae ===
==== Celaenorrhinini ====
- Loxolexis hollandi (Druce, 1909)
- Loxolexis holocausta (Mabille, 1891)
- Celaenorrhinus beni jacquelinae Miller, 1971
- Celaenorrhinus bettoni Butler, 1902
- Celaenorrhinus boadicea boadicea (Hewitson, 1877)
- Celaenorrhinus boadicea howarthi Berger, 1976
- Celaenorrhinus chrysoglossa (Mabille, 1891)
- Celaenorrhinus hecqui Berger, 1976 (endemic)
- Celaenorrhinus homeyeri (Plötz, 1880)
- Celaenorrhinus illustris (Mabille, 1891)
- Celaenorrhinus intermixtus intermixtus Aurivillius, 1896
- Celaenorrhinus intermixtus evansi Berger, 1975
- Celaenorrhinus kasai kasai Evans, 1956 (endemic)
- Celaenorrhinus kasai kapangana Berger, 1976 (endemic)
- Celaenorrhinus kivuensis Joicey & Talbot, 1921
- Celaenorrhinus macrostictus Holland, 1893
- Celaenorrhinus meditrina (Hewitson, 1877)
- Celaenorrhinus nigropunctata Bethune-Baker, 1908
- Celaenorrhinus ovalis Evans, 1937
- Celaenorrhinus perlustris perlustris Rebel, 1914
- Celaenorrhinus perlustris katangensis Berger, 1976
- Celaenorrhinus plagiatus Berger, 1976
- Celaenorrhinus pooanus Aurivillius, 1910
- Celaenorrhinus rutilans (Mabille, 1877)
- Celaenorrhinus selysi Berger, 1955 (endemic)
- Celaenorrhinus suzannae Berger, 1976 (endemic)
- Eretis buamba Evans, 1937
- Eretis camerona Evans, 1937
- Eretis herewardi Riley, 1921
- Eretis lugens (Rogenhofer, 1891)
- Eretis melania Mabille, 1891
- Eretis vaga Evans, 1937
- Sarangesa astrigera Butler, 1894
- Sarangesa brigida sanaga Miller, 1964
- Sarangesa haplopa Swinhoe, 1907
- Sarangesa lucidella (Mabille, 1891)
- Sarangesa lunula Druce, 1910 (endemic)
- Sarangesa maculata (Mabille, 1891)
- Sarangesa maxima Neave, 1910
- Sarangesa pandaensis Joicey & Talbot, 1921
- Sarangesa seineri Strand, 1909
- Sarangesa tertullianus (Fabricius, 1793)
- Sarangesa thecla thecla (Plötz, 1879)
- Sarangesa thecla mabira Evans, 1956
- Sarangesa tricerata (Mabille, 1891)

==== Tagiadini ====
- Eagris decastigma purpura Evans, 1937
- Eagris lucetia (Hewitson, 1875)
- Eagris tetrastigma (Mabille, 1891)
- Eagris tigris Evans, 1937
- Calleagris hollandi (Butler, 1897)
- Calleagris jamesoni (Sharpe, 1890)
- Calleagris lacteus (Mabille, 1877)
- Calleagris landbecki (Druce, 1910)
- Procampta rara Holland, 1892
- Caprona adelica Karsch, 1892
- Netrobalane canopus (Trimen, 1864)
- Abantis bamptoni Collins & Larsen, 1994
- Abantis bismarcki Karsch, 1892
- Abantis contigua Evans, 1937
- Abantis efulensis Holland, 1896
- Abantis leucogaster leucogaster (Mabille, 1890)
- Abantis leucogaster iruma Evans, 1951
- Abantis lucretia lofu Neave, 1910
- Abantis paradisea (Butler, 1870)
- Abantis rubra Holland, 1920
- Abantis tettensis Hopffer, 1855
- Abantis venosa Trimen & Bowker, 1889
- Abantis vidua Weymer, 1901
- Abantis zambesiaca (Westwood, 1874)

==== Carcharodini ====
- Spialia depauperata (Strand, 1911)
- Spialia dromus (Plötz, 1884)
- Spialia mafa (Trimen, 1870)
- Spialia ploetzi (Aurivillius, 1891)
- Spialia secessus (Trimen, 1891)

=== Hesperiinae ===
==== Aeromachini ====
- Astictopterus abjecta (Snellen, 1872)
- Astictopterus punctulata (Butler, 1895)
- Ampittia capenas blanda Evans, 1947
- Kedestes brunneostriga (Plötz, 1884)
- Kedestes lema Neave, 1910
- Kedestes mohozutza (Wallengren, 1857)
- Kedestes protensa Butler, 1901
- Kedestes straeleni Evans, 1956
- Gorgyra aretina (Hewitson, 1878)
- Gorgyra bibulus Riley, 1929
- Gorgyra bina Evans, 1937
- Gorgyra diversata Evans, 1937
- Gorgyra johnstoni (Butler, 1894)
- Gorgyra kalinzu Evans, 1949
- Gorgyra minima Holland, 1896
- Gorgyra mocquerysii Holland, 1896
- Gorgyra pali Evans, 1937
- Gorgyra rubescens Holland, 1896
- Gorgyra sara Evans, 1937
- Gorgyra sola Evans, 1937
- Gyrogra subnotata (Holland, 1894)
- Teniorhinus harona (Westwood, 1881)
- Teniorhinus ignita (Mabille, 1877)
- Teniorhinus niger (Druce, 1910)
- Ceratrichia argyrosticta enta Evans, 1947
- Ceratrichia aurea Druce, 1910
- Ceratrichia brunnea Bethune-Baker, 1906
- Ceratrichia clara medea Evans, 1937
- Ceratrichia flandria Evans, 1956 (endemic)
- Ceratrichia hollandi Bethune-Baker, 1908
- Ceratrichia mabirensis Riley, 1925
- Ceratrichia semilutea Mabille, 1891
- Ceratrichia semlikensis Joicey & Talbot, 1921
- Ceratrichia wollastoni Heron, 1909
- Pardaleodes bule Holland, 1896
- Pardaleodes edipus (Stoll, 1781)
- Pardaleodes fan (Holland, 1894)
- Pardaleodes incerta (Snellen, 1872)
- Pardaleodes sator pusiella Mabille, 1877
- Pardaleodes tibullus (Fabricius, 1793)
- Xanthodisca astrape (Holland, 1892)
- Xanthodisca vibius (Hewitson, 1878)
- Acada annulifer (Holland, 1892)
- Acada biseriata (Mabille, 1893)
- Rhabdomantis galatia (Hewitson, 1868)
- Rhabdomantis sosia (Mabille, 1891)
- Osmodes adon (Mabille, 1890)
- Osmodes adonia Evans, 1937
- Osmodes adosus (Mabille, 1890)
- Osmodes costatus Aurivillius, 1896
- Osmodes distincta Holland, 1896
- Osmodes hollandi Evans, 1937
- Osmodes laronia (Hewitson, 1868)
- Osmodes lux Holland, 1892
- Osmodes omar Swinhoe, 1916
- Osmodes thora (Plötz, 1884)
- Parosmodes lentiginosa (Holland, 1896)
- Parosmodes morantii (Trimen, 1873)
- Paracleros biguttulus (Mabille, 1890)
- Paracleros substrigata (Holland, 1893)
- Osphantes ogowena ogowena (Mabille, 1891)
- Osphantes ogowena lulua Evans, 1956
- Acleros bibundica Strand, 1913
- Acleros mackenii olaus (Plötz, 1884)
- Acleros mackenii instabilis Mabille, 1890
- Acleros neavei Evans, 1937
- Acleros nigrapex Strand, 1913
- Acleros ploetzi Mabille, 1890
- Acleros sparsum Druce, 1909
- Semalea arela (Mabille, 1891)
- Semalea atrio (Mabille, 1891)
- Semalea pulvina (Plötz, 1879)
- Semalea sextilis (Plötz, 1886)
- Hypoleucis ophiusa ophiusa (Hewitson, 1866)
- Hypoleucis ophiusa ophir Evans, 1937
- Hypoleucis sophia Evans, 1937
- Hypoleucis tripunctata draga Evans, 1937
- Meza banda (Evans, 1937)
- Meza cybeutes (Holland, 1894)
- Meza indusiata (Mabille, 1891)
- Meza larea (Neave, 1910)
- Meza mabea (Holland, 1894)
- Meza meza (Hewitson, 1877)
- Paronymus budonga (Evans, 1938)
- Paronymus nevea (Druce, 1910)
- Paronymus xanthias (Mabille, 1891)
- Andronymus caesar caesar (Fabricius, 1793)
- Andronymus caesar philander (Hopffer, 1855)
- Andronymus evander (Mabille, 1890)
- Andronymus fenestrella Bethune-Baker, 1908
- Andronymus fontainei T.B. Larsen & Congdon, 2012
- Andronymus gander Evans, 1947
- Andronymus helles Evans, 1937
- Andronymus hero Evans, 1937
- Andronymus marcus Usher, 1980
- Andronymus neander (Plötz, 1884)
- Chondrolepis cynthia Evans, 1936
- Chondrolepis ducarmei T.B. Larsen & Congdon, 2012
- Chondrolepis leggei (Heron, 1909)
- Chondrolepis niveicornis (Plötz, 1883)
- Zophopetes cerymica (Hewitson, 1867)
- Zophopetes nobilior (Holland, 1896)
- Gamia buchholzi (Plötz, 1879)
- Artitropa comus (Stoll, 1782)
- Artitropa milleri Riley, 1925
- Artitropa reducta Aurivillius, 1925
- Mopala orma (Plötz, 1879)
- Gretna balenge (Holland, 1891)
- Gretna carmen Evans, 1937
- Gretna cylinda (Hewitson, 1876)
- Gretna lacida (Hewitson, 1876)
- Gretna waga (Plötz, 1886)
- Pteroteinon caenira (Hewitson, 1867)
- Pteroteinon capronnieri (Plötz, 1879)
- Pteroteinon ceucaenira (Druce, 1910)
- Pteroteinon concaenira Belcastro & Larsen, 1996
- Pteroteinon iricolor (Holland, 1890)
- Pteroteinon laterculus (Holland, 1890)
- Pteroteinon laufella (Hewitson, 1868)
- Pteroteinon pruna Evans, 1937
- Leona binoevatus (Mabille, 1891)
- Leona maracanda (Hewitson, 1876)
- Leona lota Evans, 1937
- Leona leonora leonora (Plötz, 1879)
- Leona leonora dux Evans, 1937
- Leona stoehri (Karsch, 1893)
- Leona meloui (Riley, 1926)
- Leona halma Evans, 1937
- Leona luehderi luehderi (Plötz, 1879)
- Leona luehderi laura Evans, 1937
- Leona allyni (Miller, 1971) (endemic)
- Caenides kangvensis Holland, 1896
- Caenides xychus (Mabille, 1891)
- Caenides benga (Holland, 1891)
- Caenides dacela (Hewitson, 1876)
- Caenides hidaroides Aurivillius, 1896
- Caenides dacena (Hewitson, 1876)
- Monza alberti (Holland, 1896)
- Monza cretacea (Snellen, 1872)
- Monza punctata punctata (Aurivillius, 1910)
- Monza punctata crola Evans, 1937
- Melphina evansi Berger, 1974 (endemic)
- Melphina flavina Lindsey & Miller, 1965
- Melphina hulstaerti Berger, 1974 (endemic)
- Melphina malthina (Hewitson, 1876)
- Melphina unistriga (Holland, 1893)
- Fresna carlo Evans, 1937
- Fresna cojo (Karsch, 1893)
- Fresna netopha (Hewitson, 1878)
- Platylesches batangae (Holland, 1894)
- Platylesches galesa (Hewitson, 1877)
- Platylesches lamba Neave, 1910
- Platylesches langa Evans, 1937
- Platylesches panga Evans, 1937
- Platylesches picanini (Holland, 1894)
- Platylesches robustus Neave, 1910
- Platylesches shona Evans, 1937
- Platylesches hassani Collins & Larsen, 2008

==== Baorini ====
- Brusa allardi Berger, 1967
- Brusa saxicola (Neave, 1910)
- Zenonia anax Evans, 1937
- Zenonia crasta Evans, 1937
- Borbo binga (Evans, 1937)
- Borbo fanta (Evans, 1937)
- Borbo lugens (Hopffer, 1855)
- Borbo perobscura (Druce, 1912)
- Borbo sirena (Evans, 1937)
- Parnara monasi (Trimen & Bowker, 1889)

=== Heteropterinae ===
- Metisella abdeli (Krüger, 1928)
- Metisella alticola (Aurivillius, 1925)
- Metisella angolana cooksoni (Druce, 1905)
- Metisella formosus linda Evans, 1937
- Metisella formosus nyanza Evans, 1937
- Metisella kambove (Neave, 1910)
- Metisella medea Evans, 1937
- Metisella midas (Butler, 1894)
- Metisella willemi (Wallengren, 1857)
- Tsitana wallacei (Neave, 1910)
- Lepella lepeletier (Latreille, 1824)

== See also ==
- List of moths of the Democratic Republic of the Congo
- Wildlife of the Democratic Republic of the Congo
- Royal Museum for Central Africa - location of many type specimens and Virtual Collections
- List of ecoregions in the Democratic Republic of the Congo
