= Euphaedra symphona =

Scientific classification
- Kingdom: Animalia
- Phylum: Arthropoda
- Class: Insecta
- Order: Lepidoptera
- Family: Nymphalidae
- Genus: Euphaedra
- Species: E. symphona

Binomial name
- Euphaedra symphona Bethune-Baker, 1908

Synonyms
- Euphaedra (Proteuphaedra) symphona; Euphaedra medonoides Wichgraf, 1913

Species of butterfly

Euphaedra symphona is a butterfly in the family Nymphalidae. It is found in the Democratic Republic of the Congo (the central part of the country, Uele and northern Kivu).

This species has a wingspan of 64 mm.

== Description ==
E. symphona Baker. The descriptions runs:" male Palpi ochreous below, with a dark lateral stripe, fringed palely with longish hair above; head blackish, with two whitish dots below the antennae and two larger ones above: eye-sockets edged with white. Both the wings deep bronzy green, much deeper in tone near the termen: primaries with the area between the cell and apex darker, with an irregular oblique white stripe from vein 8 to just beyond vein 4, a small white patch at the apex; fringes with fine, short, white internervular intersections. Underside: both wings dull sienna-brown: primaries with two black spots lengthwise in the cell and a smallmne closing its upper extremity; all the white marks of the upperside show through: secondaries with two black spots in the cell and one at the extreme base, all in line; area above vein 8 crimson, below which to the lower margin of the spots is an indefinite patch of pale greyish, with a trace of the usual pale-angled dash between veins 7 and 8 about midway along the former. There is the least trace of a row of subterminal spots in a very slightly paler subterminal area in both wings." I have since had an opportunity of examining a specimen of this interesting species and find that it belongs to the genus Euryphene and is nearly allied to rubrocostata Auriv., with which it also agrees in the colour of the palpi. Congo region: Beni Mawambe.

== Subspecies ==
- Euphaedra symphona symphona (Democratic Republic of the Congo: central, Uele and northern Kivu)
- Euphaedra symphona affabilis Hecq, 1996 (Democratic Republic of the Congo)
