= Stempfferia ginettae =

Scientific classification
- Domain: Eukaryota
- Kingdom: Animalia
- Phylum: Arthropoda
- Class: Insecta
- Order: Lepidoptera
- Family: Lycaenidae
- Genus: Stempfferia
- Species: S. ginettae

Binomial name
- Stempfferia ginettae Libert, 1999

Synonyms
- Stempfferia (Cercenia) ginettae

Species of butterfly

Stempfferia ginettae is a butterfly in the family Lycaenidae. It is found in the Central African Republic, the Democratic Republic of the Congo and Zambia.

== Subspecies ==
- Stempfferia ginettae ginettae (Central African Republic, Democratic Republic of the Congo)
- Stempfferia ginettae meridionalis Libert, 1999 (Democratic Republic of the Congo, Zambia)
