= Cymothoe sassiana =

Scientific classification
- Kingdom: Animalia
- Phylum: Arthropoda
- Class: Insecta
- Order: Lepidoptera
- Family: Nymphalidae
- Genus: Cymothoe
- Species: C. sassiana

Binomial name
- Cymothoe sassiana Schouteden, 1912

Synonyms
- Cymothoe cyclades intermedia Neustetter, 1912

Species of butterfly

Cymothoe sassiana is a butterfly in the family Nymphalidae. It is found in the Democratic Republic of the Congo.

== Subspecies ==
- Cymothoe sassiana sassiana (north-eastern Democratic Republic of the Congo)
- Cymothoe sassiana intermedia Neustetter, 1912 (south-central Democratic Republic of the Congo)
