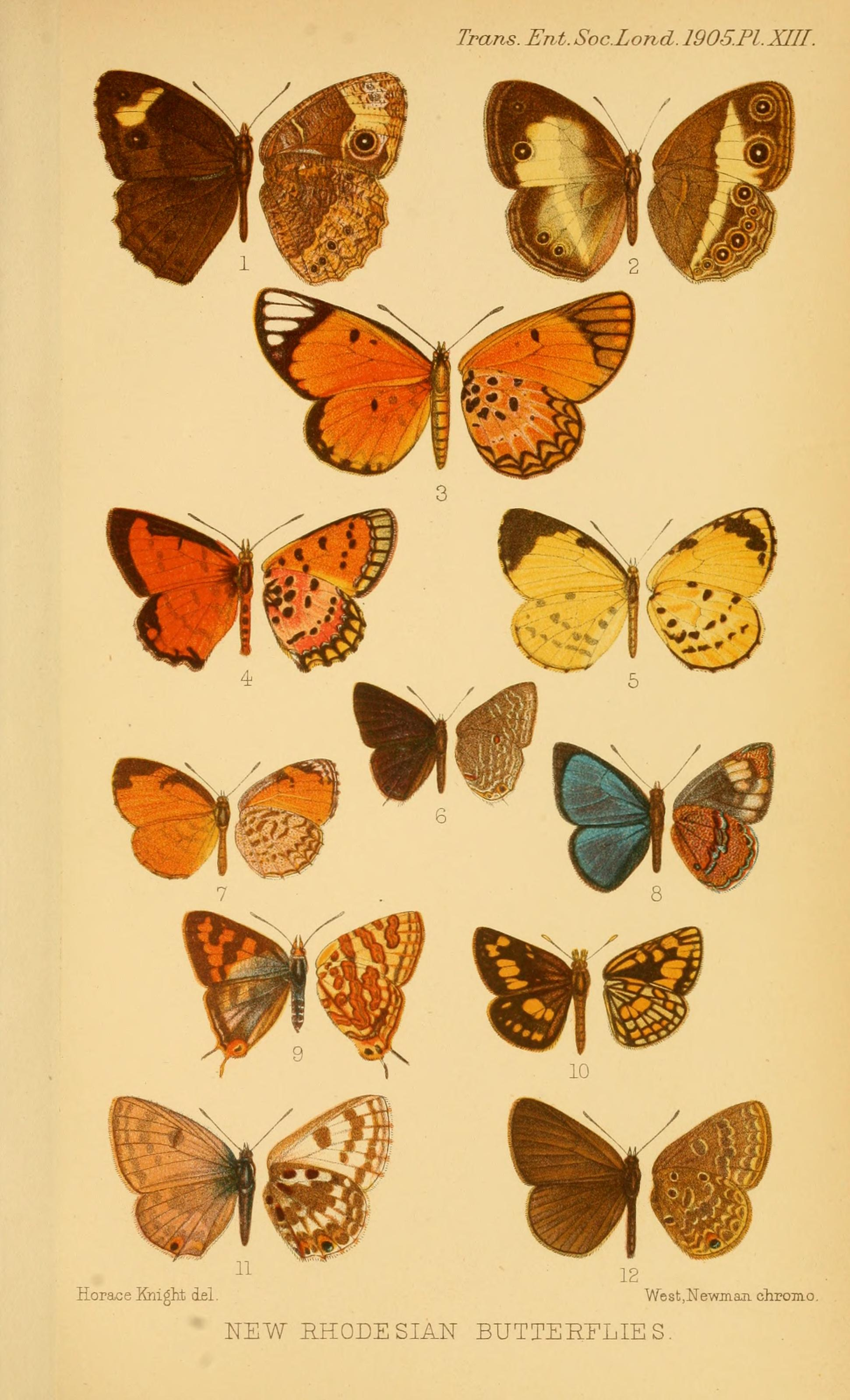
- Figure 3 (accompanying the original description)

Scientific classification
- Kingdom: Animalia
- Phylum: Arthropoda
- Class: Insecta
- Order: Lepidoptera
- Family: Lycaenidae
- Genus: Cooksonia
- Species: C. trimeni

Binomial name
- Cooksonia trimeni H. H. Druce, 1905

= Cooksonia trimeni =

Species of butterfly

Cooksonia trimeni is a butterfly in the family Lycaenidae first described by Hamilton Herbert Druce in 1905. It is found in the Democratic Republic of the Congo.

== Subspecies ==
- Cooksonia trimeni trimeni (Democratic Republic of the Congo)
- Cooksonia trimeni terpsichore Talbot, 1935 (Democratic Republic of the Congo: Shaba)
