= Celaenorrhinus kasai =

Scientific classification
- Kingdom: Animalia
- Phylum: Arthropoda
- Class: Insecta
- Order: Lepidoptera
- Family: Hesperiidae
- Genus: Celaenorrhinus
- Species: C. kasai

Binomial name
- Celaenorrhinus kasai Evans, 1956

Species of butterfly

Celaenorrhinus kasai is a species of butterfly in the family Hesperiidae. It is found in the Democratic Republic of the Congo.

== Subspecies ==
- Celaenorrhinus kasai kasai (Democratic Republic of the Congo: Kasai, Tshuapa and Sankuru)
- Celaenorrhinus kasai kapangana Berger, 1976 (Democratic Republic of the Congo: Katanga)
