= Euphaedra disjuncta =

Scientific classification
- Kingdom: Animalia
- Phylum: Arthropoda
- Clade: Pancrustacea
- Class: Insecta
- Order: Lepidoptera
- Family: Nymphalidae
- Genus: Euphaedra
- Species: E. disjuncta

Binomial name
- Euphaedra disjuncta Hecq, 1984

Synonyms
- Euphaedra (Euphaedrana) disjuncta; Euphaedra preussi ab. albofasciata Rebel, 1914

Species of butterfly

Euphaedra disjuncta is a butterfly in the family Nymphalidae. It is found in the Democratic Republic of the Congo and the Central African Republic.

== Subspecies ==
- Euphaedra disjuncta disjuncta (Democratic Republic of the Congo, Central African Republic)
- Euphaedra disjuncta virens Hecq, 1984 (Democratic Republic of the Congo: Shaba)
