= Euphaedra vicina =

Scientific classification
- Kingdom: Animalia
- Phylum: Arthropoda
- Class: Insecta
- Order: Lepidoptera
- Family: Nymphalidae
- Genus: Euphaedra
- Species: E. vicina

Binomial name
- Euphaedra vicina Hecq, 1984

Synonyms
- Euphaedra (Euphaedrana) vicina; Euphaedra preussi Staudinger, 1891

Species of butterfly

Euphaedra vicina, or the glossy white-striped forester, is a butterfly in the family Nymphalidae. It is found in Nigeria, Cameroon, the Democratic Republic of the Congo and Uganda. The habitat consists of forests.

== Subspecies ==
- Euphaedra vicina vicina (Cameroon to the Democratic Republic of the Congo, Uganda)
- Euphaedra vicina longiqua Hecq, 1984 (Nigeria: Cross River loop)
- Euphaedra vicina pallidoides Hecq, 1984 (Democratic Republic of the Congo: Shaba)
