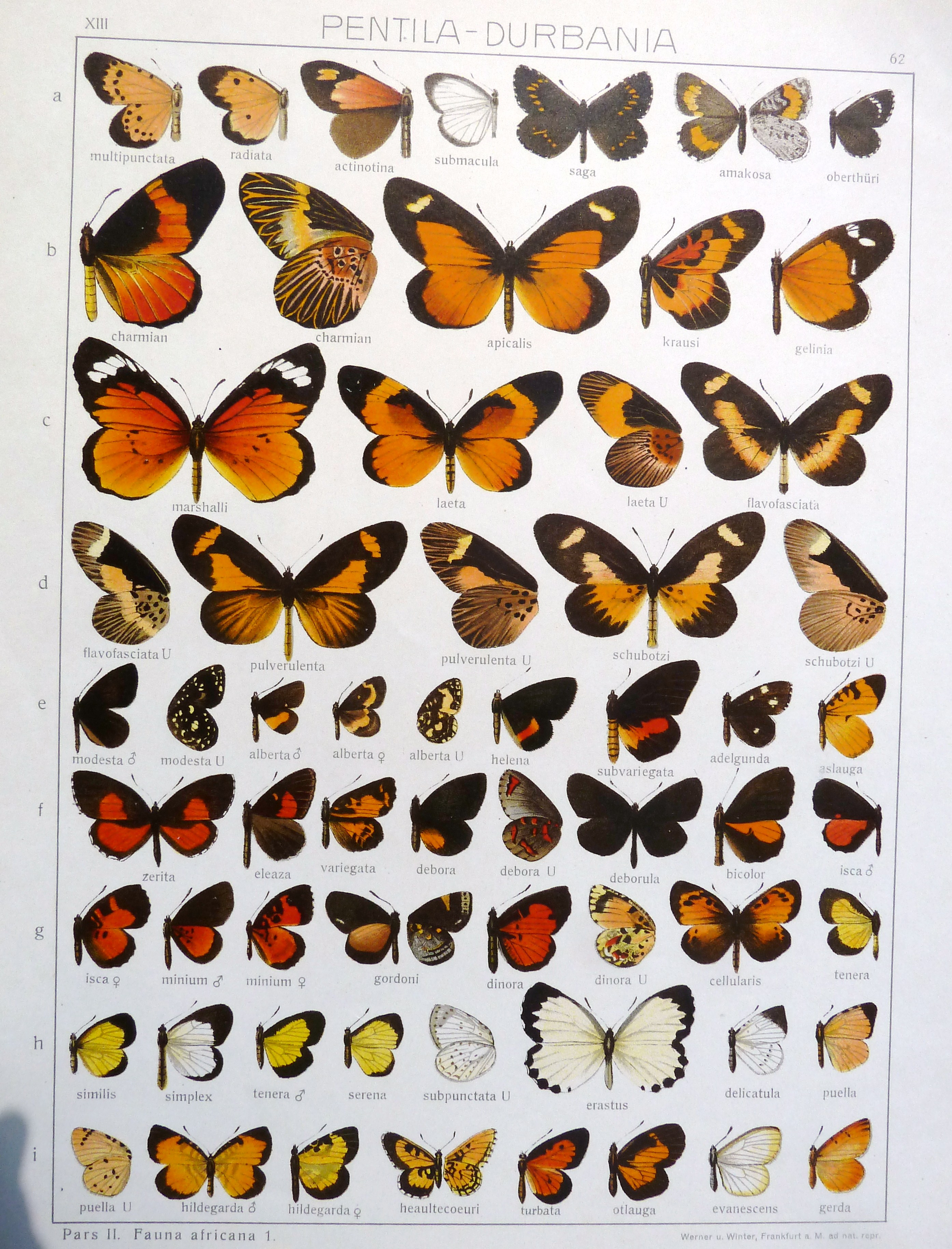
- In Adalbert Seitz's Fauna Africana as laeta

Scientific classification
- Kingdom: Animalia
- Phylum: Arthropoda
- Clade: Pancrustacea
- Class: Insecta
- Order: Lepidoptera
- Family: Lycaenidae
- Genus: Mimacraea
- Species: M. paragora

Binomial name
- Mimacraea paragora Rebel, 1911

Synonyms
- Mimacraea laeta Schultze, 1912

= Mimacraea paragora =

Species of butterfly

Mimacraea paragora is a butterfly in the family Lycaenidae. It is found in Cameroon and the Democratic Republic of the Congo.

== Subspecies ==
- Mimacraea paragora paragora (Cameroon, Democratic Republic of the Congo: north-west of Lake Tanganyika)
- Mimacraea paragora angulata Libert, 2000 (Democratic Republic of the Congo)
