= Euphaedra cuprea =

Scientific classification
- Kingdom: Animalia
- Phylum: Arthropoda
- Class: Insecta
- Order: Lepidoptera
- Family: Nymphalidae
- Genus: Euphaedra
- Species: E. cuprea

Binomial name
- Euphaedra cuprea Hecq, 1980

Synonyms
- Euphaedra (Xypetana) cuprea

Species of butterfly

Euphaedra cuprea is a butterfly in the family Nymphalidae. It is found in Équateur and Sankuru in the Democratic Republic of the Congo.

== Subspecies ==
- Euphaedra cuprea cuprea (Democratic Republic of the Congo: Equateur and Sankuru)
- Euphaedra cuprea irangi Oremans, 2000 (Democratic Republic of the Congo: South Kivu)
- Euphaedra cuprea smaragdula Hecq, 2004 (Democratic Republic of the Congo)
