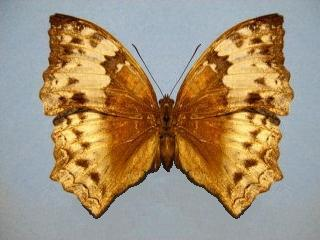

Scientific classification
- Kingdom: Animalia
- Phylum: Arthropoda
- Class: Insecta
- Order: Lepidoptera
- Family: Nymphalidae
- Genus: Cymothoe
- Species: C. orphnina

Binomial name
- Cymothoe orphnina Karsch, 1894

Synonyms
- Cymothoe infuscata Joicey and Talbot, 1928

= Cymothoe orphnina =

Orphnina glider

Species of butterfly

Cymothoe orphnina, the orphnina glider, is a butterfly in the family Nymphalidae. It is found in Nigeria, Cameroon, the Republic of the Congo and the Democratic Republic of the Congo.

== Subspecies ==
- Cymothoe orphnina orphnina (Democratic Republic of the Congo: north-east to Kivu and to the Ituri Forest and Aruwiumi River)
- Cymothoe orphnina suavis Schultze, 1913 (eastern Nigeria, Cameroon, Congo, south-western Democratic Republic of the Congo)
