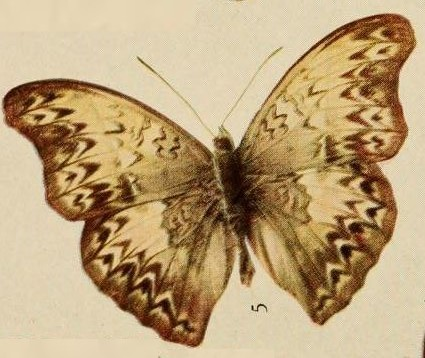

Conservation status
- Least Concern (IUCN 3.1)

Scientific classification
- Kingdom: Animalia
- Phylum: Arthropoda
- Class: Insecta
- Order: Lepidoptera
- Family: Nymphalidae
- Genus: Cymothoe
- Species: C. eris

Binomial name
- Cymothoe eris Aurivillius, 1896

= Cymothoe eris =

Species of butterfly

Cymothoe eris is a butterfly in the family Nymphalidae. It is found in the Republic of the Congo and the Democratic Republic of the Congo.

== Subspecies ==
- Cymothoe eris eris (Congo, Democratic Republic of the Congo: Ubangi)
- Cymothoe eris capellides Holland, 1920 (Democratic Republic of the Congo: Uele, Tshopo, Maniema)
- Cymothoe eris sankuruana Overlaet, 1952 (Democratic Republic of the Congo: south-central to Sankuru)
