= Euriphene butleri =

Scientific classification
- Kingdom: Animalia
- Phylum: Arthropoda
- Class: Insecta
- Order: Lepidoptera
- Family: Nymphalidae
- Genus: Euriphene
- Species: E. butleri

Binomial name
- Euriphene butleri (Aurivillius, 1904)

Synonyms
- Diestogyna butleri Aurivillius, 1904; Euriphene (Euriphene) butleri; Diestogyna amaranta Karsch; Butler, 1902; Diestogyna butleri kivuensis Jackson & Howarth, 1957

Species of butterfly

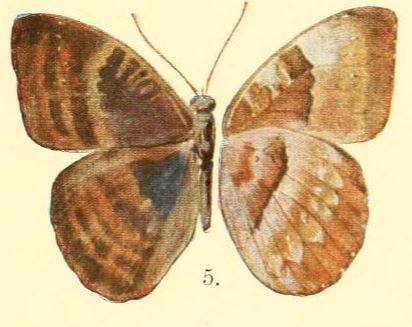

Euriphene butleri is a butterfly in the family Nymphalidae. It is found in the Democratic Republic of the Congo and Uganda.

== Subspecies ==
- Euriphene butleri butleri (Democratic Republic of the Congo: Ituri and Kivu, Uganda: Toro district)
- Euriphene butleri kivuensis (Jackson & Howarth, 1957) (Democratic Republic of the Congo: Kwidgwi Island in Lake Kivu)
- Euriphene butleri remota Hecq, 1994 (Democratic Republic of the Congo)
