= Euphaedra mirabilis =

Scientific classification
- Kingdom: Animalia
- Phylum: Arthropoda
- Class: Insecta
- Order: Lepidoptera
- Family: Nymphalidae
- Genus: Euphaedra
- Species: E. mirabilis

Binomial name
- Euphaedra mirabilis Hecq, 1980

Synonyms
- Euphaedra (Xypetana) mirabilis; Euphaedra xypete ab. mirabilis Bartel, 1905

Species of butterfly

Euphaedra mirabilis is a butterfly in the family Nymphalidae. It is found from Nigeria to the Democratic Republic of the Congo and its eastern range limit of Uganda.

== Description ==
Very close to Euphaedra xypete qv.

== Subspecies ==
- Euphaedra mirabilis mirabilis (Nigeria to the Democratic Republic of the Congo)
- Euphaedra mirabilis lurida Hecq, 1997 (Democratic Republic of the Congo)
- Euphaedra mirabilis nubila Hecq, 1986 (Democratic Republic of the Congo: Uele and Kivu, Uganda: Semuliki National Park)
