= Euphaedra sinuosa =

Scientific classification
- Kingdom: Animalia
- Phylum: Arthropoda
- Class: Insecta
- Order: Lepidoptera
- Family: Nymphalidae
- Genus: Euphaedra
- Species: E. sinuosa

Binomial name
- Euphaedra sinuosa Hecq, 1974

Synonyms
- Euphaedra (Xypetana) sinuosa; Euphaedra plagiaria Hecq, 1980

Species of butterfly

Euphaedra sinuosa is a butterfly in the family Nymphalidae. It is found in the Democratic Republic of the Congo.

== Subspecies ==
- Euphaedra sinuosa sinuosa (Democratic Republic of the Congo: north-east to Uele and northern Kivu)
- Euphaedra sinuosa plagiaria Hecq, 1980 (Democratic Republic of the Congo: Tshopo)
- Euphaedra sinuosa smitsi Hecq, 1991 (Democratic Republic of the Congo: Kasai)
