= Cymothoe meridionalis =

Scientific classification
- Kingdom: Animalia
- Phylum: Arthropoda
- Class: Insecta
- Order: Lepidoptera
- Family: Nymphalidae
- Genus: Cymothoe
- Species: C. meridionalis

Binomial name
- Cymothoe meridionalis Overlaet, 1944

Synonyms
- Cymothoe meridionalis f. vermaki Overlaet, 1944; Cymothoe meridionalis f. ornata Overlaet, 1944; Cymothoe meridionalis f. diffusa Overlaet, 1944

Species of butterfly

Cymothoe meridionalis is a butterfly in the family Nymphalidae. It is found in the Democratic Republic of the Congo.

== Subspecies ==
- Cymothoe meridionalis meridionalis (Democratic Republic of the Congo: south to southern Kabinda and western Lualaba)
- Cymothoe meridionalis ghesquierei Overlaet, 1944 (Democratic Republic of the Congo: east to Maniema and Tshopo)
