= Bematistes leopoldina =

- Bematistes leopoldina and related species

Scientific classification
- Kingdom: Animalia
- Phylum: Arthropoda
- Clade: Pancrustacea
- Class: Insecta
- Order: Lepidoptera
- Family: Nymphalidae
- Genus: Bematistes
- Species: B. leopoldina

Binomial name
- Bematistes leopoldina (Aurivillius, 1895)

Synonyms
- Planema leopoldina Aurivillius, 1895; Acraea leopoldina (Aurivillius, 1895); Acraea (Acraea) leopoldina; Planema poggei brevimacula f. albofasciata Le Doux, 1937; Planema poggei leopoldina f. mixta Le Doux, 1937; Planema poggei brevimacula Talbot, 1928; Planema poggei schoutedeni Le Doux, 1937; Planema macrosticha Bethune-Baker, 1908; Planema leopoldina var. intermissa Gaede, 1916

Species of butterfly

Bematistes leopoldina is a species of butterfly in the family Nymphalidae. It is found in Cameroon, Angola and the Democratic Republic of the Congo.

== Description ==
P. leopoldina Auriv. (59 c) agrees with [related] species in the transverse band of the fore- wing in the male not reaching the hindmargin, but differs in its being 6-7 mm. in breadth and quite continuous and at veins 2 and 3 almost reaching the distal margin; the transverse band is light orange-yellow and the spots in cellules 2 and 3 are broadly conical, distally somewhat emarginate and basally rounded; the ground colour of the upper surface is blackish and the median band of the hindwing is about 10 mm. broad in the middle, proximally rectilinear, distally somewhat excurved, its colour white-yellow above but whitish beneath; the dark marginal band is about 7 mm. in breadth and sharply defined. The female is not known to me. Congo region, near Leopoldville. P. macrosticha Baker is unknown to me, but according to information obligingly furnished by Dr. Jordan it is similar to P. leopoldina. The original description runs "male: Both wings blackish brown, yellowish fawn-colour. Primaries with basal area black to end of cell, with a confluent black spot projecting forwards in the angle of veins 3 and 4; a broad postmedian band of yellowish fawn-colour from costa to termen below vein 3, but not reaching quite into the tornus, i. e. not below vein 1 a; apical area blackish brown to below vein 3: secondaries sooty brown for a restricted basal area, not to the end of the cell; postmedian area very broadly yellowish pale fawn-colour right up to the tornus, invaded by the black veins and also by fine black internervular lines; termen broadly blackish brown at the apex, tapering down very finely to the tornus. Underside : secondaries with base Indian-red, with two or three basal small spots; a median series of four, an irregular curved series of eight spots, those between veins 5 and 6 and 6 and 7 shifted outwards; postmedian band whitish, not half the width of the yellowish band above, rest of area exceedingly broadly brownish grey. Expanse 80 mm." Congo: Makala.

== Subspecies ==
- Bematistes leopoldina leopoldina (Angola, southern Democratic Republic of the Congo)
- Bematistes leopoldina brevimacula (Talbot, 1928) (eastern Democratic Republic of the Congo)
- Bematistes leopoldina macrosticha (Bethune-Baker, 1908) (Cameroon, northern Democratic Republic of the Congo)

== Taxonomy ==
See Pierre & Bernaud, 2014

== Etymology ==
The name honours Leopold II of Belgium, the private owner of the Congo Free State.
