= Charaxes subrubidus =

Scientific classification
- Kingdom: Animalia
- Phylum: Arthropoda
- Class: Insecta
- Order: Lepidoptera
- Family: Nymphalidae
- Genus: Charaxes
- Species: C. subrubidus

Binomial name
- Charaxes subrubidus van Someren, 1972

Synonyms
- Charaxes manica subrubidus van Someren, 1972; Charaxes cedreatis vetula f. pseudosmaragdalis van Someren and Jackson, 1957; Charaxes manica subrubidus f. atribasis van Someren, 1972; Charaxes manica subrubidus f. aubergeri van Someren, 1972; Charaxes manica subrubidus f. sorianoi Auberger and Minig, 1975

Species of butterfly

Charaxes subrubidus, the green demon charaxes, is a butterfly in the family Nymphalidae. It is found in the Republic of the Congo and the Democratic Republic of the Congo (Cataractes, Kinshasa, Kasai, Lualaba, Lomami and Shaba). The habitat consists of woodland savanna.
