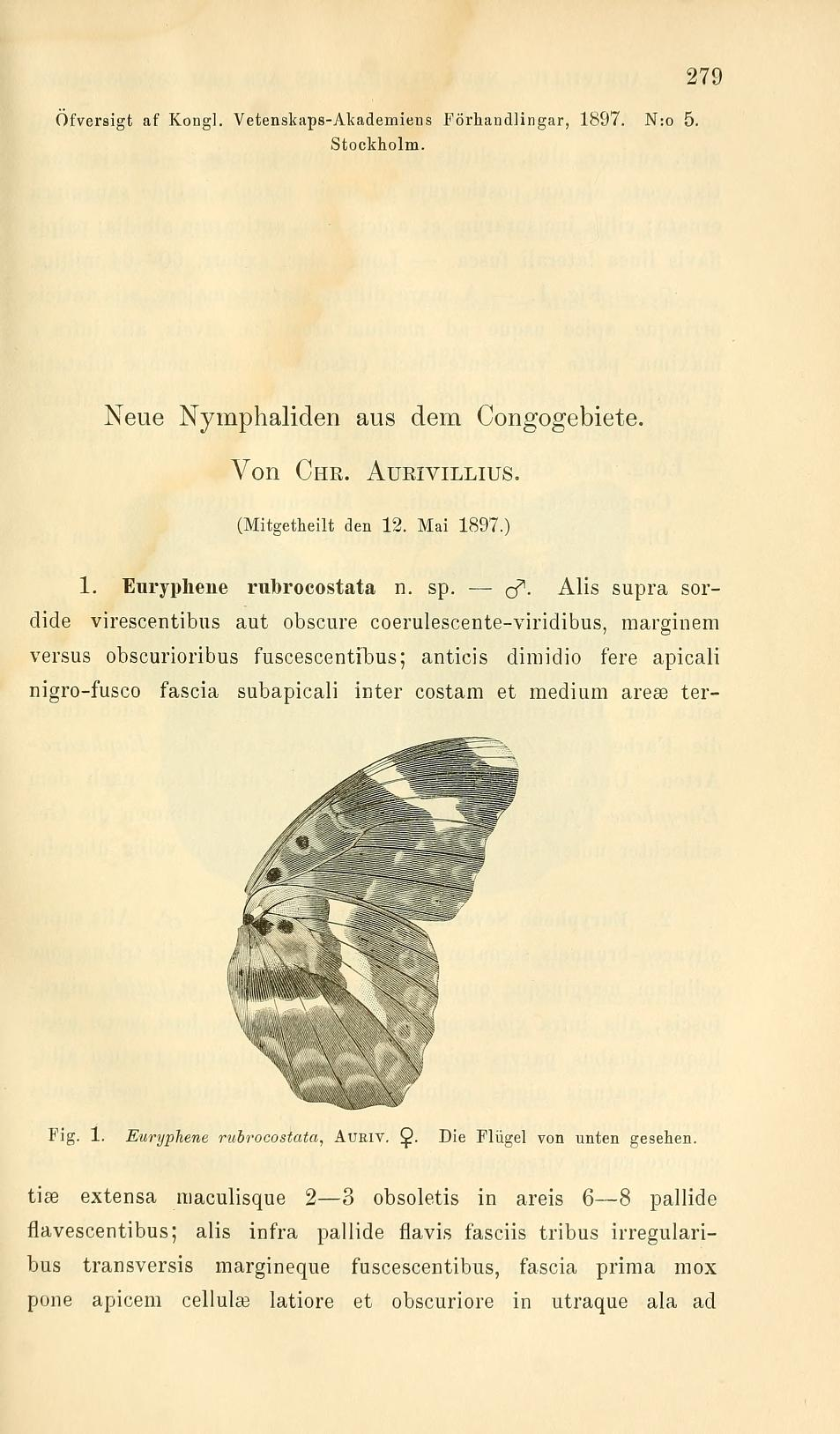
- Figure and part of the original description
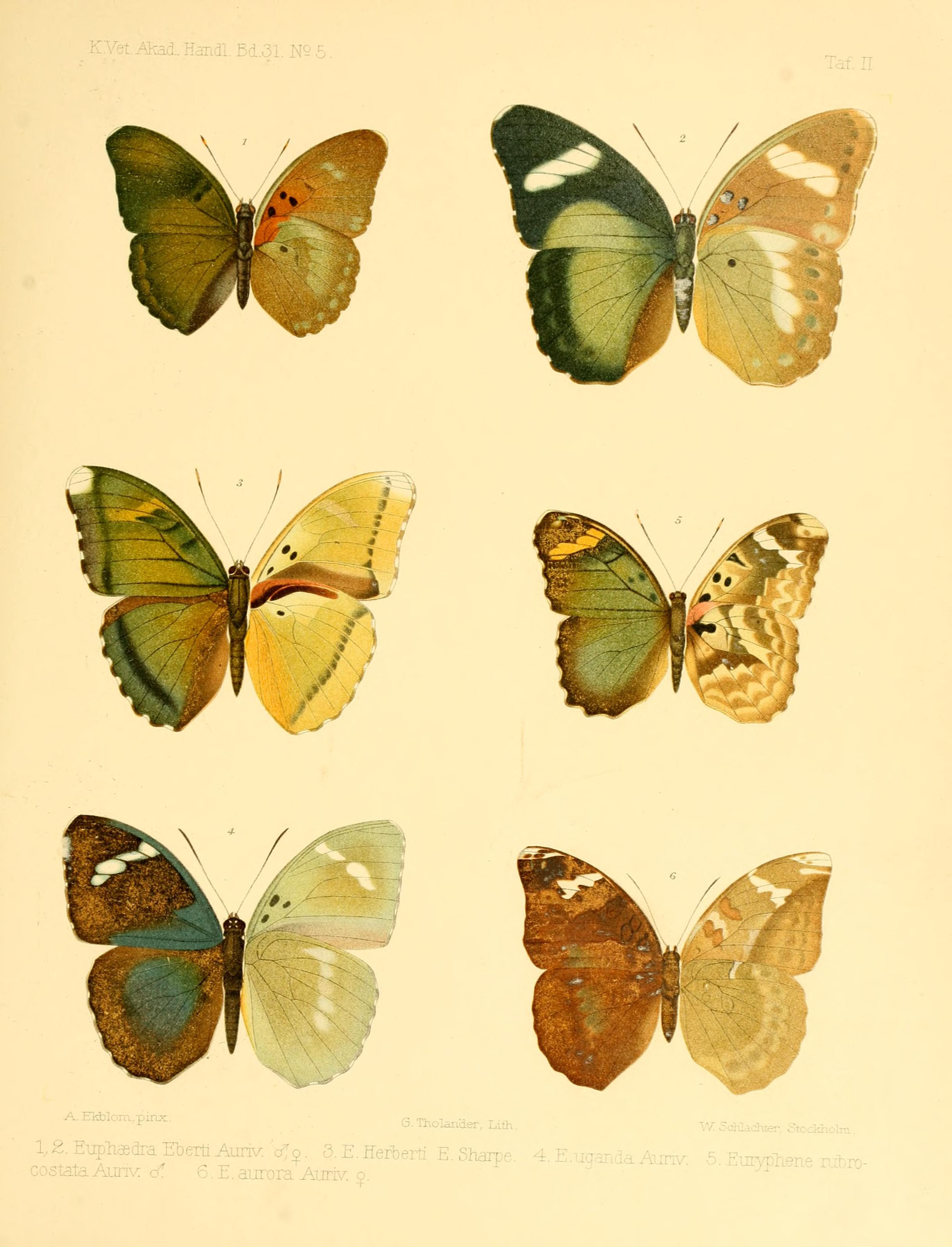
- figured (5) in Rhopalocera Aethiopica Aurivillius, 1895

Scientific classification
- Kingdom: Animalia
- Phylum: Arthropoda
- Class: Insecta
- Order: Lepidoptera
- Family: Nymphalidae
- Genus: Euphaedra
- Species: E. rubrocostata

Binomial name
- Euphaedra rubrocostata (Aurivillius, 1897)

Synonyms
- Euryphene rubrocostata Aurivillius, 1897; Euphaedra (Proteuphaedra) rubrocostata

= Euphaedra rubrocostata =

Species of butterfly

Euphaedra rubrocostata is a butterfly in the family Nymphalidae. It is found in Cameroon, the Central African Republic and the Democratic Republic of the Congo.

== Description ==
E. rubrocostata Auriv. differs from all other Euryphene species in the light red spot at the base of the costal margin on the hindwing beneath, and is also otherwise quite distinctively marked. Both wings brown above, somewhat tinged with yellowish and in the apical part of the forewing blackish; the hindwing is suffused with dull greenish {male) or bluish nearly to the distal margin and the forewing to the apex of the cell; this colour shades distally into the ground-colour without sharp demarcation; the forewing with yellow subapical band about 4 mm. in breadth, extending from the costal margin almost to the middle of cellule 3; the apex of the forewing is in the male black above, with light fringes, in the female broadly white. The under surface is in the male grey-yellow with 2 or 3 round black dots in the cells; the light basal area is bounded on both wings by a broad, irregular, dark brown transverse band, projecting distad in cellules 3 and 4; in the light distal part there are two dull brown transverse bands, the proximal one forming a large quadrate dark brown spot at the costal margin of the forewing. The female differs on the underside in having the ground-colour whitish, but almost entirely suppressed by the much widened, connected black-brown transverse bands with somewhat greenish gloss; the subapical band of the forewing is white and on the hindwing the dark boundary-line of the basal area is distally sharply marked by a broad white transverse band of the ground-colour, which is sharply angled at vein 4 and often interrupted in cellule 3. Hitherto only found in the Congo region on the Sankuru River. Images BOLD

== Subspecies ==
- Euphaedra rubrocostata rubrocostata (Cameroon, Central African Republic, Democratic Republic of the Congo)
- Euphaedra rubrocostata generosa Hecq, 1987 (Democratic Republic of the Congo)
