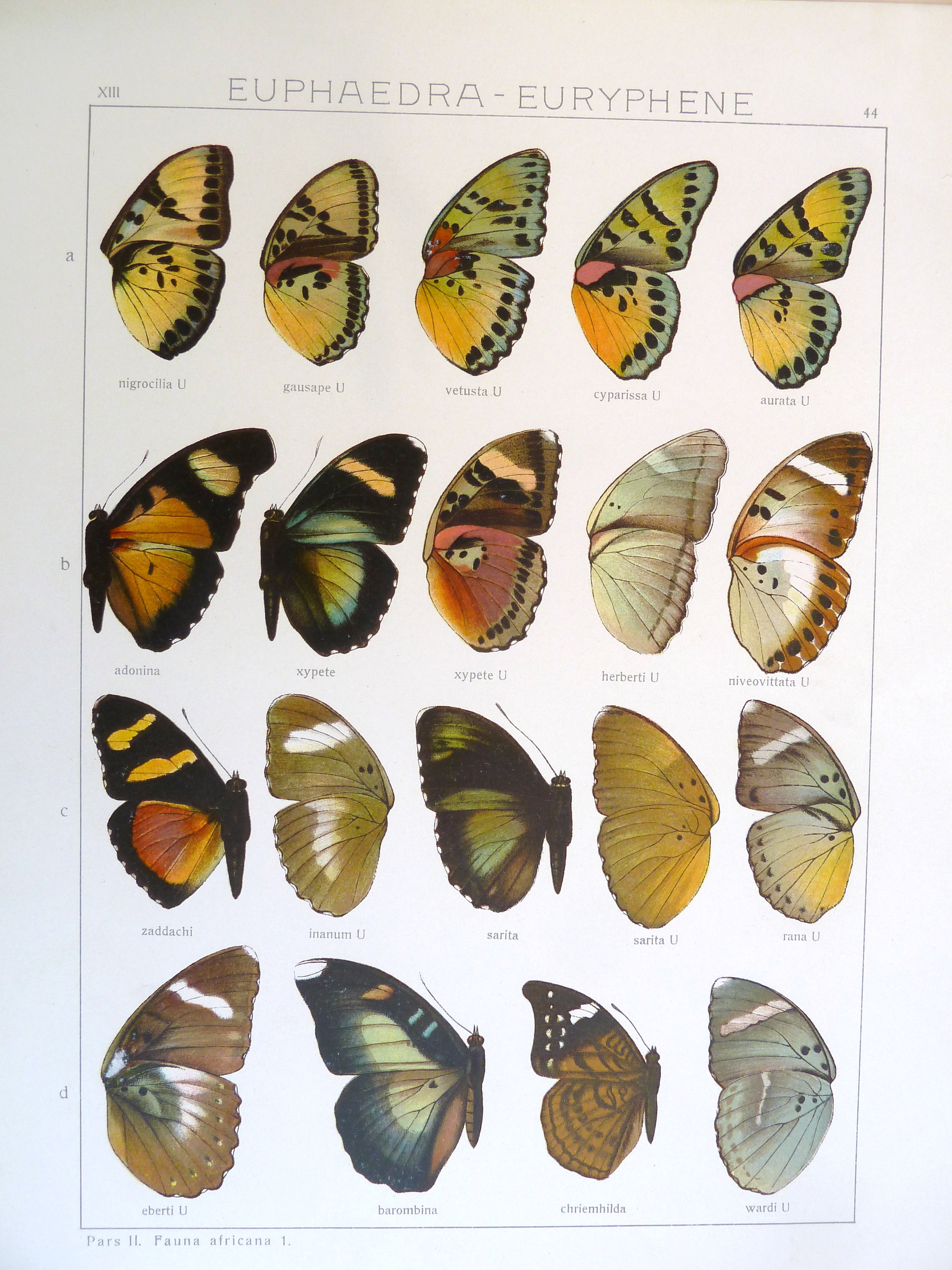
- In Adalbert Seitz's Fauna Africana

Scientific classification
- Kingdom: Animalia
- Phylum: Arthropoda
- Class: Insecta
- Order: Lepidoptera
- Family: Nymphalidae
- Genus: Bebearia
- Species: B. chriemhilda

Binomial name
- Bebearia chriemhilda (Staudinger, 1896)

Synonyms
- Euryphene chriemhilda Staudinger, 1896

= Bebearia chriemhilda =

Species of butterfly

Bebearia chriemhilda is a butterfly in the family Nymphalidae. It is found along the coasts of Kenya and Tanzania. The habitat consists of coastal forests.

E. chriemhilda Stgr. (44 d). The male stands in almost exactly the same relationship to the allied species as zonara males to the other species of the second group; the upper surface is lighter, dark orange-yellow, and the black transverse bands are narrow and almost completely broken up into free spots; in addition the black submarginal line of the hindwing is almost uniformly curved, neither undulate nor dentate; the under surface recalls that of iturina males, but differs in not having the apex of the forewing divided by the dark band. The female very nearly agrees with that of iturina, but has the subapical band of the forewing less dentate and the transverse bands more distinct and differs particularly in the almost uniform, not sharply angled submarginal line on the upperside of the hindwing; the under surface has the ground-colour fleshy grey. Usagara, German East Afrika.

The larvae feed on Hyphaene species. Adults are attracted to fermenting fruit.
