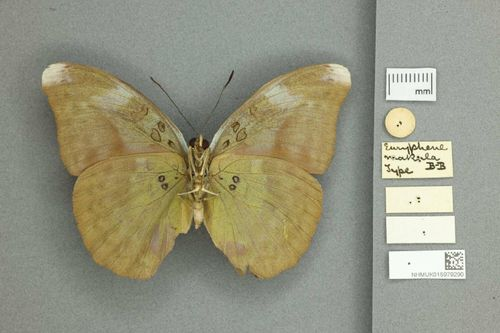

Scientific classification
- Kingdom: Animalia
- Phylum: Arthropoda
- Clade: Pancrustacea
- Class: Insecta
- Order: Lepidoptera
- Family: Nymphalidae
- Genus: Bebearia
- Species: B. makala

Binomial name
- Bebearia makala (Bethune-Baker, 1908)

Synonyms
- Euryphene makala Bethune-Baker, 1908

= Bebearia makala =

Species of butterfly

Bebearia makala is a butterfly in the family Nymphalidae. It is found in Cameroon, the Democratic Republic of the Congo and the Central African Republic.

E. makala Baker agrees with Bebearia luteola, except that the narrow oblique band of the male forewing has developed into a broad subapical patch extending to beyond vein 3. The under-surface of both wings is brownish olive-green with the markings of the upper surface showing through; in the cell, four dark-ringed spots and beyond the middle traces of two dark transverse bands and of the submarginal line; the hind-wing with three sharply outlined black dots in the cell and with indistinct traces of a median band and a submarginal line. Expanse 89 mm. Makala, Congo region

== Subspecies ==
- Bebearia makala makala (northern and eastern Democratic Republic of the Congo, Central African Republic)
- Bebearia makala bosmansi Hecq, 1989 (Cameroon)
