= Bebearia intermedia =

Scientific classification
- Kingdom: Animalia
- Phylum: Arthropoda
- Class: Insecta
- Order: Lepidoptera
- Family: Nymphalidae
- Genus: Bebearia
- Species: B. intermedia

Binomial name
- Bebearia intermedia (Bartel, 1905)

Synonyms
- Euryphene intermedia Bartel, 1905

Species of butterfly

Bebearia intermedia is a butterfly in the family Nymphalidae. It is found in Cameroon, Gabon and the Republic of the Congo.

E. intermedia Bartel is quite near to Bebearia innocua and has only been described in the male. Forewing quite similar in colour and markings to that of Bebearia cutteri, but the light scaling at the costal margin, the base of the subdorsal vein and the inner margin not blue-green but more yellow-green, also much more extended at the latter, nearly reaching vein 2; the outer of the two black streaks in cellule 1 b of innocua is very thin and scarcely represented by more than two black dots; the yellow subapical band is broader, reaching nearly to the middle of cellule 2; hindwing differing from that of innocua in having the entire median part next to the basal area bright yellow-green, almost golden green; the thick black streak at the discocellular is entirely absent and the one placed behind it very faint; spots in the cells similar to those of innocua On the under surface of the forewing the apex is somewhat more broadly scaled with whitish and the anterior part of the yellow band very light, almost whitish; the posterior part is very faint, scarcely showing at all; the black streak in the cell before its end is not straight, but bicurved and very sharply pointed basally; the black marking before the distal margin is very indistinct, scarcely visible; the colouring of the distal area, as also of the hindwing, is more dirty clay-yellow; this colour shades on the hindwing into that of the inner-marginal part, which is dirty ochreous, not bright ochre-yellow; green tones are very restricted on the hindwing, on the other hand the bluish colouring is more prominent; the light spot in the cell is broader, proximally more narrowly, distally more broadly bordered with blackish, the dark colouring here continued more distinctly posteriorly; the short black streak beyond the cell is very strong, more rectangular; the blackish submarginal band is weakly expressed throughout; it is also much further removed from the distal margin than in innocua; the posterior part of the distal margin is lightened with bluish white scales; these are strongest in the lowest part before the inner angle, which appears rather extended bluish, intersected with dark. The hindwing is much broader in proportion than in innocua, the inner angle is not pointed, the margin being much rounded off at veins 2 and l b. A good distinguishing mark is also furnished by the club of the antenna, which is not unicolorous black above, but brown before the tip. Expanse 57 mm. Cameroons: Barombi Station.
