= Bebearia braytoni =

Scientific classification
- Kingdom: Animalia
- Phylum: Arthropoda
- Class: Insecta
- Order: Lepidoptera
- Family: Nymphalidae
- Genus: Bebearia
- Species: B. braytoni

Binomial name
- Bebearia braytoni (Sharpe, 1907)

Synonyms
- Euryphene braytoni Sharpe, 1907

Species of butterfly

Bebearia braytoni is a butterfly in the family Nymphalidae. It is found in the Democratic Republic of the Congo (the Beni-Irumu region) and the Central African Republic.

E. braytoni E. Sharpe The description runs: “Male Fore wing bluish black, the central area metallic blue, costal and hind margins brownish black. The dark apical area relieved by a transverse band of three white hastate spots suffused with pale blue. Hind wing entirely metallic blue, the costa, hind and inner margins, brownish black. Under side: Ground colour brown, with a green suffusion over the upper half of the wing, a submarginal border of brown spots along the hind margin, and two distinct brown spots in the discoidal cell, the white apical band nearly obsolete; the costa at the extreme base bluish white. Hind wing similar in colour to the fore wing, two brown spots in the cell, a whitish spot near the costa, situated near the centre of the wing, followed by a faint white line, but only as far as the first subcostal nervule. Expanse, 2. 7 in. Female.Similar in colour to the male, the metallic blue on both wings somewhat brighter in colour. On the fore wing the white apical band broader and more strongly marked, a white spot at the extreme apex of the wing. Under side exactly similar to that of the male, the brown transverse band on the fore wing more strongly indicated than in the male. Expanse, 3.3 in. This species is allied to the E. sophus Fabr., and E. aurora, Auriv., group, but is distinguished from both by its beautiful blue colour. The sexes are alike, which is not usually the case in this genus.”
