= Bebearia tessmanni =

Scientific classification
- Kingdom: Animalia
- Phylum: Arthropoda
- Class: Insecta
- Order: Lepidoptera
- Family: Nymphalidae
- Genus: Bebearia
- Species: B. tessmanni

Binomial name
- Bebearia tessmanni (Grünberg, 1910)

Synonyms
- Euryphene tessmanni Grünberg, 1910; Bebearia (Bebearia) tessmanni

Species of butterfly

Bebearia tessmanni, or Tessmann's forester, is a butterfly in the family Nymphalidae. It is found in Nigeria, Cameroon, Equatorial Guinea, Gabon, the Republic of the Congo, the Central African Republic and the Democratic Republic of the Congo. The habitat consists of forests.

The species is named after the collector Günter Tessmann.

E. tessmanni Grunb. is also most nearly allied to Bebearia innocua and Bebearia cutteri. In the male the upper surface is dark olive-brown, entirely without marginal band, the black markings and spots similar as in innocua; the markings in the cells only developed as streaks and rings; the brown-yellow subapical band of the forewing less sharp, particularly in the middle part indistinct and without sharp boundary, the distal part between veins 5 and 3 most distinct, but without black central spots. Under surface brown tinged with olivaceous, the basal half of both wings strongly watered with, pale blue; of the black markings in the cells only the fine boundary-lines are present, the centre is scarcely darkened; the markings outside the cell are wanting; the light subapical band of the forewing is only developed in the anterior part and disappears immediately behind vein 6; the white apical spot of the forewing rather small; the narrow white streak between veins 7 and 8 of the hindwing sharp and distinct. The female very similar on the upperside to that of cutteri, the yellow subapical band of the forewing narrower, between veins 5 and 6 4—4.5 mm. in breadth; median area of the hindwing with blue-green reflection, at the middle beyond the cell yellow. Under surface like cutteri in tone of colour, the black markings in the cells and on the discoidal veins less compact, thickly margined with black, but filled in with lighter; the spots of the short black discal band on the hindwing present, somewhat weaker than in cutteri, on the forewing entirely absent; subapical band of the forewing only 4mm. in breadth and white, not yellow as in cutteri-, the submarginal spots in both wings smaller and less sharp. Expanse 58 (male) - 67 (female) mm. Spanish Guinea, at Alcu.

== Subspecies ==
- Bebearia tessmanni tessmanni (Cameroon, Equatorial Guinea, Gabon, Central African Republic)
- Bebearia tessmanni innocuoides Hecq, 2000 (western Nigeria)
- Bebearia tessmanni kwiluensis Hecq, 1989 (Congo, Democratic Republic of the Congo)
