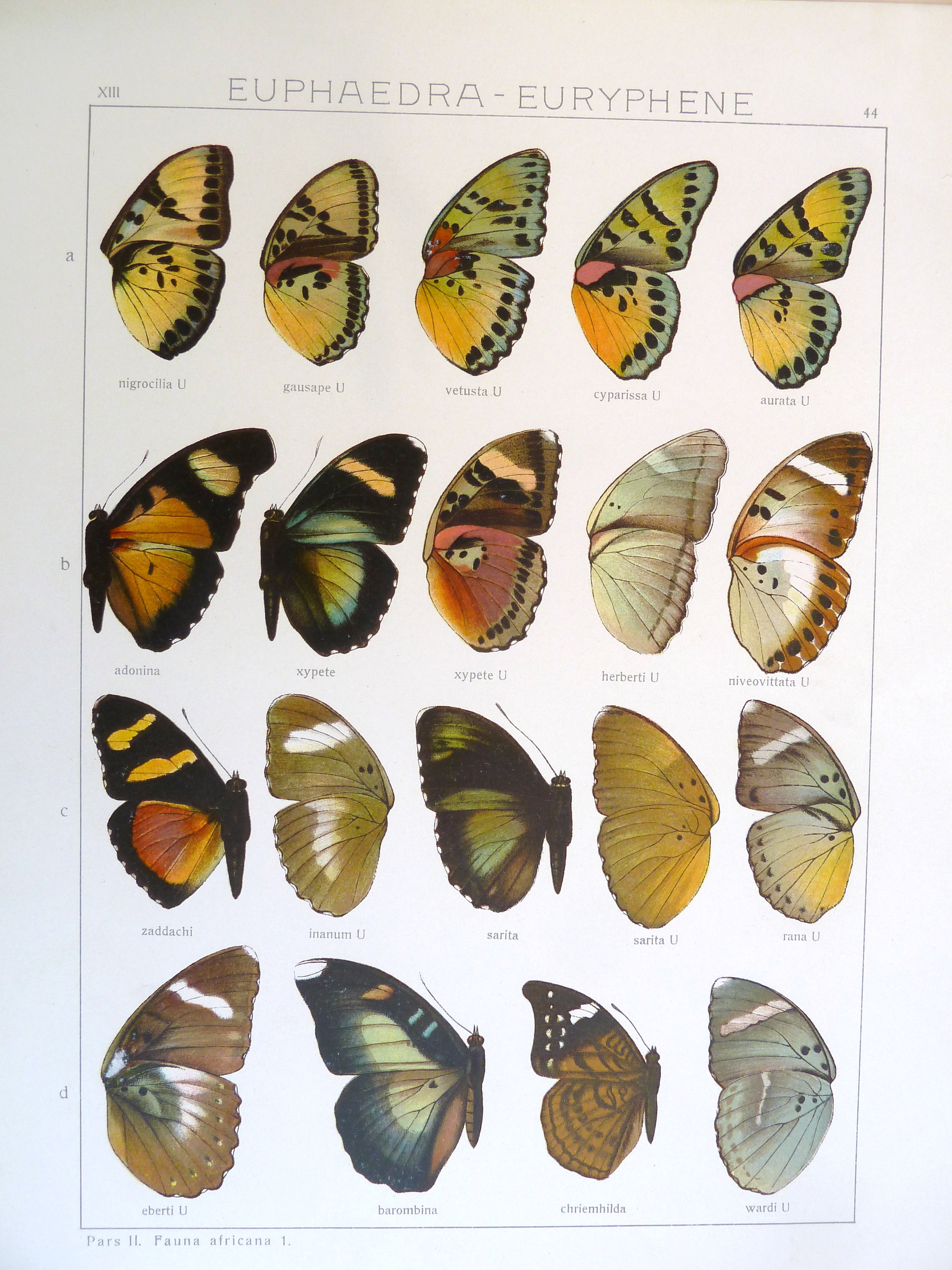
- In Adalbert Seitz's Fauna Africana

Scientific classification
- Kingdom: Animalia
- Phylum: Arthropoda
- Class: Insecta
- Order: Lepidoptera
- Family: Nymphalidae
- Genus: Bebearia
- Species: B. barombina

Binomial name
- Bebearia barombina (Staudinger, 1896)

Synonyms
- Euryphene barombina Staudinger, 1896; Bebearia (Bebearia) barombina; Euphaedra descarpentriesi Fox, 1968

= Bebearia barombina =

Large green forester

Species of butterfly

Bebearia barombina, the large green forester, is a butterfly in the family Nymphalidae. It is found in eastern Nigeria, Cameroon, the Republic of the Congo, the Central African Republic and the south-western part of the Democratic Republic of the Congo. The habitat consists of forests.

E. barombina Stgr. (44 d) is similar to the preceding species [ Bebearia chilonis], but differs in having the subapical band of the forewing entirely absent in the male and in the female only represented by a small yellowish spot near the base of cellules 5 and 6; the green median band is narrower and reaches vein 4 of the forewing; the under surface is darker, greyish green, with two indistinct transverse rows of dark spots in the distal part, but without submarginal line; the white spot at the apex of the forewing very large in the female.This species is also rare and is only found at the Barombi Station in the Cameroons.

Adults feed on fallen fruit.
