= Bebearia jolyana =

Scientific classification
- Kingdom: Animalia
- Phylum: Arthropoda
- Class: Insecta
- Order: Lepidoptera
- Family: Nymphalidae
- Genus: Bebearia
- Species: B. jolyana

Binomial name
- Bebearia jolyana Hecq, 1989

Species of butterfly

Bebearia jolyana is a butterfly in the family Nymphalidae. It is found in south-eastern Cameroon.
