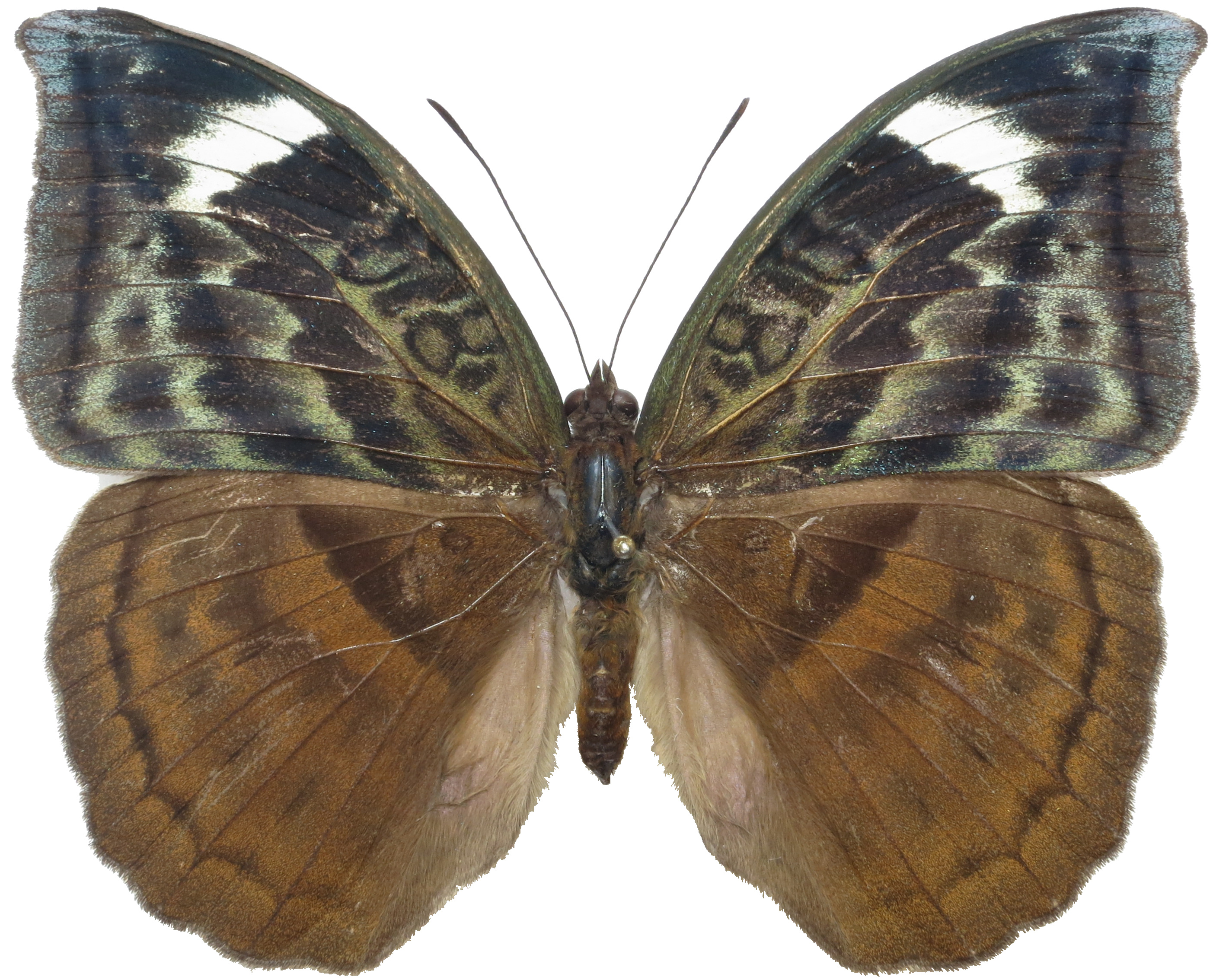
- Male, Mbalmayo, Cameroon

Scientific classification
- Kingdom: Animalia
- Phylum: Arthropoda
- Class: Insecta
- Order: Lepidoptera
- Family: Nymphalidae
- Genus: Bebearia
- Species: B. partita

Binomial name
- Bebearia partita (Aurivillius, 1895)

Synonyms
- Euryphene partita Aurivillius, 1895; Bebearia (Apectinaria) partita; Euryphene aurivillii Staudinger, 1896

= Bebearia partita =

Species of butterfly

Bebearia partita, the falcate forester, is a butterfly in the family Nymphalidae. It is found in Cameroon, the Republic of the Congo, the Democratic Republic of the Congo (Mongala, Uele, Ituri, north Kivu, Tshopo, Equateur, Kinshasa, Cataractes, Kwango, Sankuru and Lualaba) and Uganda (Semuliki National Park and Toro). The habitat consists of forests.

E. partita Auriv. (41 c) differs from all other [Bebearia] species in the sharply defined, common, nearly straight dark transverse band on the under surface, which has quite the same course as in oxione; the under surface is of a delicate, greenish or bluish grey colour with a dark submarginal line on both wings; the hindwing further with a similar line behind the middle. In the male the wings have a dark brown ground-colour above, with distinct transverse bands and a brown-yellow subapical band on the forewing. The female has as distinct black transverse bands on the upperside as the male, but the ground-colour of the forewing is light green and that of the hindwing coffee-brown; the subapical band of the forewing is white and the apex of the wing sharply produced. This very distinct species has been found in the Cameroons and the Congo region.

The larvae feed on Hypselodelphys species.

== Gallery ==
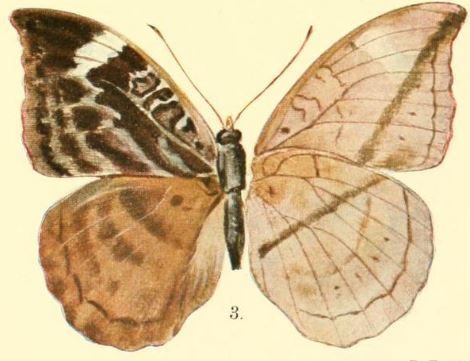
