= Bebearia dallastai =

Scientific classification
- Kingdom: Animalia
- Phylum: Arthropoda
- Class: Insecta
- Order: Lepidoptera
- Family: Nymphalidae
- Genus: Bebearia
- Species: B. dallastai

Binomial name
- Bebearia dallastai Hecq, 1994

Synonyms
- Bebearia (Apectinaria) dallastai

Species of butterfly

Bebearia dallastai, Dall'Asta's forester, is a butterfly in the family Nymphalidae. It is found in eastern Ivory Coast. The habitat consists of mainly forests.
