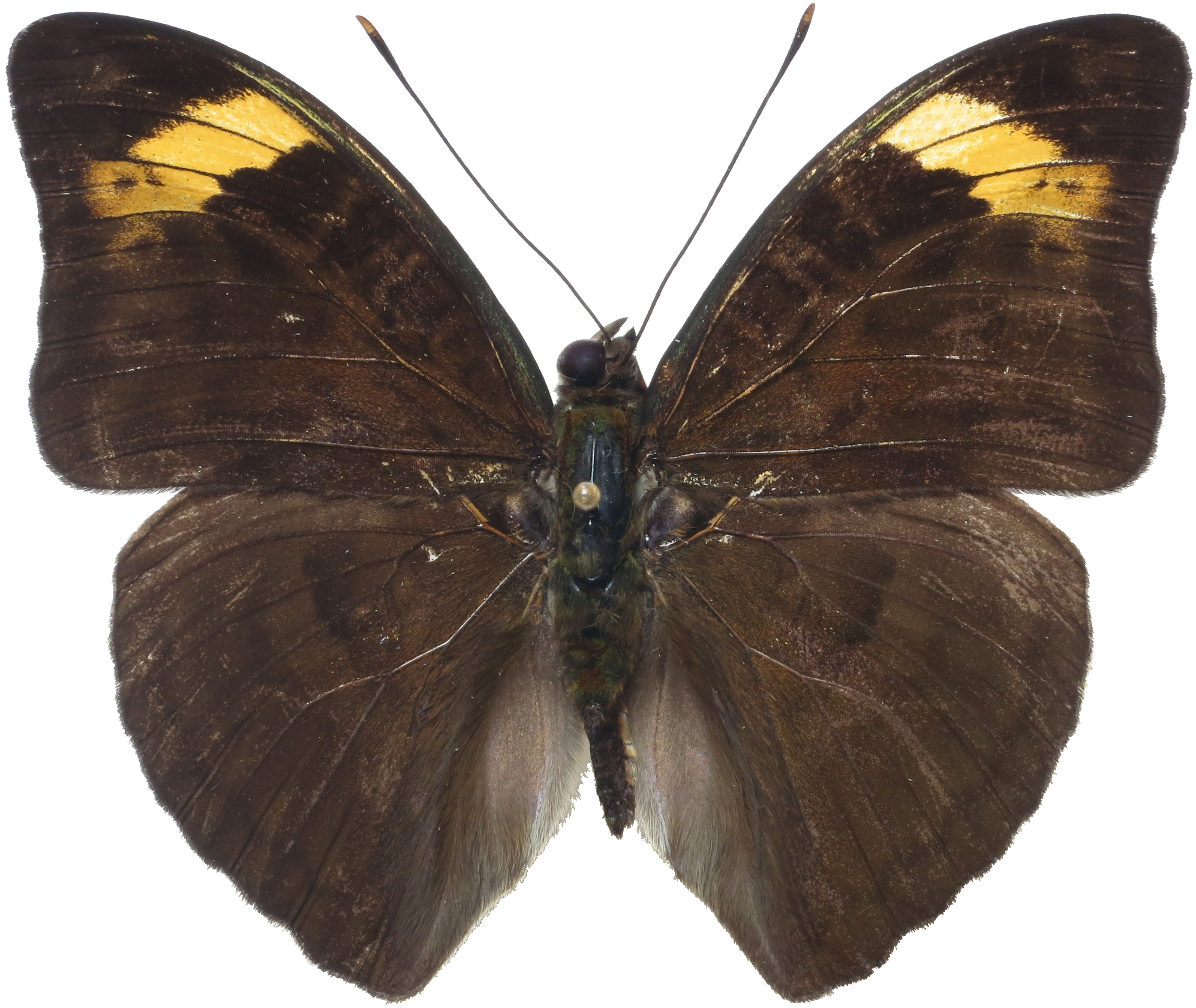
- Male – Mbalmayo, Cameroon

Scientific classification
- Kingdom: Animalia
- Phylum: Arthropoda
- Class: Insecta
- Order: Lepidoptera
- Family: Nymphalidae
- Genus: Bebearia
- Species: B. nivaria

Binomial name
- Bebearia nivaria (Ward, 1871)

Synonyms
- Euryphene nivaria Ward, 1871; Bebearia (Bebearia) nivaria; Euryphene suffumigata Holland, 1893

= Bebearia nivaria =

Species of butterfly

Bebearia nivaria, the bicolour forester, is a butterfly in the family Nymphalidae. It is found in Nigeria, Cameroon, Gabon, the Republic of the Congo, the Central African Republic and the Democratic Republic of the Congo. The habitat consists of primary forests.

Seitz- E. nivaria Ward (40 e) is a very rare species of large size; the under surface is very striking on account of the sharp contrast between the light green basal part and the dark green colour. Cameroons to the Kuilu River.

== Subspecies ==
- Bebearia nivaria nivaria (Nigeria, Cameroon, Gabon, Congo, Central African Republic, western Democratic Republic of the Congo)
- Bebearia nivaria tenuimacula Berger, 1981 (Democratic Republic of the Congo: Mongala, Uele, Tshopo, north Kivu, Equateur and Sankuru)

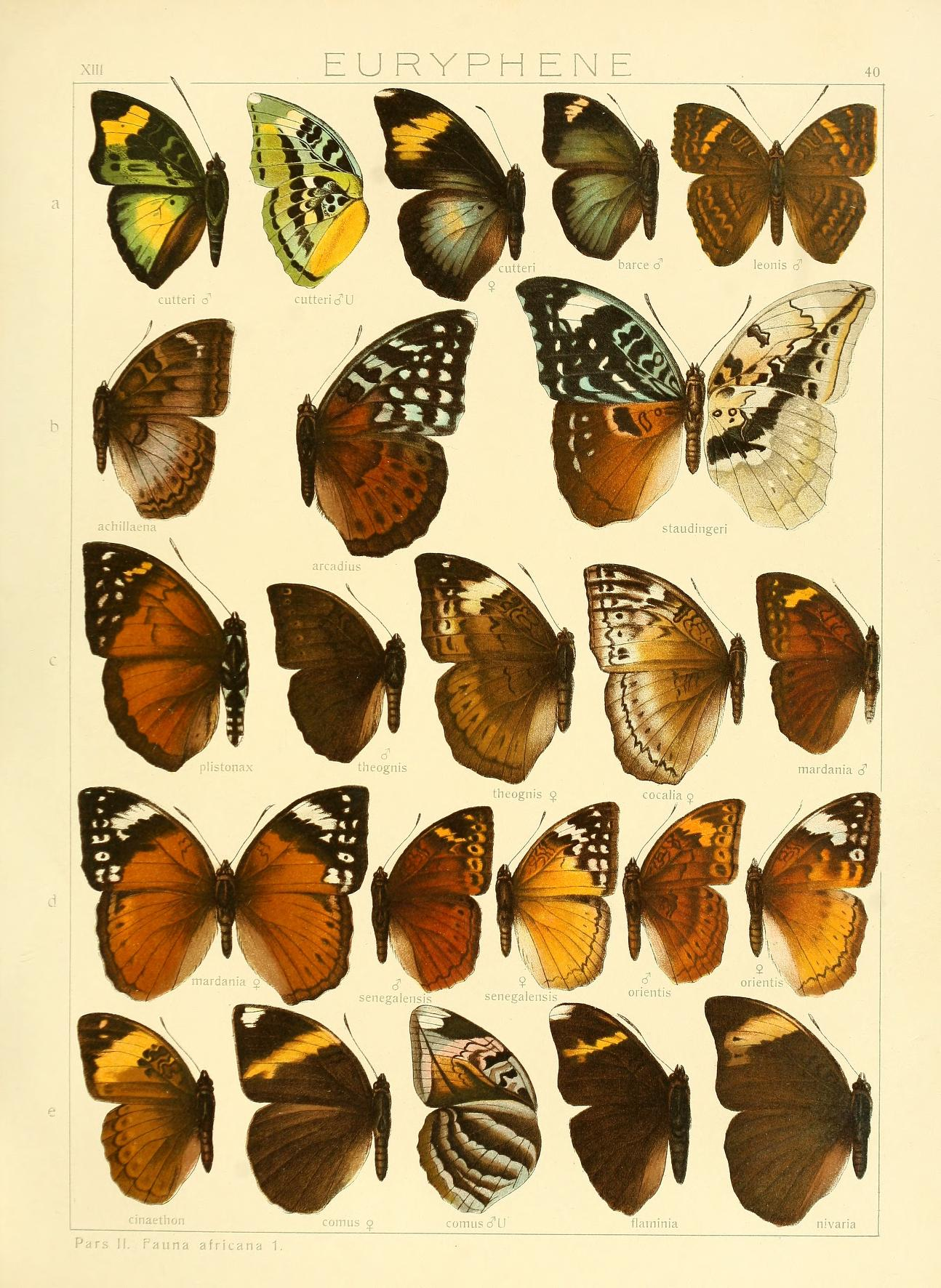
Bebearia nivaria in Adalbert Seitz's Fauna Africana
