= Bebearia phantasiella =

Scientific classification
- Kingdom: Animalia
- Phylum: Arthropoda
- Class: Insecta
- Order: Lepidoptera
- Family: Nymphalidae
- Genus: Bebearia
- Species: B. phantasiella

Binomial name
- Bebearia phantasiella (Staudinger, 1891)

Synonyms
- Euryphene phantasiella Staudinger, 1891; Bebearia (Bebearia) phantasiella; Euryphene phantasiella simulata van Someren, 1939

Species of butterfly

Bebearia phantasiella, the fantasiella, is a butterfly in the family Nymphalidae. It is found in Nigeria, Cameroon, Uganda and Tanzania. The habitat consists of forests.

The fore wing beneath at the distal margin more or less darkened, olive-green; the dark distal area with its proximal margin curved. Wings beneath at least in the cell with more or less distinct dark markings. Wings above with the usual dark transverse bands very distinct. Smaller species, 50—55 mm.

== Subspecies ==
- Bebearia phantasiella phantasiella (Nigeria, Cameroon)
- Bebearia phantasiella simulata (van Someren, 1939) (Uganda, Tanzania: western shores of Lake Victoria)
