= Bebearia vandeweghei =

Scientific classification
- Kingdom: Animalia
- Phylum: Arthropoda
- Class: Insecta
- Order: Lepidoptera
- Family: Nymphalidae
- Genus: Bebearia
- Species: B. vandeweghei

Binomial name
- Bebearia vandeweghei Hecq, 2005

Species of butterfly

Bebearia vandeweghei is a butterfly in the family Nymphalidae. It is found in Gabon.
