= Bebearia romboutsi =

Scientific classification
- Kingdom: Animalia
- Phylum: Arthropoda
- Class: Insecta
- Order: Lepidoptera
- Family: Nymphalidae
- Genus: Bebearia
- Species: B. romboutsi

Binomial name
- Bebearia romboutsi Hecq, 2001

Species of butterfly

Bebearia romboutsi is a butterfly in the family Nymphalidae. It is found in the Democratic Republic of the Congo.
