= Bebearia juno =

Scientific classification
- Kingdom: Animalia
- Phylum: Arthropoda
- Class: Insecta
- Order: Lepidoptera
- Family: Nymphalidae
- Genus: Bebearia
- Species: B. juno

Binomial name
- Bebearia juno Hecq, 1990

Synonyms
- Bebearia wilwerthi juno Hecq, 1990

Species of butterfly

Bebearia juno is a butterfly in the family Nymphalidae. It is found in the Democratic Republic of the Congo, the Central African Republic and Cameroon.
