= Bebearia denticula =

Scientific classification
- Kingdom: Animalia
- Phylum: Arthropoda
- Class: Insecta
- Order: Lepidoptera
- Family: Nymphalidae
- Genus: Bebearia
- Species: B. denticula

Binomial name
- Bebearia denticula Hecq, 2000

Synonyms
- Bebearia (Bebearia) denticula

Species of butterfly

Bebearia denticula is a butterfly in the family Nymphalidae. It is found in Nigeria.
