= Bebearia peetersi =

Scientific classification
- Kingdom: Animalia
- Phylum: Arthropoda
- Class: Insecta
- Order: Lepidoptera
- Family: Nymphalidae
- Genus: Bebearia
- Species: B. peetersi

Binomial name
- Bebearia peetersi Hecq, 1994

Species of butterfly

Bebearia peetersi is a butterfly in the family Nymphalidae. It is found in the Central African Republic (the Sangba Reserve) and northern Cameroon.
