= Bebearia osyris =

Winifred's forester

Scientific classification
- Kingdom: Animalia
- Phylum: Arthropoda
- Clade: Pancrustacea
- Class: Insecta
- Order: Lepidoptera
- Family: Nymphalidae
- Genus: Bebearia
- Species: B. osyris

Binomial name
- Bebearia osyris (Schultze, 1920)

Synonyms
- Euryphura tentyris f. osyris Schultze, 1920; Bebearia (Apectinaria) osyris; Najas tentyris winifredae Fox, 1965; Bebearia winifredae; Bebearia tentyris winifredae

Species of butterfly

Bebearia osyris, or Winifred's forester, is a butterfly in the family Nymphalidae. It is found in Guinea, Sierra Leone, Liberia, Ivory Coast and Ghana. The habitat consists of primary forests.

Adults are attracted to fruit.

Torben Larsen developed a species numbering system for his 2005 publication Butterflies of West Africa. This species is #996. The 'Larsen' numbers have since been used with permission in A Sharp Eye on Butterflies of Ghana.
