= Bebearia =

Scientific classification
- Kingdom: Animalia
- Phylum: Arthropoda
- Clade: Pancrustacea
- Class: Insecta
- Order: Lepidoptera
- Family: Nymphalidae
- Subfamily: Limenitidinae
- Tribe: Adoliadini
- Genus: Bebearia; Hemming, 1960

Species
- Numerous, see text

Genus of brush-footed butterflies

Bebearia is a genus of brush-footed butterflies. The species are confined to the Afrotropical realm, mainly in the Guinean Forests of West Africa and the Congolian forests.

The genus Bebearia closely resembles the allied genus Euphaedra in appearance. The females, especially, are very similar on their uppersides. The undersides of Bebearia however are invariably cryptically patterned and often resemble dead leaves. In Euphaedra the underside is usually yellow with black spots and pink basal patches. Euphaedra have orange palpi while those of Bebearia are brown. In Euphaedra the forewing apex is always rounded and not falcate (sickle shaped). As in Euphaedra the upper side of the wing of Bebearia is usually coloured in metallic blue or green, bright red or orange, or it is dark brownish. Some species are nearly black with blue reflections.The underside of Bebearia can have a metallic sheen. The member species are diverse.

== Taxonomy ==
The type species of the genus is Euryphene iturina Karsch.

== Species groups ==
Defining species groups is a convenient way of subdividing well-defined genera with a large number of recognized species. Bebearia species are so arranged in assemblages called "species groups" (not superspecies, but an informal phenetic arrangement). These may or may not be clades. As molecular phylogenetic studies continue, lineages distinct enough to warrant some formal degree of recognition become evident and new groupings are suggested, but consistent ranking remains a problem.

== Species ==
- Subgenus Apectinaria Hecq, 1990
  - The tentyris species group
    - Bebearia abesa (Hewitson, 1869)
    - Bebearia absolon (Fabricius, 1793)
    - Bebearia amieti Hecq, 1994
    - Bebearia carshena (Hewitson, 1871)
    - Bebearia dallastai Hecq, 1994
    - Bebearia languida (Schultze, 1920)
    - Bebearia lucayensis Hecq, 1996
    - Bebearia mandinga (C. & R. Felder, 1860)
    - Bebearia micans Hecq, 1987
    - Bebearia osyris (Schultze, 1920)
    - Bebearia oxione (Hewitson, 1866)
    - Bebearia partita (Aurivillius, 1895)
    - Bebearia subtentyris (Strand, 1912)
    - Bebearia tentyris (Hewitson, 1866)
    - Bebearia zonara (Butler, 1871)
  - The comus species group
    - Bebearia cinaethon (Hewitson, 1874)
    - Bebearia comus (Ward, 1871)
    - Bebearia ikelemba (Aurivillius, 1901)
  - The mardania species group
    - Bebearia cocalia (Fabricius, 1793)
    - Bebearia cocalioides Hecq, 1990
    - Bebearia guineensis (C. & R. Felder, 1867)
    - Bebearia mardania (Fabricius, 1793)
    - Bebearia orientis (Karsch, 1895)
    - Bebearia senegalensis (Herrich-Schäffer, 1850)
  - The sophus species group
    - Bebearia sophus (Fabricius, 1793)
  - The barce species group
    - Bebearia barce (Doubleday, 1847)
  - The staudingeri species group
    - Bebearia staudingeri (Aurivillius, 1893)
  - The plistonax species group
    - Bebearia arcadius (Fabricius, 1793)
    - Bebearia plistonax (Hewitson, 1874)
  - The elpinice species group
    - Bebearia elpinice (Hewitson, 1869)
    - Bebearia hassoni Hecq, 1998
  - Unknown species group
    - Bebearia paludicola Holmes, 2001
- Subgenus Bebearia
  - The brunhilda species group
    - Bebearia allardi Hecq, 1989
    - Bebearia brunhilda (Kirby, 1889)
    - Bebearia chriemhilda (Staudinger, 1895)
    - Bebearia congolensis (Capronnier, 1889)
    - Bebearia cottoni (Bethune-Baker, 1908)
    - Bebearia dowsetti Hecq, 1990
    - Bebearia fontainei Berger, 1981
    - Bebearia fulgurata (Aurivillius, 1904)
    - Bebearia hargreavesi D'Abrera, 1980
    - Bebearia laetitioides (Joicey & Talbot, 1921)
    - Bebearia schoutedeni (Overlaet, 1954)
  - The severini species group
    - Bebearia aurora (Aurivillius, 1896)
    - Bebearia discors Hecq, 1994
    - Bebearia improvisa Hecq, 2000
    - Bebearia juno Hecq, 1990
    - Bebearia kiellandi Hecq, 1993
    - Bebearia laetitia (Plötz, 1880)
    - Bebearia oremansi Hecq, 1994
    - Bebearia peetersi Hecq, 1994
    - Bebearia phranza (Hewitson, 1865)
    - Bebearia severini (Aurivillius, 1898)
    - Bebearia tessmanni (Grünberg, 1910)
  - The flaminia species group
    - Bebearia bioculata Hecq, 1998
    - Bebearia defluera Hecq, 1998
    - Bebearia denticula Hecq, 2000
    - Bebearia ducarmei Hecq, 1988
    - Bebearia flaminia (Staudinger, 1891)
    - Bebearia intermedia (Bartel, 1905)
    - Bebearia liberti Hecq, 1998
    - Bebearia maximiana (Staudinger, 1891)
    - Bebearia nivaria (Ward, 1871)
  - The phantasia species group
    - Bebearia demetra (Godart, 1819)
    - Bebearia leptotypa (Bethune-Baker, 1908)
    - Bebearia maledicta (Strand, 1912)
    - Bebearia phantasia (Hewitson, 1865)
    - Bebearia phantasiella (Staudinger, 1891)
    - Bebearia phantasina (Staudinger, 1891)
    - Bebearia tini Oremans, 1998
  - The cutteri species group
    - Bebearia ashantina (Dudgeon, 1913)
    - Bebearia barombina (Staudinger, 1895)
    - Bebearia baueri Hecq, 2000
    - Bebearia braytoni (Sharpe, 1907)
    - Bebearia chilonis (Hewitson, 1874)
    - Bebearia chloeropis (Bethune-Baker, 1908)
    - Bebearia cutteri (Hewitson, 1865)
    - Bebearia eliensis (Hewitson, 1866)
    - Bebearia equatorialis Hecq, 1989
    - Bebearia faraveli Oremans, 1998
    - Bebearia innocua Grose-Smith & Kirby, 1889
    - Bebearia jolyana Hecq, 1989
    - Bebearia luteola (Bethune-Baker, 1908)
    - Bebearia makala (Bethune-Baker, 1908)
    - Bebearia octogramma (Grose-Smith & Kirby, 1889)
    - Bebearia picturata Hecq, 1989
    - Bebearia raeveli Hecq, 1989
  - Unknown species group
    - Bebearia fontaineana Hecq, 1987
    - Bebearia inepta Hecq, 2001
    - Bebearia occitana Hecq, 1989
    - Bebearia omo Larsen & Warren, 2005
    - Bebearia warrengashi Hecq, 2000
- Unknown subgenus
  - Bebearia bouyeri van de Weghe, 2007
  - Bebearia castanea (Holland, 1893)
  - Bebearia ducalis (Grünberg, 1912)
  - Bebearia ivindoensis van de Weghe, 2007
  - Bebearia lopeensis van de Weghe, 2007
  - Bebearia pulchella Hecq, 2006
  - Bebearia romboutsi Hecq, 2001
  - Bebearia vandeweghei Hecq, 2005
