= Bebearia baueri =

Scientific classification
- Kingdom: Animalia
- Phylum: Arthropoda
- Class: Insecta
- Order: Lepidoptera
- Family: Nymphalidae
- Genus: Bebearia
- Species: B. baueri

Binomial name
- Bebearia baueri Hecq, 2000

Species of butterfly

Bebearia baueri is a butterfly in the family Nymphalidae. It is found in the Republic of the Congo, Gabon and southern Cameroon.
