= Bebearia discors =

Scientific classification
- Kingdom: Animalia
- Phylum: Arthropoda
- Class: Insecta
- Order: Lepidoptera
- Family: Nymphalidae
- Genus: Bebearia
- Species: B. discors

Binomial name
- Bebearia discors Hecq, 1994

Species of butterfly

Bebearia discors is a butterfly in the family Nymphalidae. It is found in Cameroon and the Democratic Republic of the Congo (Uele and Sankuru).
