= Bebearia dowsetti =

Scientific classification
- Kingdom: Animalia
- Phylum: Arthropoda
- Class: Insecta
- Order: Lepidoptera
- Family: Nymphalidae
- Genus: Bebearia
- Species: B. dowsetti

Binomial name
- Bebearia dowsetti Hecq, 1990

Species of butterfly

Bebearia dowsetti is a butterfly in the family Nymphalidae. It is found in Rwanda.
