= Bebearia chloeropis =

Scientific classification
- Kingdom: Animalia
- Phylum: Arthropoda
- Class: Insecta
- Order: Lepidoptera
- Family: Nymphalidae
- Genus: Bebearia
- Species: B. chloeropis

Binomial name
- Bebearia chloeropis (Bethune-Baker, 1908)

Synonyms
- Euryphene chloeropis Bethune-Baker, 1908

Species of butterfly

Bebearia chloeropis is a butterfly in the family Nymphalidae. It is found in the Republic of the Congo, the Central African Republic, the Democratic Republic of the Congo (Uele, Ituri, north Kivu, Equateur, Sankuru) and Uganda (the Bwamba Valley and Toro).

E. chloeropis Baker. Male Both wings bronzy blue-green above; forewing with the base of the cell filled up by a black patch and beyond this with a narrow undulate dash, followed by two spots; the cell closed by a largish spot and the cellules beyond filled up with black for a short distance; this black colour is continued as a cloudy band to the hinder angle; a black spot in the basal part of cellule 2; apical part blackish with a small white spot at the apex. Hindwing with a broad black marginal band, with a greenish hue in certain lights. Beneath both wings are dirty greenish; the forewing at the base of the costal margin light bluish, with two spots in the middle and one at the apex of the cell, all outlined with black; an indistinct postmedian transverse stripe between vein 4 and the hindmargin; the apex with some small white spots; the hindwing with two dark rings in the cell and the inner margin with yellow hairs. Expanse 72 mm. Congo: Makala.
