= Bebearia castanea =

Scientific classification
- Kingdom: Animalia
- Phylum: Arthropoda
- Class: Insecta
- Order: Lepidoptera
- Family: Nymphalidae
- Genus: Bebearia
- Species: B. castanea

Binomial name
- Bebearia castanea (Holland, 1893)

Synonyms
- Euryphene castanea Holland, 1893

Species of butterfly

Bebearia castanea is a butterfly in the family Nymphalidae. It is found in Gabon.
