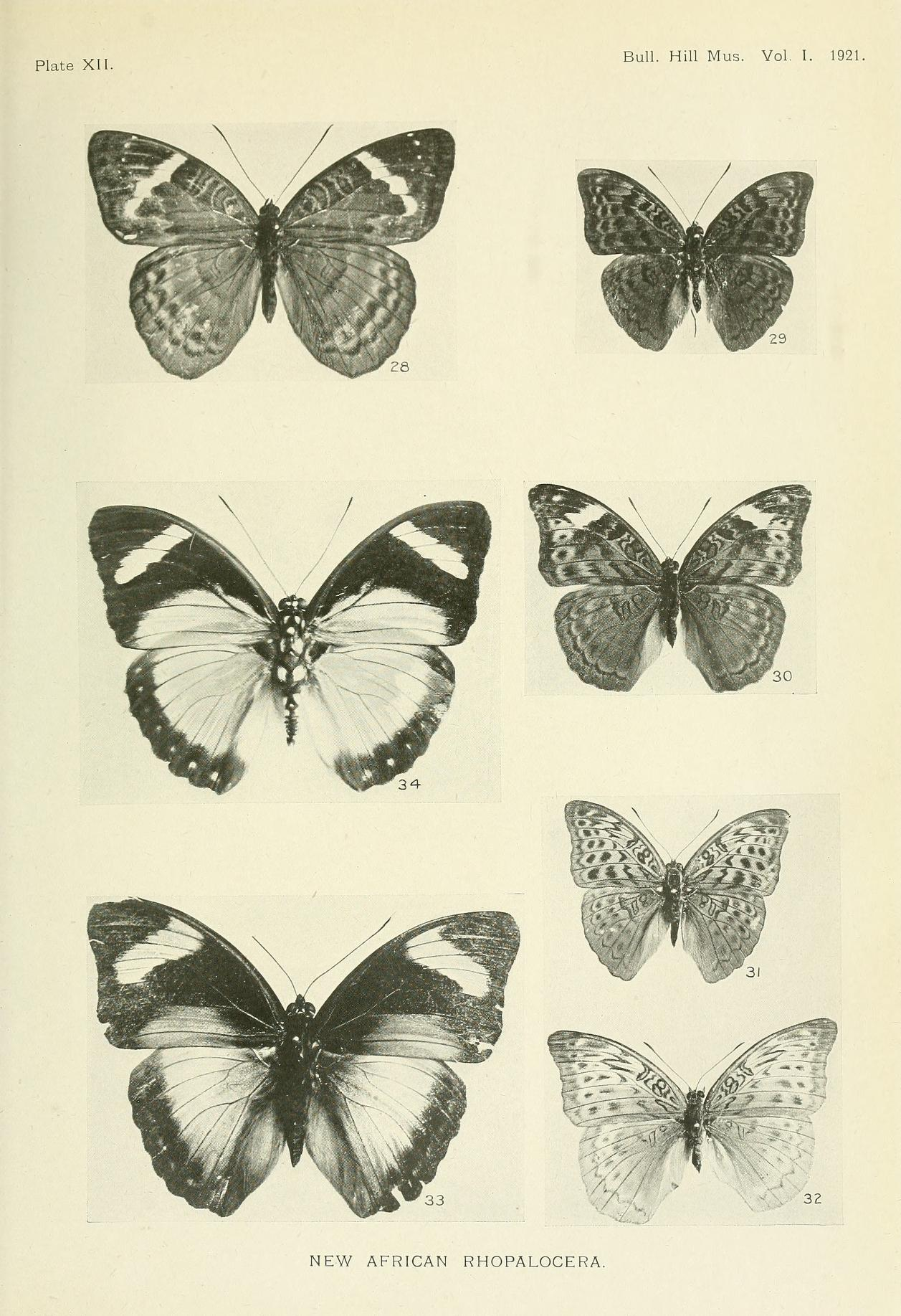
- Plate accompanying the original description, figure 31 (male), figure 32 (female)

Scientific classification
- Kingdom: Animalia
- Phylum: Arthropoda
- Class: Insecta
- Order: Lepidoptera
- Family: Nymphalidae
- Genus: Bebearia
- Species: B. fulgurata

Binomial name
- Bebearia fulgurata (Aurivillius, 1904)

Synonyms
- Euryphene fulgurata Aurivillius, 1904; Euryphene brunnescens Joicey and Talbot, 1921

= Bebearia fulgurata =

Species of butterfly

Bebearia fulgurata is a butterfly in the family Nymphalidae. It is found in the Democratic Republic of the Congo (Mongala, Uele, north Kivu, Tshopo, Kinshasa and Lomami).

Female.The wings are brown above in the basal half and at the distal margin, but between the second band and the sharply angled submarginal line have for the most part a whitish ground-colour, in which are placed the free blackish spots of the third and fourth transverse rows; the under surface is brownish at the base and whitish grey in the distal part; somewhat before the middle a row of whitish, dark-edged spots runs from the hindmargin of the forewing, straight as far as vein 4 and then bent round towards the middle of the costal margin. Lingunda, Congo
