= Bebearia hassoni =

Scientific classification
- Kingdom: Animalia
- Phylum: Arthropoda
- Class: Insecta
- Order: Lepidoptera
- Family: Nymphalidae
- Genus: Bebearia
- Species: B. hassoni

Binomial name
- Bebearia hassoni Hecq, 1998

Species of butterfly

Bebearia hassoni is a butterfly in the family Nymphalidae. It is found in Angola.
