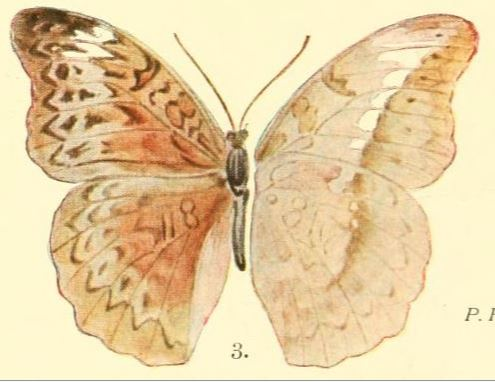

Scientific classification
- Kingdom: Animalia
- Phylum: Arthropoda
- Class: Insecta
- Order: Lepidoptera
- Family: Nymphalidae
- Genus: Bebearia
- Species: B. ducalis

Binomial name
- Bebearia ducalis (Grünberg, 1911)

Synonyms
- Euryphene ducalis Grünberg, 1911

= Bebearia ducalis =

Species of butterfly

Bebearia ducalis is a butterfly in the family Nymphalidae. It is found in the Democratic Republic of the Congo.
