= Bebearia pulchella =

Scientific classification
- Kingdom: Animalia
- Phylum: Arthropoda
- Class: Insecta
- Order: Lepidoptera
- Family: Nymphalidae
- Genus: Bebearia
- Species: B. pulchella

Binomial name
- Bebearia pulchella Hecq, 2006

Species of butterfly

Bebearia pulchella is a butterfly in the family Nymphalidae. It is found in the Central African Republic.
