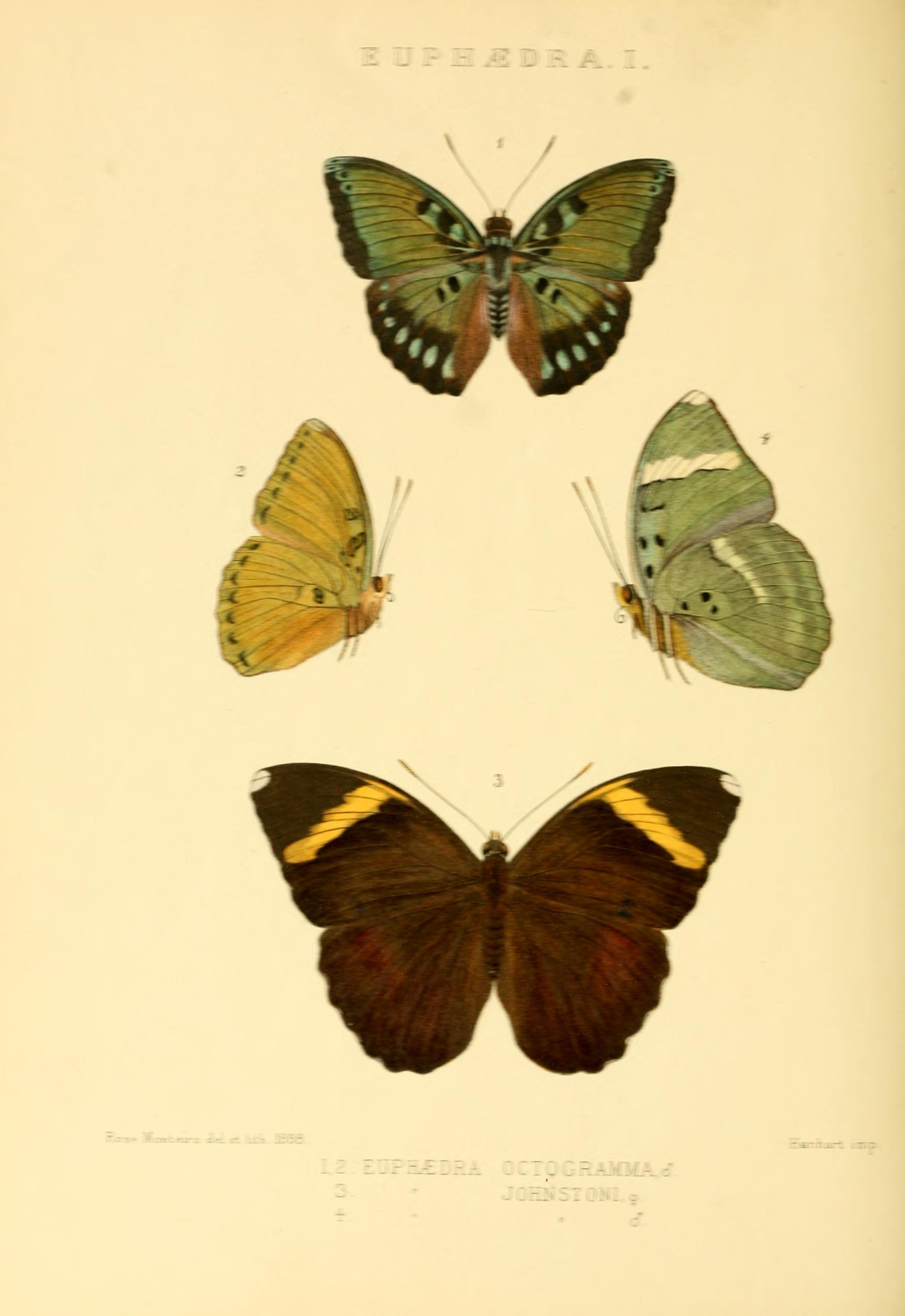
- Bebearia octogramma in Rhopalocera exotica

Scientific classification
- Kingdom: Animalia
- Phylum: Arthropoda
- Class: Insecta
- Order: Lepidoptera
- Family: Nymphalidae
- Genus: Bebearia
- Species: B. octogramma

Binomial name
- Bebearia octogramma (Grose-Smith & Kirby, 1889)

Synonyms
- Euphaedra octogramma Grose-Smith & Kirby, 1889; Bebearia (Bebearia) octogramma; Bebearia octogramme aputida Hecq, 1989

= Bebearia octogramma =

Green-spotted forester

Species of butterfly

Bebearia octogramma, the green-spotted forester, is a butterfly in the family Nymphalidae. It is found in eastern Nigeria, Cameroon, Gabon, the Republic of the Congo and the western part of the Democratic Republic of the Congo. The habitat consists of wet primary forests.

E. octogramnia Sm.& Kirby is a beautiful and easily recognized species, differing from all others in having the broad black marginal band on the upperside of the hindwing ornamented with a row of 7 elongate blue-green submarginal spots. Both wings green above, at the base bluish, with black marginal band, gradually widening posteriorly and at the anal angle of the hindwing about 12 mm. in breadth; the base of the forewing with 5 deep black spots, two in the cell, one at its apex and two oblong ones at the base of cellule lb; the hindwing only with two thick black spots, one in the cell and one at its end; the wings uniform yellow-green beneath with black submarginal streaks and at the base the same spots as above, but small and light- centred, ring-shaped. Cameroons.

Adults feed on fallen fruit.

The larvae feed on an unidentified dicotyledonous tree.
