= Bebearia defluera =

Scientific classification
- Kingdom: Animalia
- Phylum: Arthropoda
- Class: Insecta
- Order: Lepidoptera
- Family: Nymphalidae
- Genus: Bebearia
- Species: B. defluera

Binomial name
- Bebearia defluera Hecq, 1998

Species of butterfly

Bebearia defluera is a butterfly in the family Nymphalidae. It is found in Cameroon and the Democratic Republic of the Congo.
