= Bebearia languida =

Scientific classification
- Kingdom: Animalia
- Phylum: Arthropoda
- Class: Insecta
- Order: Lepidoptera
- Family: Nymphalidae
- Genus: Bebearia
- Species: B. languida

Binomial name
- Bebearia languida (Schultze, 1920)

Synonyms
- Euryphura tentyris var. languida Schultze, 1920; Bebearia (Apectinaria) languida; Bebearis tentyris languida; Bebearia subtentyris languida

Species of butterfly

Bebearia languida is a butterfly in the family Nymphalidae. It is found in Cameroon and the Democratic Republic of the Congo. It was described as a variety of tentyris which it closely resembles.
