= Bebearia liberti =

Scientific classification
- Kingdom: Animalia
- Phylum: Arthropoda
- Class: Insecta
- Order: Lepidoptera
- Family: Nymphalidae
- Genus: Bebearia
- Species: B. liberti

Binomial name
- Bebearia liberti Hecq, 1998

Species of butterfly

Bebearia liberti is a butterfly in the family Nymphalidae. It is found in Cameroon.
