= Bebearia ducarmei =

Scientific classification
- Kingdom: Animalia
- Phylum: Arthropoda
- Class: Insecta
- Order: Lepidoptera
- Family: Nymphalidae
- Genus: Bebearia
- Species: B. ducarmei

Binomial name
- Bebearia ducarmei Hecq, 1987

Species of butterfly

Bebearia ducarmei is a butterfly in the family Nymphalidae. It is found from Cameroon to the Democratic Republic of the Congo.
