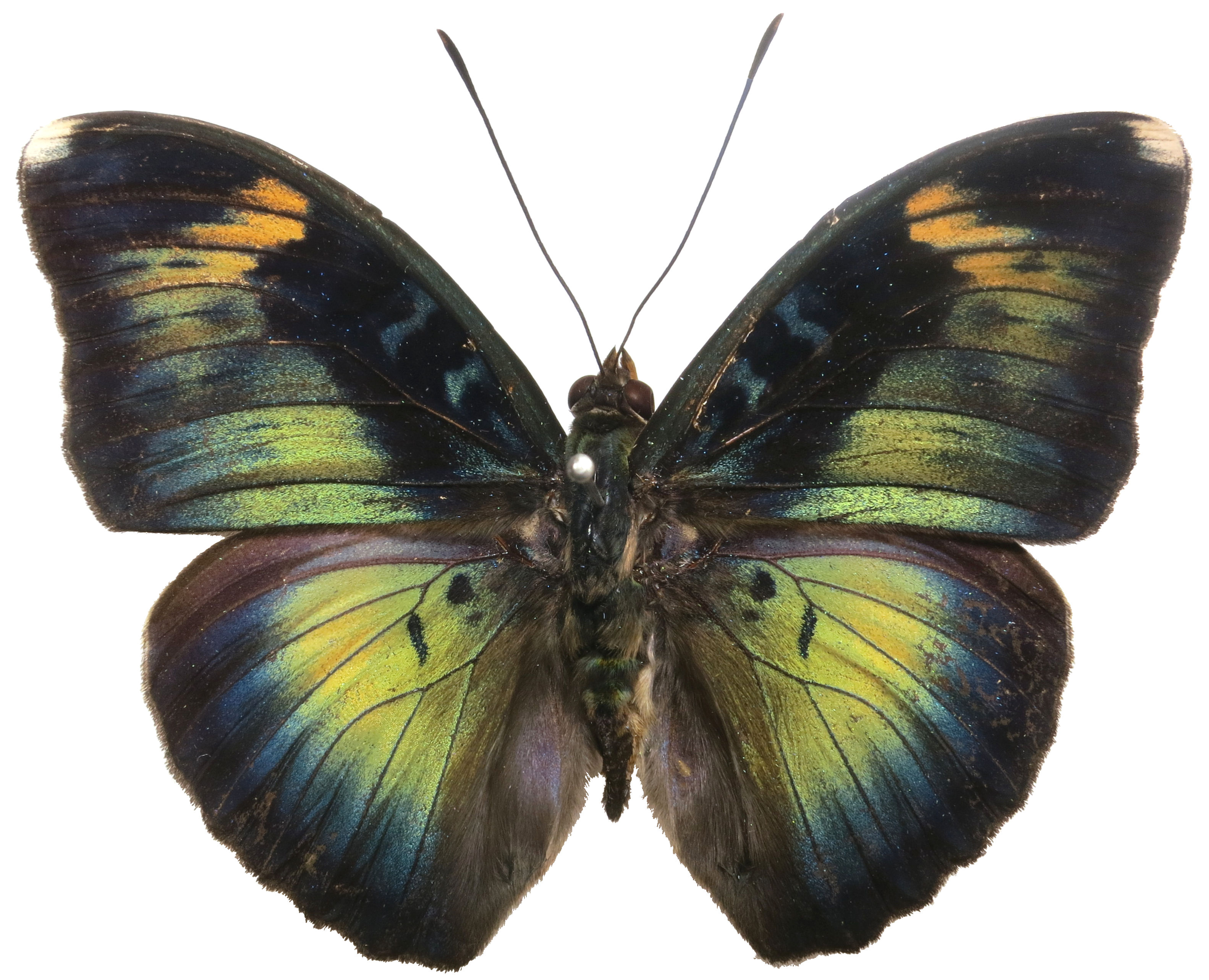
- male - Bibiani, Ghana

Scientific classification
- Kingdom: Animalia
- Phylum: Arthropoda
- Clade: Pancrustacea
- Class: Insecta
- Order: Lepidoptera
- Family: Nymphalidae
- Genus: Bebearia
- Species: B. ashantina

Binomial name
- Bebearia ashantina (Dudgeon, 1913)

Synonyms
- Euryphene ashantina Dudgeon, 1913; Bebearia (Bebearia) ashantina

= Bebearia ashantina =

Species of insect

Bebearia ashantina, the Ashanti forester, is a butterfly in the family Nymphalidae. It is found in Ivory Coast and Ghana. The habitat consists of forests.

Male Forewing black, more or less sprinkled with blue or greenish scales below the costa; cell crossed by two blue or greenish-blue bars followed by an indistinct blue or purplish one beyond the discocellulars : a subapical well defined ochreous bar from vein 7 nearly reaching vein 4, widening below the middle of interspace 5 and bearing a black spot upon it below vein 5; a subtriangular steel-blue or greenish patch having one side extending along the inner margin from one quarter distance from the base to about 3 mm. from the outer margin, and the apex reaching to vein 5 where it is suffused into the subapical ochreous bar; the bases of all the interspaces black; indistinct blackish marks on the blue or greenish area between the veins — an oval one in interspace 3 and strigiform ones in 2 and 6; a suffused blackish border to the outer margin about 3 mm. in width and a quadrate white apical spot. Hindwing with the base and outer margin black, the latter about 3 mm. in width and inwardly suffused with indigo-blue, broadest towards the apex; disc of wing steel-blue or greenish with a whitish or ochreous patch in interspaces 3 — 6 crossed by blue or greenish lines of scales between the veins; cell with two round black spots in the middle, the upper the larger, and a divided black mark on the upper part of the discocellulars.

Female Forewing with the blue bars in the cell indistinct; subapical dark ochreous band extending- from vein 7 to near the middle of interspace 2, angled outwardly at vein 5 and bearing blackish streaks upon it between the veins in the middle of interspaces 3 and 4; triangular patch on the middle of the inner margin blue, or greenish-blue, reaching to middle of interspace 2, and leaving- a larger black area at the bases of the interspaces and a broader black outer marginal band than in the male. Hindwing blue, or greenish-blue, with a broad black or indigo marginal band; a large pale blue or pale yellow patch upon the disc beyond the cell from vein 3 to above vein 7; two rounded black spots in the middle of the cell and a divided black mark on the discocellulars. Underside of both sexes greenish, suffused with dusky scales on the outer areas; the subapical and discal areas appearing as ochreous suffusions; cell of the forewing with a subbasal dark spot followed by two black ring marks placed one above the other, and an irregularly shaped ring spot on the discocellulars; hindwing with two dark ring spots in the middle of the cell and a divided dark mark on the discocellulars.

Both sexes may have the colour scales on the upper side steely-blue or greenish, but when the latter is found, it is never of the yellow or golden green tint of the allied species.

Expanse male, 74 mm. female, 90 mm.

Habitat : Ashanti; Gold Coast. The types are in coll.Dudgeon, but co-types are being presented to the British Museum collection. " Honeyden," North Cray, Kent July 29, 1913.

Adults are attracted to fallen fruit.

Torben Larsen developed a species numbering system for his 2005 publication Butterflies of West Africa. This species is #1035. The 'Larsen' numbers have since been used with permission in A Sharp Eye on Butterflies of Ghana.
