= Bebearia occitana =

Scientific classification
- Kingdom: Animalia
- Phylum: Arthropoda
- Class: Insecta
- Order: Lepidoptera
- Family: Nymphalidae
- Genus: Bebearia
- Species: B. occitana

Binomial name
- Bebearia occitana Hecq, 1989

Synonyms
- Bebearia laetitioides occitana Hecq, 1989; Bebearia (Bebearia) occitana

Species of butterfly

Bebearia occitana, the Occitana forester, is a butterfly in the family Nymphalidae. It is found in eastern Nigeria and western Cameroon. The habitat consists of undisturbed wet forests.
