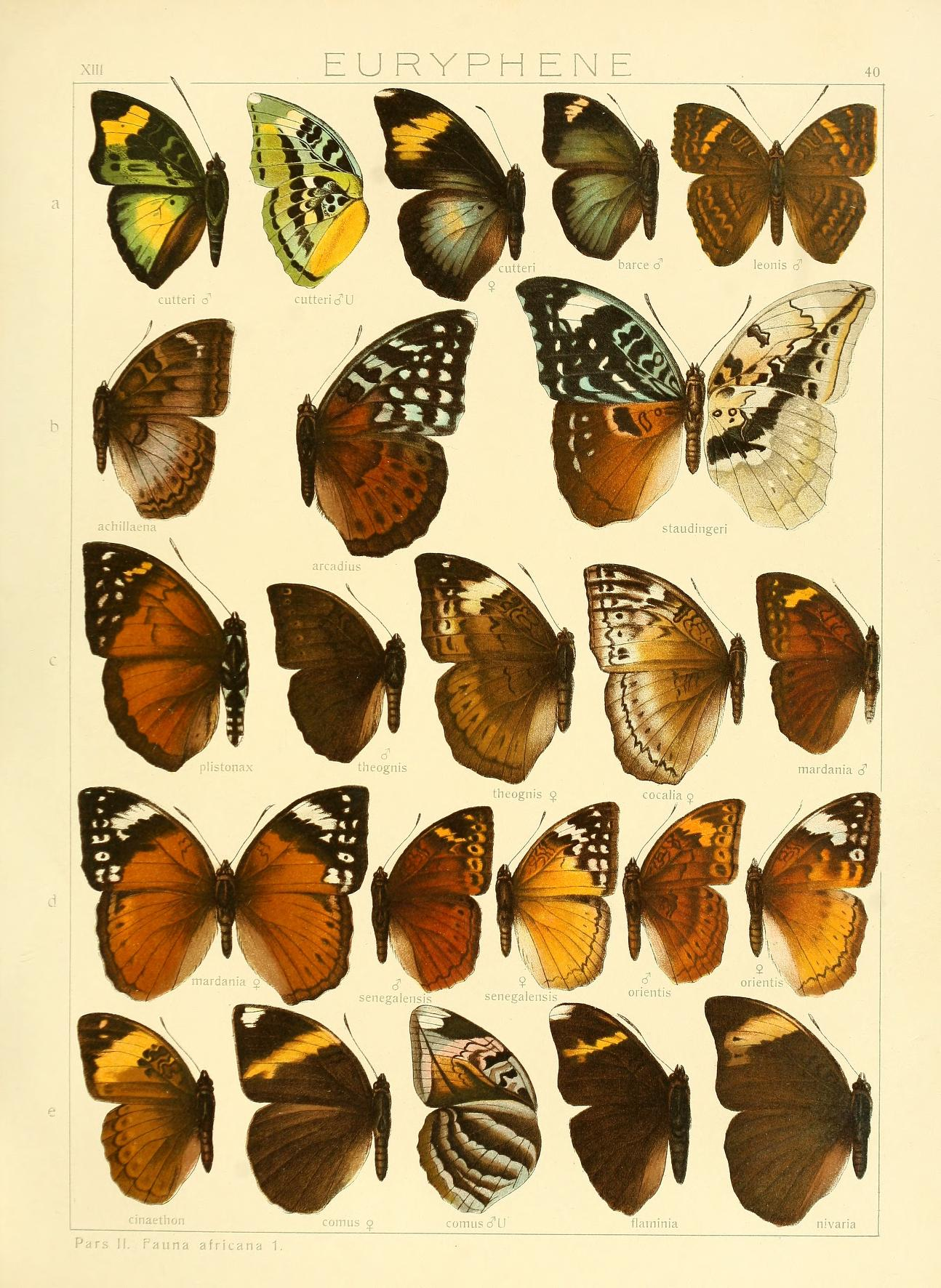
- In Adalbert Seitz's Fauna Africana

Scientific classification
- Kingdom: Animalia
- Phylum: Arthropoda
- Clade: Pancrustacea
- Class: Insecta
- Order: Lepidoptera
- Family: Nymphalidae
- Genus: Bebearia
- Species: B. arcadius

Binomial name
- Bebearia arcadius (Fabricius, 1793)

Synonyms
- Papilio arcadius Fabricius, 1793; Bebearia (Apectinaria) arcadius; Nymphalis siva Godart, 1824

= Bebearia arcadius =

Arcadian

Species of butterfly

Bebearia arcadius, the Arcadian, is a butterfly in the family Nymphalidae. It is found in Guinea, Sierra Leone, Liberia, Ivory Coast and Ghana. The habitat consists of wetter forests.

E. arcadius F. (40 b). The hindwing and the basal one-fourth of the forewing are very dark chestnut-brown above, with indistinct markings; the cell and the base of cellules (2) 3—6 are bluish green, the former with two black transverse lines; the entire distal part on the contrary is black with three transverse rows of large white spots, suffused with greenish; a greenish transverse streak is usually present also in cellule 7 of the hindwing. The under surface agrees almost entirely with that of plistonax. Sierra Leone to Gold Coast.

Adults are attracted to fallen fruit.

Torben Larsen developed a species numbering system for his 2005 publication Butterflies of West Africa. This species is #1017. The 'Larsen' numbers have since been used with permission in A Sharp Eye on Butterflies of Ghana.
