= Bebearia oremansi =

Scientific classification
- Kingdom: Animalia
- Phylum: Arthropoda
- Class: Insecta
- Order: Lepidoptera
- Family: Nymphalidae
- Genus: Bebearia
- Species: B. oremansi

Binomial name
- Bebearia oremansi Hecq, 1994

Synonyms
- Bebearia eremita Hecq, 2006

Species of butterfly

Bebearia oremansi is a butterfly in the family Nymphalidae. It is found in Gabon and Equatorial Guinea.
