= Bebearia cocalioides =

Scientific classification
- Kingdom: Animalia
- Phylum: Arthropoda
- Clade: Pancrustacea
- Class: Insecta
- Order: Lepidoptera
- Family: Nymphalidae
- Genus: Bebearia
- Species: B. cocalioides

Binomial name
- Bebearia cocalioides Hecq, 1988

Synonyms
- Bebearia mardania cocalioides Hecq, 1988; Bebearia (Apectinaria) cocalioides

Species of butterfly

Bebearia cocalioides, the large palm forester, is a butterfly in the family Nymphalidae. It is found in Nigeria, Cameroon, the Republic of the Congo, the Central African Republic and the Democratic Republic of the Congo. The habitat consists of forests.

== Subspecies ==
- Bebearia cocalioides cocalioides (Congo, Central African Republic, western Democratic Republic of the Congo)
- Bebearia cocalioides hecqi Holmes, 2001 (Nigeria: Cross River loop, Cameroon)
