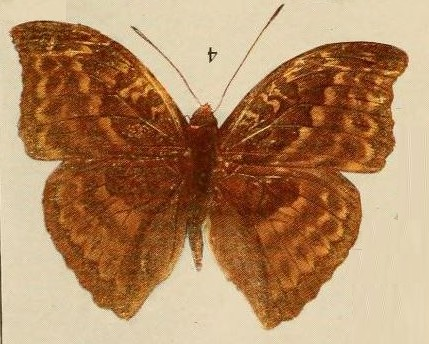

Scientific classification
- Kingdom: Animalia
- Phylum: Arthropoda
- Class: Insecta
- Order: Lepidoptera
- Family: Nymphalidae
- Genus: Bebearia
- Species: B. cottoni

Binomial name
- Bebearia cottoni (Bethune-Baker, 1908)

Synonyms
- Euryphene cottoni Bethune-Baker, 1908; Bebearia lucasi Holland, 1920

= Bebearia cottoni =

Species of butterfly

Bebearia cottoni is a butterfly in the family Nymphalidae. It is found in the Democratic Republic of the Congo (the central basin).

it is described as follows: Male. Both wings with alternate black-brown and tawny transverse stripes and rows of spots; forewing with three spots in the cell and one behind its apex, which is confluent with an oblique transverse row of black spots, then follows a broad transverse band, interrupted at the veins and at vein 6 angled to the costal margin; outside this band the forewing is black-brown with large black submarginal spots surrounded with tawny; hindwing with darkened basal area and broad median tawny band, followed by a broad curved dark band tapering towards the inner margin; a postmedian curved row of large black spots broadly surrounded with tawny; a broad, sharply defined, black, scalloped submarginal line; beneath both wings are light ochreous brown with indications of the markings of the upper surface. In the female both wings are paler brown above with dusky ochreous markings; the forewing with clear pale ochreous subapical band and the hindwing with broad, indefinite, median band of the same colour. 60—74 mm. Congo region, at Makala and Beni Mawambe.
