= Bebearia improvisa =

Scientific classification
- Kingdom: Animalia
- Phylum: Arthropoda
- Class: Insecta
- Order: Lepidoptera
- Family: Nymphalidae
- Genus: Bebearia
- Species: B. improvisa

Binomial name
- Bebearia improvisa Hecq, 2000

Species of butterfly

Bebearia improvisa is a butterfly in the family Nymphalidae. It is found in the Democratic Republic of the Congo.
