= Bebearia lopeensis =

Scientific classification
- Kingdom: Animalia
- Phylum: Arthropoda
- Class: Insecta
- Order: Lepidoptera
- Family: Nymphalidae
- Genus: Bebearia
- Species: B. lopeensis

Binomial name
- Bebearia lopeensis van de Weghe, 2007

Species of butterfly

Bebearia lopeensis is a butterfly in the family Nymphalidae. It is found in Gabon.
