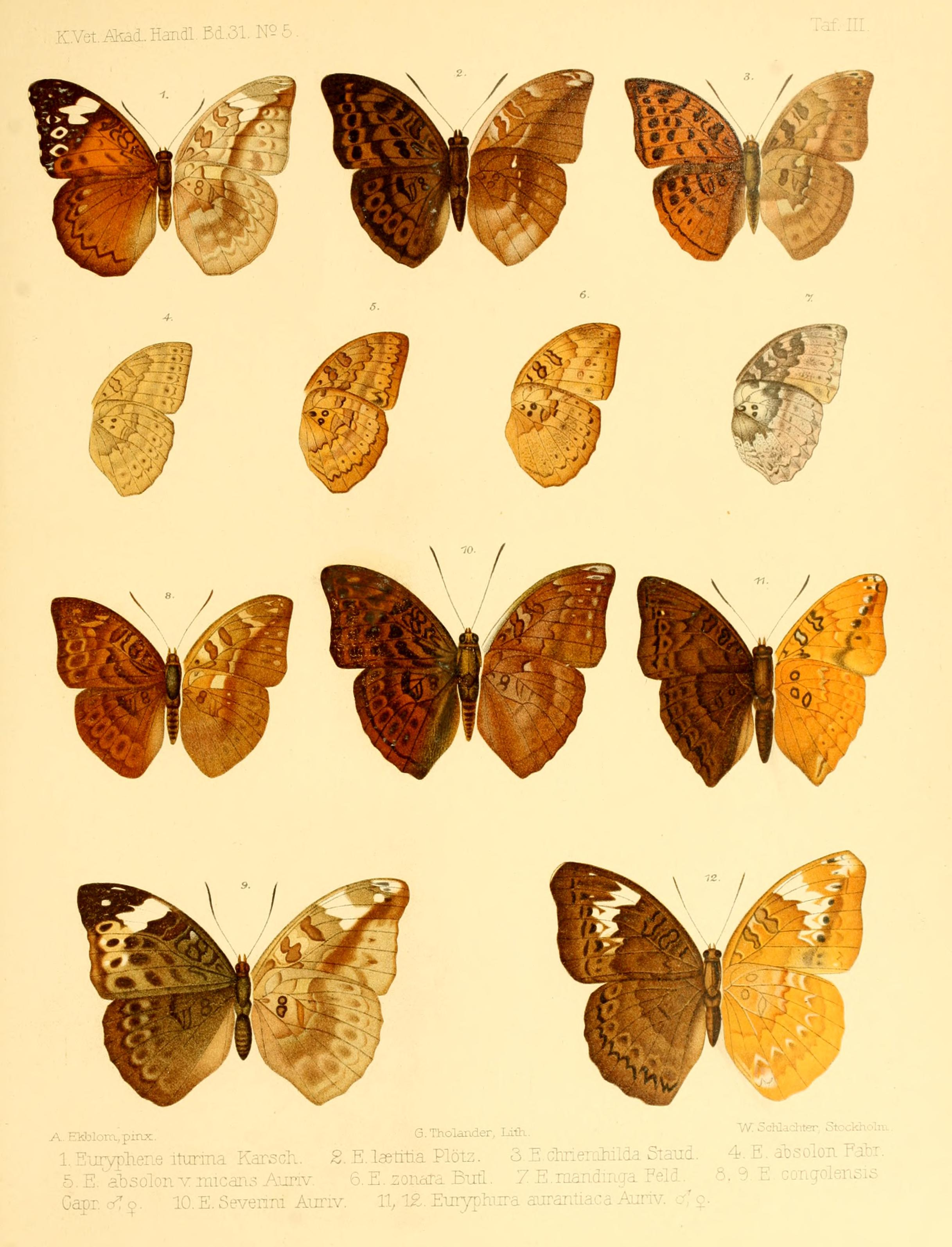
- in Rhopalocera Aethiopica Aurivillius, 1899

Scientific classification
- Kingdom: Animalia
- Phylum: Arthropoda
- Class: Insecta
- Order: Lepidoptera
- Family: Nymphalidae
- Genus: Bebearia
- Species: B. severini

Binomial name
- Bebearia severini (Aurivillius, 1897)

Synonyms
- Euryphene severini Aurivillius, 1897; Bebearia (Bebearia) severini

= Bebearia severini =

Species of butterfly

Bebearia severini is a butterfly in the family Nymphalidae. It is found from Cameroon to the Democratic Republic of the Congo (Ubangi, Mongala, Uele, northern Kivu, Tshopo and Sankuru).

E. severini Auriv. is so near to the following species [Bebearia laetitia] that it is sufficient to mention the differences. The male only differs above in the somewhat reddish yellow-brown ground-colour, beneath in the dark red-brown ground-colour, somewhat inclining to violet; the underside of the hindwing is entirely without the violet-grey colour at the anal angle which is so distinct in Bebearia sophus and laetitia, as well as the white transverse streak in cellule 7. The female closely resembles that of laetitia, but differs somewhat on the under surface, which is not yellowish and recalls that of the male in having a slight violet tinge; the black submarginal line of the hindwing is much more sharply dentate or undulate than in laetitia. Bena-Bendi, Congo.
