= Bebearia maledicta =

Maligned forester

Scientific classification
- Kingdom: Animalia
- Phylum: Arthropoda
- Class: Insecta
- Order: Lepidoptera
- Family: Nymphalidae
- Genus: Bebearia
- Species: B. maledicta

Binomial name
- Bebearia maledicta (Strand, 1912)

Synonyms
- Euryphene maledicta Strand, 1912; Bebearia (Bebearia) maledicta; Najas [Euphaedra] condamini Fox, 1968

Species of butterfly

Bebearia maledicta, the maligned forester, is a butterfly in the family Nymphalidae. It is found in Sierra Leone, Liberia, Ivory Coast, Ghana, western Nigeria, Cameroon and the Republic of the Congo. The habitat consists of forests.
