= Bebearia equatorialis =

Scientific classification
- Kingdom: Animalia
- Phylum: Arthropoda
- Clade: Pancrustacea
- Class: Insecta
- Order: Lepidoptera
- Family: Nymphalidae
- Genus: Bebearia
- Species: B. equatorialis

Binomial name
- Bebearia equatorialis Hecq, 1989

Synonyms
- Bebearia ashantina equatorialis Hecq, 1989; Bebearia (Bebearia) equatorialis

Species of butterfly

Bebearia equatorialis, the equatorial forester, is a butterfly in the family Nymphalidae, which lives in the northwestern forests of the Democratic Republic of the Congo.
