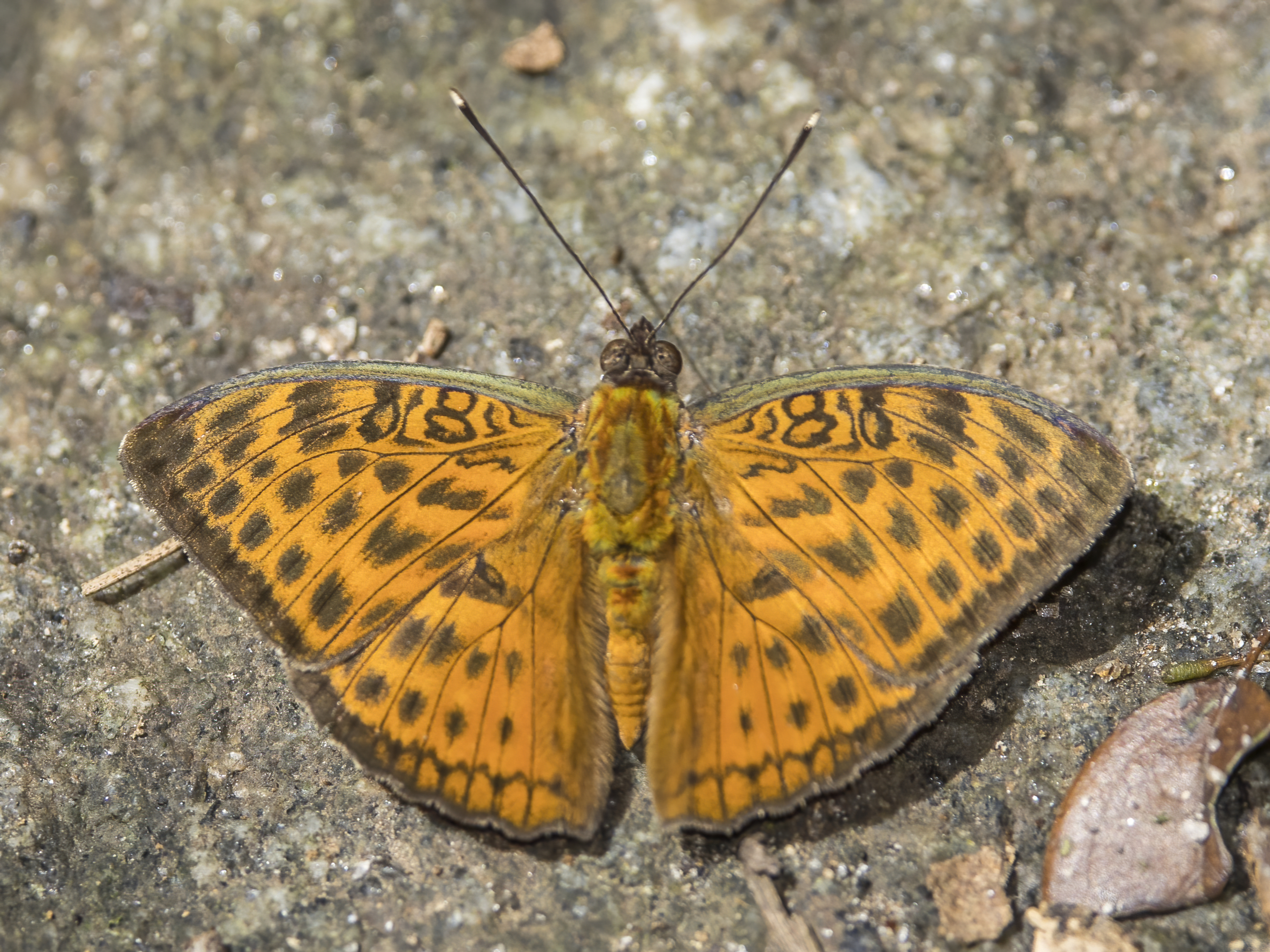

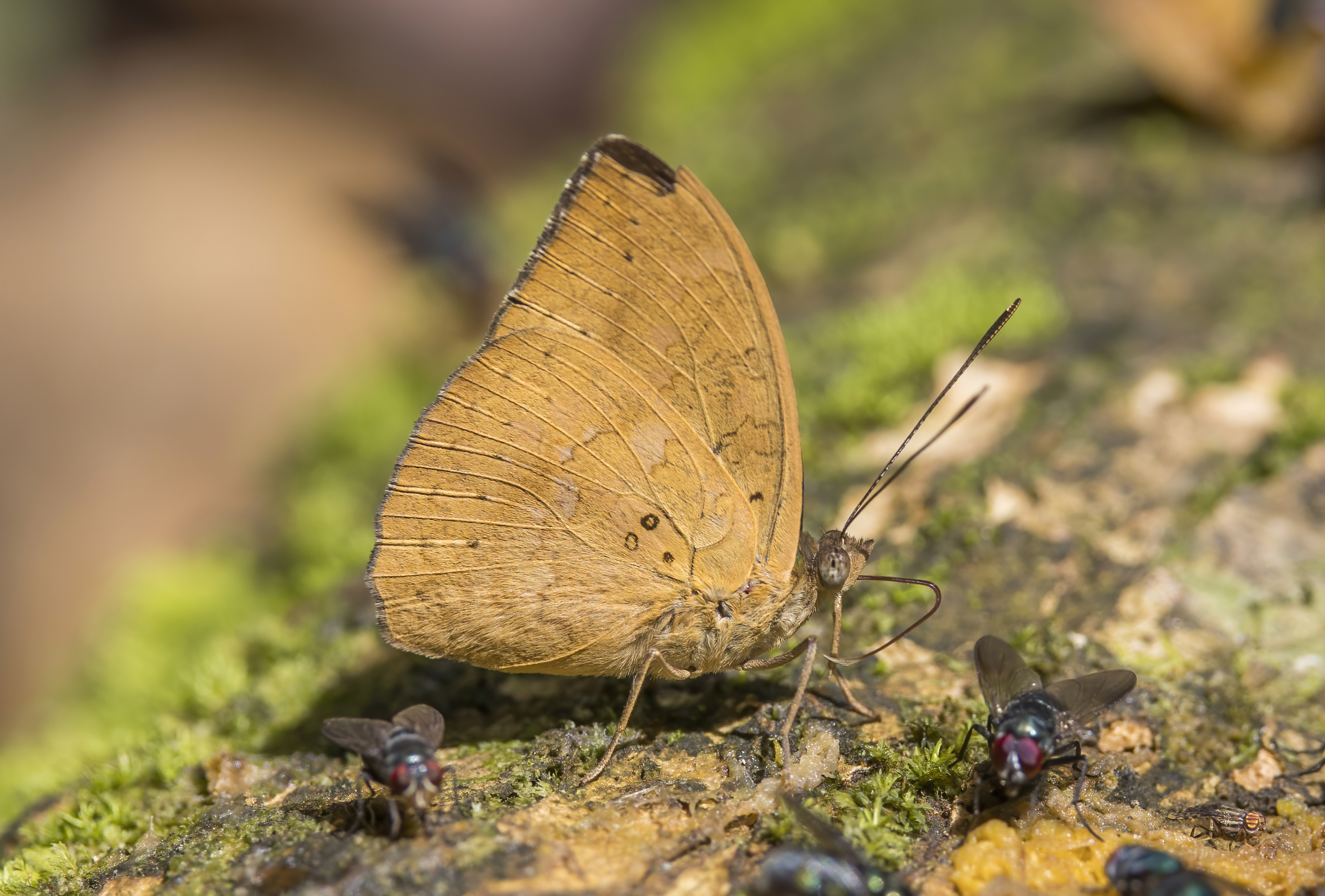
- Both in Ghana

Scientific classification
- Kingdom: Animalia
- Phylum: Arthropoda
- Clade: Pancrustacea
- Class: Insecta
- Order: Lepidoptera
- Family: Nymphalidae
- Genus: Bebearia
- Species: B. lucayensis

Binomial name
- Bebearia lucayensis Hecq, 1996

Synonyms
- Euryphura tentyris ab. lucayensis Schultze, 1920; Bebearia (Apectinaria) lucayensis; Bebearia subtentyris lucayensis

= Bebearia lucayensis =

Species of butterfly

Bebearia lucayensis, the plain forester, is a butterfly in the family Nymphalidae. It is found in Ivory Coast, Ghana, Nigeria, Cameroon, the Republic of the Congo and the Democratic Republic of the Congo. The habitat consists of forests.

The larvae feed on Hypselodelphys and Marantochloa species.

Torben Larsen developed a species numbering system for his 2005 publication Butterflies of West Africa. This species is #994. The 'Larsen' numbers have since been used with permission in A Sharp Eye on Butterflies of Ghana.
