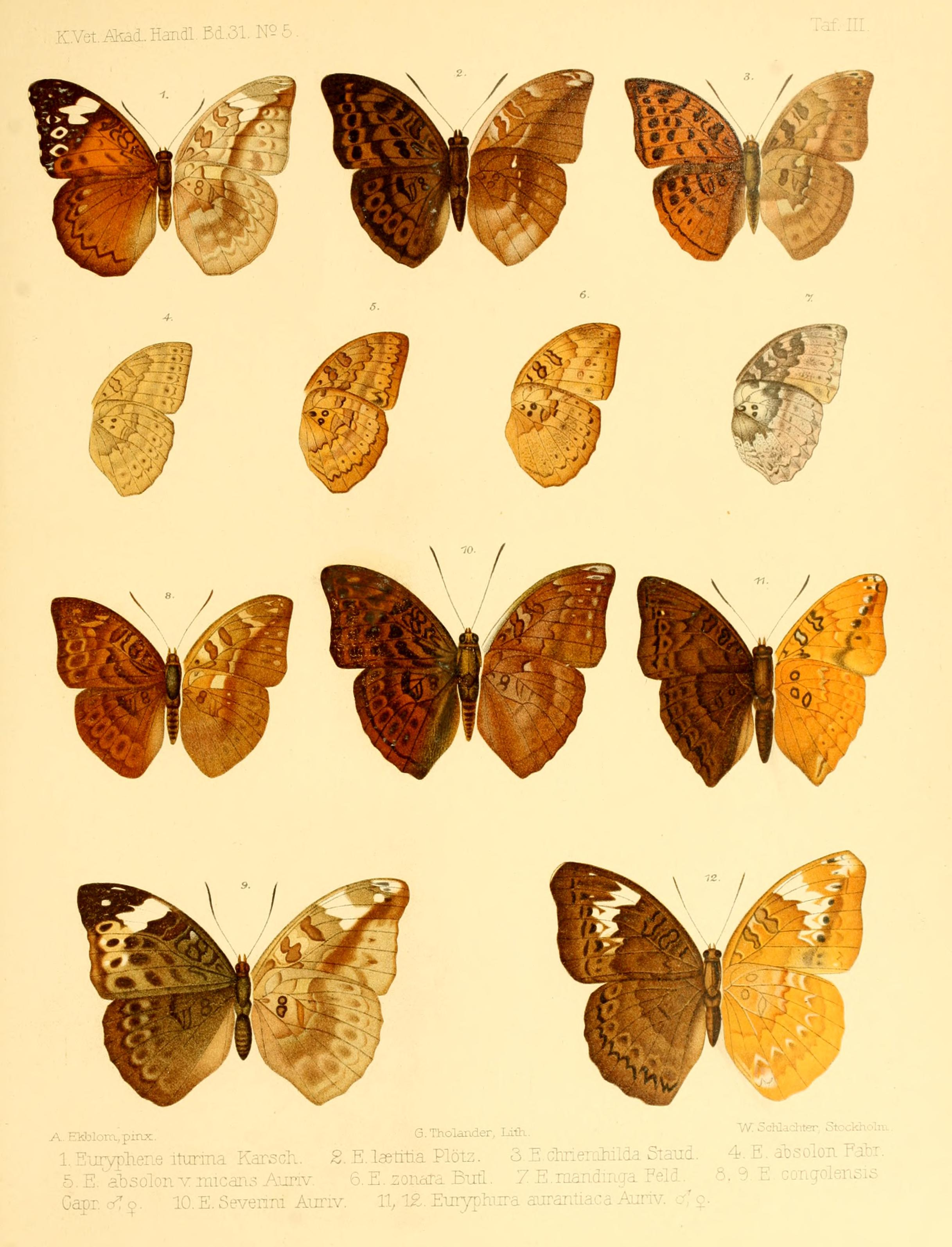
- Euryphene absolon var. micans Aurivillius, 1899 in Rhopalocera Aethiopica figure 5

Scientific classification
- Kingdom: Animalia
- Phylum: Arthropoda
- Class: Insecta
- Order: Lepidoptera
- Family: Nymphalidae
- Genus: Bebearia
- Species: B. micans

Binomial name
- Bebearia micans (Aurivillius, 1899)

Synonyms
- Euryphene absolon var. micans Aurivillius, 1899; Bebearia (Apectinaria) micans

= Bebearia micans =

Species of butterfly

Bebearia micans, the shimmering forester, is a butterfly in the family Nymphalidae. It is found in Nigeria, Cameroon, Gabon, the Republic of the Congo, the Central African Republic and the Democratic Republic of the Congo.

The larvae feed on Haumannia danckelmanniana.
