= Bebearia raeveli =

Scientific classification
- Kingdom: Animalia
- Phylum: Arthropoda
- Class: Insecta
- Order: Lepidoptera
- Family: Nymphalidae
- Genus: Bebearia
- Species: B. raeveli

Binomial name
- Bebearia raeveli Hecq, 1989

Species of butterfly

Bebearia raeveli is a butterfly in the family Nymphalidae. It is found in the Central African Republic and south-eastern Cameroon.
