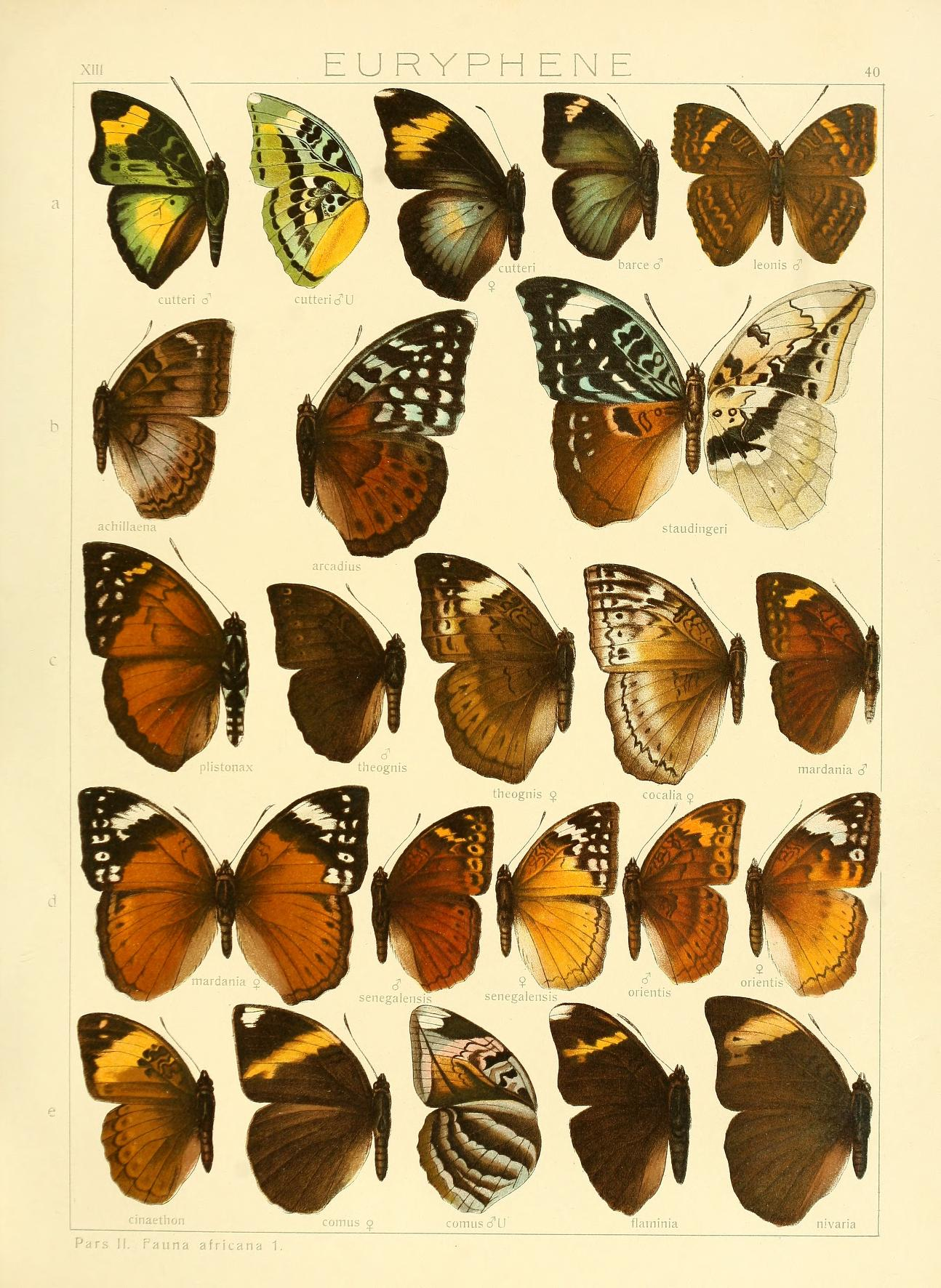
- In Adalbert Seitz's Fauna Africana b

Scientific classification
- Kingdom: Animalia
- Phylum: Arthropoda
- Clade: Pancrustacea
- Class: Insecta
- Order: Lepidoptera
- Family: Nymphalidae
- Genus: Bebearia
- Species: B. staudingeri

Binomial name
- Bebearia staudingeri (Aurivillius, 1893)

Synonyms
- Euryphene staudingeri Aurivillius, 1893; Bebearia (Apectinaria) staudingeri

= Bebearia staudingeri =

Species of butterfly

Bebearia staudingeri, or Staudinger's forester, is a butterfly in the family Nymphalidae. It is found in Nigeria, Cameroon, Gabon, the Republic of the Congo, the Central African Republic and the Democratic Republic of the Congo (Equateur, Tshuapa and Sankuru). The habitat consists of forests.

E. staudingeri Auriv. (40 b) is the largest and also one of the most beautiful species of Euryphene. Beneath the male agrees entirely with the female, which we figure here, but on the upperside it differs in having both wings brown, the spots of the forewing yellow and the subapical band of the forewing smaller and yellow; the hindwing is almost unicolorous, the dark markings being very indistinct. In the female the forewing is deep black above with broad white subapical band, greenish white spots in the transverse rows and green transverse lines in the cell; the under surface is a delicate greenish grey with sharply prominent black-brown markings, the arrangement of which is best seen from the figure (40b). Cameroons and Gabon.

Adults are attracted to fermenting fruit.
