= Bebearia fontainei =

Scientific classification
- Kingdom: Animalia
- Phylum: Arthropoda
- Class: Insecta
- Order: Lepidoptera
- Family: Nymphalidae
- Genus: Bebearia
- Species: B. fontainei

Binomial name
- Bebearia fontainei Berger, 1981

Species of butterfly

Bebearia fontainei is a butterfly in the family Nymphalidae. It is found in Sankuru in the Democratic Republic of the Congo.
