= Bebearia inepta =

Scientific classification
- Kingdom: Animalia
- Phylum: Arthropoda
- Class: Insecta
- Order: Lepidoptera
- Family: Nymphalidae
- Genus: Bebearia
- Species: B. inepta

Binomial name
- Bebearia inepta Hecq, 2001

Synonyms
- Bebearia (Bebearia) inepta

Species of butterfly

Bebearia inepta, or Plowes' forester, is a butterfly in the family Nymphalidae. It is found in Ivory Coast. The habitat consists of forests.
