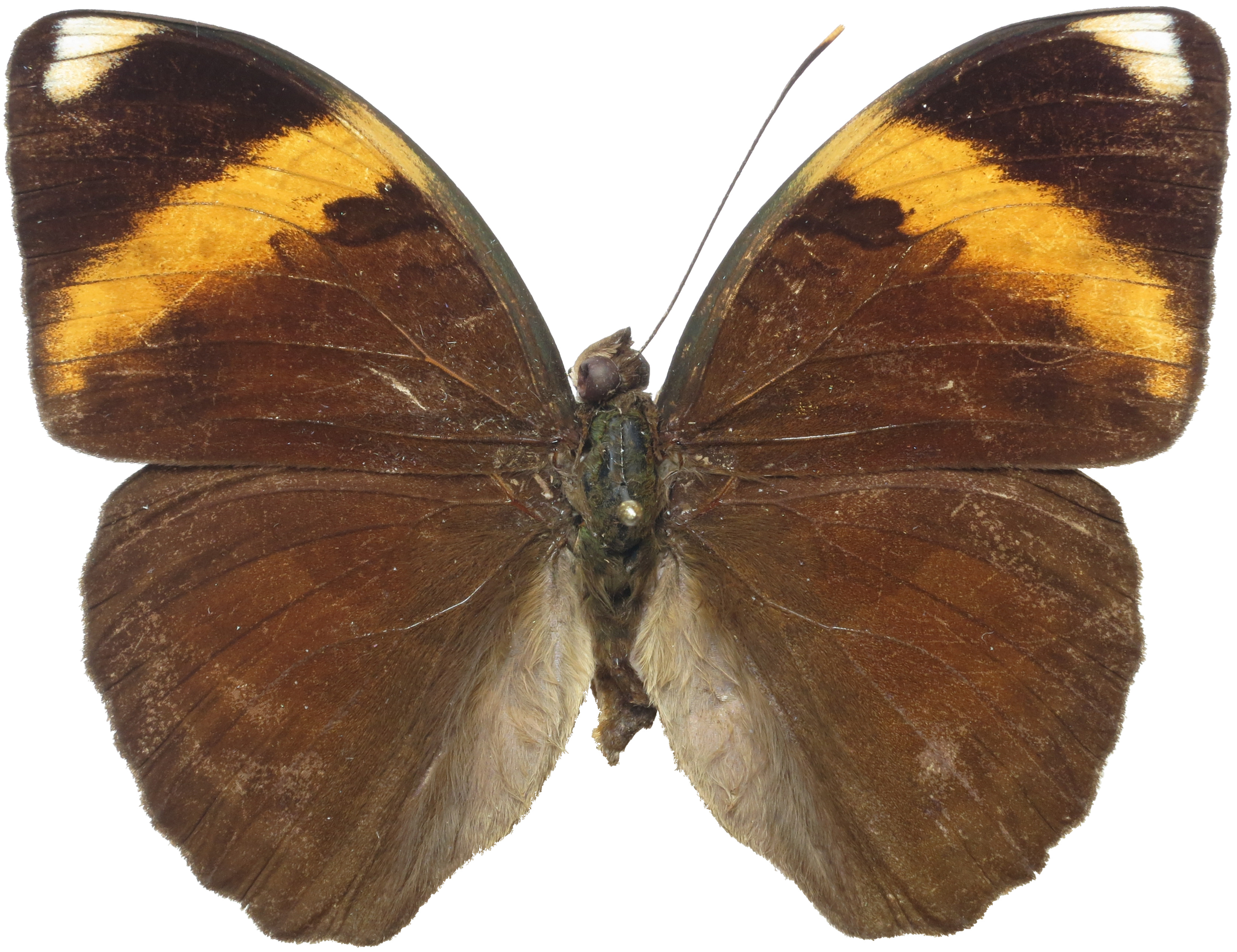
- Male from Mabalmayo, Cameroon

Scientific classification
- Kingdom: Animalia
- Phylum: Arthropoda
- Class: Insecta
- Order: Lepidoptera
- Family: Nymphalidae
- Genus: Bebearia
- Species: B. comus

Binomial name
- Bebearia comus (Ward, 1871)

Synonyms
- Euryphene comus Ward, 1871; Bebearia (Apectinaria) comus

= Bebearia comus =

Broad-banded forester

Species of butterfly

Bebearia comus, the broad-banded forester, is a butterfly in the family Nymphalidae. It is found in Nigeria and Cameroon and from Equatorial Guinea to the Democratic Republic of the Congo. The habitat consists of forests.

E. comus Ward (40 e) has the ground-colour of the upperside uniform dark velvety brown and only in the cell of the forewing and at the proximal side of the oblique band some indistinct black lines. The forewing is dark brown beneath, in the middle more or less yellowish with violet-grey transverse spots in the cell and at the costal margin and a whitish apical spot; the underside of the hindwing has besides the median band 4 or 5 dark transverse bands, all broadly margined with violet-grey. The light spots just before the apex of the forewing are in the male tinged with yellowish above, in the female pure white. Cameroons to the Congo.

The larvae feed on Calamus and Eremospatha species.

== Subspecies ==
- Bebearia comus comus — eastern Nigeria, Cameroon, Equatorial Guinea, Democratic Republic of the Congo: Uele, Tshopo, Equateur, Cataractes, Kasai and Sankuru
- Bebearia comus retracta Hecq, 1989 — Democratic Republic of Congo: Kivu
