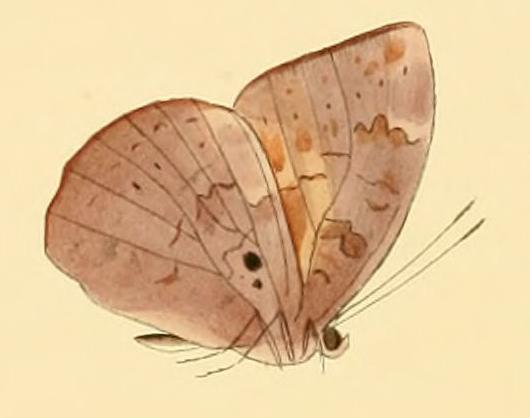

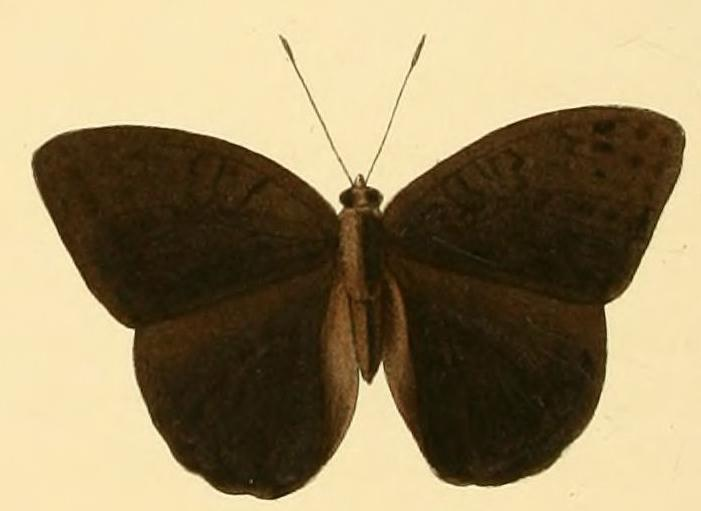

Scientific classification
- Kingdom: Animalia
- Phylum: Arthropoda
- Clade: Pancrustacea
- Class: Insecta
- Order: Lepidoptera
- Family: Nymphalidae
- Genus: Bebearia
- Species: B. abesa

Binomial name
- Bebearia abesa (Hewitson, 1869)

Synonyms
- Aterica abesa Hewitson, 1869; Bebearia (Apectinaria) abesa; Euryphene cercestis Ward, 1871; Bebearia banksi Hecq & Larsen, 1998

= Bebearia abesa =

Species of butterfly

Bebearia abesa, the black forester, is a butterfly in the family Nymphalidae. It is found in Sierra Leone, Liberia, Ivory Coast, Ghana, Nigeria, Cameroon, Gabon, the Republic of the Congo, the Democratic Republic of the Congo and Uganda.

E. abesa Hew. (41 d, e) differs from all the other species of this group in the underside of the hindwing having three deep black dots in the cell instead of a dot and two rings. In the male the wings are very dark velvety black-brown above; on this dark ground-colour the black transverse markings only show indistinctly. The female has the transverse rows of spots on the forewing complete and the yellow median band on the hindwing at least 10 mm. in breadth in cellules 5 and 6. Gold Coast to the northern Congo.

== Subspecies ==
- Bebearia abesa abesa (Sierra Leone, Liberia, Ivory Coast, Ghana, Nigeria, Cameroon, Gabon, Congo, Democratic Republic of the Congo: Mayumbe, Ubangi, Mongala, Tshopo, Tshuapa, Sankuru)
- Bebearia abesa pandera Hecq, 1988 (western Uganda, Democratic Republic of the Congo: Uele)

Torben Larsen developed a species numbering system for his 2005 publication Butterflies of West Africa. The nominate subspecies is #1004. The 'Larsen' numbers have since been used with permission in A Sharp Eye on Butterflies of Ghana.
