= Bebearia kiellandi =

Scientific classification
- Kingdom: Animalia
- Phylum: Arthropoda
- Class: Insecta
- Order: Lepidoptera
- Family: Nymphalidae
- Genus: Bebearia
- Species: B. kiellandi

Binomial name
- Bebearia kiellandi Hecq, 1993

Species of butterfly

Bebearia kiellandi is a butterfly in the family Nymphalidae. It is found in north-western Tanzania. The habitat consists of forests.

Adults are attracted to fermenting bananas.
