= Bebearia ivindoensis =

Scientific classification
- Kingdom: Animalia
- Phylum: Arthropoda
- Class: Insecta
- Order: Lepidoptera
- Family: Nymphalidae
- Genus: Bebearia
- Species: B. ivindoensis

Binomial name
- Bebearia ivindoensis van de Weghe, 2007

Species of butterfly

Bebearia ivindoensis is a butterfly in the family Nymphalidae. It is found in Gabon.
