= Bebearia leptotypa =

Scientific classification
- Kingdom: Animalia
- Phylum: Arthropoda
- Class: Insecta
- Order: Lepidoptera
- Family: Nymphalidae
- Genus: Bebearia
- Species: B. leptotypa

Binomial name
- Bebearia leptotypa (Bethune-Baker, 1908)

Synonyms
- Euryphene leptotypa Bethune-Baker, 1908; Bebearia (Bebearia) leptotypa; Bebearia phantasia leptotypa; Euryphene phantasia f. paraceres Talbot, 1928; Euryphene phantasia f. kamitugensis Dufrane, 1945; Euryphene phantasia paraceres d’Abrera, 1980

Species of butterfly

Bebearia leptotypa is a butterfly in the family Nymphalidae. It is found in the Democratic Republic of the Congo (Uele, north Kivu, Equateur, Kinshasa and Sankuru).

E. leptotypa Baker has both wings black above with pale steel-blue suffusion; the suffusion on the forewing is confined to the posterior part and anteriorly bounded by vein 3, not extending to the base nor the distal margin; the subapical band is white, reaches vein 5 and is accompanied in cellule 4 by a bluish white spot which extends nearly to the distal margin; the apex with small white patch; the hindwing is blue with a broad marginal band of uniform breadth. The under surface is uniform light bronzy green; the forewing with the markings of the upperside indistinct; the hindwing with a whitish angled dash in cellule 7 and with an indistinct dark submarginal line and postmedian band. Expanse 86 mm. Congo region, at Beni-Mawambe.
