= Bebearia omo =

Scientific classification
- Kingdom: Animalia
- Phylum: Arthropoda
- Class: Insecta
- Order: Lepidoptera
- Family: Nymphalidae
- Genus: Bebearia
- Species: B. omo

Binomial name
- Bebearia omo Larsen & Warren, 2005

Synonyms
- Bebearia (Bebearia) omo

Species of butterfly

Bebearia omo, the Omo forester, is a butterfly in the family Nymphalidae. It is found in western Nigeria and Cameroon. The habitat consists of tropical rainforest in good condition.

Adults have been observed on the fallen fruit of umbrella trees (Musanga cecropioides).
