= Bebearia allardi =

Scientific classification
- Kingdom: Animalia
- Phylum: Arthropoda
- Clade: Pancrustacea
- Class: Insecta
- Order: Lepidoptera
- Family: Nymphalidae
- Genus: Bebearia
- Species: B. allardi

Binomial name
- Bebearia allardi Hecq, 1989

Species of butterfly

Bebearia allardi is a butterfly in the family Nymphalidae. It is found in the central basin of the Democratic Republic of the Congo.
