= Bebearia hargreavesi =

Scientific classification
- Kingdom: Animalia
- Phylum: Arthropoda
- Class: Insecta
- Order: Lepidoptera
- Family: Nymphalidae
- Genus: Bebearia
- Species: B. hargreavesi

Binomial name
- Bebearia hargreavesi d'Abrera, 1980

Species of butterfly

Bebearia hargreavesi is a butterfly in the family Nymphalidae. It is found in Kivu in the Democratic Republic of the Congo.
