= Bebearia schoutedeni =

Scientific classification
- Kingdom: Animalia
- Phylum: Arthropoda
- Class: Insecta
- Order: Lepidoptera
- Family: Nymphalidae
- Genus: Bebearia
- Species: B. schoutedeni

Binomial name
- Bebearia schoutedeni (Overlaet, 1954)

Synonyms
- Euryphene schoutedeni Overlaet, 1954

Species of butterfly

Bebearia schoutedeni is a butterfly in the family Nymphalidae. It is found in the Democratic Republic of the Congo (Shaba) and Zambia.
