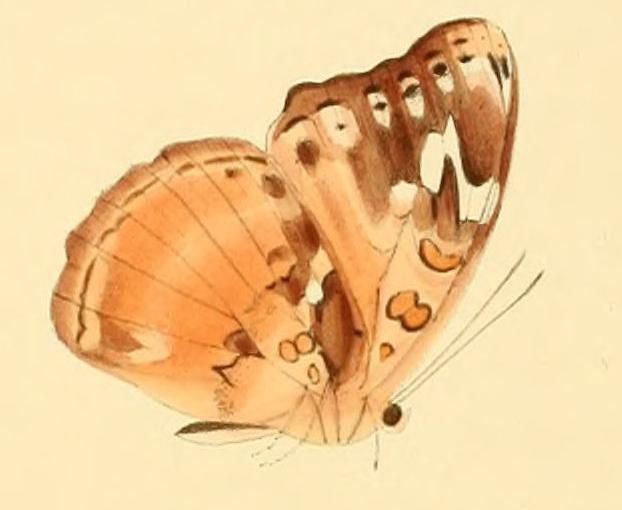

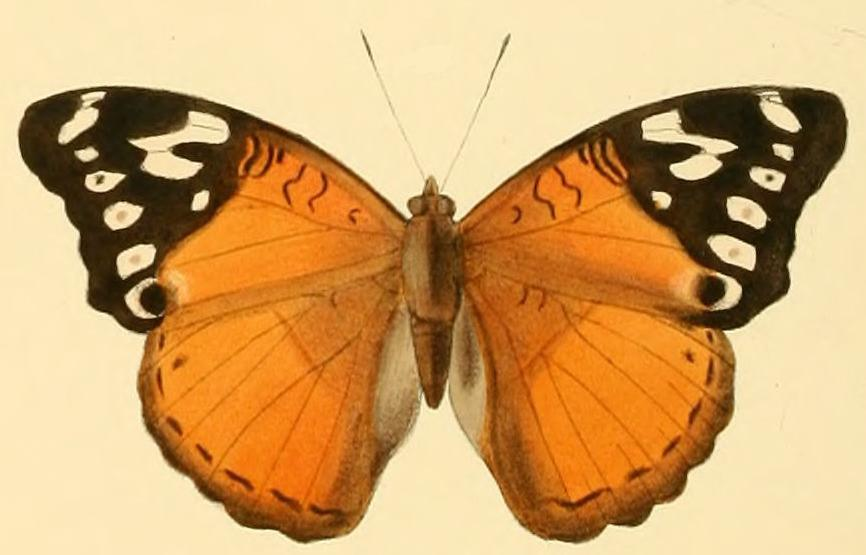

Scientific classification
- Kingdom: Animalia
- Phylum: Arthropoda
- Class: Insecta
- Order: Lepidoptera
- Family: Nymphalidae
- Genus: Bebearia
- Species: B. elpinice

Binomial name
- Bebearia elpinice (Hewitson, 1869)

Synonyms
- Euryphene elpinice Hewitson, 1869; Bebearia (Apectinaria) elpinice; Euryphene goodii Holland, 1886

= Bebearia elpinice =

Species of butterfly

Bebearia elpinice, the strange forester, is a butterfly in the family Nymphalidae. It is found in eastern Nigeria, Cameroon, Gabon, the Republic of the Congo and the Democratic Republic of the Congo. The habitat consists of forests.

The wings in the male red-yellow above, little marked with black; the cell of the forewing with a black ring in the middle and a hollow transverse marking at the end; beyond the cell three black transverse lines begin at the costal margin, of which the first only extends to vein 4, the second is continued by some indistinct free spots in cellules 4—2 and the third reaches vein 1, but is broken up into spots; at the distal margin a black marginal band 2 mm. in breadth; the upperside of the hindwing is broadly black-grey at the costal margin and has in addition a dark marginal band only 1mm. in breadth, an even narrower submarginal band broken up into streaks and some dark transverse markings in the cell; the underside of the forewing is dark violet-brown with two large spots in the cell, a spot at the costal margin beyond the apex of the cell and the apex of the wing white or whitish; on the hindwing the basal area and a broad costal stripe are black-brown, the basal area, however, with a whitish band between vein la and the anterior margin of the cell, the distal half is violet-grey and has beyond the middle some dark spots, basally bounded by whitish streaks. The female is orange above and has the apical part of the forewing as far as the cell black with a short, dentate white oblique band between the middle of the costal margin and vein 4 and white submarginal spots in cellules 3—9; the hindwing only with dark marginal band and submarginal line; the under surface as in the male only somewhat lighter. Old Calabar to Ogowe.
