= Bebearia bouyeri =

Scientific classification
- Kingdom: Animalia
- Phylum: Arthropoda
- Class: Insecta
- Order: Lepidoptera
- Family: Nymphalidae
- Genus: Bebearia
- Species: B. bouyeri

Binomial name
- Bebearia bouyeri van de Weghe, 2007

Species of butterfly

Bebearia bouyeri is a species of butterfly of the family Nymphalidae. It is found in Cameroon.
