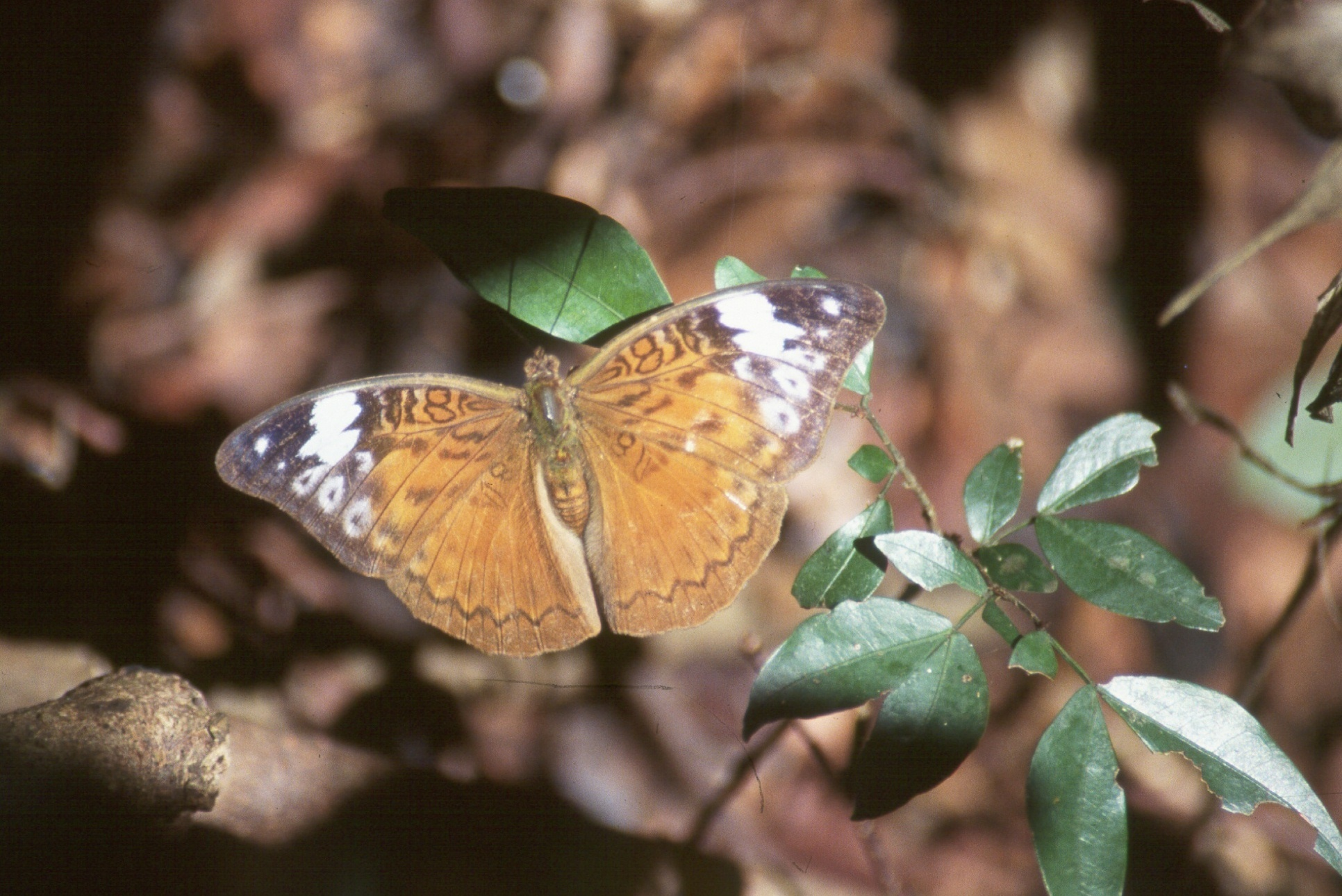

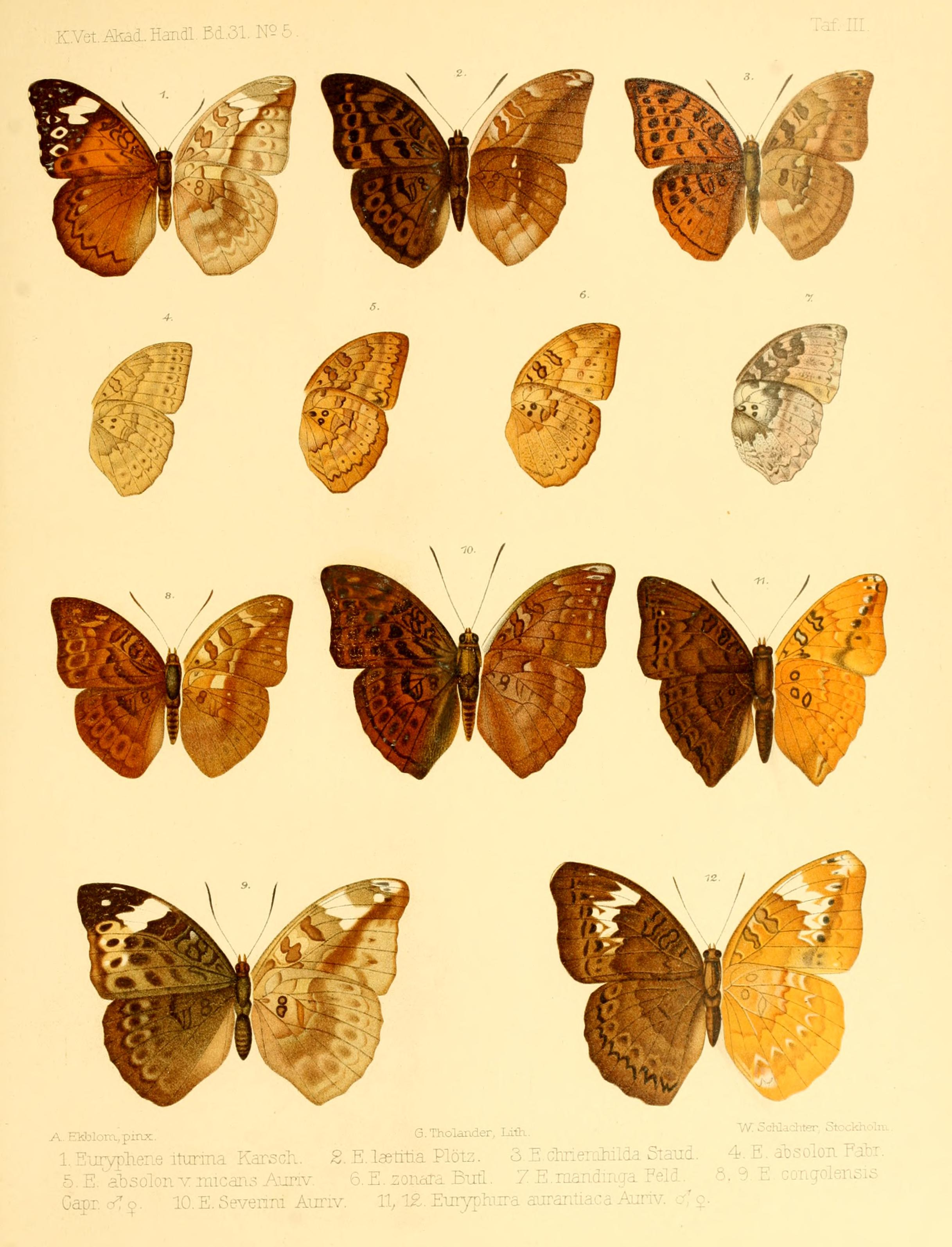
- as iturina

Scientific classification
- Kingdom: Animalia
- Phylum: Arthropoda
- Class: Insecta
- Order: Lepidoptera
- Family: Nymphalidae
- Genus: Bebearia
- Species: B. brunhilda

Binomial name
- Bebearia brunhilda (Kirby, 1889)

Synonyms
- Euryphene brunhilda Kirby, 1889; Bebearia (Bebearia) brunhilda; Euryphene iturina Karsch, 1894

= Bebearia brunhilda =

Species of butterfly

Bebearia brunhilda is a butterfly in the family Nymphalidae. It is found in Cameroon, the Democratic Republic of the Congo, Uganda and possibly Tanzania.

E. brunhilda Kirby. Under this name Kirby described as the male a form which seems to be identical with laetitia and as the female a species which is unknown to me. The description of the female is as follows: "Female tawny; anterior wings with the apical half brown, an irregular white blotch on the costa just beyond the middle, and a submarginal row of bluish-white spots, the larger ones centred with black, and the last of the series replaced by a black spot; posterior wings with a submarginal row of dusky markings, followed within by a row of obsolete dusky spots. Underside pinkish grey, with some indistinct annular markings in the cells, and the light markings of the upperside reproduced; a pale spot at the apex of the anterior wings, from below which a brown band curves inwards to the middle of the inner margin, and outwards across the middle of the posterior wings". This description is not adequate to differentiate the species with certainty from its allies. Cameroons.

E. iturina Karsch (41 b).[synonym] The male is dark yellow-brown or light chestnut-brown above and has the usual dark transverse bands narrow and continuous, only the fourth is almost completely broken up into rounded spots; the distal margin of the forewing is moderately emarginate and the submarginal line of the hindwing strongly undulate or almost angled; under surface of the wings grey-brown; in the forewing the distal part from the middle of the hindmargin to the apex is dark brown with the inner margin almost straight and encloses a transverse row of 5 slightly lighter, rounded, dark-pupilled spots posteriorly increasing in size; the inner boundary-line of this triangular dark brown distal border is proximally accompanied by an undulate dark brown line and the interspace between the two is filled up with dirty grey; hindwing beneath with two contiguous brown ring-spots in the cell, near the costal margin shortly before the middle of cellule 7 with a dirty white transverse spot and behind this with a washed-out brown arcuate band. In the female the apical part of the forewing from the middle of the costal margin to the hinder angle is blackish with a white subapical band composed of three spots in cellules 4—6 and thick white rings to the submarginal spots in cellules 2—4;the basal half of the forewing and the hindwing are yellow-brown with incomplete or indistinct black markings, only the submarginal line of the hindwing is sharply expressed, continuous and acutely angled; under surface lighter than in the male, greenish or yellowish grey with the same markings as in the male. Congo region, on the Ubangi and Ituri Rivers.

== Subspecies ==
- Bebearia brunhilda brunhilda (Cameroon, Democratic Republic of the Congo, western Uganda)
- Bebearia brunhilda iturina (Karsch, 1894) (north-eastern Democratic Republic of the Congo, western Uganda)
- Bebearia brunhilda sankuruensis Hecq, 1989 (Democratic Republic of the Congo: Sankuru)
