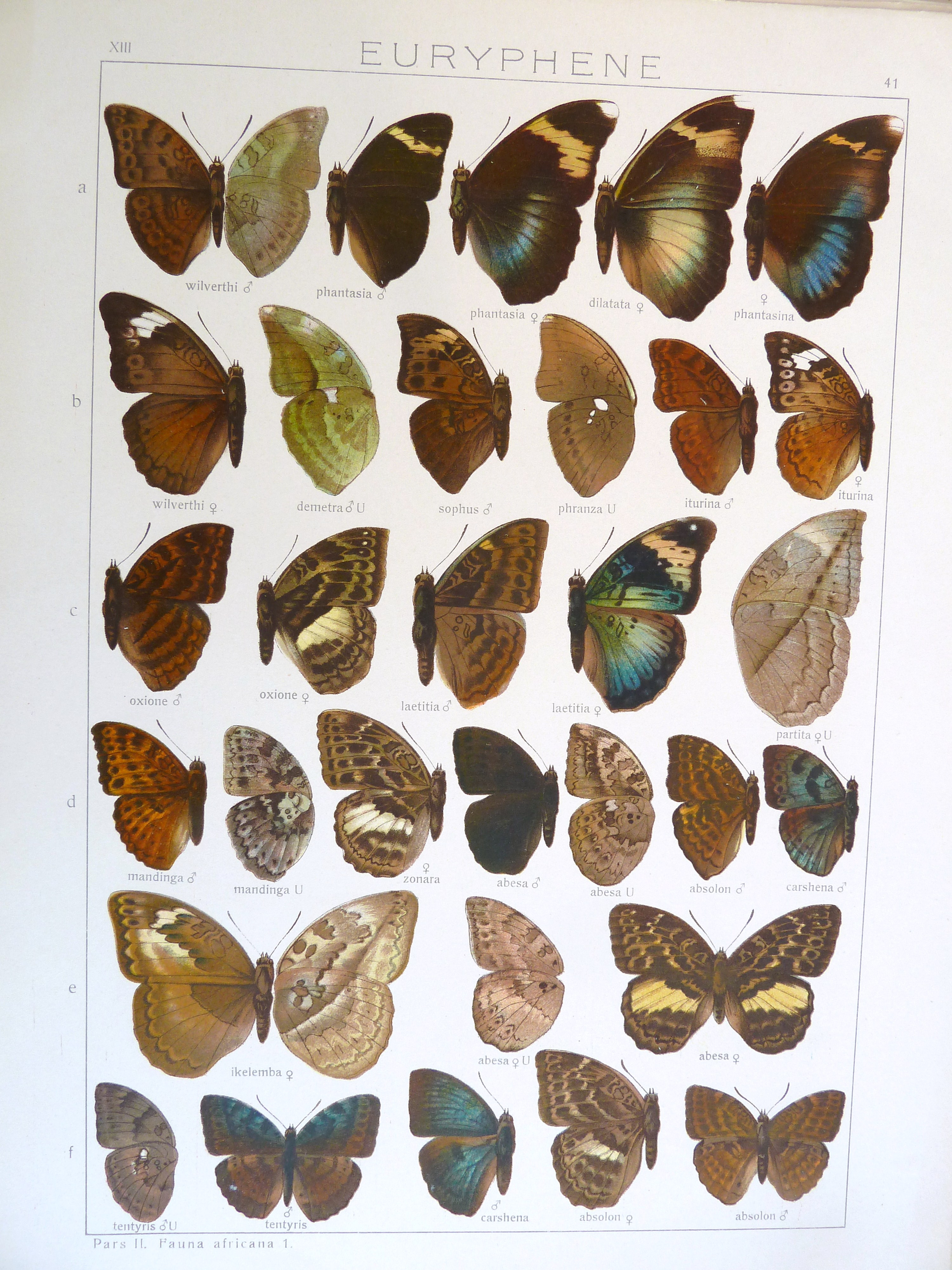
- B. a. wilverthi in Adalbert Seitz's Fauna Africana

Scientific classification
- Kingdom: Animalia
- Phylum: Arthropoda
- Class: Insecta
- Order: Lepidoptera
- Family: Nymphalidae
- Genus: Bebearia
- Species: B. aurora

Binomial name
- Bebearia aurora (Aurivillius, 1896)

Synonyms
- Euryphene aurora Aurivillius, 1896; Euryphene wilwerthi kayonza Jackson, 1956; Euryphene wilverthi Aurivillius, 1898

= Bebearia aurora =

Species of butterfly

Bebearia aurora is a butterfly in the family Nymphalidae. It is found in the Central African Republic, the Democratic Republic of the Congo, Zambia and Uganda.

E. aurora Auriv. is only known in the female [1921 ]. The wings are very dark brown above, at the apex of the forewing to vein 5 nearly black; the dark transverse bands are indistinct; the subapical band, which forms a spot in cellule 4 also, and the apex of the forewing are white; from vein 2 of the forewing to vein 2 of the hindwing runs a very indistinctly defined, bluish violet or bronzy median band; the under surface is dull green, in the basal part of the hindwing somewhat darker and beyond the middle interrupted by the thick, somewhat lighter rings of the postdiscal spots; as in many other species, a curved, dark olive-brown stripe runs from the apex of the forewing to the middle of the hindmargin; in addition to the white markings of the upper surface the forewing has a transverse band in the cell and the hindwing a transverse streak in cellule 7. Congo region, on the Ubangi River.

== Subspecies ==
- B. a. aurora (north-eastern Democratic Republic of the Congo)
- B. a. graueri Hecq, 1990 (Democratic Republic of the Congo)
- B. a. kayonza (Jackson, 1956) (Uganda: south-west to the Kigezi district)
- B. a. theia Hecq, 1989 (Democratic Republic of the Congo: Shaba, Zambia)
- B. a. wilverthi (Aurivillius, 1898) (Central African Republic, central Democratic Republic of the Congo)
