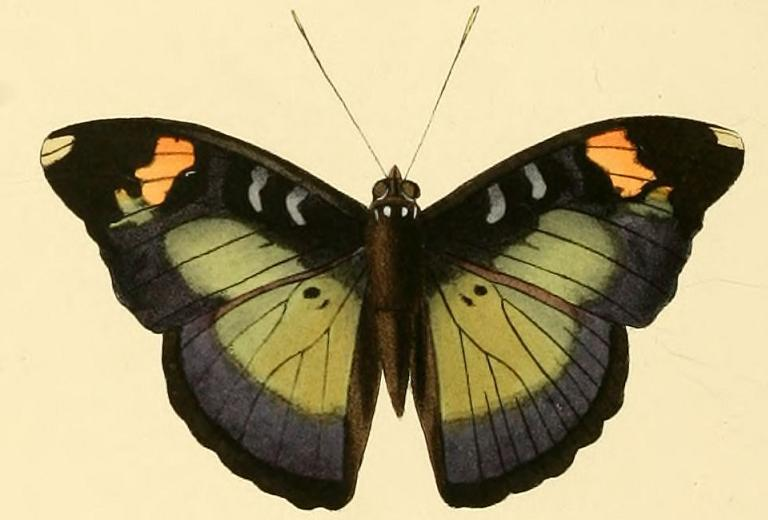

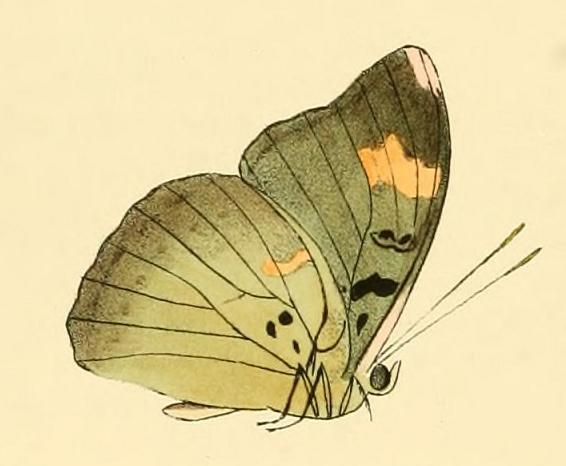

Scientific classification
- Kingdom: Animalia
- Phylum: Arthropoda
- Class: Insecta
- Order: Lepidoptera
- Family: Nymphalidae
- Genus: Bebearia
- Species: B. chilonis

Binomial name
- Bebearia chilonis (Hewitson, 1874)

Synonyms
- Euryphene chilonis Hewitson, 1874; Euryphene chilonis ab. albicosta Schultze, 1920

= Bebearia chilonis =

Species of butterfly

Bebearia chilonis is a butterfly in the family Nymphalidae. It is found in Cameroon, Gabon and the Democratic Republic of the Congo (Ubangi).

E. chilonis Hew. In the male the wings are black above with dark violet or purple reflection and narrow black marginal band; both wings with common bright green median band 9—14 mm. in breadth, extending from vein 3 of the fore wing to vein 1 b of the hindwing and becoming broader posteriorly; the subapical band of the forewing bright yellow and sharply defined but short, only consisting of three spots in cellules 4—6; the apex of the fore wing white on both surfaces and the cell of the forewing with two blue transverse streaks. The under surface is bright grass-green and only spotted with black in the cells; the subapical band of the forewing as above, only somewhat broader; the hindwing with yellowish transverse streak in cellule 7; the submarginal line indistinct, brownish. The female is unknown to me [Fruhstorfer]. This rare species is only known from Gaboon and the Ubangi River.
