= Bebearia luteola =

Scientific classification
- Kingdom: Animalia
- Phylum: Arthropoda
- Class: Insecta
- Order: Lepidoptera
- Family: Nymphalidae
- Genus: Bebearia
- Species: B. luteola

Binomial name
- Bebearia luteola (Bethune-Baker, 1908)

Synonyms
- Euryphene luteola Bethune-Baker, 1908

Species of butterfly

Bebearia luteola is a butterfly in the family Nymphalidae. It is found in the Democratic Republic of the Congo (Mongala, Uele, north Kivu, Tshopo and Lualaba).

E. luteola Baker. Upper surface of both wings deep velvety blackish bronzy green; forewing beyond the cell and vein 3 somewhat lighter (yellowish) bronzy green; this lighter colour, however, reaches neither the base nor the distal margin; in the cell there are three dark spots, one at the base, one in the middle and a larger one at the apex; a yellowish oblique band between the costal margin and vein 5, terminating in cellule 4 with a yellow patch; the apex usually with a small yellow spot; an indistinct row of dark submarginal spots; on the hindwing the bronze-green colour often extends nearly to the distal margin; a trace of a dark submarginal line. Beneath both wings olive-green with all the markings of the upper surface more or less showing through: the base of the costal margin of the forewing is light bluish white to the middle of the cell; the forewing with dark, sometimes obsolete submarginal spots; the hindwing with three black spots in the cell and a white transverse spot at the middle of cellule 7; the postdiscal spots and the submarginal line dark but not sharply defined; cellules 1 a—2 more or less suffused with yellowish. Expanse 77 mm. Congo.
