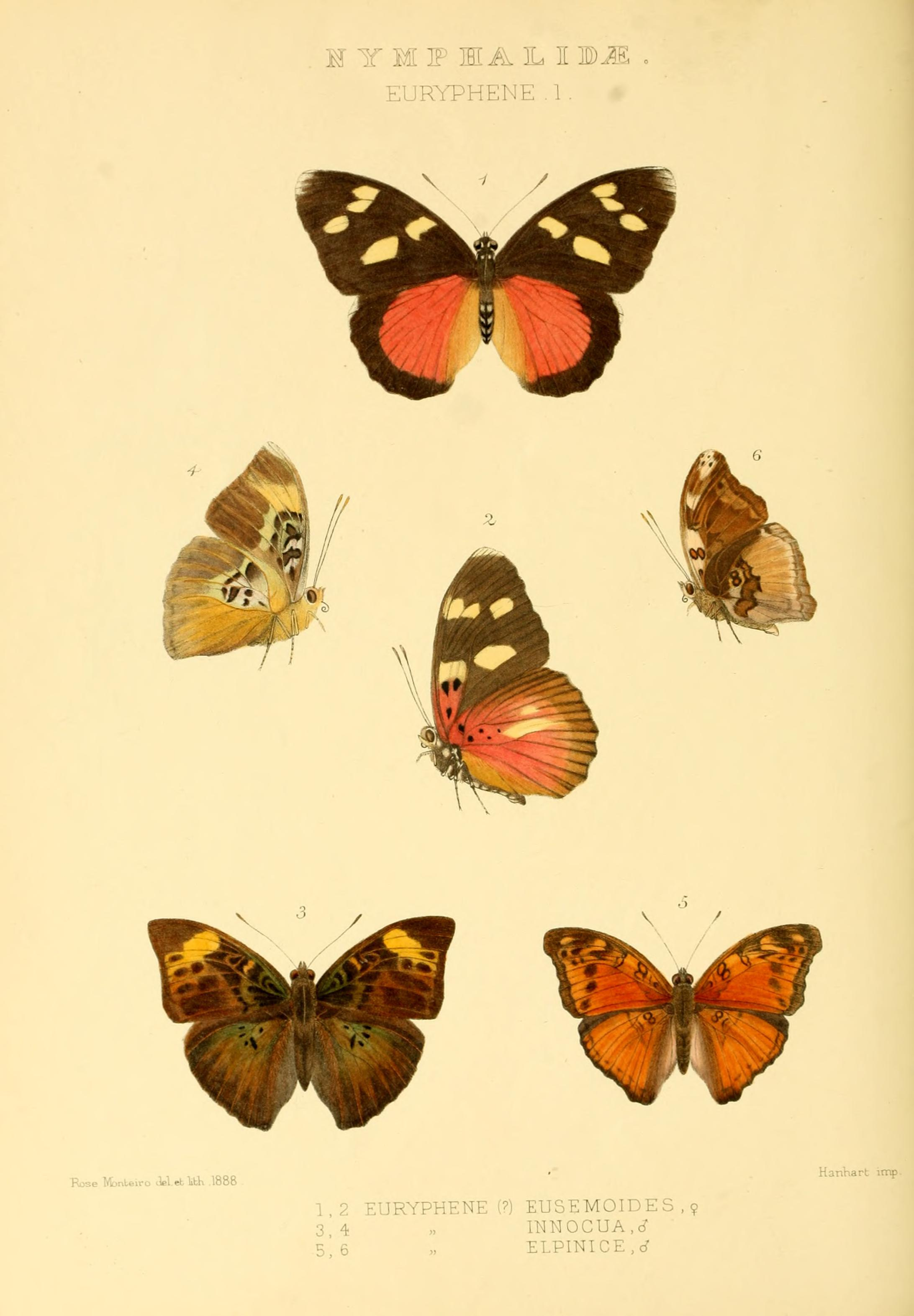
- Bebearia innocua in Rhopalocera Exotica

Scientific classification
- Kingdom: Animalia
- Phylum: Arthropoda
- Class: Insecta
- Order: Lepidoptera
- Family: Nymphalidae
- Genus: Bebearia
- Species: B. innocua

Binomial name
- Bebearia innocua (Grose-Smith & Kirby, 1889)

Synonyms
- Euryphene innocua Grose-Smith and Kirby, 1889; Bebearia (Bebearia) innocua

= Bebearia innocua =

Species of butterfly

Bebearia innocua, the innocuous forester, is a butterfly in the family Nymphalidae. It is found in Nigeria and Cameroon. Their habitat consists of forests.

E. innocua Sm.& Kirby is similar to the of cutteri, but the upper surface is lighter, with black-brown ground-colour and hence with the dark transverse bands or transverse rows of spots standing out rather distinctly; the hindwing is bluish green from the base to beyond the middle, with some black spots in and behind the cell; the forewing at the base and hindmargin only indistinctly greenish; the under surface in the basal part bluish green with black spots, in the distal part blackish brown and at the inner margin of the hindwing yellowish; the black discal spots absent or very indistinct; the submarginal line is placed close to the distal margin, but is fine and very indistinct. Lagos to Cameroons.
