= Euriphene pavo =

Scientific classification
- Domain: Eukaryota
- Kingdom: Animalia
- Phylum: Arthropoda
- Class: Insecta
- Order: Lepidoptera
- Family: Nymphalidae
- Genus: Euriphene
- Species: E. pavo

Binomial name
- Euriphene pavo (Howarth, 1959)

Synonyms
- Diestogyna pavo Howarth, 1959; Euriphene (Euriphene) pavo

Species of butterfly

Euriphene pavo, or Howarth's nymph, is a butterfly in the family Nymphalidae. It is found in Nigeria and Cameroon. The habitat consists of forests.
