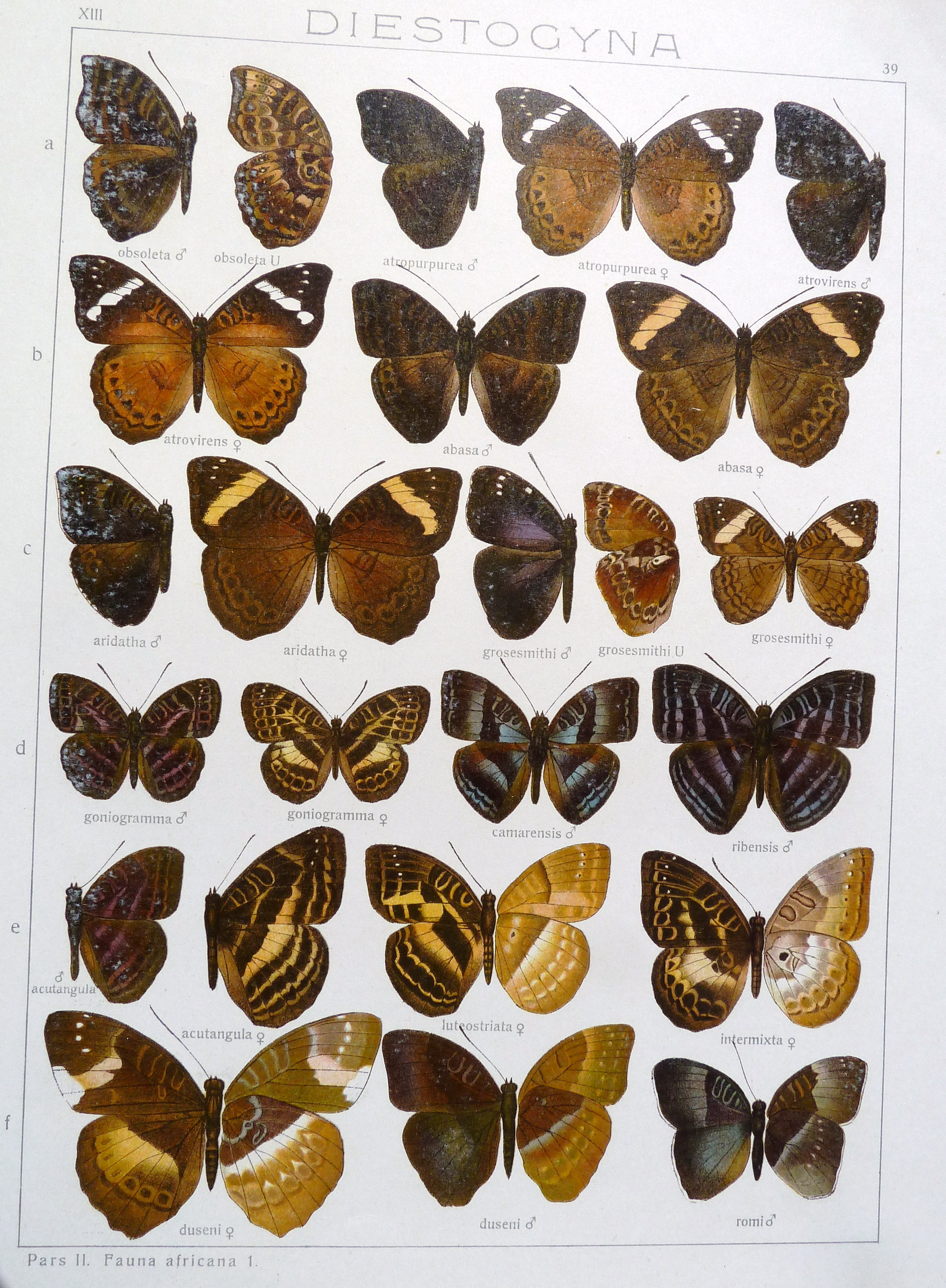
- In Adalbert Seitz's Fauna Africana

Scientific classification
- Kingdom: Animalia
- Phylum: Arthropoda
- Class: Insecta
- Order: Lepidoptera
- Family: Nymphalidae
- Genus: Euriphene
- Species: E. camarensis

Binomial name
- Euriphene camarensis (Ward, 1871)

Synonyms
- Euryphene camarensis Ward, 1871; Euriphene (Euriphene) camarensis

= Euriphene camarensis =

Species of butterfly

Euriphene camarensis is a butterfly in the family Nymphalidae. It is found in Cameroon, Gabon and the Democratic Republic of the Congo (Mongala, Uele, Ituri, Equateur, Sankuru, Lomami).
