= Euriphene alberici =

Scientific classification
- Kingdom: Animalia
- Phylum: Arthropoda
- Class: Insecta
- Order: Lepidoptera
- Family: Nymphalidae
- Genus: Euriphene
- Species: E. alberici

Binomial name
- Euriphene alberici (Dufrane, 1945)

Synonyms
- Diestogyna alberici Dufrane, 1945; Euriphene (Euriphene) alberici

Species of butterfly

Euriphene alberici is a butterfly in the family Nymphalidae. It is found in the Democratic Republic of the Congo, from the eastern part of the country to Kivu.
