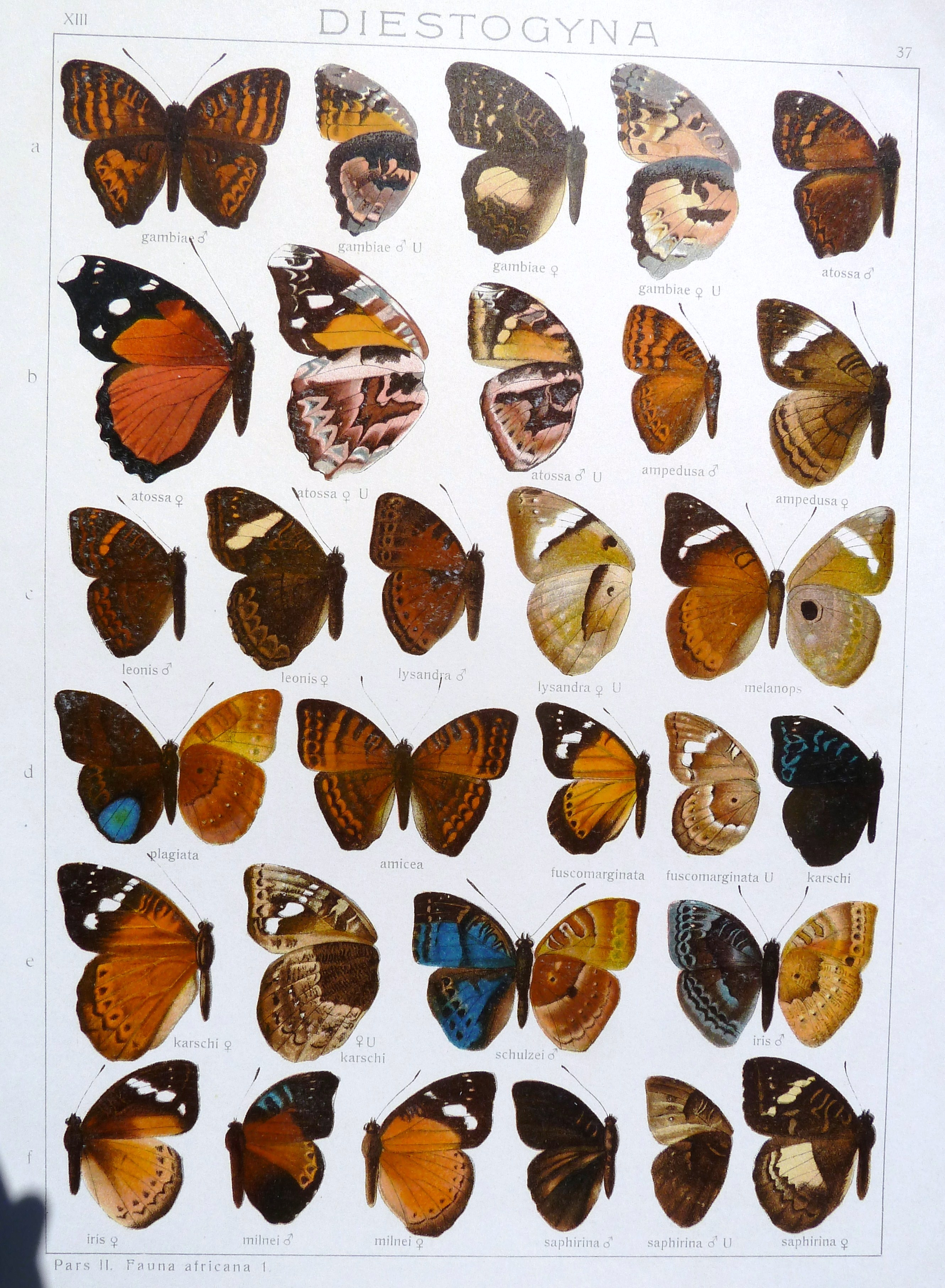
- In Adalbert Seitz's Fauna Africana

Scientific classification
- Kingdom: Animalia
- Phylum: Arthropoda
- Clade: Pancrustacea
- Class: Insecta
- Order: Lepidoptera
- Family: Nymphalidae
- Genus: Euriphene
- Species: E. karschi

Binomial name
- Euriphene karschi (Aurivillius, 1894)

Synonyms
- Diestogyna karschi Aurivillius, 1894; Euriphene (Euriphene) karschi

= Euriphene karschi =

Species of butterfly

Euriphene karschi, or Karsch's nymph, is a butterfly in the family Nymphalidae. It is found in eastern Nigeria, Cameroon, Gabon, the Republic of the Congo and the Democratic Republic of the Congo. Its natural habitat are the rainforests in said country.
