= Euriphene splendida =

Scientific classification
- Domain: Eukaryota
- Kingdom: Animalia
- Phylum: Arthropoda
- Class: Insecta
- Order: Lepidoptera
- Family: Nymphalidae
- Genus: Euriphene
- Species: E. splendida

Binomial name
- Euriphene splendida Collins & Larsen, 1997

Synonyms
- Euriphene (Euriphene) splendida

Species of butterfly

Euriphene splendida is a butterfly in the family Nymphalidae. It is found in the Republic of the Congo.
