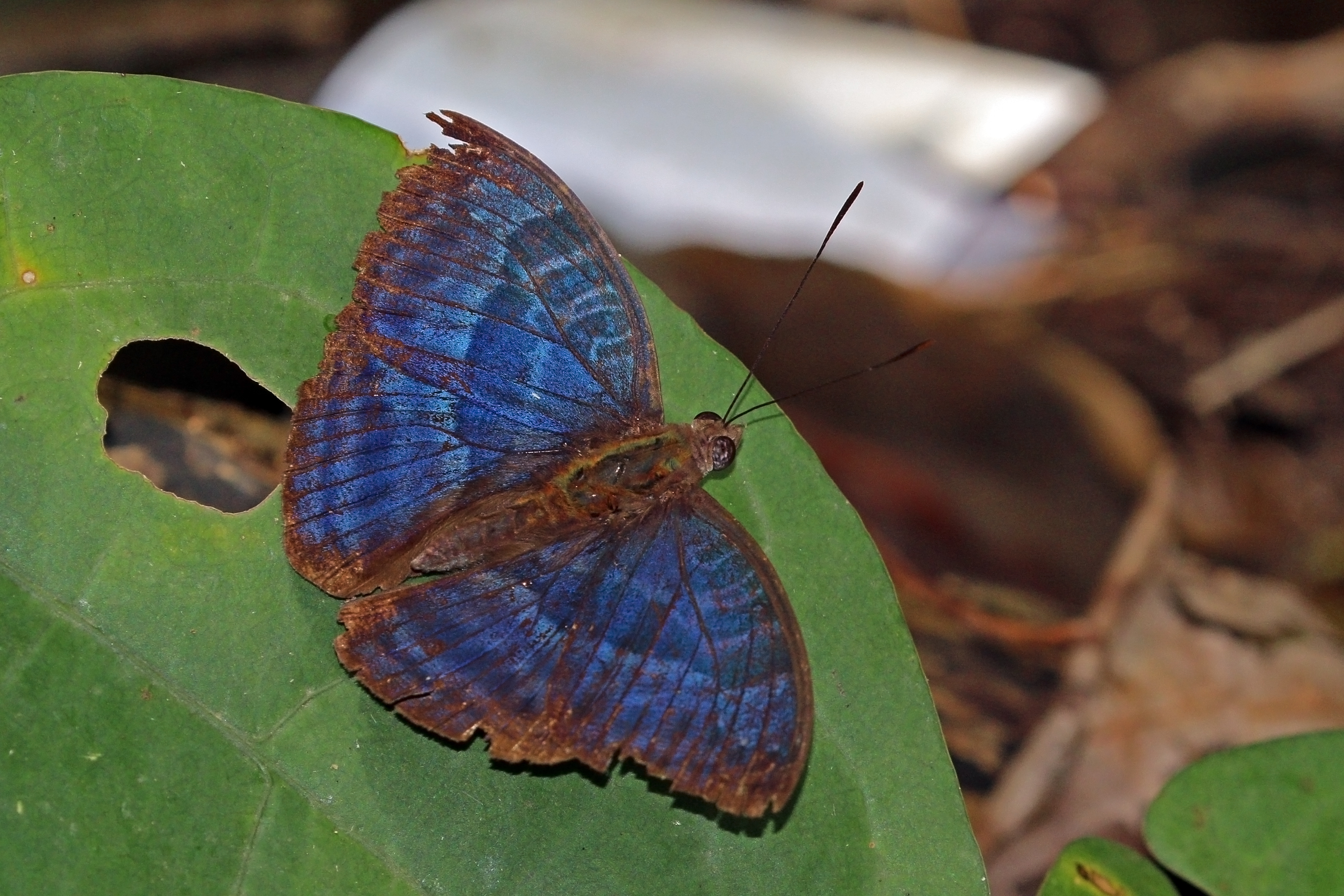
- male, Kakum National Park, Ghana

Scientific classification
- Kingdom: Animalia
- Phylum: Arthropoda
- Clade: Pancrustacea
- Class: Insecta
- Order: Lepidoptera
- Family: Nymphalidae
- Genus: Euriphene
- Species: E. veronica

Binomial name
- Euriphene veronica (Stoll, 1780)

Synonyms
- Papilio veronica Stoll, 1780; Euriphene (Euriphene) veronica; Papilio gnidia Fabricius, 1793

= Euriphene veronica =

Species of butterfly

Euriphene veronica, the Veronica nymph, is a butterfly in the family Nymphalidae. It is found in Guinea, Sierra Leone, Liberia, southern Ivory Coast and western Ghana. The habitat consists of forests.

Torben Larsen developed a species numbering system for his 2005 publication Butterflies of West Africa. This species is #961. The 'Larsen' numbers have since been used with permission in A Sharp Eye on Butterflies of Ghana.
