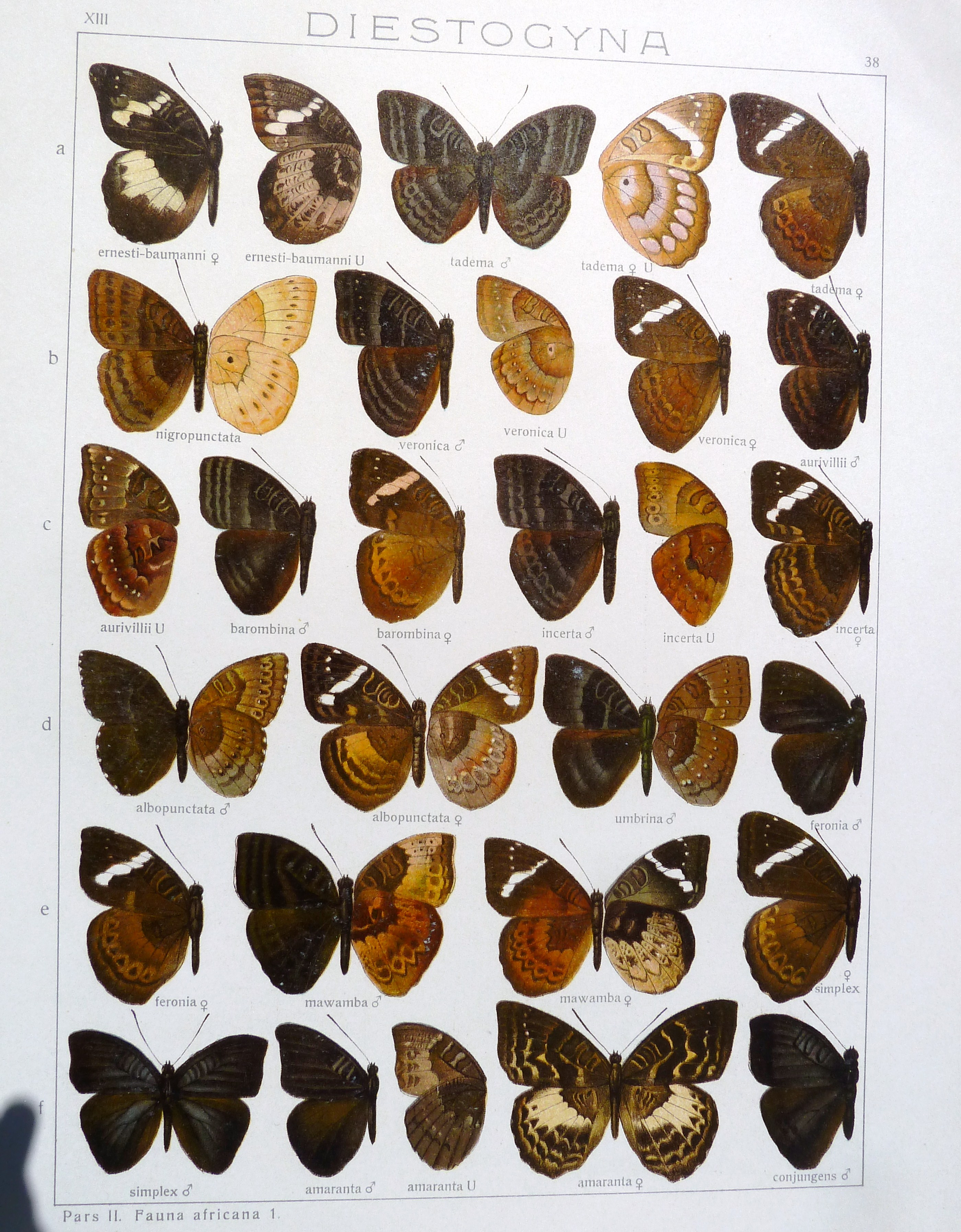
- In Adalbert Seitz's Fauna Africana

Scientific classification
- Domain: Eukaryota
- Kingdom: Animalia
- Phylum: Arthropoda
- Class: Insecta
- Order: Lepidoptera
- Family: Nymphalidae
- Genus: Euriphene
- Species: E. ernestibaumanni

Binomial name
- Euriphene ernestibaumanni (Karsch, 1895)

Synonyms
- Diestogyna ernesti-baumanni Karsch, 1895; Euriphene (Euriphene) ernestibaumanni; Diestogyna obsoleta integribasis Hulstaert, 1924

= Euriphene ernestibaumanni =

Species of butterfly

Euriphene ernestibaumanni, or Baumann's nymph, is a butterfly in the family Nymphalidae. It is found in Ivory Coast, Ghana, Togo, Nigeria, Cameroon and the Democratic Republic of the Congo. The habitat consists of forests.

== Subspecies ==
- Euriphene ernestibaumanni ernestibaumanni (eastern Ivory Coast, Ghana: Volta region, Togo, eastern Nigeria, western Cameroon)
- Euriphene ernestibaumanni integribasis (Hulstaert, 1924) (Democratic Republic of the Congo: Kasai, Sankuru, Lualaba)
