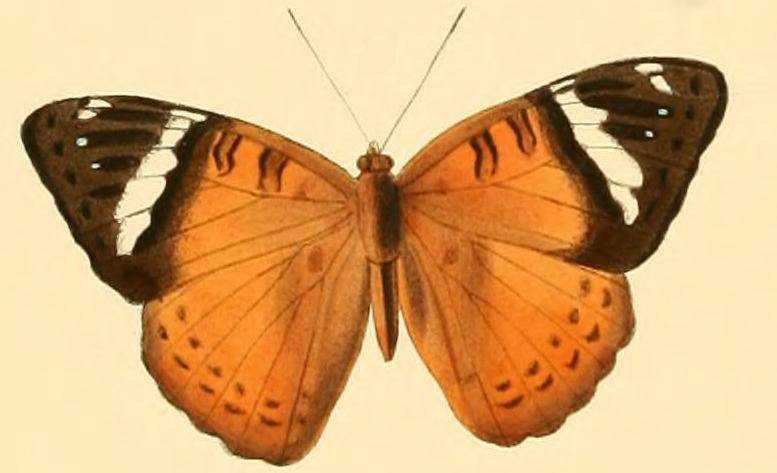

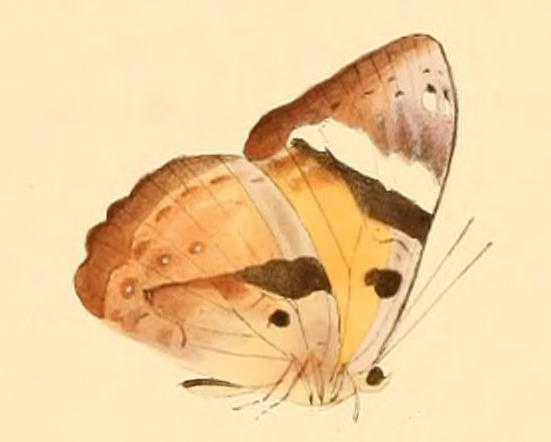

Scientific classification
- Domain: Eukaryota
- Kingdom: Animalia
- Phylum: Arthropoda
- Class: Insecta
- Order: Lepidoptera
- Family: Nymphalidae
- Genus: Euriphene
- Species: E. lysandra

Binomial name
- Euriphene lysandra (Stoll, 1790)

Synonyms
- Papilio lysandra Stoll, 1790; Euriphene (Doricleana) lysandra; Aterica zeugma Hewitson, 1869; Euriphene doriclea lysandra (Stoll, 1790)

= Euriphene lysandra =

Species of butterfly

Euriphene lysandra, the Lysandra nymph, is a species or subspecies of butterfly in the family Nymphalidae. It is found in southern Nigeria, Cameroon, Equatorial Guinea, Gabon, the Republic of the Congo, the Central African Republic, and the Democratic Republic of the Congo (Moyen-Congo and Mayumbe). The habitat consists of forests.

The larvae feed on Dichapetalum species.
