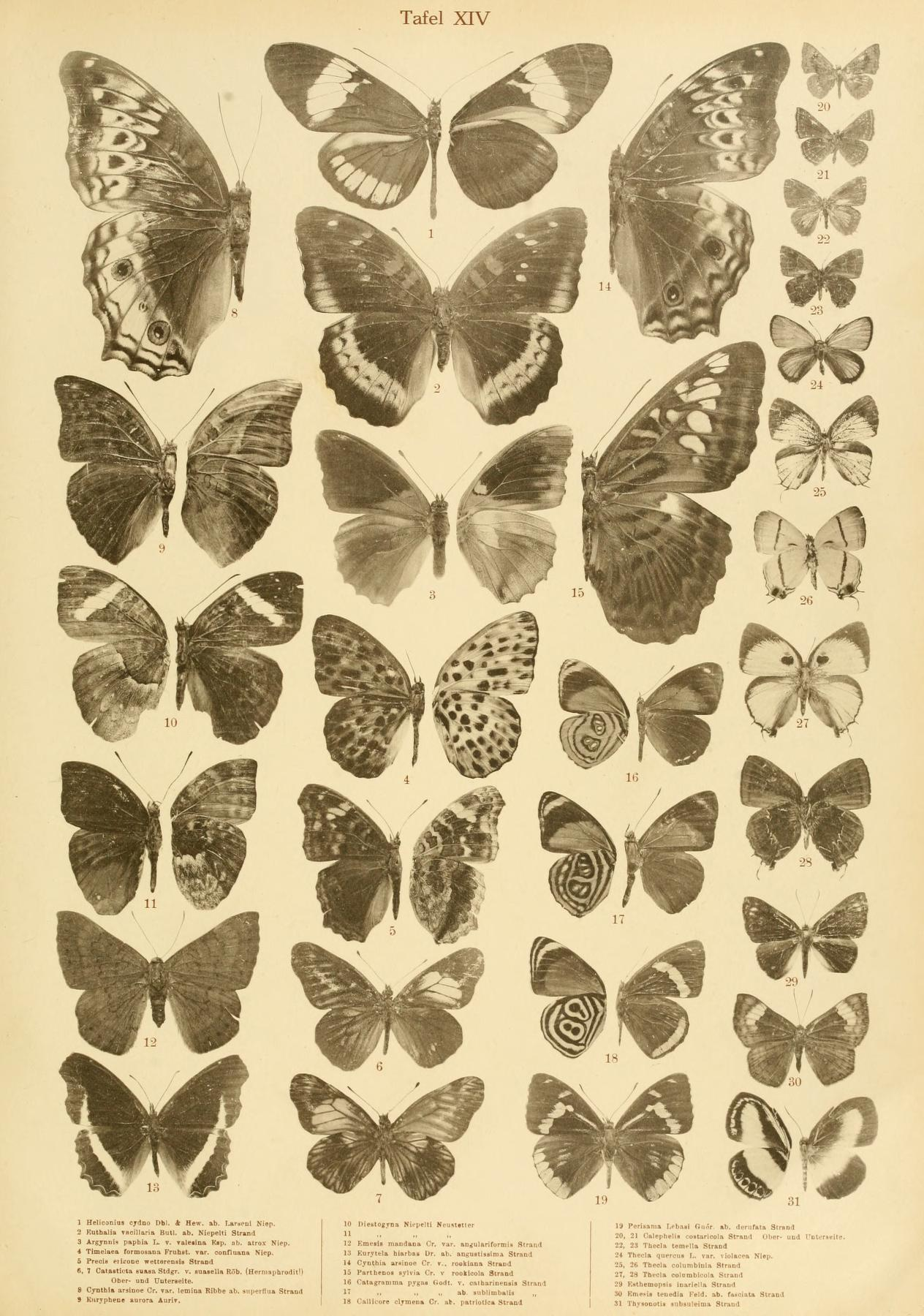
- Figures 10 and 11 in Lepidoptera Niepeltiana

Scientific classification
- Domain: Eukaryota
- Kingdom: Animalia
- Phylum: Arthropoda
- Class: Insecta
- Order: Lepidoptera
- Family: Nymphalidae
- Genus: Euriphene
- Species: E. niepelti

Binomial name
- Euriphene niepelti Neustetter, 1916

Synonyms
- Diestogyna niepelti Neustetter, 1916; Euriphene (Euriphene) niepelti

= Euriphene niepelti =

Species of butterfly

Euriphene niepelti is a butterfly in the family Nymphalidae. It is found in Cameroon and the Democratic Republic of the Congo.
