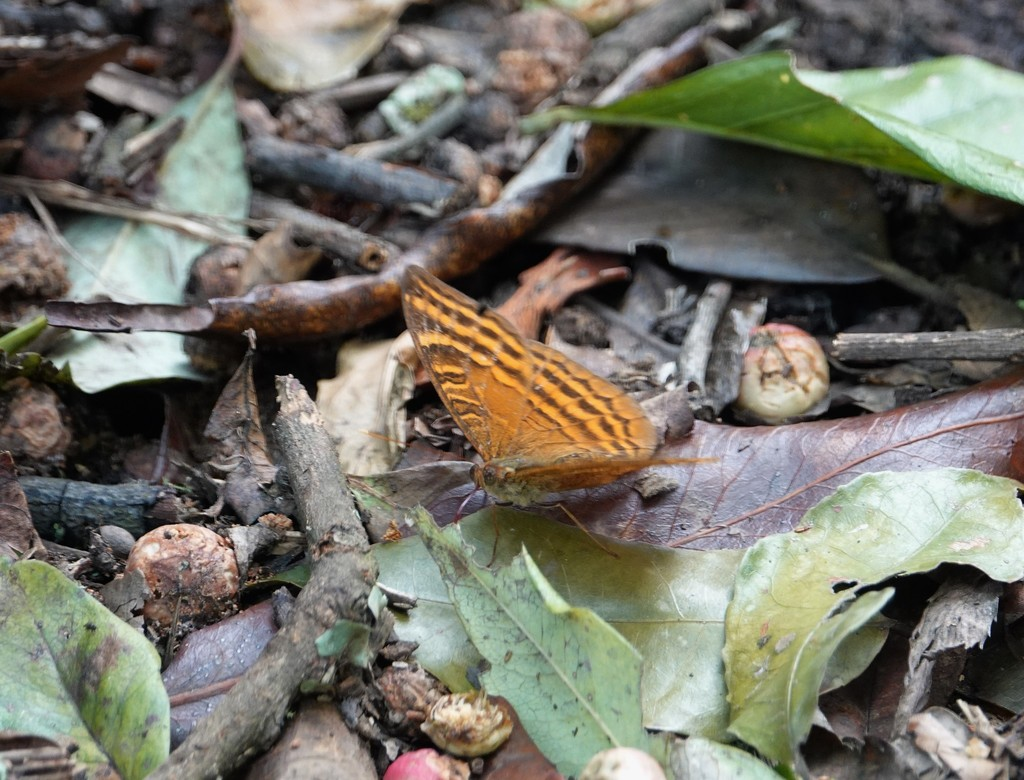

Scientific classification
- Kingdom: Animalia
- Phylum: Arthropoda
- Class: Insecta
- Order: Lepidoptera
- Family: Nymphalidae
- Genus: Euriphene
- Species: E. excelsior

Binomial name
- Euriphene excelsior (Rebel, 1911)

Synonyms
- Diestogyna excelsior Rebel, 1911; Euriphene (Euriphene) excelsior

= Euriphene excelsior =

Species of butterfly

Euriphene excelsior is a butterfly in the family Nymphalidae. It is found in the Democratic Republic of the Congo (Kivu and Uele), Uganda, Rwanda and Burundi.
