= Euriphene kiki =

Scientific classification
- Domain: Eukaryota
- Kingdom: Animalia
- Phylum: Arthropoda
- Class: Insecta
- Order: Lepidoptera
- Family: Nymphalidae
- Genus: Euriphene
- Species: E. kiki

Binomial name
- Euriphene kiki Bernardi & Larsen, 1980

Synonyms
- Euriphene (Euriphene) kiki

Species of butterfly

Euriphene kiki, or Kiki's nymph, is a butterfly in the family Nymphalidae. It is found in Nigeria. The habitat consists of forests.

It is known only from the holotype male which was found in a patch of relict forest that has since been destroyed.
