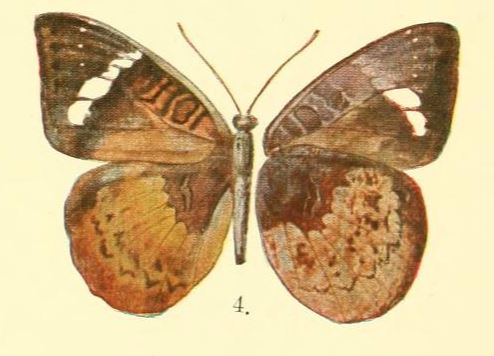

Scientific classification
- Kingdom: Animalia
- Phylum: Arthropoda
- Class: Insecta
- Order: Lepidoptera
- Family: Nymphalidae
- Genus: Euriphene
- Species: E. mawamba

Binomial name
- Euriphene mawamba (Bethune-Baker, 1908)

Synonyms
- Diestogyna mawamba Bethune-Baker, 1908; Euriphene (Euriphene) mawamba

= Euriphene mawamba =

Species of butterfly

Euriphene mawamba is a butterfly in the family Nymphalidae. It is found in the Democratic Republic of the Congo.
