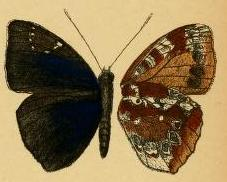

Scientific classification
- Domain: Eukaryota
- Kingdom: Animalia
- Phylum: Arthropoda
- Class: Insecta
- Order: Lepidoptera
- Family: Nymphalidae
- Genus: Euriphene
- Species: E. grosesmithi

Binomial name
- Euriphene grosesmithi (Staudinger, 1891)

Synonyms
- Aterica grose-smithi Staudinger, 1891; Euriphene (Euriphene) grosesmithi

= Euriphene grosesmithi =

Species of butterfly

Euriphene grosesmithi, or Grose-Smith's nymph, is a butterfly in the family Nymphalidae. It is found in eastern Ivory Coast, Ghana, Nigeria, Cameroon, Gabon, the Republic of the Congo, the Central African Republic and the Democratic Republic of the Congo. The habitat consists of forests.

== Subspecies ==
- Euriphene grosesmithi grosesmithi (Nigeria, Cameroon, Gabon, Congo, Central African Republic, western Democratic Republic of the Congo)
- Euriphene grosesmithi muehlenbergi Hecq, 1995 (Ivory Coast, Ghana)
