= Euriphene lomaensis =

Scientific classification
- Domain: Eukaryota
- Kingdom: Animalia
- Phylum: Arthropoda
- Class: Insecta
- Order: Lepidoptera
- Family: Nymphalidae
- Genus: Euriphene
- Species: E. lomaensis

Binomial name
- Euriphene lomaensis Belcastro, 1986

Synonyms
- Euriphene (Euriphene) lomaensis

Species of butterfly

Euriphene lomaensis, the Loma nymph, is a butterfly in the family Nymphalidae. It is found in Sierra Leone and Ivory Coast. It is normally found in forests.
