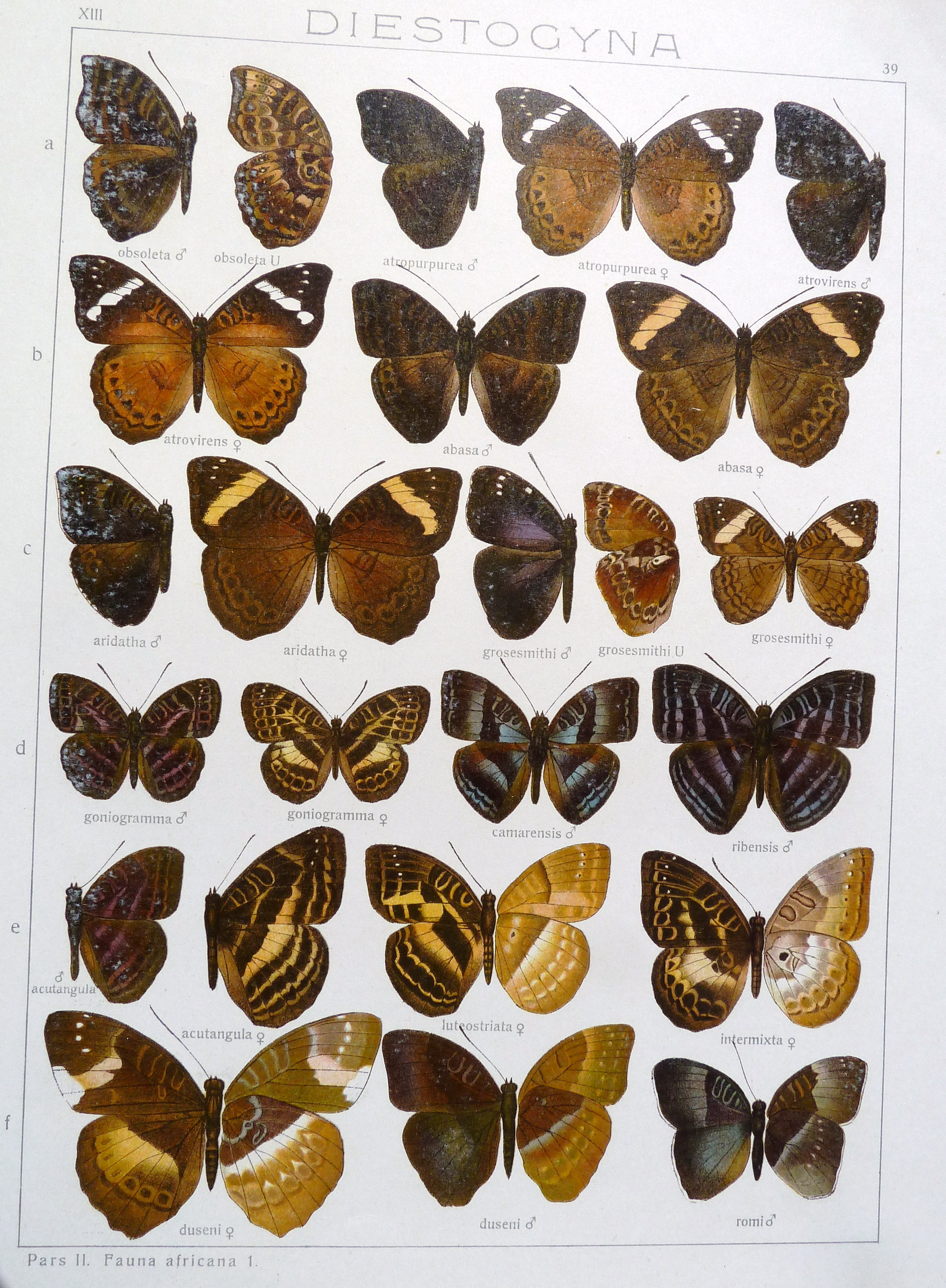
- In Adalbert Seitz's Fauna Africana

Scientific classification
- Domain: Eukaryota
- Kingdom: Animalia
- Phylum: Arthropoda
- Class: Insecta
- Order: Lepidoptera
- Family: Nymphalidae
- Genus: Euriphene
- Species: E. atrovirens

Binomial name
- Euriphene atrovirens (Mabille, 1878)

Synonyms
- Aterica atrovirens Mabille, 1878; Euriphene (Euriphene) atrovirens

= Euriphene atrovirens =

Species of butterfly

Euriphene atrovirens, the black nymph, is a butterfly in the family Nymphalidae. It is found in Nigeria, Cameroon, Gabon, the Republic of the Congo and the Democratic Republic of the Congo. The habitat consists of forests.

The larvae feed on Oubanguia species.
