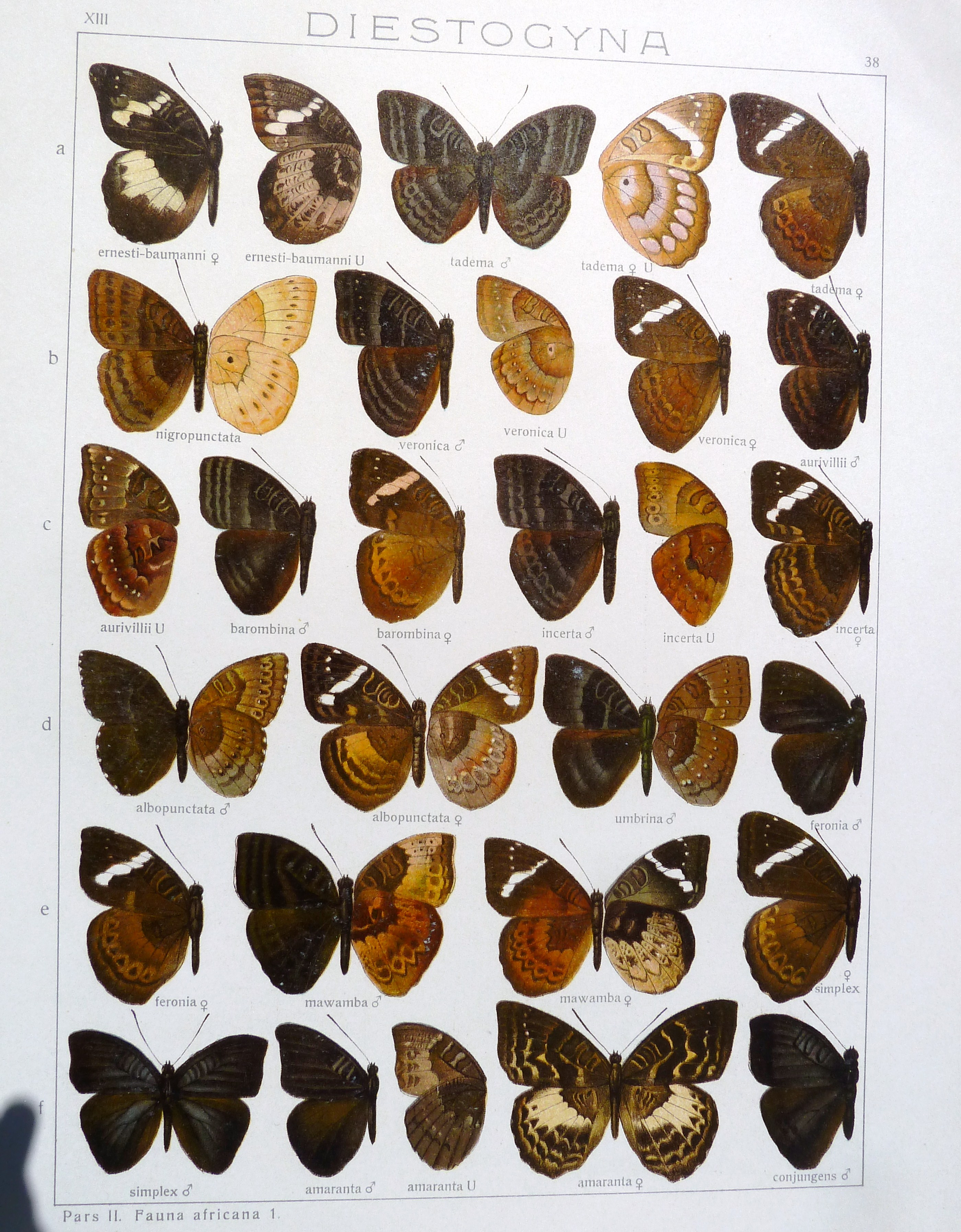
- In Adalbert Seitz's Fauna Africana

Scientific classification
- Domain: Eukaryota
- Kingdom: Animalia
- Phylum: Arthropoda
- Class: Insecta
- Order: Lepidoptera
- Family: Nymphalidae
- Genus: Euriphene
- Species: E. conjungens

Binomial name
- Euriphene conjungens (Aurivillius, 1909)

Synonyms
- Diestogyna conjungens Aurivillius, 1909; Euriphene (Euriphene) conjungens; Diestogyna chalybeata Talbot, 1937

= Euriphene conjungens =

Species of butterfly

Euriphene conjungens, the androconial nymph, is a butterfly in the family Nymphalidae. It is found in Cameroon, the Democratic Republic of the Congo, Uganda and Tanzania. The habitat consists of forests.

== Subspecies ==
- Euriphene conjungens conjungens (Cameroon)
- Euriphene conjungens chalybeata (Talbot, 1937) (Democratic Republic of the Congo: Sankuru, Uganda: western shore of Lake Victoria)
- Euriphene conjungens kiellandi Hecq, 1994 (north-western Tanzania)
