= Euriphene canui =

Scientific classification
- Domain: Eukaryota
- Kingdom: Animalia
- Phylum: Arthropoda
- Class: Insecta
- Order: Lepidoptera
- Family: Nymphalidae
- Genus: Euriphene
- Species: E. canui

Binomial name
- Euriphene canui Hecq, 1987

Synonyms
- Euriphene (Euriphene) canui

Species of butterfly

Euriphene canui is a butterfly in the family Nymphalidae. It is found on Bioko, an island off the west coast of Africa.
