= Euriphene jolyana =

Scientific classification
- Kingdom: Animalia
- Phylum: Arthropoda
- Class: Insecta
- Order: Lepidoptera
- Family: Nymphalidae
- Genus: Euriphene
- Species: E. jolyana

Binomial name
- Euriphene jolyana Hecq, 1987

Synonyms
- Euriphene (Euriphene) jolyana

Species of butterfly

Euriphene jolyana is a butterfly in the family Nymphalidae. It is found in the Democratic Republic of the Congo.
