= Euriphene pinkieana =

Scientific classification
- Domain: Eukaryota
- Kingdom: Animalia
- Phylum: Arthropoda
- Class: Insecta
- Order: Lepidoptera
- Family: Nymphalidae
- Genus: Euriphene
- Species: E. pinkieana

Binomial name
- Euriphene pinkieana Bernardi, 1975

Synonyms
- Euriphene (Euriphene) pinkieana

Species of butterfly

Euriphene pinkieana is a butterfly in the family Nymphalidae. It is found in Gabon and the Republic of the Congo. The habitat consists of forests.
