= Euriphene obani =

Scientific classification
- Domain: Eukaryota
- Kingdom: Animalia
- Phylum: Arthropoda
- Class: Insecta
- Order: Lepidoptera
- Family: Nymphalidae
- Genus: Euriphene
- Species: E. obani

Binomial name
- Euriphene obani Wojtusiak & Knoop, 1994

Synonyms
- Euriphene (Euriphene) obani

Species of butterfly

Euriphene obani, the Oban nymph, is a butterfly in the family Nymphalidae. It is found in Nigeria and Cameroon. The habitat consists of forests.
