= Euriphene monforti =

Scientific classification
- Kingdom: Animalia
- Phylum: Arthropoda
- Class: Insecta
- Order: Lepidoptera
- Family: Nymphalidae
- Genus: Euriphene
- Species: E. monforti

Binomial name
- Euriphene monforti Hecq, 1994

Synonyms
- Euriphene (Euriphene) monforti

Species of butterfly

Euriphene monforti is a butterfly in the family Nymphalidae. It is found in the Democratic Republic of the Congo.
