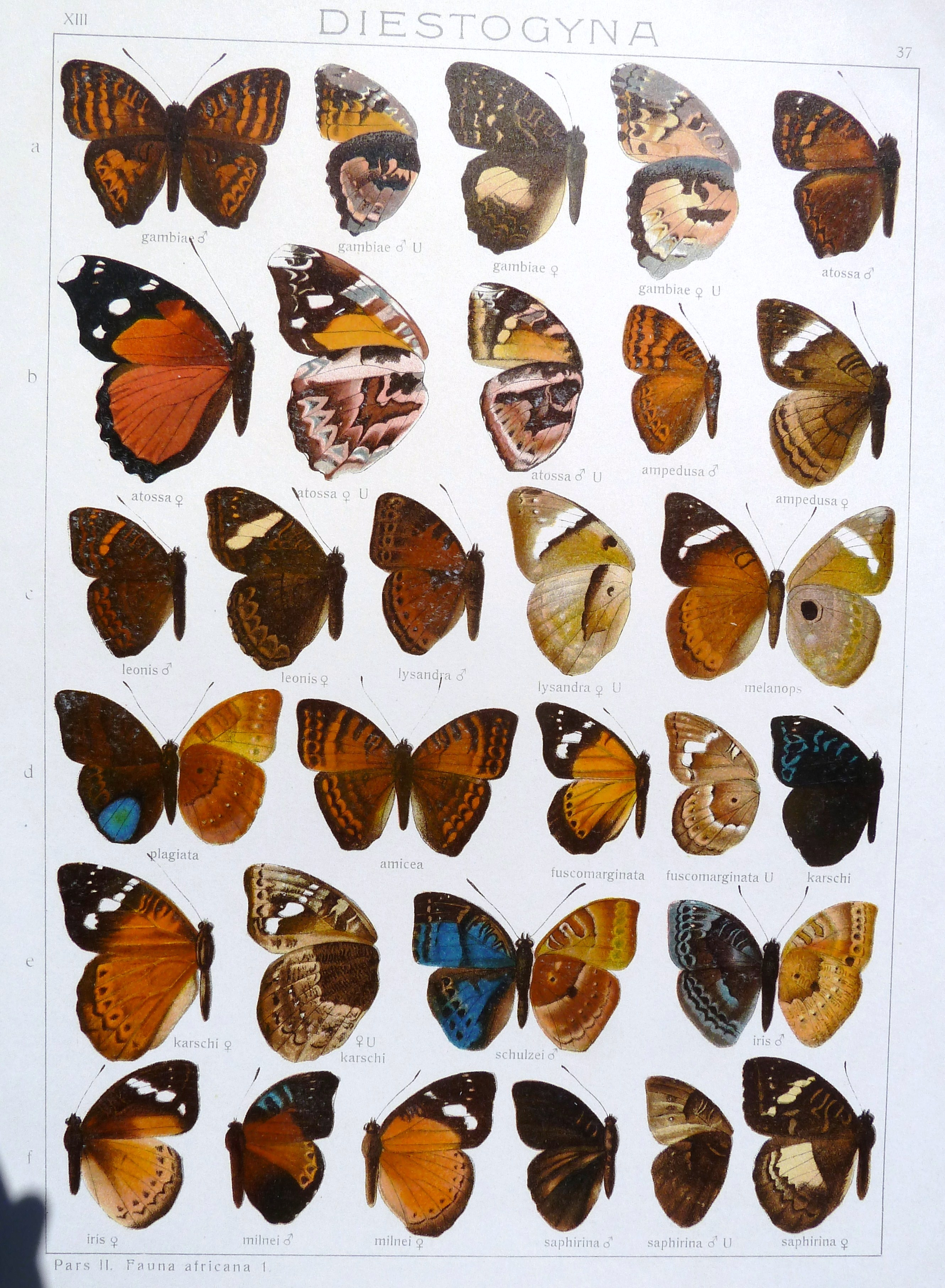
- In Adalbert Seitz's Fauna Africana

Scientific classification
- Kingdom: Animalia
- Phylum: Arthropoda
- Class: Insecta
- Order: Lepidoptera
- Family: Nymphalidae
- Genus: Euriphene
- Species: E. plagiata

Binomial name
- Euriphene plagiata (Aurivillius, 1897)

Synonyms
- Diestogyna plagiata Aurivillius, 1897; Euriphene (Euriphene) plagiata

= Euriphene plagiata =

Species of butterfly

Euriphene plagiata, the blue-spot nymph, is a butterfly in the family Nymphalidae. It is found in Nigeria, Cameroon, Gabon, Angola and the Democratic Republic of the Congo (from the central part of the country to Mai-Ndombe and Sankuru).
