= Euriphene obtusangula =

Scientific classification
- Domain: Eukaryota
- Kingdom: Animalia
- Phylum: Arthropoda
- Class: Insecta
- Order: Lepidoptera
- Family: Nymphalidae
- Genus: Euriphene
- Species: E. obtusangula

Binomial name
- Euriphene obtusangula (Aurivillius, 1912)

Synonyms
- Diestogyna obtusangula Aurivillius, 1912; Euriphene (Euriphene) obtusangula

Species of butterfly

Euriphene obtusangula, the banded nymph, is a butterfly in the family Nymphalidae. It is found in eastern Nigeria and Cameroon. The habitat consists of forests.
