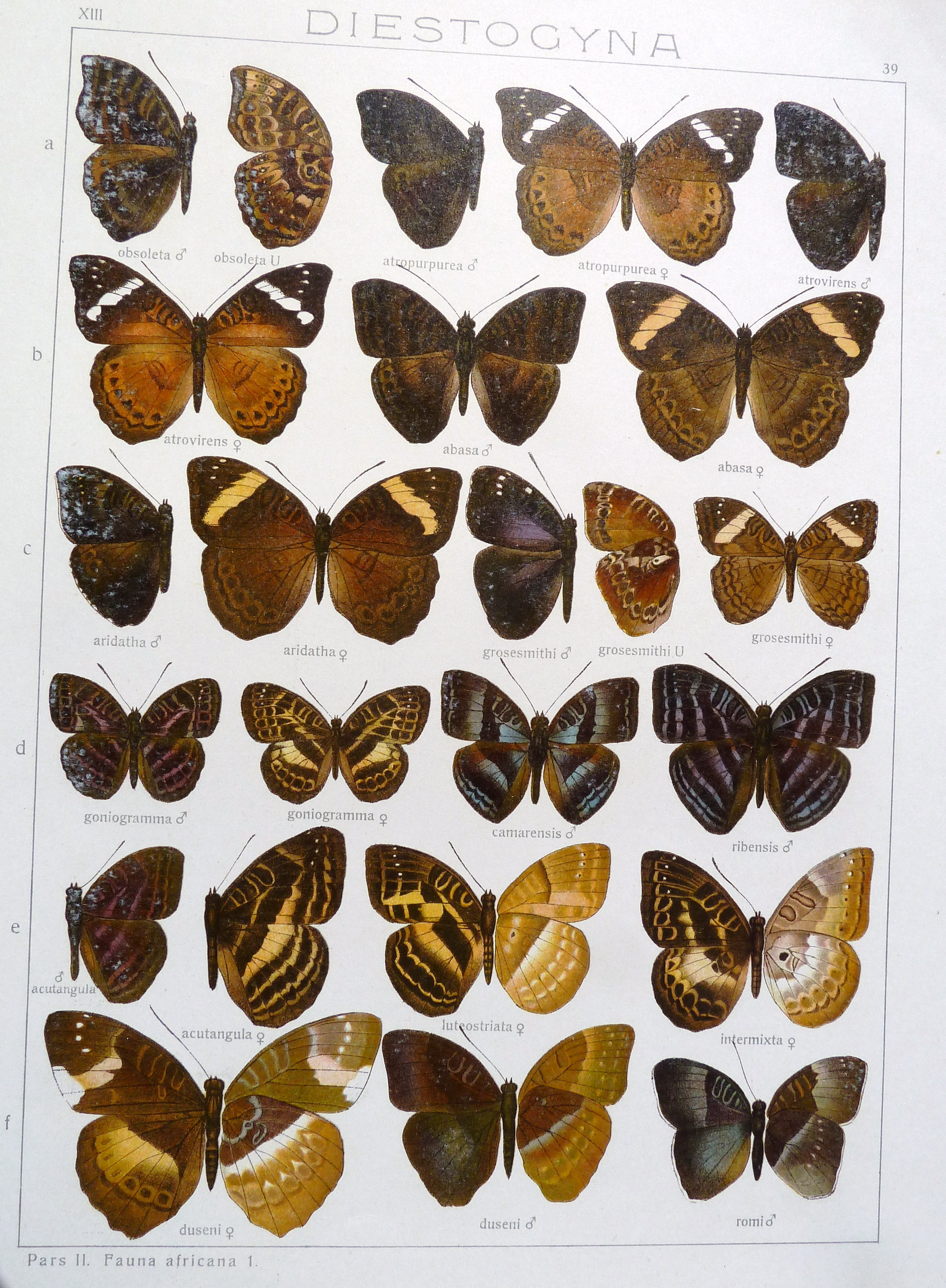
- In Adalbert Seitz's Fauna Africana

Scientific classification
- Kingdom: Animalia
- Phylum: Arthropoda
- Clade: Pancrustacea
- Class: Insecta
- Order: Lepidoptera
- Family: Nymphalidae
- Genus: Euriphene
- Species: E. romi

Binomial name
- Euriphene romi (Aurivillius, 1898)

Synonyms
- Diestogyna romi Aurivillius, 1898; Euriphene (Euriphene) romi

= Euriphene romi =

Species of butterfly

Euriphene romi is a butterfly in the family Nymphalidae. It is found in the Democratic Republic of the Congo.
