= Euriphene paralysandra =

Scientific classification
- Domain: Eukaryota
- Kingdom: Animalia
- Phylum: Arthropoda
- Class: Insecta
- Order: Lepidoptera
- Family: Nymphalidae
- Genus: Euriphene
- Species: E. paralysandra

Binomial name
- Euriphene paralysandra d'Abrera, 2004

Synonyms
- Euriphene (Doricleana) paralysandra

Species of butterfly

Euriphene paralysandra, or D'Abrera's Lysandra nymph, is a butterfly in the family Nymphalidae. It is found in southeastern Nigeria, Cameroon, and Gabon. The habitat consists of forests.
