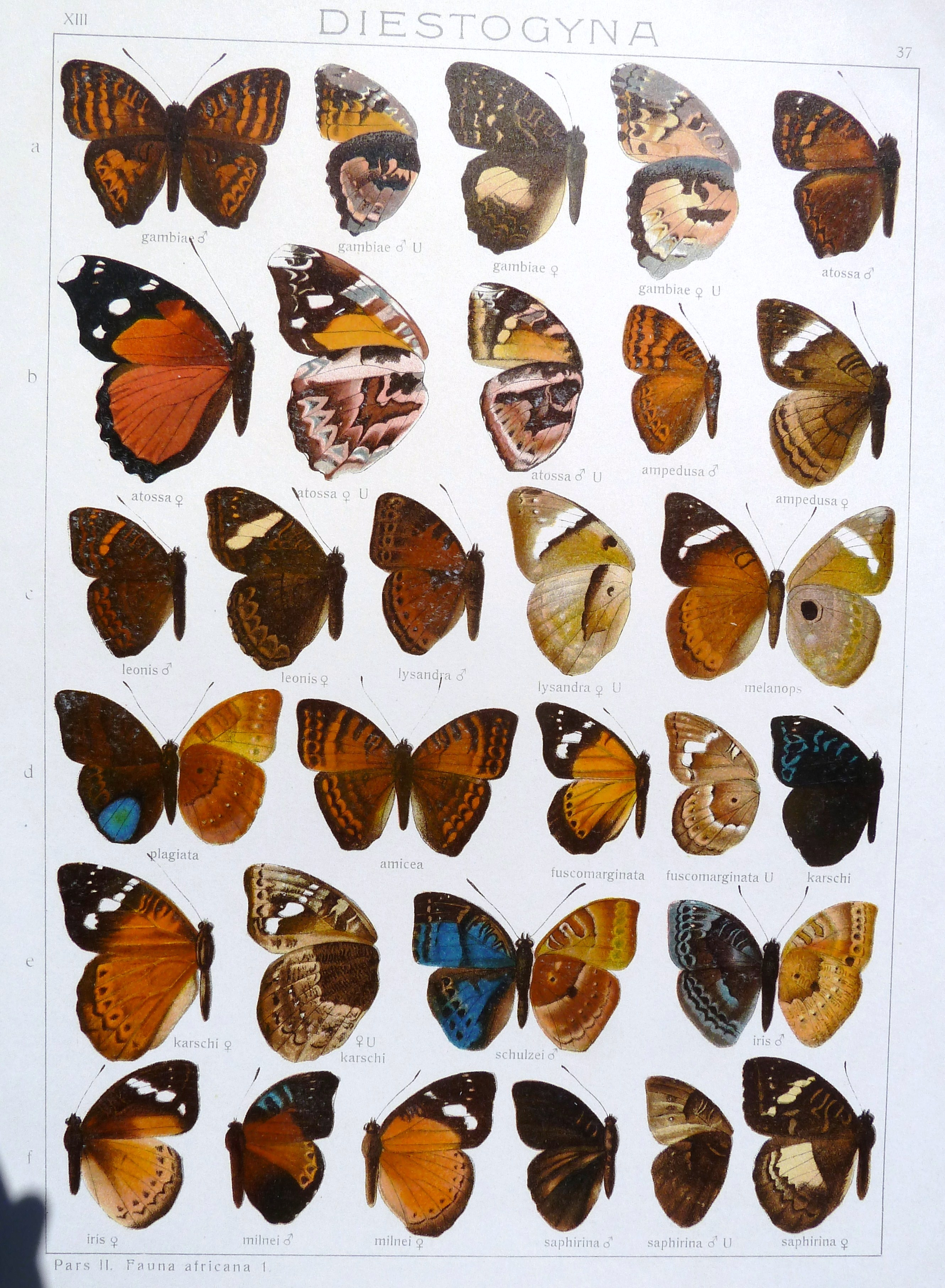
- In Adalbert Seitz's Fauna Africana

Scientific classification
- Domain: Eukaryota
- Kingdom: Animalia
- Phylum: Arthropoda
- Class: Insecta
- Order: Lepidoptera
- Family: Nymphalidae
- Genus: Euriphene
- Species: E. melanops

Binomial name
- Euriphene melanops (Aurivillius, 1898)

Synonyms
- Diestogyna melanops Aurivillius, 1898; Euriphene (Doricleana) melanops

= Euriphene melanops =

Species of butterfly

Euriphene melanops, also known as the black-spot nymph, is a butterfly in the family Nymphalidae. It is found in the Republic of the Congo and the Democratic Republic of the Congo (Mai-Ndombe, Uele, Kivu).
