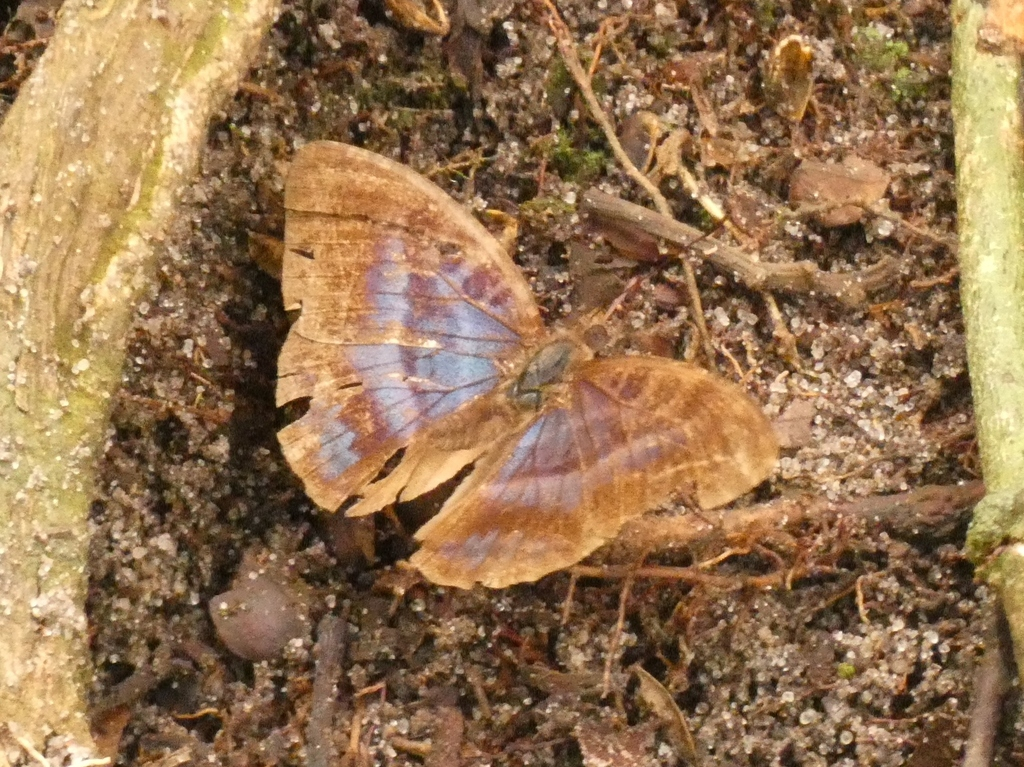

Scientific classification
- Kingdom: Animalia
- Phylum: Arthropoda
- Class: Insecta
- Order: Lepidoptera
- Family: Nymphalidae
- Genus: Euriphene
- Species: E. mundula

Binomial name
- Euriphene mundula (Grünberg, 1910)

Synonyms
- Diestogyna mundula Grünberg, 1910; Euriphene (Euriphene) mundula

= Euriphene mundula =

Species of butterfly

Euriphene mundula, the bright nymph, is a butterfly in the family Nymphalidae. It is found in eastern Nigeria, Cameroon, Bioko, Gabon and the Republic of the Congo. The habitat consists of forests.

Adults are attracted to fermented fruit.
