= Euriphene minkoi =

Scientific classification
- Kingdom: Animalia
- Phylum: Arthropoda
- Clade: Pancrustacea
- Class: Insecta
- Order: Lepidoptera
- Family: Nymphalidae
- Genus: Euriphene
- Species: E. minkoi

Binomial name
- Euriphene minkoi Bernardi, 1993

Synonyms
- Euriphene duseni minkoi Bernardi, 1993; Euriphene (Euriphene) minkoi

Species of butterfly

Euriphene minkoi is a butterfly in the family Nymphalidae. It is found in Gabon and Cameroon.

== Subspecies ==
- Euriphene minkoi minkoi (Gabon)
- Euriphene minkoi collinsi Hecq, 1994 (Cameroon)
