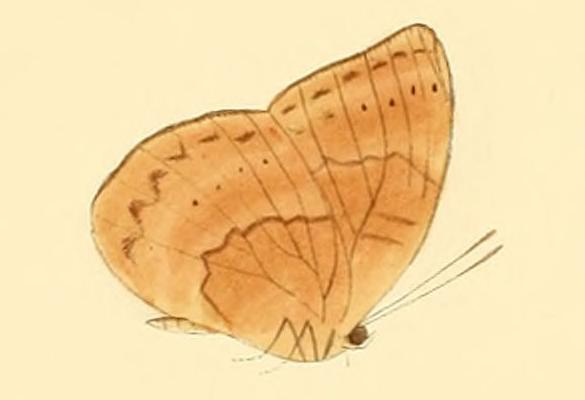

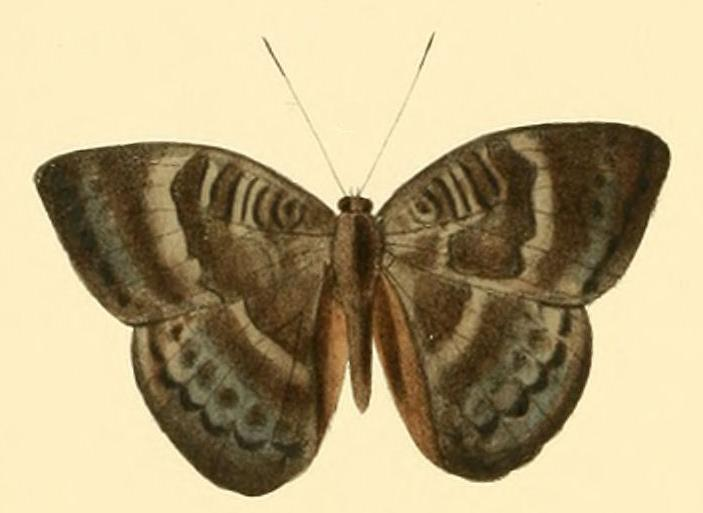

Scientific classification
- Kingdom: Animalia
- Phylum: Arthropoda
- Clade: Pancrustacea
- Class: Insecta
- Order: Lepidoptera
- Family: Nymphalidae
- Genus: Euriphene
- Species: E. tadema

Binomial name
- Euriphene tadema (Hewitson, 1866)

Synonyms
- Aterica tadema Hewitson, 1866; Euriphene (Euriphene) tadema; Diestogina tadema var. caerulescens Neustetter, 1916; Diestogyna nigropunctata Aurivillius, 1901; Euriphene nigropunctata

= Euriphene tadema =

Species of butterfly

Euriphene tadema, the straw nymph, is a butterfly in the family Nymphalidae. It is found in Nigeria, Cameroon, Equatorial Guinea, Gabon, the Democratic Republic of the Congo, Uganda and Tanzania. The habitat consists of forests and secondary habitats.

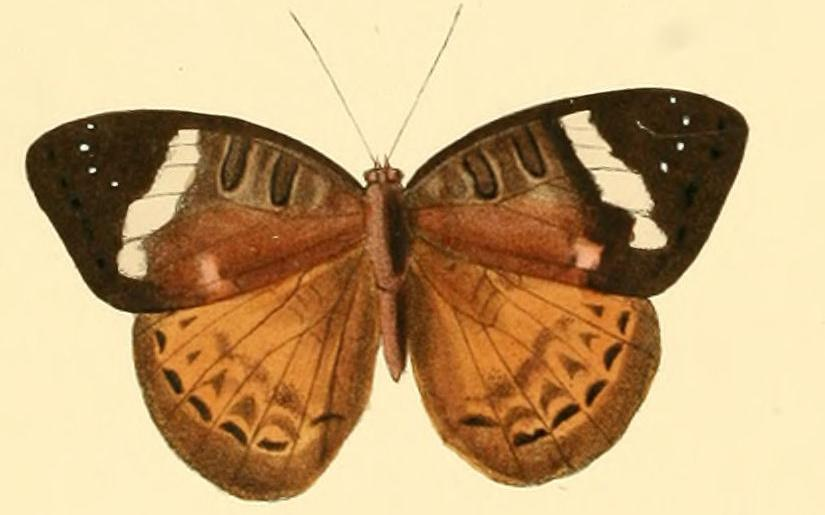

== Subspecies ==
- Euriphene tadema tadema (southern Nigeria, Cameroon, Bioko, Gabon, Democratic Republic of the Congo)
- Euriphene tadema nigropunctata (Aurivillius, 1901) (Uganda, north-western Tanzania, Democratic Republic of the Congo: Mongala, Uele, north Kivu, Tshopo, Equateur, Sankuru, Lualaba)
