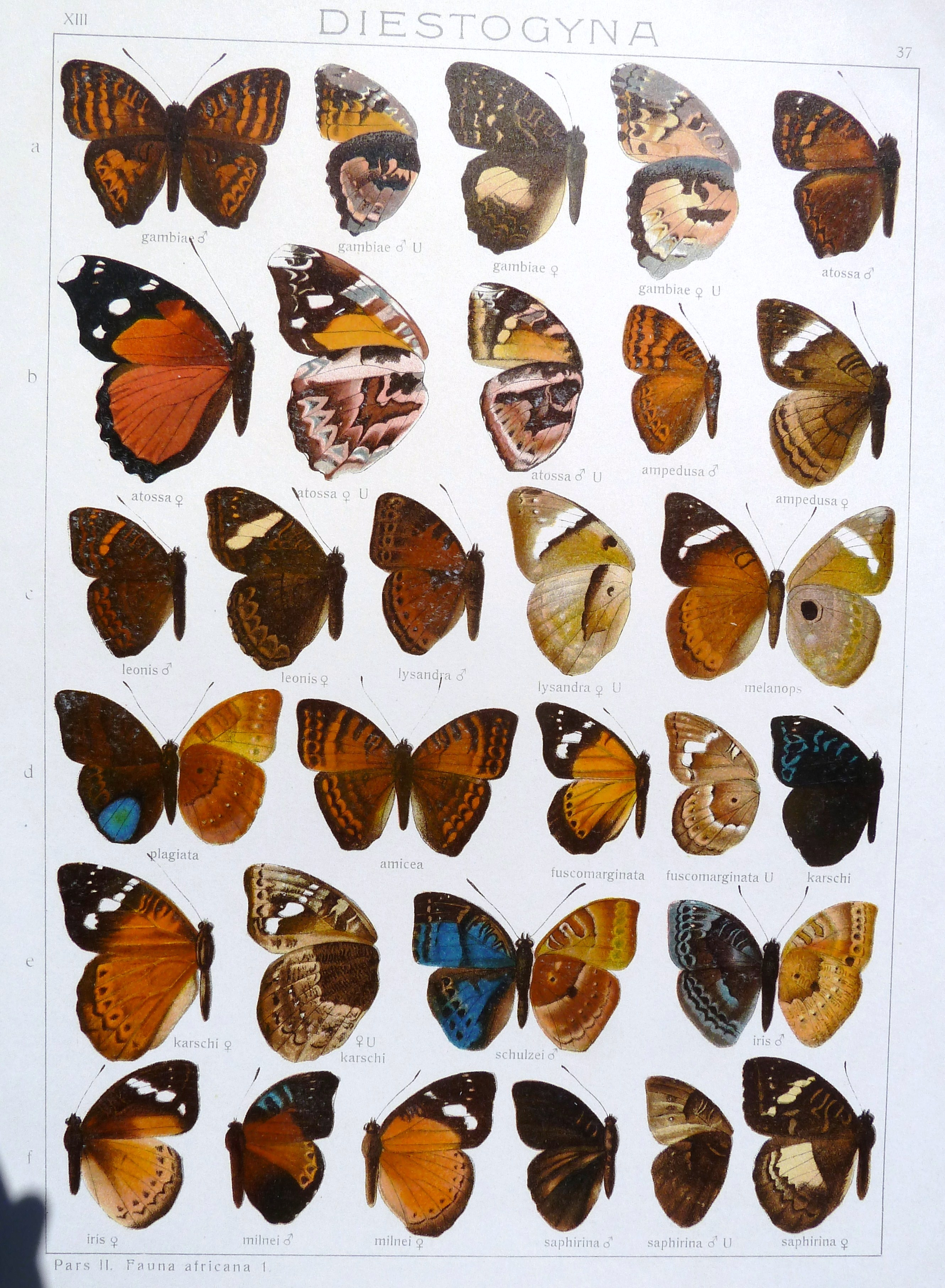
- In Adalbert Seitz's Fauna Africana

Scientific classification
- Domain: Eukaryota
- Kingdom: Animalia
- Phylum: Arthropoda
- Class: Insecta
- Order: Lepidoptera
- Family: Nymphalidae
- Genus: Euriphene
- Species: E. iris

Binomial name
- Euriphene iris (Aurivillius, 1903)

Synonyms
- Diestogyna iris Aurivillius, 1903; Euriphene (Euriphene) iris

= Euriphene iris =

Species of butterfly

Euriphene iris is a butterfly in the family Nymphalidae. It is found in the Democratic Republic of the Congo (Shaba), Tanzania, northern Zambia and Angola. The habitat consists of miombo woodland.
