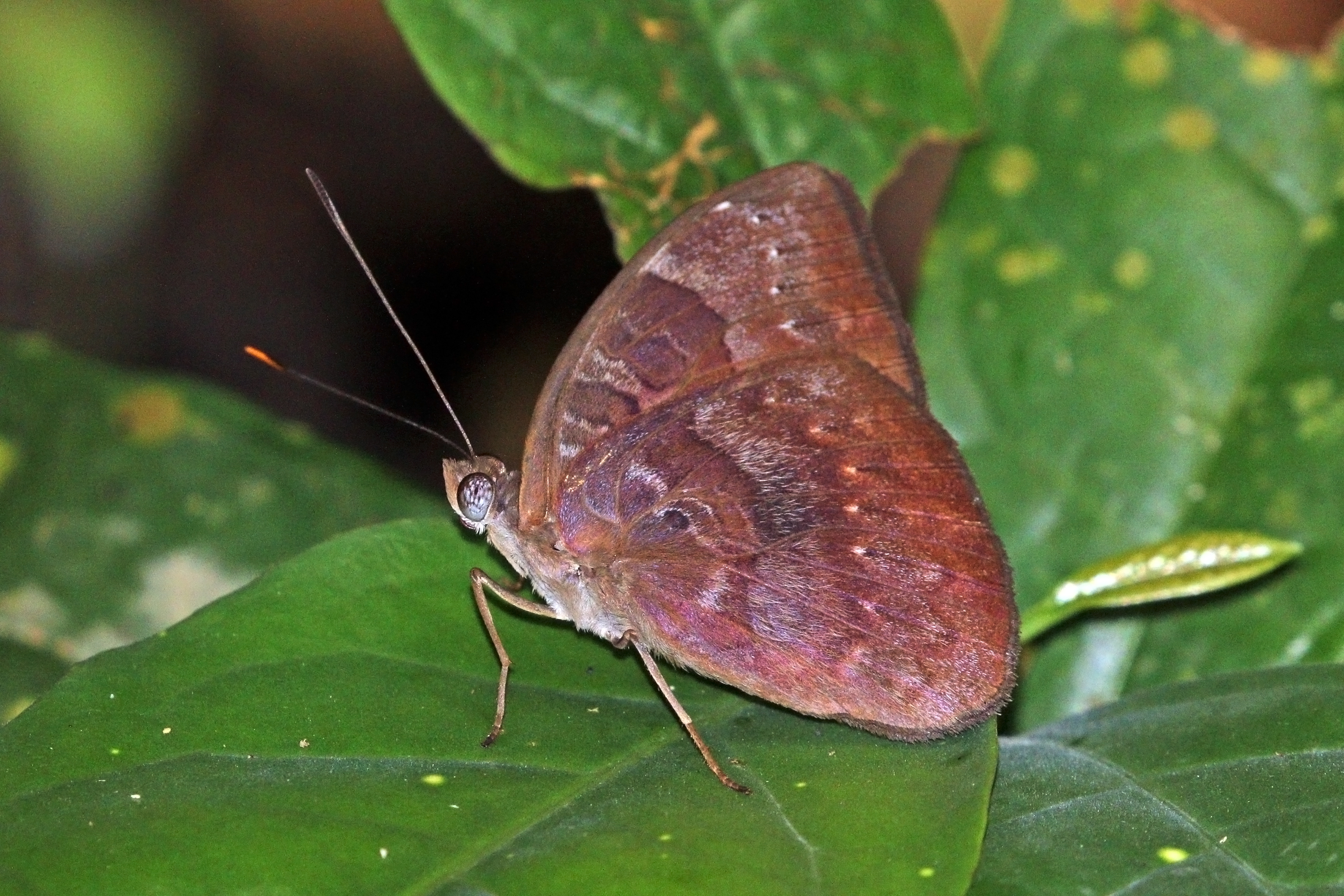
- Male in Ghana

Scientific classification
- Kingdom: Animalia
- Phylum: Arthropoda
- Clade: Pancrustacea
- Class: Insecta
- Order: Lepidoptera
- Family: Nymphalidae
- Genus: Euriphene
- Species: E. coerulea

Binomial name
- Euriphene coerulea Boisduval, 1847

Synonyms
- Aterica felicia Butler, 1871; Euriphene (Euriphene) coerulea

= Euriphene coerulea =

Species of butterfly

Euriphene coerulea, the western nymph, is a butterfly in the family Nymphalidae. It is found in Guinea, Sierra Leone, Liberia, Ivory Coast, western Ghana and western Nigeria. The habitat consists of forests.

Torben Larsen developed a species numbering system for his 2005 publication Butterflies of West Africa. This species is #978. The 'Larsen' numbers have since been used with permission in A Sharp Eye on Butterflies of Ghana.
