= Euriphene fouassini =

Scientific classification
- Kingdom: Animalia
- Phylum: Arthropoda
- Class: Insecta
- Order: Lepidoptera
- Family: Nymphalidae
- Genus: Euriphene
- Species: E. fouassini

Binomial name
- Euriphene fouassini Hecq, 1994

Synonyms
- Euriphene (Euriphene) fouassini

Species of butterfly

Euriphene fouassini is a butterfly in the family Nymphalidae. It is found in the Democratic Republic of the Congo.
