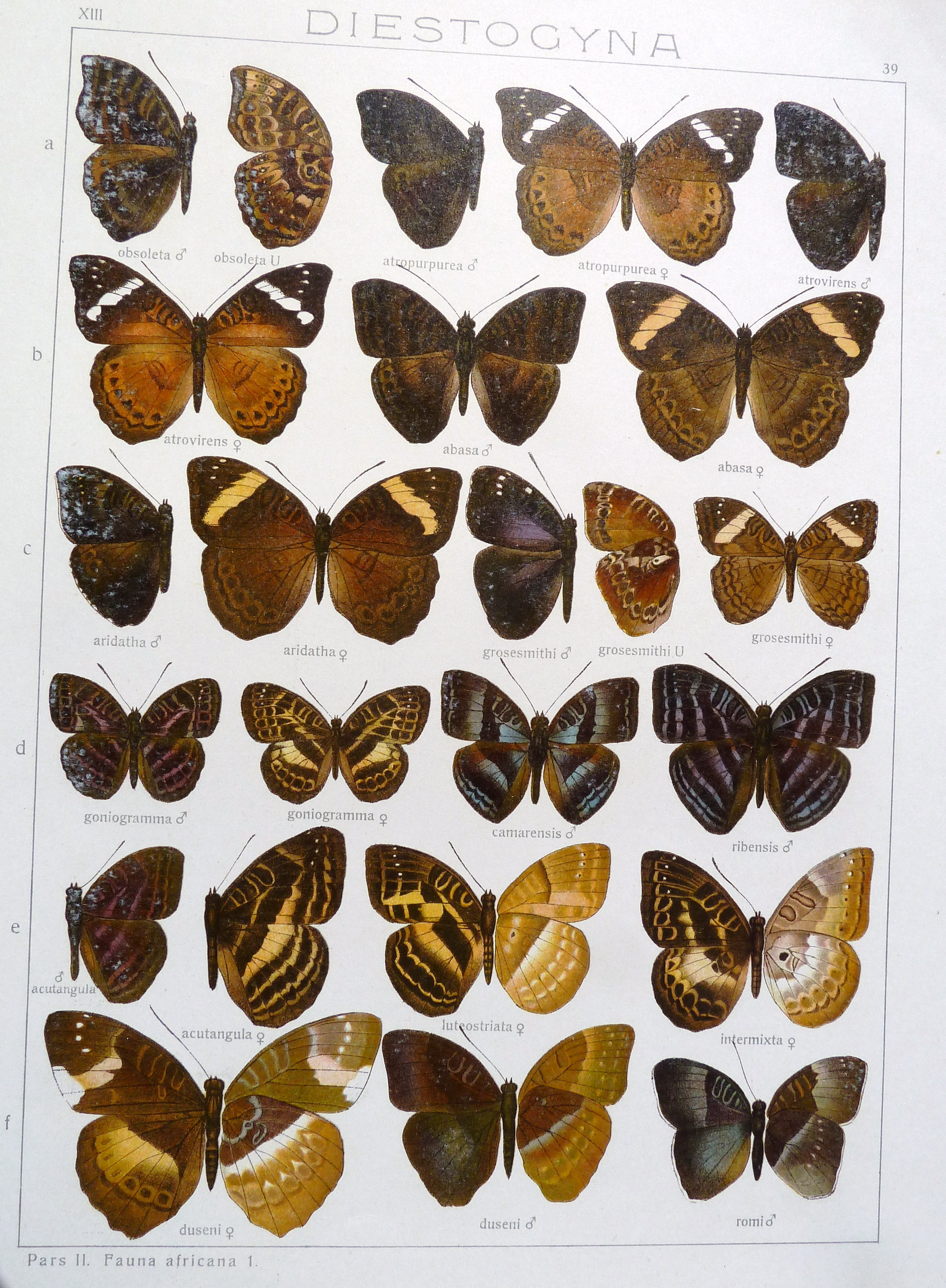
- In Adalbert Seitz's Fauna Africana

Scientific classification
- Domain: Eukaryota
- Kingdom: Animalia
- Phylum: Arthropoda
- Class: Insecta
- Order: Lepidoptera
- Family: Nymphalidae
- Genus: Euriphene
- Species: E. ribensis

Binomial name
- Euriphene ribensis (Ward, 1871)

Synonyms
- Euryphene ribensis Ward, 1871; Euriphene (Euriphene) ribensis; Diestogyna acutangula Aurivillius, 1909

= Euriphene ribensis =

Species of butterfly

Euriphene ribensis is a butterfly in the family Nymphalidae. It is found in the Democratic Republic of the Congo (Uele, north Kivu, Sankuru and Lualaba), Uganda, western Kenya and north-western Tanzania. The habitat consists of forests.

The larvae feed on Bersama abyssinica.
