= Euriphene anaxibia =

Scientific classification
- Domain: Eukaryota
- Kingdom: Animalia
- Phylum: Arthropoda
- Class: Insecta
- Order: Lepidoptera
- Family: Nymphalidae
- Genus: Euriphene
- Species: E. anaxibia

Binomial name
- Euriphene anaxibia Hecq, 1997

Synonyms
- Euriphene (Euriphene) anaxibia

Species of butterfly

Euriphene anaxibia, the Helios nymph, is a butterfly in the family Nymphalidae. It is found in Nigeria and Cameroon. The habitat consists of forests.
