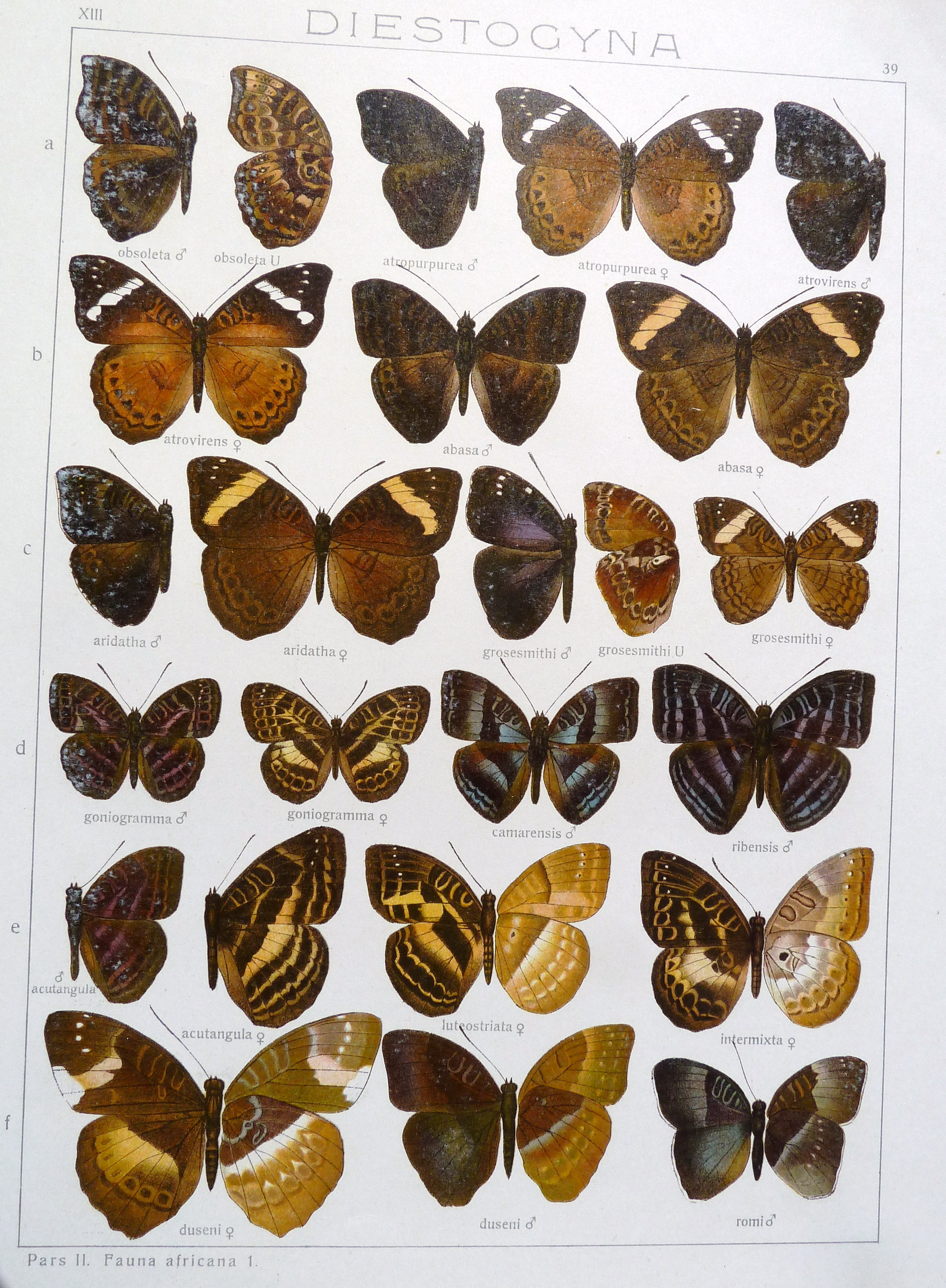
- In Adalbert Seitz's Fauna Africana

Scientific classification
- Kingdom: Animalia
- Phylum: Arthropoda
- Class: Insecta
- Order: Lepidoptera
- Family: Nymphalidae
- Genus: Euriphene
- Species: E. abasa

Binomial name
- Euriphene abasa (Hewitson, 1866)

Synonyms
- Aterica abasa Hewitson, 1866; Euriphene (Euriphene) abasa; Aterica sjoestedti Aurivillius, 1893; Aterica fuliginosa Holland, 1893

= Euriphene abasa =

Species of butterfly

Euriphene abasa, the black nymph, is a butterfly in the family Nymphalidae. It is found in eastern Nigeria, Cameroon, Gabon, the Republic of the Congo and the Democratic Republic of the Congo (Équateur). The habitat consists of wet forests.
