= Euriphene pallidior =

Scientific classification
- Domain: Eukaryota
- Kingdom: Animalia
- Phylum: Arthropoda
- Class: Insecta
- Order: Lepidoptera
- Family: Nymphalidae
- Genus: Euriphene
- Species: E. pallidior

Binomial name
- Euriphene pallidior (Hulstaert, 1924)

Synonyms
- Diestogyna cyriaca pallidior Hulstaert, 1924; Euriphene (Euriphene) pallidior

Species of butterfly

Euriphene pallidior is a butterfly in the family Nymphalidae. It is found in the Democratic Republic of the Congo and Zambia.
