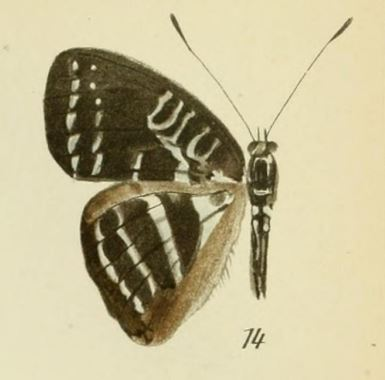

Scientific classification
- Kingdom: Animalia
- Phylum: Arthropoda
- Class: Insecta
- Order: Lepidoptera
- Family: Nymphalidae
- Genus: Euriphene
- Species: E. tessmanniana

Binomial name
- Euriphene tessmanniana (Bryk, 1915)

Synonyms
- Diestogyna tessmanniana Bryk, 1915; Diestogyna tessmanni Bryk, 1915; Euriphene (Euriphene) tessmanniana

= Euriphene tessmanniana =

Species of butterfly

Euriphene tessmanniana is a butterfly in the family Nymphalidae. It is found in Cameroon.
