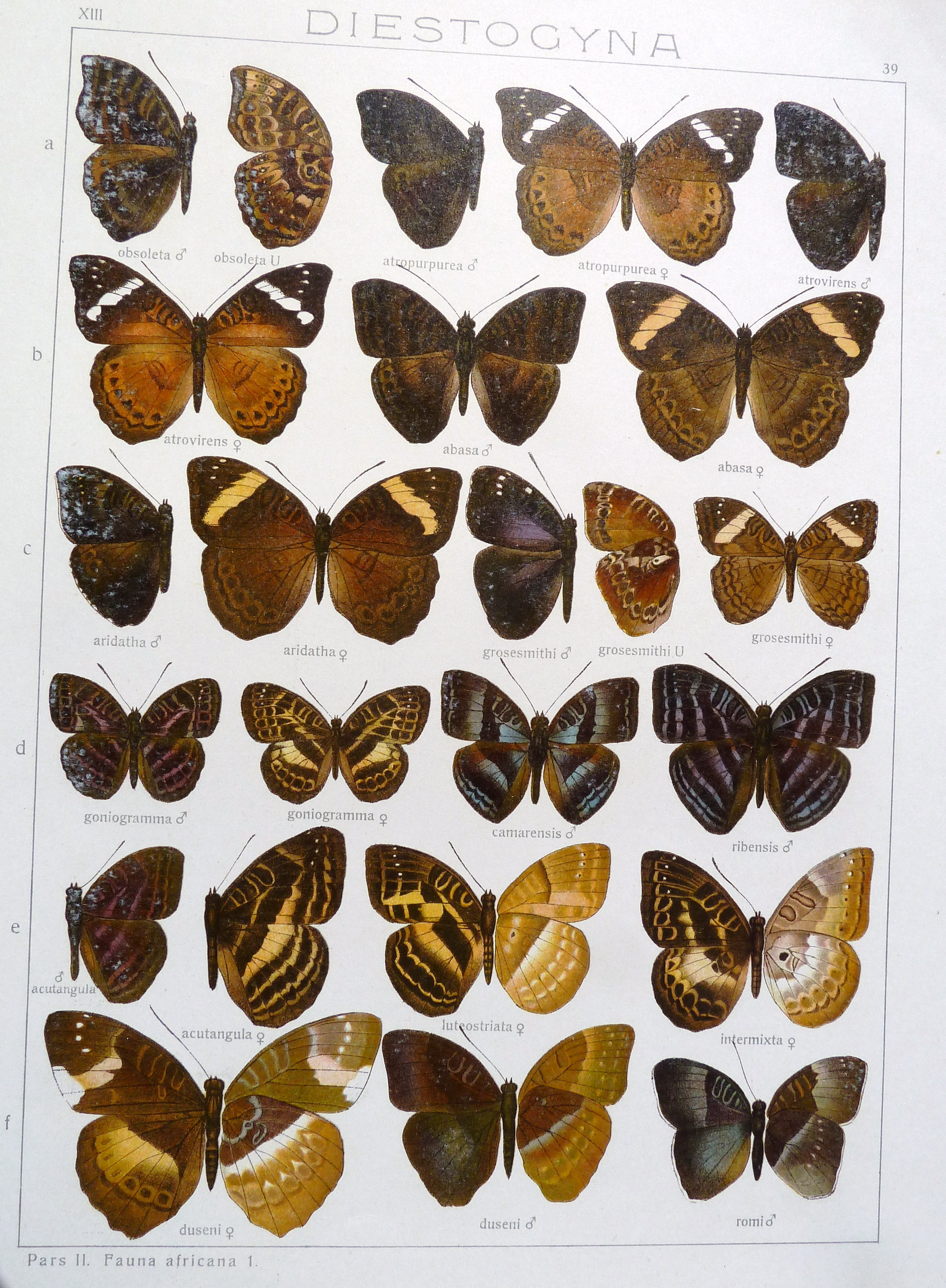
- In Adalbert Seitz's Fauna Africana

Scientific classification
- Domain: Eukaryota
- Kingdom: Animalia
- Phylum: Arthropoda
- Class: Insecta
- Order: Lepidoptera
- Family: Nymphalidae
- Genus: Euriphene
- Species: E. obsoleta

Binomial name
- Euriphene obsoleta (Grünberg, 1908)

Synonyms
- Diestogyna obsoleta Grünberg, 1908; Euriphene (Euriphene) obsoleta

= Euriphene obsoleta =

Species of butterfly

Euriphene obsoleta is a butterfly in the family Nymphalidae. It is found in Cameroon, the Democratic Republic of the Congo, Uganda and Tanzania. The habitat consists of forests.

The larvae possibly feed on Combretum species.

== Subspecies ==
- Euriphene obsoleta obsoleta (Cameroon, Uganda, Democratic Republic of the Congo: Uele, Kivu)
- Euriphene obsoleta munene Hecq, 1994 (north-western Tanzania)
