= Euriphene ituriensis =

Scientific classification
- Kingdom: Animalia
- Phylum: Arthropoda
- Class: Insecta
- Order: Lepidoptera
- Family: Nymphalidae
- Genus: Euriphene
- Species: E. ituriensis

Binomial name
- Euriphene ituriensis (Jackson & Howarth, 1957)

Synonyms
- Diestogyna ituriensis Jackson and Howarth, 1957; Euriphene (Euriphene) ituriensis

Species of butterfly

Euriphene ituriensis is a butterfly in the family Nymphalidae. It is found in the Democratic Republic of the Congo (northern Kivu and Ituri).
