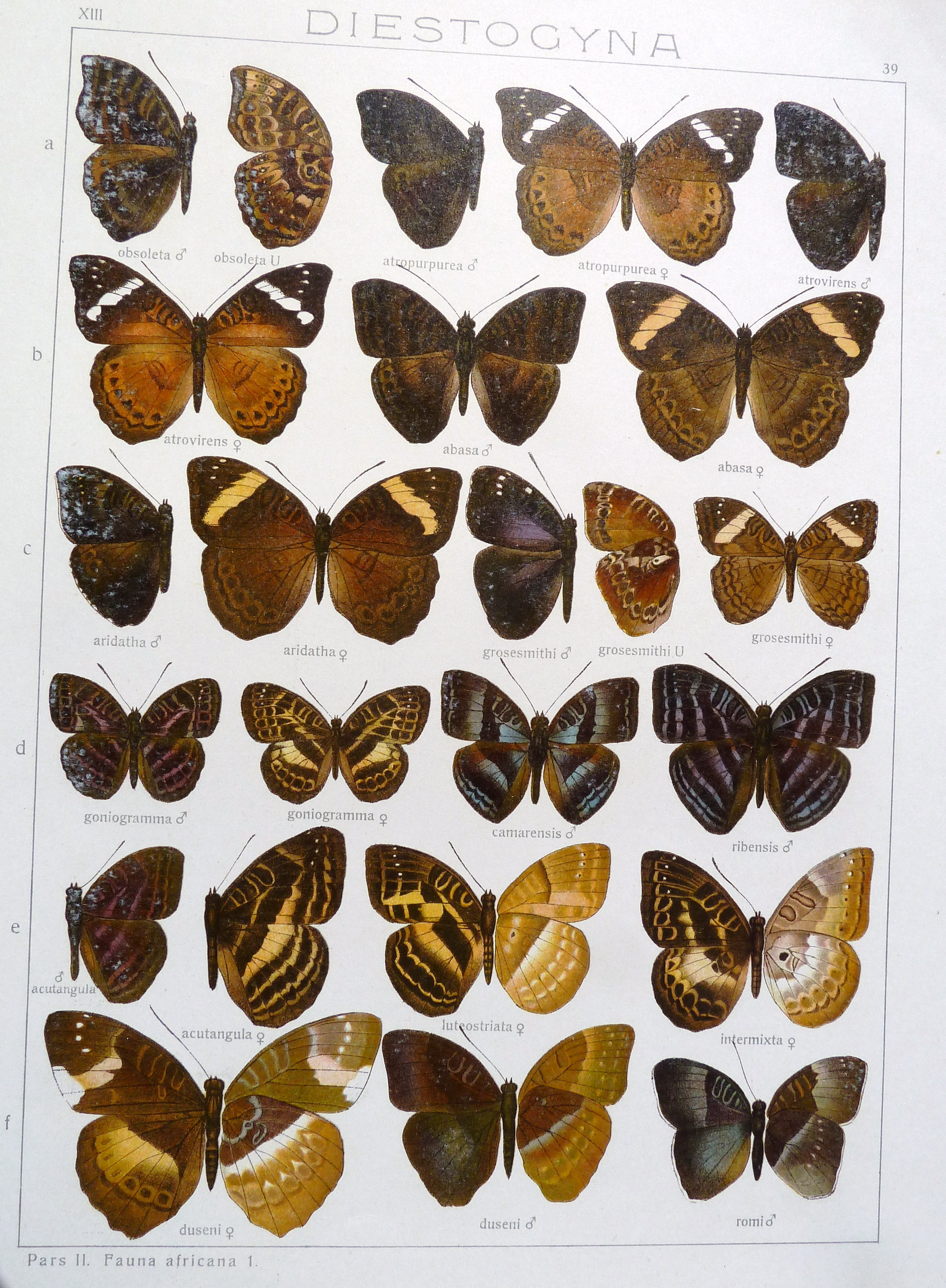
- In Adalbert Seitz's Fauna Africana

Scientific classification
- Kingdom: Animalia
- Phylum: Arthropoda
- Class: Insecta
- Order: Lepidoptera
- Family: Nymphalidae
- Genus: Euriphene
- Species: E. atropurpurea

Binomial name
- Euriphene atropurpurea (Aurivillius, 1894)

Synonyms
- Diestogyna atropurpurea Aurivillius, 1894; Euriphene (Euriphene) atropurpurea

= Euriphene atropurpurea =

Species of butterfly

Euriphene atropurpurea, or Aurivillius' nymph, is a butterfly in the family Nymphalidae. It is found in Nigeria, Cameroon, Gabon and the Republic of the Congo. The habitat consists of forests.
