= Euriphene bernaudi =

Scientific classification
- Domain: Eukaryota
- Kingdom: Animalia
- Phylum: Arthropoda
- Class: Insecta
- Order: Lepidoptera
- Family: Nymphalidae
- Genus: Euriphene
- Species: E. bernaudi

Binomial name
- Euriphene bernaudi Hecq, 1994

Synonyms
- Euriphene simplex bernaudi Hecq, 1994; Euriphene (Euriphene) bernaudi

Species of butterfly

Euriphene bernaudi, or Bernaud's nymph, is a butterfly in the family Nymphalidae. It is found in Nigeria and Cameroon. The habitat consists of sub-montane forests.
