= Euriphene core =

Scientific classification
- Kingdom: Animalia
- Phylum: Arthropoda
- Class: Insecta
- Order: Lepidoptera
- Family: Nymphalidae
- Genus: Euriphene
- Species: E. core

Binomial name
- Euriphene core Hecq, 1994

Synonyms
- Euriphene (Euriphene) core

Species of butterfly

Euriphene core is a butterfly in the family Nymphalidae. It is found in the Democratic Republic of the Congo.
