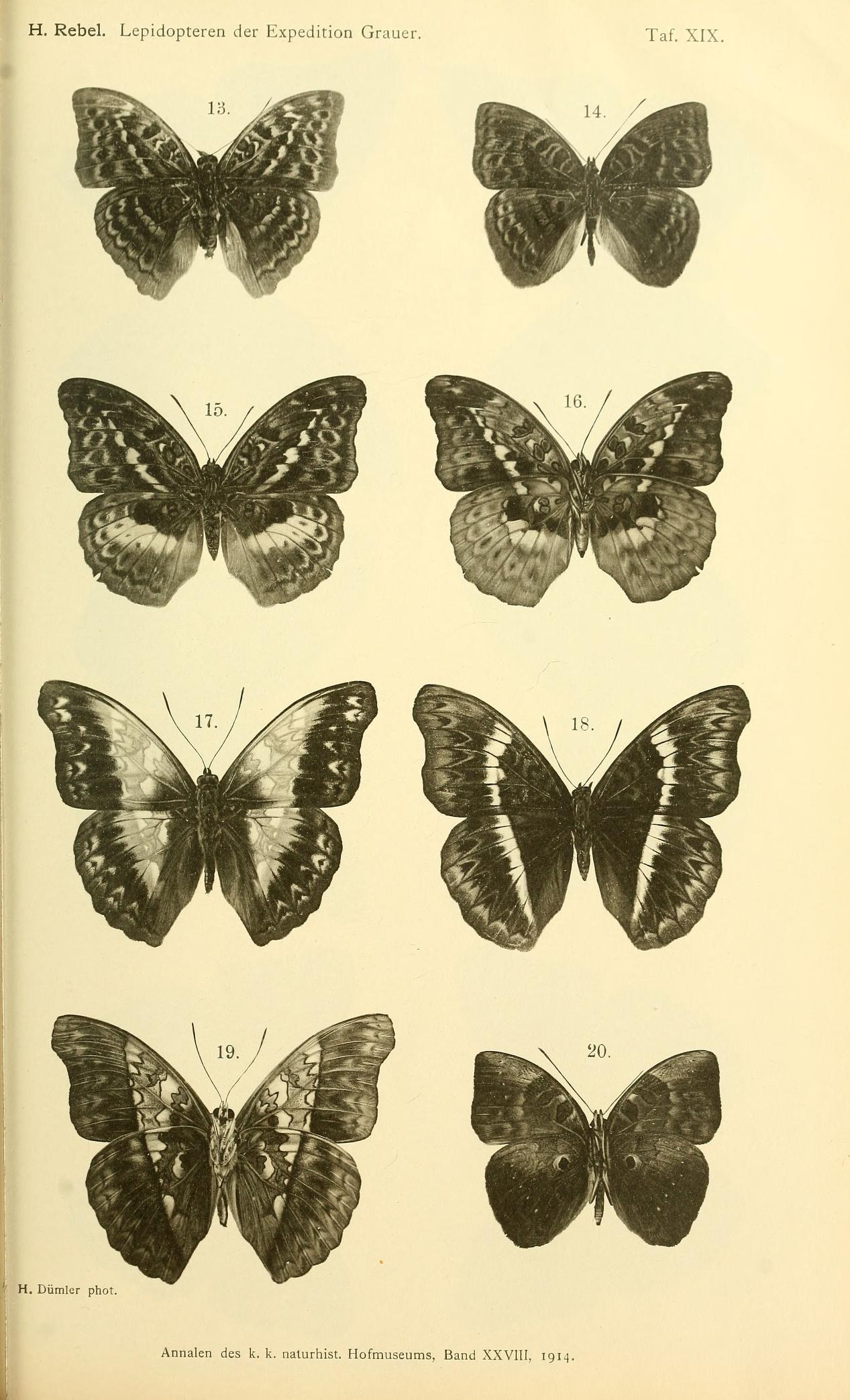
- Figure 14

Scientific classification
- Kingdom: Animalia
- Phylum: Arthropoda
- Class: Insecta
- Order: Lepidoptera
- Family: Nymphalidae
- Genus: Euriphene
- Species: E. intermixta

Binomial name
- Euriphene intermixta (Aurivillius, 1904)

Synonyms
- Diestogyna intermixta Aurivillius, 1904; Euriphene (Euriphene) intermixta; Deistogyna unopunctata Bethune-Baker, 1908; Deistogyna unocellata Carpenter and Jackson, 1950

= Euriphene intermixta =

Species of butterfly

Euriphene intermixta is a butterfly in the family Nymphalidae. It is found in the Democratic Republic of the Congo (Uele, Ituri, north Kivu, Tshopo, Sankuru and Maniema).
