= Euriphene epe =

Scientific classification
- Domain: Eukaryota
- Kingdom: Animalia
- Phylum: Arthropoda
- Class: Insecta
- Order: Lepidoptera
- Family: Nymphalidae
- Genus: Euriphene
- Species: E. epe

Binomial name
- Euriphene epe Pyrcz & Larsen, 2009

Species of butterfly

Euriphene epe is a butterfly in the family Nymphalidae. It is found in western Nigeria. The habitat consists of rainforests.
