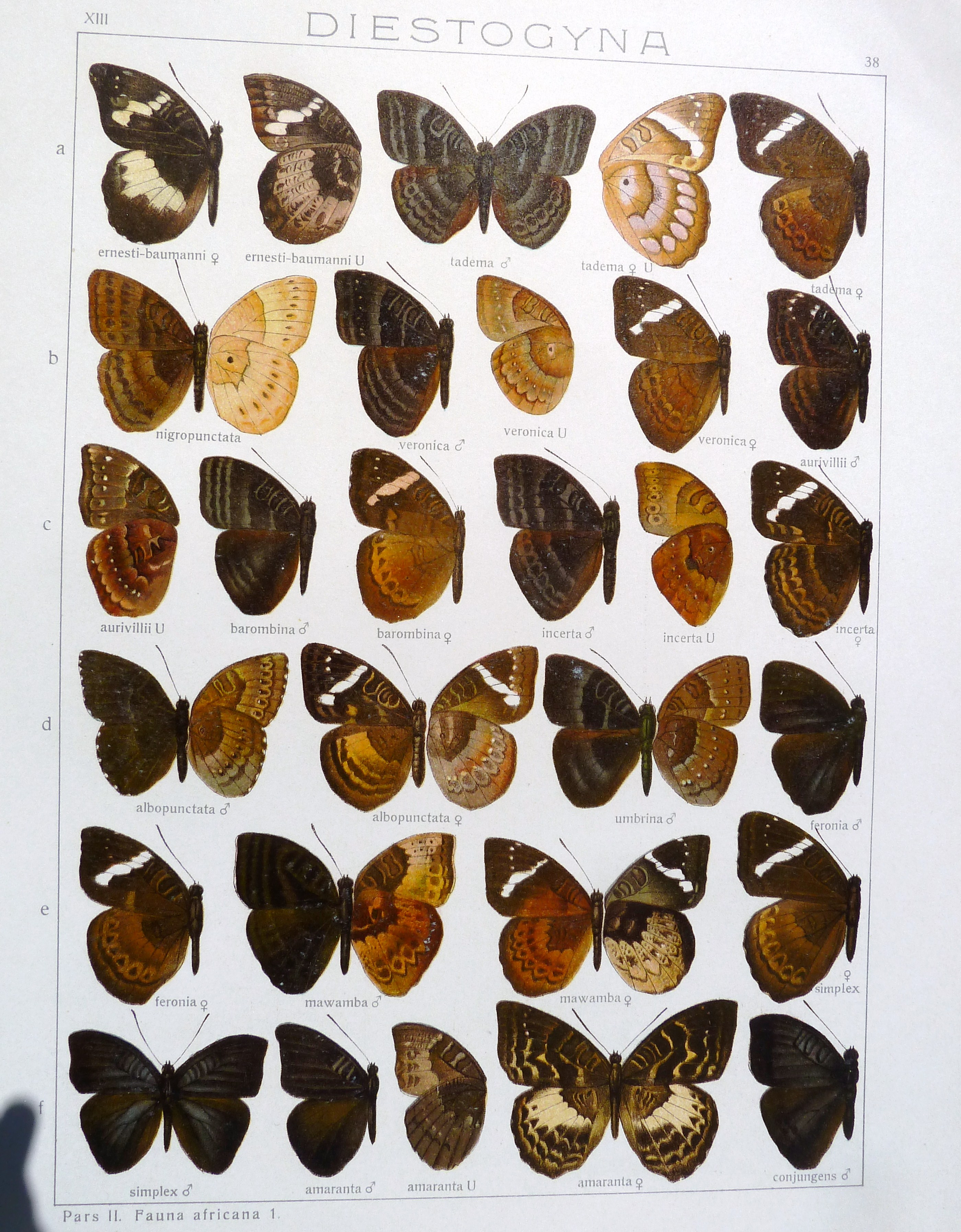
- In Adalbert Seitz's Fauna Africana

Scientific classification
- Kingdom: Animalia
- Phylum: Arthropoda
- Class: Insecta
- Order: Lepidoptera
- Family: Nymphalidae
- Genus: Euriphene
- Species: E. aurivillii

Binomial name
- Euriphene aurivillii (Bartel, 1905)

Synonyms
- Diestogyna aurivillii Bartel, 1905; Euriphene (Euriphene) aurivillii

= Euriphene aurivillii =

Species of butterfly

Euriphene aurivillii is a butterfly in the family Nymphalidae. It is found in Cameroon.
