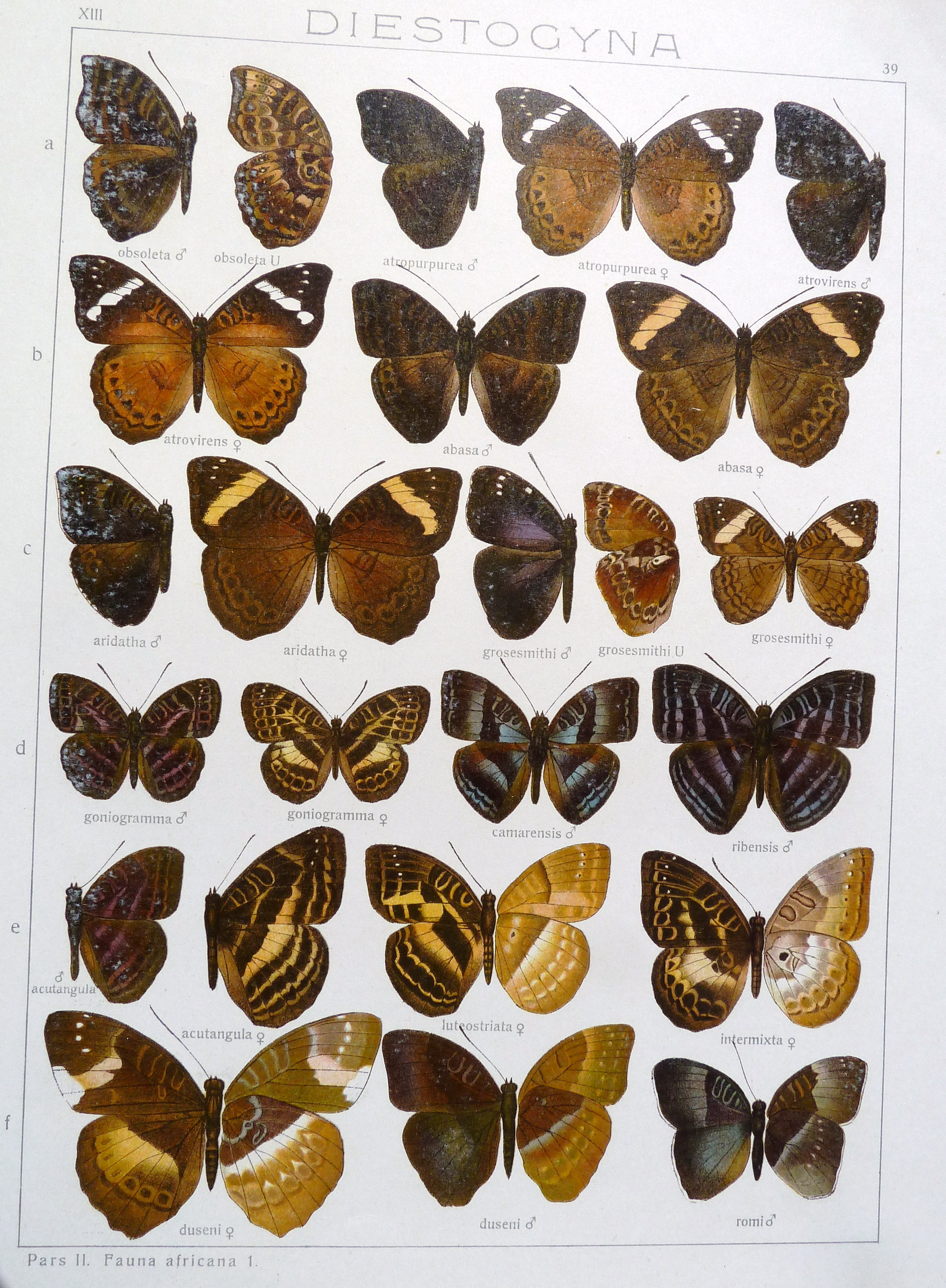
- In Adalbert Seitz's Fauna Africana

Scientific classification
- Domain: Eukaryota
- Kingdom: Animalia
- Phylum: Arthropoda
- Class: Insecta
- Order: Lepidoptera
- Family: Nymphalidae
- Genus: Euriphene
- Species: E. goniogramma

Binomial name
- Euriphene goniogramma (Karsch, 1894)

Synonyms
- Diestogyna goniogramma Karsch, 1894; Euriphene (Euriphene) goniogramma

= Euriphene goniogramma =

Species of butterfly

Euriphene goniogramma, also known as the littlest nymph, is a butterfly in the family Nymphalidae. It is found in Nigeria, Cameroon, Gabon, and the Democratic Republic of the Congo (from the north to Ubangi, Mongala, Uele, Ituri and northern Kivu). It inhabits forests. The larvae feed on Combretum species.
