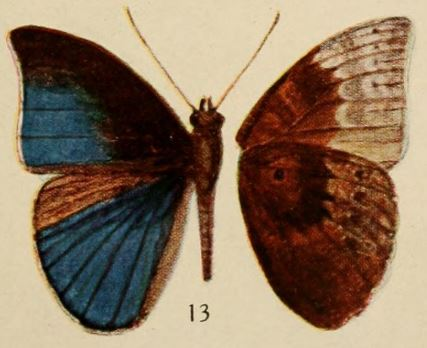
- Euriphene kahli

Scientific classification
- Kingdom: Animalia
- Phylum: Arthropoda
- Class: Insecta
- Order: Lepidoptera
- Family: Nymphalidae
- Tribe: Adoliadini
- Genus: Euriphene; Boisduval, 1847

Synonyms
- Diestogyna Karsch, 1893; Radia Hecq, 1976; Doricleana Hecq, 1994; Euriphenaria Hecq, 1994

= Euriphene =

Genus of brush-footed butterflies

Euriphene is a butterfly genus in the subfamily Limenitidinae. The 70 or so member species are confined to the Afrotropical realm. They are found mainly in the Guinean Forests of West Africa and the Congolian forests.

== Description ==
Euriphene species resemble Bebearia. The upperside ground colour of the males of some species is grey overlain with a metallic steely-blue sheen (E. barombina, E. coerulea and E. veronica). In other species the ground colour is reddish brown (E. lysandra and E. gambiae). All the species have distinctive dark bars in the forewing cell and suffused dark markings on the rest of the wings. Many have an apical arc of small white spots. The head is wide with long, erect palpi. The antennae are very long, with a gradually-formed, robust club. The thorax is robust and woolly. The wing characters are forewings moderately large; costa very much arched; apex rather acute; hind-margin nearly straight. Hindwings sub-oval; hindmargin entire, or not strongly scalloped. The abdomen is rather small.

== Taxonomy ==
The type species of the genus is Aterica tadema Hewitson.

== Species ==
Listed alphabetically within species groups:

- Subgenus Doricleana Hecq, 1994
  - Euriphene doriclea (Drury, 1782)
  - Euriphene lysandra (Stoll, [1790])
  - Euriphene melanops (Aurivillius, 1898)
  - Euriphene paralysandra d'Abrera, 2004
- Subgenus Euriphenaria Hecq, 1994
  - The goniogramma species group
    - Euriphene batesana Bethune-Baker, 1926
    - Euriphene butleri (Aurivillius, 1904)
    - Euriphene camarensis (Ward, 1871)
    - Euriphene goniogramma (Karsch, 1894)
    - Euriphene ituriensis (Jackson & Howarth, 1957)
    - Euriphene luteostriata (Bethune-Baker, 1908)
    - Euriphene mundula (Grünberg, 1910)
    - Euriphene obtusangula (Aurivillius, 1912)
    - Euriphene pinkieana Bernardi, 1975
    - Euriphene ribensis (Ward, 1871)
    - Euriphene tessmanniana (Bryk, 1915)
  - The duseni species group
    - Euriphene adumbrata (Joicey & Talbot, 1928)
    - Euriphene canui Hecq, 1987
    - Euriphene duseni (Aurivillius, 1893)
    - Euriphene minkoi Bernardi, 1993
  - The atossa species group
    - Euriphene ampedusa (Hewitson, 1866)
    - Euriphene atossa (Hewitson, 1865)
    - Euriphene leonis (Aurivillius, 1899)
  - The gambiae species group
    - Euriphene gambiae Feisthamel, 1850
  - The barombina species group
    - Euriphene abasa (Hewitson, 1866)
    - Euriphene alberici (Dufrane, 1945)
    - Euriphene amaranta (Karsch, 1894)
    - Euriphene amicia (Hewitson, 1871)
    - Euriphene amieti Collins & Larsen, 1997
    - Euriphene anaxibia Hecq, 1997
    - Euriphene aridatha (Hewitson, 1866)
    - Euriphene atropurpurea (Aurivillius, 1894)
    - Euriphene atrovirens (Mabille, 1878)
    - Euriphene barombina (Aurivillius, 1894)
    - Euriphene bernaudi Hecq, 1994
    - Euriphene coerulea Boisduval, 1847
    - Euriphene conjungens (Aurivillius, 1909)
    - Euriphene core Hecq, 1994
    - Euriphene ernestibaumanni (Karsch, 1895)
    - Euriphene excelsior (Rebel, 1911)
    - Euriphene fouassini Hecq, 1994
    - Euriphene glaucopis Gaede, 1915
    - Euriphene grosesmithi (Staudinger, 1891)
    - Euriphene hecqui Collins & Larsen, 1997
    - Euriphene incerta (Aurivillius, 1912)
    - Euriphene intermixta (Aurivillius, 1904)
    - Euriphene iris (Aurivillius, 1903)
    - Euriphene jacksoni (Talbot, 1937)
    - Euriphene jolyana Hecq, 1987
    - Euriphene kahli (Holland, 1920)
    - Euriphene karschi (Aurivillius, 1894)
    - Euriphene larseni Hecq, 1994
    - Euriphene lomaensis Belcastro, 1986
    - Euriphene mawamba (Bethune-Baker, 1908)
    - Euriphene milnei (Hewitson, 1865)
    - Euriphene moloukou Hecq, 2002
    - Euriphene monforti Hecq, 1994
    - Euriphene niepelti Neustetter, 1916
    - Euriphene obani Wojtusiak & Knoop, 1994
    - Euriphene obsoleta (Grünberg, 1908)
    - Euriphene pallidior (Hulstaert, 1924)
    - Euriphene pavo (Howarth, 1959)
    - Euriphene plagiata (Aurivillius, 1898)
    - Euriphene rectangula (Schultze, 1920)
    - Euriphene regula Hecq, 1994
    - Euriphene saphirina Karsch, 1894
    - Euriphene schultzei (Aurivillius, 1909)
    - Euriphene simplex (Staudinger, 1891)
    - Euriphene splendida Collins & Larsen, 1997
    - Euriphene tadema (Hewitson, 1866)
    - Euriphene veronica (Stoll, 1780)
  - Unknown species group
    - Euriphene aurivillii (Bartel, 1905)
    - Euriphene epe Pyrcz & Larsen, 2009
    - Euriphene kiki Bernardi & Larsen, 1980
    - Euriphene romi (Aurivillius, 1898)
    - Euriphene rotundata (Holland, 1920)
    - Euriphene taigola Sáfián & Warren-Gash, 2009
