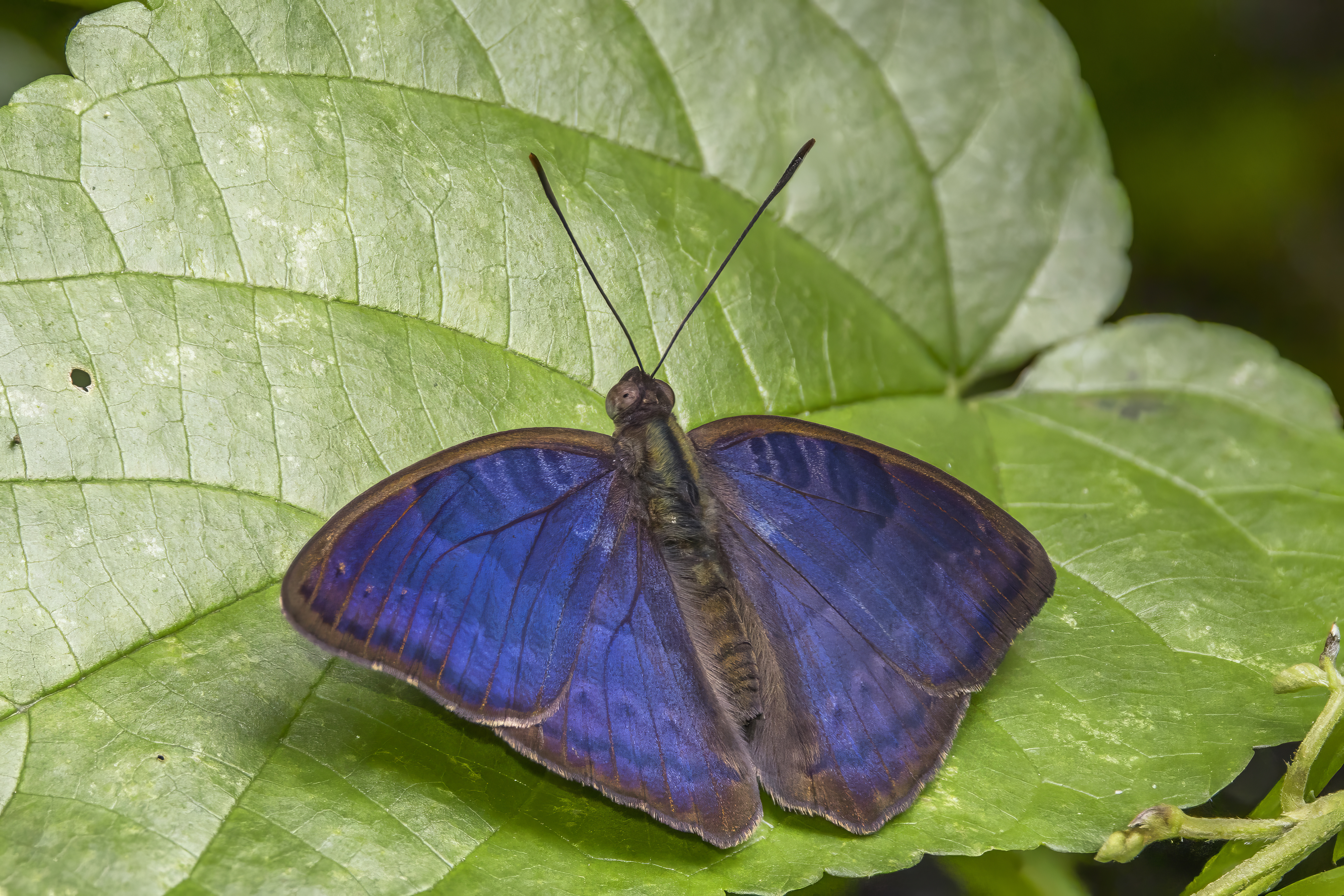

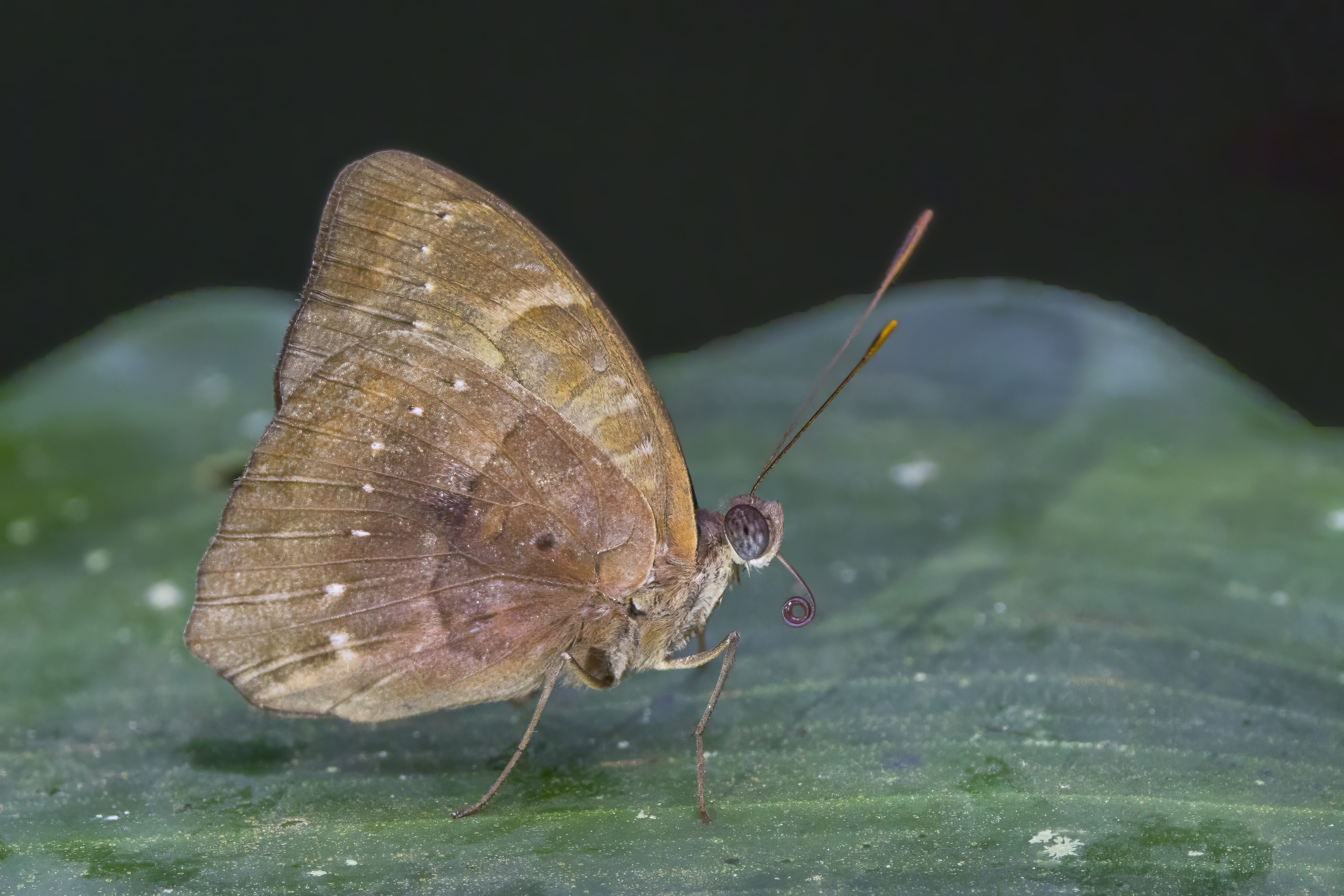
- Both males, in Ghana

Scientific classification
- Kingdom: Animalia
- Phylum: Arthropoda
- Clade: Pancrustacea
- Class: Insecta
- Order: Lepidoptera
- Family: Nymphalidae
- Genus: Euriphene
- Species: E. simplex

Binomial name
- Euriphene simplex (Staudinger, 1891)

Synonyms
- Aterica simplex Staudinger, 1891; Euriphene (Euriphene) simplex

= Euriphene simplex =

Species of butterfly

Euriphene simplex, the simple nymph, is a butterfly in the family Nymphalidae. It is found in Guinea, Sierra Leone, Liberia, Ivory Coast and Ghana. The habitat consists of forests.

Torben Larsen developed a species numbering system for his 2005 publication Butterflies of West Africa. This species is #974. The 'Larsen' numbers have since been used with permission in A Sharp Eye on Butterflies of Ghana.
