= Euriphene rectangula =

Scientific classification
- Domain: Eukaryota
- Kingdom: Animalia
- Phylum: Arthropoda
- Class: Insecta
- Order: Lepidoptera
- Family: Nymphalidae
- Genus: Euriphene
- Species: E. rectangula

Binomial name
- Euriphene rectangula (Schultze, 1920)

Synonyms
- Diestogyna rectangula Schultze, 1920; Euriphene (Euriphene) rectangula

Species of butterfly

Euriphene rectangula is a butterfly in the family Nymphalidae. It is found from Cameroon to the Democratic Republic of the Congo (Moyen-Congo).
