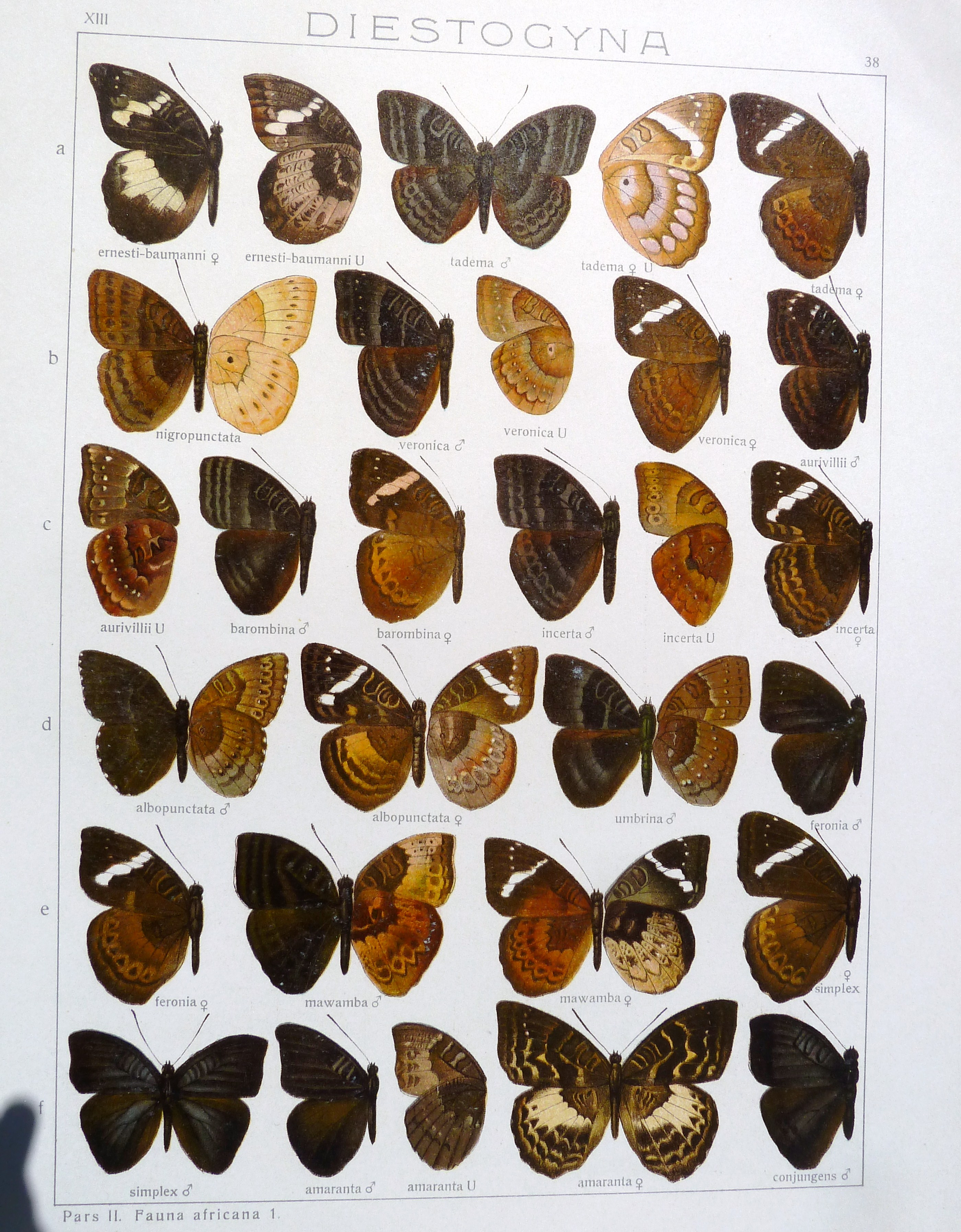
- In Adalbert Seitz's Fauna Africana

Scientific classification
- Domain: Eukaryota
- Kingdom: Animalia
- Phylum: Arthropoda
- Class: Insecta
- Order: Lepidoptera
- Family: Nymphalidae
- Genus: Euriphene
- Species: E. amaranta

Binomial name
- Euriphene amaranta (Karsch, 1894)

Synonyms
- Diestogyna amaranta Karsch, 1894; Euriphene (Euriphene) amaranta

= Euriphene amaranta =

Species of butterfly

Euriphene amaranta is a butterfly in the family Nymphalidae. It is found from Cameroon to the Democratic Republic of the Congo (Uele, Tshopo, Kivu) and in western Uganda.
