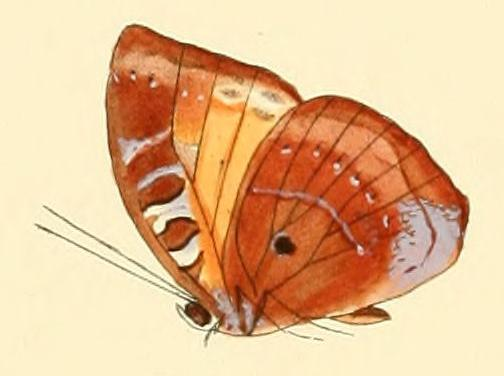

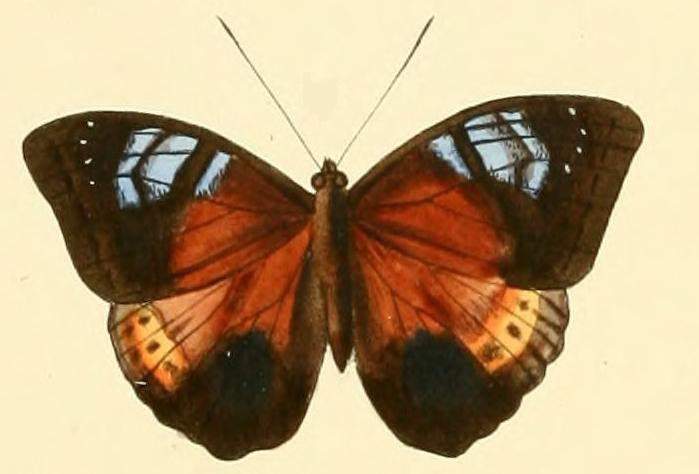

Scientific classification
- Domain: Eukaryota
- Kingdom: Animalia
- Phylum: Arthropoda
- Class: Insecta
- Order: Lepidoptera
- Family: Nymphalidae
- Genus: Euriphene
- Species: E. milnei

Binomial name
- Euriphene milnei (Hewitson, 1865)

Synonyms
- Euryphene milnei Hewitson, 1865; Euriphene (Euriphene) milnei; Diestogyna fuscomarginata Bartel, 1905

= Euriphene milnei =

Species of butterfly

Euriphene milnei, the cinnamon nymph, is a butterfly in the family Nymphalidae. It is found in eastern Nigeria, Cameroon, the Republic of the Congo and the Democratic Republic of the Congo (Equateur). The habitat consists of wetter forests.

The larvae feed on Rhaptopetalum species.
