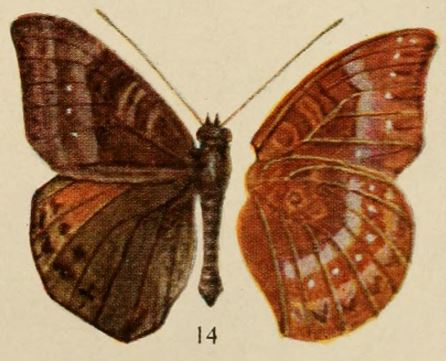

Scientific classification
- Kingdom: Animalia
- Phylum: Arthropoda
- Class: Insecta
- Order: Lepidoptera
- Family: Nymphalidae
- Genus: Euriphene
- Species: E. rotundata

Binomial name
- Euriphene rotundata (Holland, 1920)

Synonyms
- Diestogyna rotundata Holland, 1920; Euriphene (Euriphene) rotundata

= Euriphene rotundata =

Species of butterfly

Euriphene rotundata is a butterfly in the family Nymphalidae. It is found in the Democratic Republic of the Congo (Uele).
