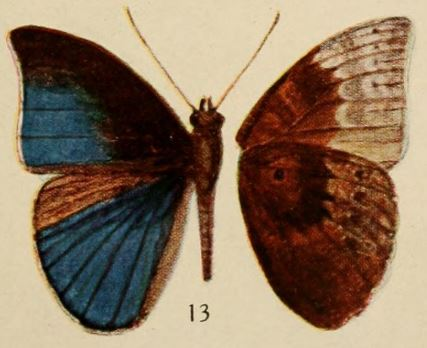

Scientific classification
- Kingdom: Animalia
- Phylum: Arthropoda
- Class: Insecta
- Order: Lepidoptera
- Family: Nymphalidae
- Genus: Euriphene
- Species: E. kahli

Binomial name
- Euriphene kahli (Holland, 1920)

Synonyms
- Diestogyna kahli Holland, 1920; Euriphene (Euriphene) kahli

= Euriphene kahli =

Species of butterfly

Euriphene kahli is a butterfly in the family Nymphalidae. It is found in the Democratic Republic of the Congo (Uele, Kinshasa, Sankuru and Lualaba).
