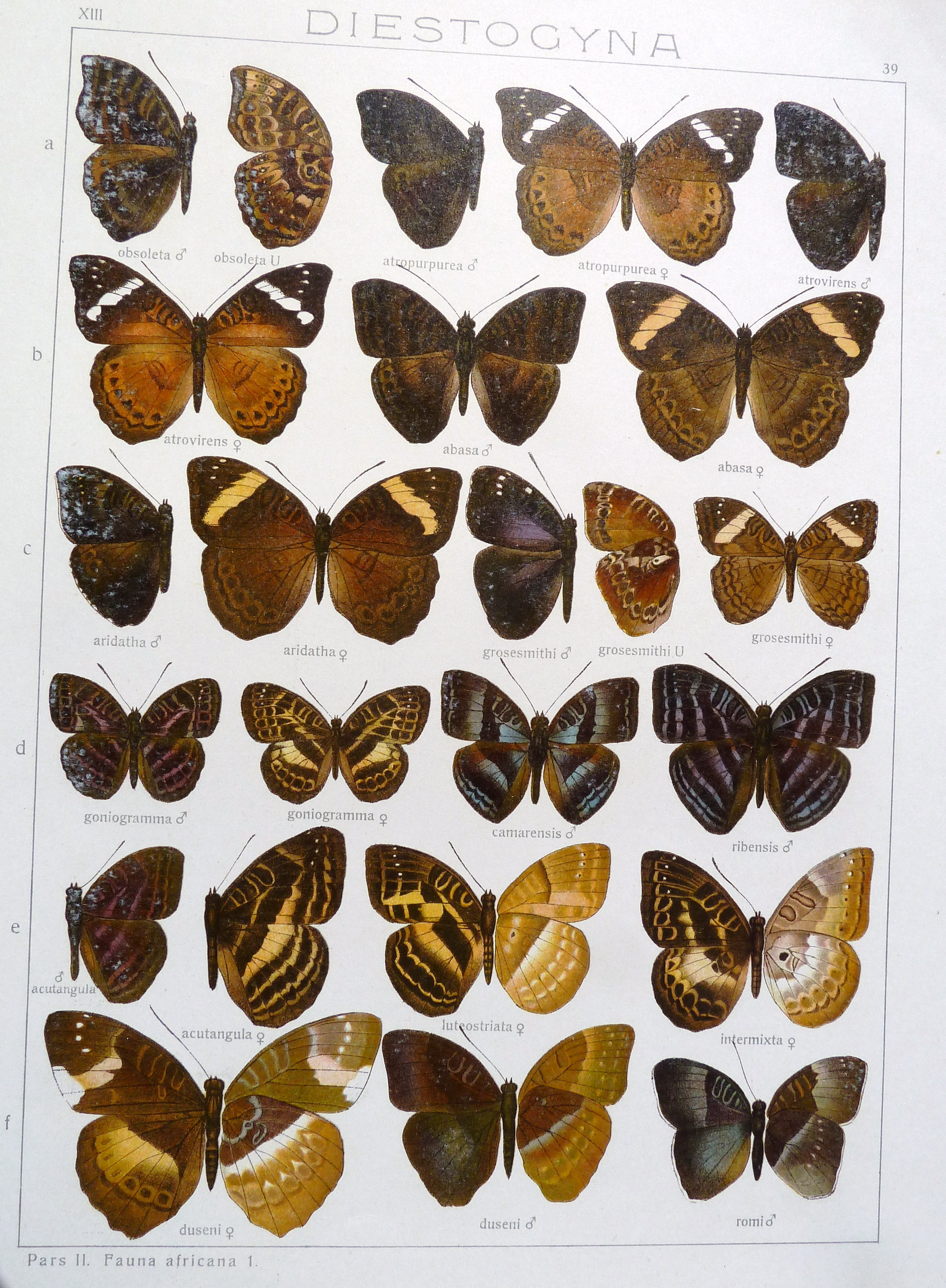
- In Adalbert Seitz's Fauna Africana

Scientific classification
- Domain: Eukaryota
- Kingdom: Animalia
- Phylum: Arthropoda
- Class: Insecta
- Order: Lepidoptera
- Family: Nymphalidae
- Genus: Euriphene
- Species: E. luteostriata

Binomial name
- Euriphene luteostriata (Bethune-Baker, 1908)

Synonyms
- Diestogyna luteostriata Bethune-Baker, 1908; Euriphene (Euriphene) luteostriata

= Euriphene luteostriata =

Species of butterfly

Euriphene luteostriata is a butterfly in the family Nymphalidae. It is found in Cameroon and the Democratic Republic of the Congo (Ituri and northern Kivu).
