= Euriphene jacksoni =

Scientific classification
- Domain: Eukaryota
- Kingdom: Animalia
- Phylum: Arthropoda
- Class: Insecta
- Order: Lepidoptera
- Family: Nymphalidae
- Genus: Euriphene
- Species: E. jacksoni

Binomial name
- Euriphene jacksoni (Talbot, 1937)

Synonyms
- Diestogyna jacksoni Talbot, 1937; Euriphene (Euriphene) jacksoni

Species of butterfly

Euriphene jacksoni is a butterfly in the family Nymphalidae. It is found in the Democratic Republic of the Congo (from the eastern part of the country to northern Kivu and Tshopo) and Uganda, where it is found along the western shore of Lake Victoria.
