= Euriphene moloukou =

Scientific classification
- Domain: Eukaryota
- Kingdom: Animalia
- Phylum: Arthropoda
- Class: Insecta
- Order: Lepidoptera
- Family: Nymphalidae
- Genus: Euriphene
- Species: E. moloukou

Binomial name
- Euriphene moloukou Hecq, 2002

Synonyms
- Euriphene (Euriphene) moloukou

Species of butterfly

Euriphene moloukou is a butterfly in the family Nymphalidae. It is found in the Central African Republic.
