= Euriphene regula =

Scientific classification
- Domain: Eukaryota
- Kingdom: Animalia
- Phylum: Arthropoda
- Class: Insecta
- Order: Lepidoptera
- Family: Nymphalidae
- Genus: Euriphene
- Species: E. regula

Binomial name
- Euriphene regula Hecq, 1994

Synonyms
- Euriphene amicia regula Hecq, 1994; Euriphene (Euriphene) regula; Euriphene panda Hecq, 1997

Species of butterfly

Euriphene regula, the panda nymph, is a butterfly in the family Nymphalidae. It is found in Cameroon and the Democratic Republic of the Congo (Équateur). The habitat consists of forests.
