= Euriphene glaucopis =

Scientific classification
- Kingdom: Animalia
- Phylum: Arthropoda
- Clade: Pancrustacea
- Class: Insecta
- Order: Lepidoptera
- Family: Nymphalidae
- Genus: Euriphene
- Species: E. glaucopis

Binomial name
- Euriphene glaucopis (Gaede, 1916)

Synonyms
- Diestogyna glaucopis Gaede, 1916; Euriphene (Euriphene) glaucopis

Species of butterfly

Euriphene glaucopis, the cobalt nymph, is a butterfly in the family Nymphalidae. It is found in southeastern Nigeria, Cameroon, Gabon, the Republic of the Congo, and the western part of the Democratic Republic of the Congo. Its habitat consists of forests.

This species has a wingspan of 43 mm (1.7 in) and the holotype was collected in Ikelemba at the Sangha River in Neukamerun.
