= Euriphene batesana =

Scientific classification
- Domain: Eukaryota
- Kingdom: Animalia
- Phylum: Arthropoda
- Class: Insecta
- Order: Lepidoptera
- Family: Nymphalidae
- Genus: Euriphene
- Species: E. batesana

Binomial name
- Euriphene batesana Bethune-Baker, 1926

Synonyms
- Diestogyna batesana Bethune-Baker, 1926; Euriphene (Euriphene) batesana

Species of butterfly

Euriphene batesana is a butterfly in the family Nymphalidae. It is found from Ivory Coast to Cameroon.
