= Euriphene hecqui =

Scientific classification
- Kingdom: Animalia
- Phylum: Arthropoda
- Class: Insecta
- Order: Lepidoptera
- Family: Nymphalidae
- Genus: Euriphene
- Species: E. hecqui

Binomial name
- Euriphene hecqui Collins & Larsen, 1997

Synonyms
- Euriphene (Euriphene) hecqui

Species of butterfly

Euriphene hecqui is a butterfly in the family Nymphalidae. It is found in southern Cameroon, the Democratic Republic of the Congo (Équateur) and the Central African Republic.
