= Euriphene adumbrata =

Scientific classification
- Kingdom: Animalia
- Phylum: Arthropoda
- Class: Insecta
- Order: Lepidoptera
- Family: Nymphalidae
- Genus: Euriphene
- Species: E. adumbrata

Binomial name
- Euriphene adumbrata (Joicey & Talbot, 1928)

Synonyms
- Diestogyna adumbrata Joicey and Talbot, 1928; Euriphene (Euriphene) adumbrata

Species of butterfly

Euriphene adumbrata is a butterfly in the family Nymphalidae. It is found in the Democratic Republic of the Congo, from the eastern part of the country to Kivu.
