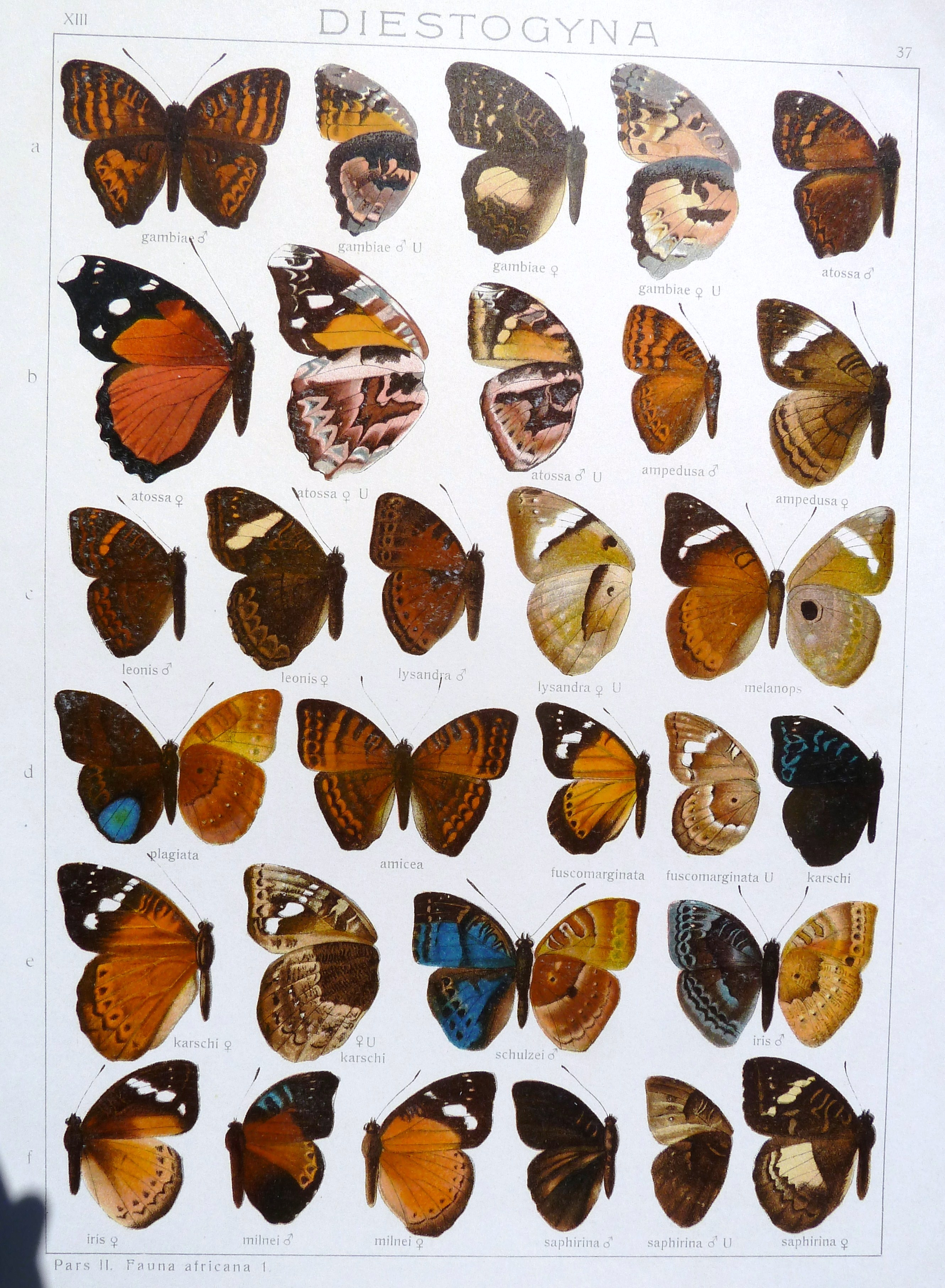
- In Adalbert Seitz's Fauna Africana

Scientific classification
- Domain: Eukaryota
- Kingdom: Animalia
- Phylum: Arthropoda
- Class: Insecta
- Order: Lepidoptera
- Family: Nymphalidae
- Genus: Euriphene
- Species: E. schultzei

Binomial name
- Euriphene schultzei (Aurivillius, 1909)

Synonyms
- Diestogyna schultzei Aurivillius, 1909; Euriphene (Euriphene) schultzei

= Euriphene schultzei =

Species of butterfly

Euriphene schultzei, or Schultze's nymph, is a butterfly in the family Nymphalidae. It is found in Cameroon and the Central African Republic. The habitat consists of forests.
