= Euriphene amieti =

Scientific classification
- Kingdom: Animalia
- Phylum: Arthropoda
- Class: Insecta
- Order: Lepidoptera
- Family: Nymphalidae
- Genus: Euriphene
- Species: E. amieti

Binomial name
- Euriphene amieti Collins & Larsen, 1997

Synonyms
- Euriphene (Euriphene) amieti

Species of butterfly

Euriphene amieti is a butterfly in the family Nymphalidae. It is found in south-eastern Cameroon.
