= Anthodon =

Anthodon may refer to:

- Anthodon (plant), a genus of plants in the Celastraceae
- Anthodon (reptile), a genus of extinct reptiles
