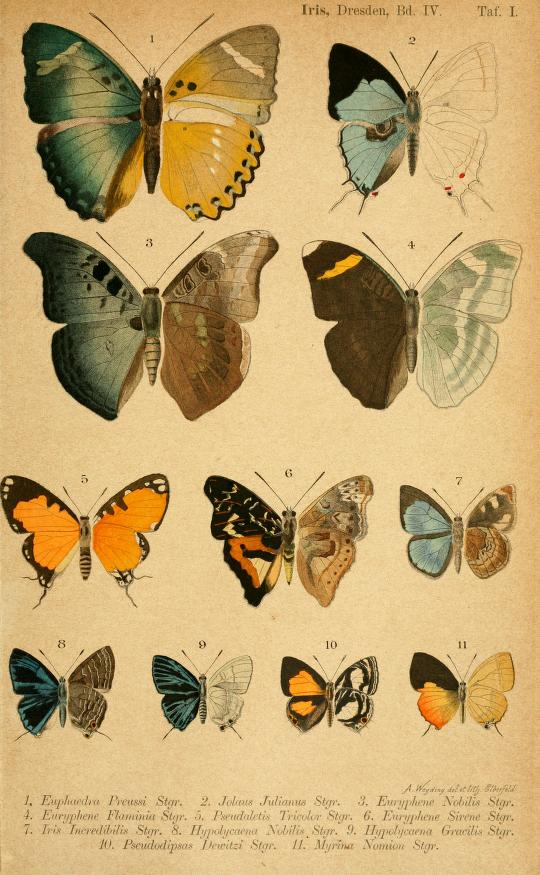
- Plate accompanying Otto Staudinger's original description. Figure 3 is Euryphura nobilis

Scientific classification
- Domain: Eukaryota
- Kingdom: Animalia
- Phylum: Arthropoda
- Class: Insecta
- Order: Lepidoptera
- Family: Nymphalidae
- Tribe: Adoliadini
- Genus: Euryphura; Staudinger, [1891]

Synonyms
- Crenidomimas Karsch, 1894; Metacrenis Butler, 1895; Euryphurana Hecq, 1992 (disputed)

= Euryphura =

Genus of brush-footed butterflies

Euryphura is a butterfly genus in the subfamily Limenitidinae. The species of this genus are found in the Afrotropical realm.

== Species ==
Listed alphabetically within species groups:

- Subgenus Euryphura
  - The porphyrion species group
    - Euryphura porphyrion (Ward, 1871)
    - Euryphura togoensis Suffert, 1904
  - The achlys species group
    - Euryphura achlys (Hopffer, 1855)
    - Euryphura chalcis (C. & R. Felder, 1860)
    - Euryphura isuka Stoneham, 1935
    - Euryphura plautilla (Hewitson, 1865)
  - Unknown species group
    - Euryphura athymoides Berger, 1981
    - Euryphura ducarmei Hecq, 1990
- Subgenus Crenidomimas Karsch, 1894
  - Euryphura concordia (Hopffer, 1855)

== Former species ==
- Euryphura nobilis Staudinger, 1891 is sometimes placed in its own genus, Euryphurana.
