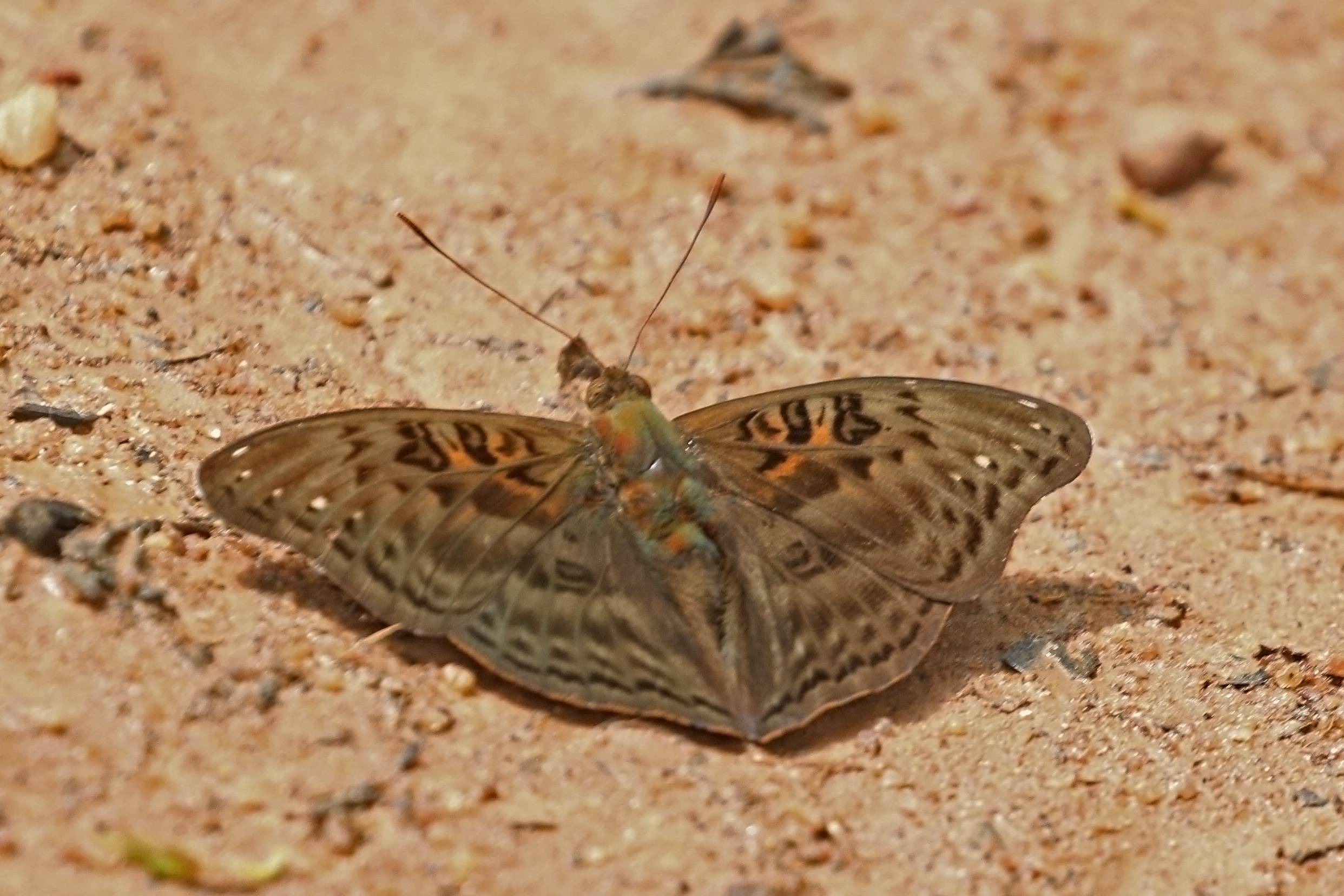

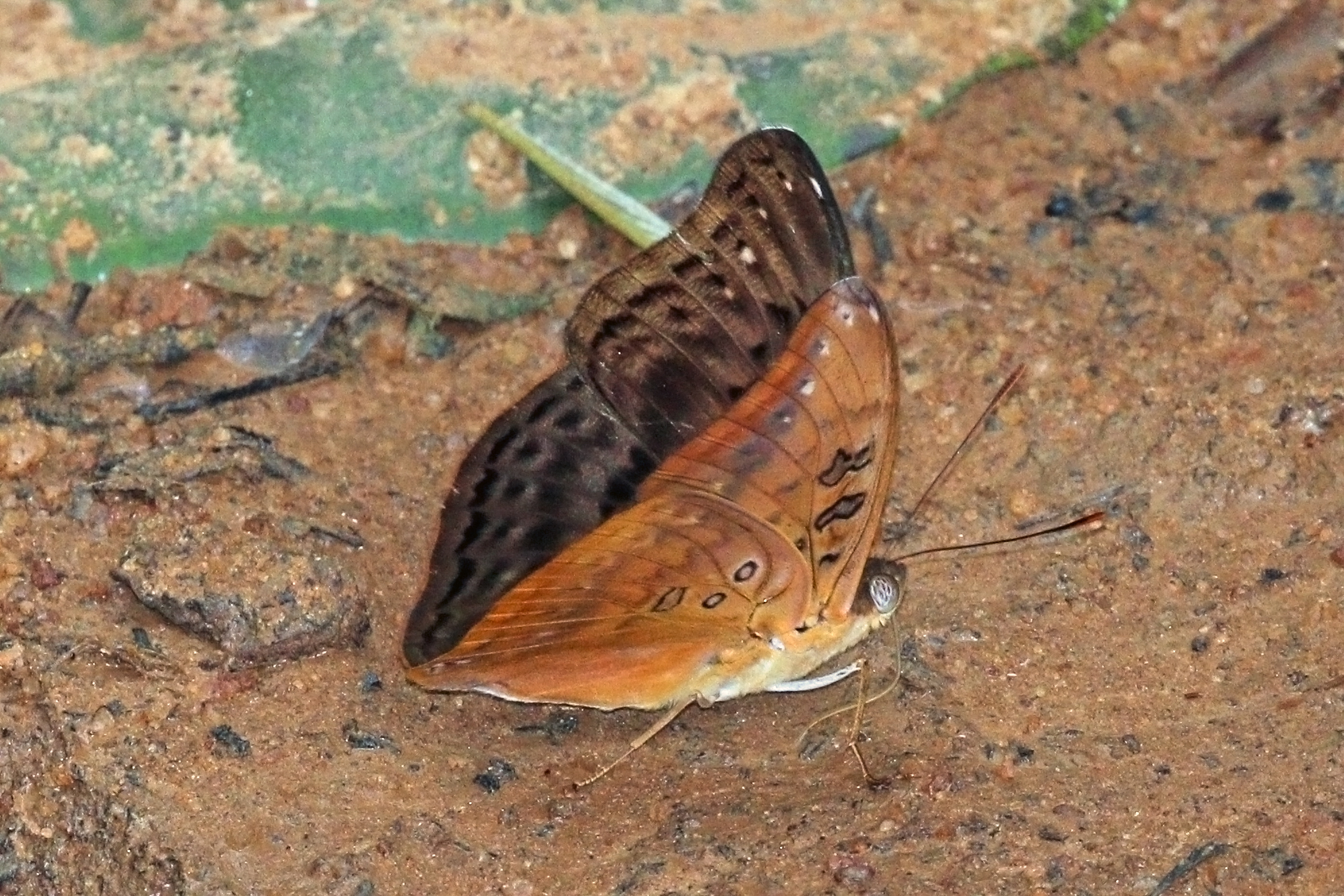
- both male E. c. chalcis Bobiri Forest, Ghana

Scientific classification
- Kingdom: Animalia
- Phylum: Arthropoda
- Clade: Pancrustacea
- Class: Insecta
- Order: Lepidoptera
- Family: Nymphalidae
- Genus: Euryphura
- Species: E. chalcis

Binomial name
- Euryphura chalcis (Felder & Felder, 1860)

Synonyms
- Harma chalcis Felder & Felder, 1860; Euryphura (Euryphura) chalcis; Euryphene doralice Hewitson, 1865; Harma claudianus Druce, 1874; Euriphura plautilla var. albofasciata Staudinger, 1896; Euryphura oliva Suffert, 1904; Euryphura oliva albula Suffert, 1904; Euryphura ochracea Bartel, 1905; Euryphura fulminea Bartel, 1905; Euryphura euthalioides Schultze, 1916; Euryphura plautilla ab. versicolora Schultze, 1920; Euryphura plautilla ab. aereofasciata Schultze, 1920; Euryphura plautilla f. albimargo Joicey and Talbot, 1921; Euryphura plautilla albimargo f. neooliva van Someren, 1939; Euryphura plautilla albimargo f. bicolor van Someren, 1939; Euryphura vansomereni Jackson, 1956; Euryphura jolyana Hecq, 1990; Euryphura chalcis f. acupincta Hecq, 1992; Euryphura chalcis f. grisea Hecq, 1992; Euryphura chalcis f. transversa Hecq, 1992; Euryphura chalcis f. velutina Hecq, 1992; Euryphura chalcis f. xeros Hecq, 1992; Euriphene (Euryphura) hecqui Ackery, 1995; Euryphura kiellandi Hecq, 1990

= Euryphura chalcis =

Species of butterfly

Euryphura chalcis, the common commander, is a butterfly in the family Nymphalidae. It is found in Senegal, Guinea, Sierra Leone, Liberia, Ivory Coast, Ghana, Togo, Benin, Nigeria, Cameroon, Gabon, the Republic of the Congo, the Central African Republic, the Democratic Republic of the Congo, Uganda, Kenya, Tanzania and Zambia. The habitat consists of forests.

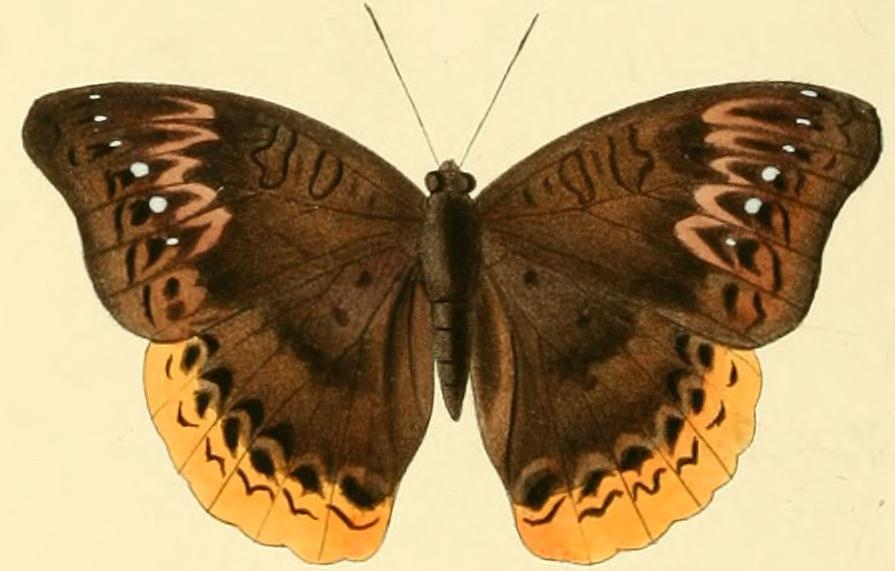

Adults have been recorded feeding on Cleistopholis patens. It is thought the nectar in these flowers had fermented.

The larvae feed on Hugonia platysepala, Ventilago, Pterocarpus, Dalbergia, Cassia, Celtis, Hippocratea and Chrysophyllum species.

== Subspecies ==
- Euryphura chalcis chalcis (Senegal, Guinea, Sierra Leone, Liberia, Ivory Coast, Ghana, Togo, Benin, Nigeria, Cameroon, Gabon, Congo, Central African Republic, Democratic Republic of the Congo, western Uganda, north-western Tanzania, north-western Zambia)
- Euryphura chalcis kiellandi Hecq, 1990 (western Tanzania)

Torben Larsen developed a species numbering system for his 2005 publication Butterflies of West Africa. The nominate subspecies is #948. The 'Larsen' numbers have since been used with permission in A Sharp Eye on Butterflies of Ghana. 20 different forms of both the males and the females of this very variable species are illustrated.
