= Anthodon decussatus =

Conservation status
- Least Concern (IUCN 3.1)

Scientific classification
- Kingdom: Plantae
- Clade: Tracheophytes
- Clade: Angiosperms
- Clade: Eudicots
- Clade: Rosids
- Order: Celastrales
- Family: Celastraceae
- Genus: Anthodon; Ruiz & Pavon
- Species: A. decussatus

Binomial name
- Anthodon decussatus Ruiz & Pav.

Synonyms
- Anthodus Mart.; Anthodon panamensis A.C.Sm.; Anthodon selloanus Schult. & Schult.f.; Anthodon trinervis (Spreng.) Schult. & Schult.f.; Hippocratea anthodon Pers.; Hippocratea decussata (Ruiz & Pav.) Peyr.; Hippocratea decussata var. communis Peyr.; Hippocratea decussata var. lanceolata Peyr.; Hippocratea decussata var. parviflora Loes.; Prionostemma kunthiana Miers; Salacia brevistaminea Pittier; Salacia decussata (Ruiz & Pav.) G.Don; Salacia trinervia (Spreng.) G.Don; Tonsella decussata (Ruiz & Pav.) Vahl; Tonsella trinervia Spreng.; Tontelea decussata (Ruiz & Pav.) Vahl

Species of flowering plant

Anthodon decussatus is a species of flowering plant in the family Celastraceae, and the sole species in genus Anthodon. It is a large woody climbing vine (liana) native to Costa Rica and Panama in Central America and northern and Amazonian South America to Bolivia, Paraguay, and southeastern Brazil. They are scattered throughout most of the Neotropics, but are not common in any part of their range. They grow in wet forests from 100 m to 900 m in elevation. There is no known use of these vines by humans.

== Description ==
Anthodon decussatus is a large liana. Its leaves are opposite or subopposite, simple, and with margins that are crenulate or serrulate. They are elliptic, 6 to 12 cm long, and 2.5 to 5 cm wide.

The inflorescences are borne in the axils of the leaves, on peduncles 5 to 30 mm long. They are roughly flat-topped in shape, dichotomously branched, and bearing numerous flowers.

The flowers are a greenish or pale yellow, fragrant, and 5 to 10 mm in diameter. They are bisexual and pentamerous, with the sepals and petals being completely free. The sepals and petals are serrate; the petals conspicuously so, often with each tooth tapering to a short hair.

The stamens are three in number, equal, and ascending to erect. The filaments are short and broadened toward the base. The anthers are basifixed and broadly reniform, opening by a transverse, apical cleft. A nectary disk encircles the stamens.

The ovary is 3-sided and 3-locular, with 8 to 14 ovules per locule. The placentation is axile. The style is short and stout, surmounted by three small, triangular stigmas, these located opposite the stamens.

The fruit is distinctive, easily attracting attention by its odd appearance. There is usually only one per inflorescence. It has been described as three coherent capsules and as a 3-locular capsule. It is dorso-ventrally flattened into a disk which hangs lantern-like from the peduncle attached at its center. It is green and variable in size, up to 18 cm in diameter.

In most of its close relatives, the three locules of the ovary become three separate fruits, but in Anthodon, they are united for their entire length and over half their width into a trilobed capsule with a notch at the end of each lobe. At maturity, the capsule breaks into three pieces, with each locule splitting down the middle and the adjacent halves of the locules remaining fused, sometimes weakly so.

Unlike many in Celastraceae, the seeds have no aril. Eight to 14 are crowded into each locule. The basal part of the seed is a membranous wing with a single, central vein that forms as a remnant of the funiculus. The embryoniferous part of the seed is near the edge of the capsule.

== Names ==
The name Anthodon was coined by Ruiz and Pavon in 1798 in their masterpiece, Flora Peruviana et Chilensis. It means "flower tooth" or "flower teeth", and refers to the prominent teeth that line the margins of the sepals and petals. At the end of their description, they wrote, "Genus Anthodon à foliolis calycinis et petalis dentato-ciliatis nominavimus". They described one species, Anthodon decussatus, named for the decussate arrangement of the leaves. It is the type species for the genus.

In 1940, Albert C. Smith named the second species, Anthodon panamense. Some doubted that Anthodon contains two species, suggesting it is a single species with a disjunct distribution and a Panamanian variety.

After Ruiz and Pavon established the genus Anthodon, several species were assigned to it by other authors, resulting in a genus that was hard to distinguish from a few others. These species have been reassigned to other genera.

== Relatives ==
In a treatment of the family Celastraceae in 2004, Mark Simmons placed Anthodon in the subfamily Hippocrateoideae, which contains about 100 species. Hippocrateoideae is one of three morphologically distinct and monophyletic subfamilies embedded in the large, paraphyletic subfamily Celastroideae. The classification proposed by Simmons is an artificial construct, meant to be used until a phylogenetic classification of Celastraceae can be found.

The subfamily Hippocrateoideae (sensu Simmons) encompasses about a third of the species of the now defunct family Hippocrateaceae that was erected by Jussieu in 1811. The division of Hippocrateoideae into genera has been a source of considerable disagreement. Simmons recognizes 19 genera in this group. Most authors have recognized fewer genera and some have put all of the 100 or so species into one genus, a very broadly circumscribed Hippocratea.

== Circumscription ==
The genus Anthodon has been variously "sunk" into other genera. In 1872, John Miers placed the only species known at that time into Prionostemma. Theodor Loesener placed it in Hippocratea subgenus Pristimera.

Anthodon has not yet been sampled for DNA, but four of its close relatives, Hippocratea, Pristimera, Plagiopteron, and Loesenerella were sampled for a molecular phylogeny of Celastraceae that was published in 2008. The ultimate botanical fate of Anthodon can not presently be known. It might be subsumed into some other genus or it might be expanded by having additional species transferred to it. Only further studies of Celastraceae will provide an answer.
