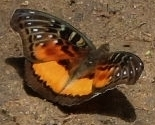

Scientific classification
- Kingdom: Animalia
- Phylum: Arthropoda
- Clade: Pancrustacea
- Class: Insecta
- Order: Lepidoptera
- Family: Nymphalidae
- Genus: Euryphura
- Species: E. togoensis

Binomial name
- Euryphura togoensis Suffert, 1904

Synonyms
- Euryphura porphyrion togoensis Suffert, 1904; Euryphura (Euryphura) togoensis

= Euryphura togoensis =

Species of butterfly

Euryphura togoensis, or Suffert's commander, is a butterfly in the family Nymphalidae. It is found in Sierra Leone, Ivory Coast, Ghana, Nigeria, Cameroon and possibly Togo. The habitat consists of forests.

Adults are attracted to fallen fruit.

Torben Larsen developed a species numbering system for his 2005 publication Butterflies of West Africa. This species is #946. The 'Larsen' numbers have since been used with permission in A Sharp Eye on Butterflies of Ghana.
