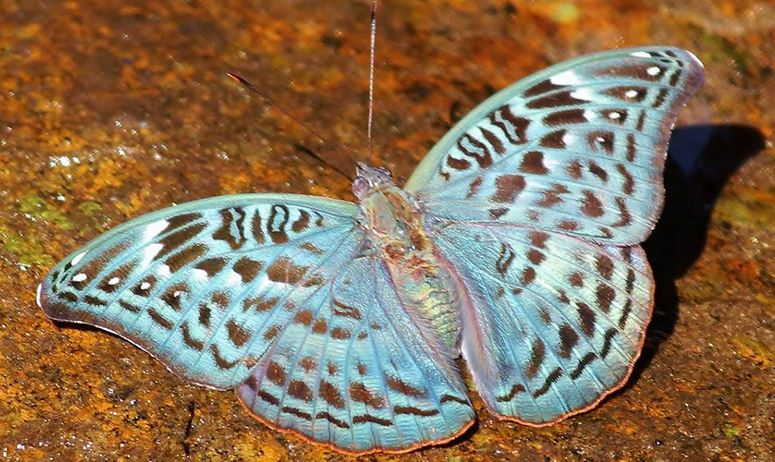

Scientific classification
- Domain: Eukaryota
- Kingdom: Animalia
- Phylum: Arthropoda
- Class: Insecta
- Order: Lepidoptera
- Family: Nymphalidae
- Genus: Euryphura
- Species: E. achlys

Binomial name
- Euryphura achlys (Hopffer, 1855)

Synonyms
- Harma achlys Hopffer, 1855; Euryphura achlus

= Euryphura achlys =

Species of butterfly

Euryphura achlys, the forest green butterfly or mottled-green nymph, is a butterfly of the family Nymphalidae. The southernmost limit is Ongoye Forest, South Africa. It is also found in the forests of eastern Zimbabwe, around Mulanje Massif in south eastern Malawi, Mozambique and Kenya.

The wingspan is 48–55 mm for males and 55–65 mm for females. Adults are on wing year round, but mainly from March to June.

Larval food plants are the common coca tree (Erythroxylum emarginatum) and Craibia brevicaudata.
