= Euryphura athymoides =

Scientific classification
- Domain: Eukaryota
- Kingdom: Animalia
- Phylum: Arthropoda
- Class: Insecta
- Order: Lepidoptera
- Family: Nymphalidae
- Genus: Euryphura
- Species: E. athymoides

Binomial name
- Euryphura athymoides Berger, 1981

Synonyms
- Euryphura plautilla ab. athymoides Schultze, 1920; Euryphura isuka athymoides; Euryphura (Euryphura) athymoides

Species of butterfly

Euryphura athymoides is a butterfly in the family Nymphalidae. It is found in southern Cameroon, the Central African Republic, the Republic of the Congo and the Democratic Republic of the Congo.
