= Euryphura ducarmei =

Scientific classification
- Domain: Eukaryota
- Kingdom: Animalia
- Phylum: Arthropoda
- Class: Insecta
- Order: Lepidoptera
- Family: Nymphalidae
- Genus: Euryphura
- Species: E. ducarmei

Binomial name
- Euryphura ducarmei Hecq, 1990

Synonyms
- Euryphura (Euryphura) ducarmei

Species of butterfly

Euryphura ducarmei is a butterfly in the family Nymphalidae. It is found in the Democratic Republic of the Congo. The habitat consists of forests.
