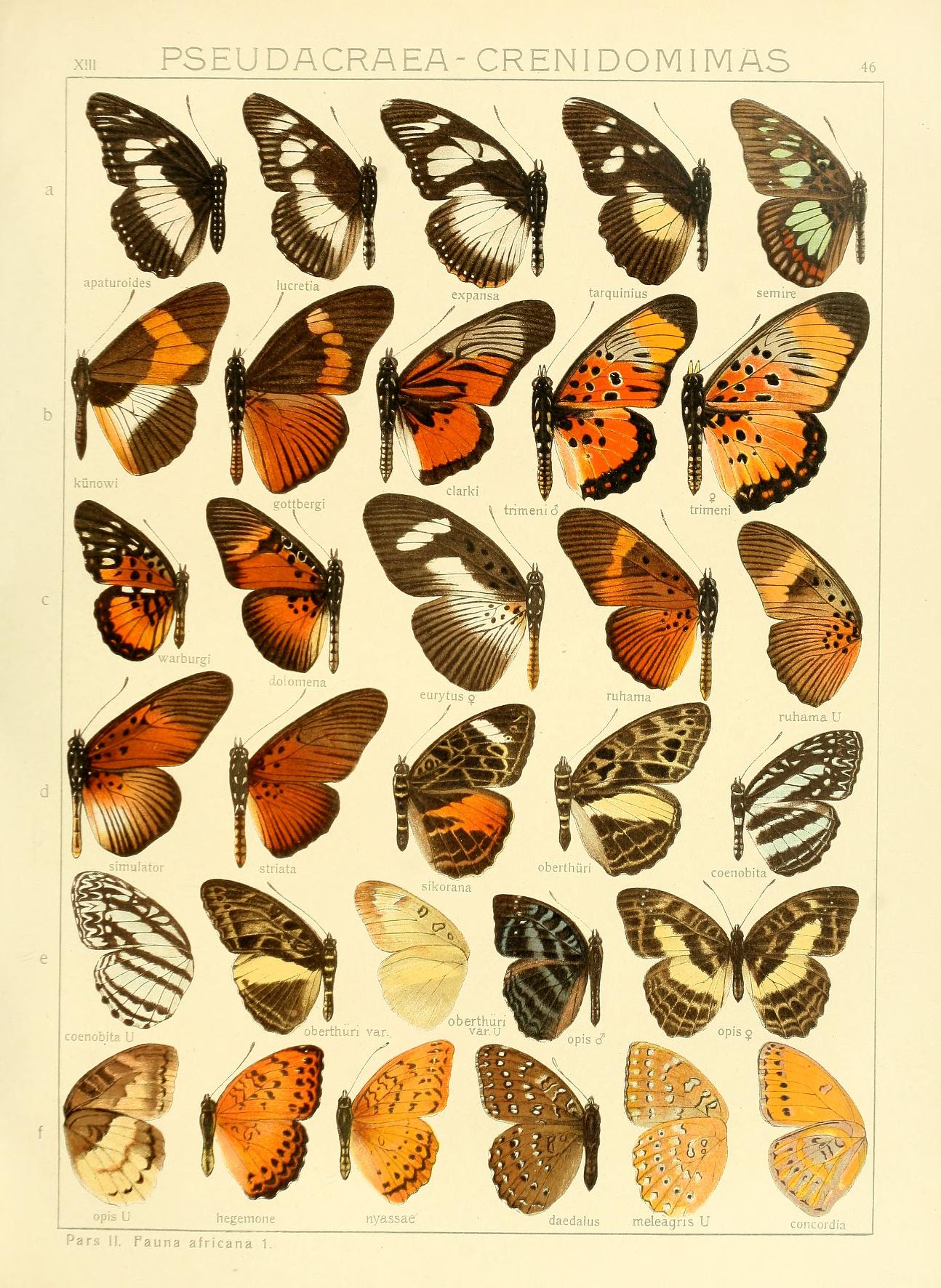
- In Adalbert Seitz's Fauna Africana

Scientific classification
- Domain: Eukaryota
- Kingdom: Animalia
- Phylum: Arthropoda
- Class: Insecta
- Order: Lepidoptera
- Family: Nymphalidae
- Genus: Euryphura
- Species: E. concordia

Binomial name
- Euryphura concordia (Hopffer, 1855)

Synonyms
- Harma concordia Hopffer, 1855; Euryphura (Crenidomimas) concordia; Crenis crawshayi Butler, 1894

= Euryphura concordia =

Species of butterfly

Euryphura concordia, the speckled lilac nymph, is a butterfly in the family Nymphalidae. It is found in Democratic Republic of the Congo (Ituri, Kinshasa, Kasai, Sankuru, Shaba, Lomami, Lualaba), eastern Angola, northern Zambia, Tanzania, Malawi, Mozambique and Zimbabwe. The habitat consists of Brachystegia woodland.

Adults are attracted to fermenting fruit. They are on wing from August to October and in February, April and May.

The larvae feed on Brachystegia spiciformis.
