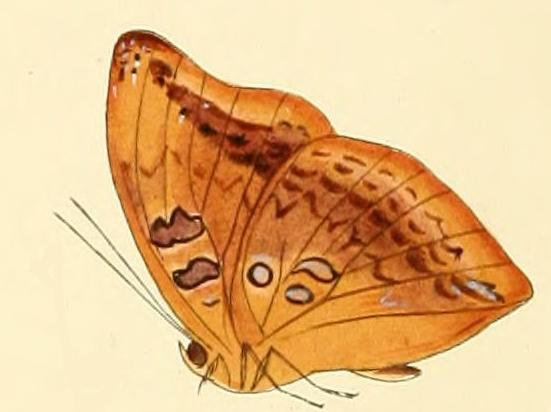

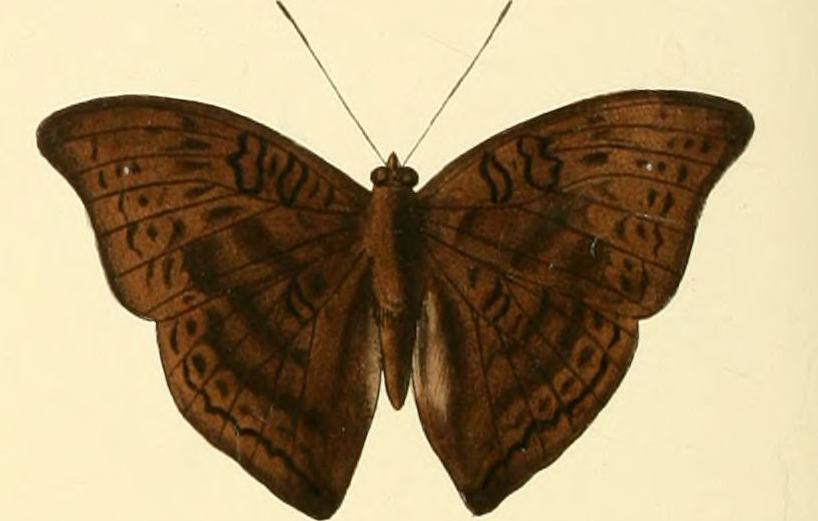

Scientific classification
- Domain: Eukaryota
- Kingdom: Animalia
- Phylum: Arthropoda
- Class: Insecta
- Order: Lepidoptera
- Family: Nymphalidae
- Genus: Euryphura
- Species: E. plautilla

Binomial name
- Euryphura plautilla (Hewitson, 1865)

Synonyms
- Euryphene plautilla Hewitson, 1865; Euryphura (Euryphura) plautilla; Euryphene doralice Hewitson, 1865; Cymothoe lisidora Aurivillius, 1891; Euryphura aurantiaca Aurivillius, 1898; Euryphura plautilla aurimarginata Suffert, 1904; Euryphura plautilla albimargo van Someren, 1939; Euryphura plautilla albimargo f. neoalbofasciata van Someren, 1939

= Euryphura plautilla =

Species of butterfly

Euryphura plautilla, or Hewitson's commander, is a butterfly in the family Nymphalidae. It is found in Nigeria, Cameroon, Gabon, the Republic of the Congo, the Central African Republic, the Democratic Republic of the Congo and western Uganda. The habitat consists of forests.
