= Euryphura isuka =

Scientific classification
- Domain: Eukaryota
- Kingdom: Animalia
- Phylum: Arthropoda
- Class: Insecta
- Order: Lepidoptera
- Family: Nymphalidae
- Genus: Euryphura
- Species: E. isuka

Binomial name
- Euryphura isuka Stoneham, 1935

Synonyms
- Euryphura (Euryphura) isuka; Euryphura chalcis isuka; Euryphura isuka ithako Stoneham, 1935; Euryphura plautilla albimargo van Someren, 1939; Euryphura plautilla albimargo f. conformis van Someren, 1939; Euryphura plautilla albimargo f. ithako van Someren, 1939; Euryphura plautilla albimargo f. neoathymoides van Someren, 1939; Euryphura albimargo Larsen, 1991; Euryphura isuka f. occidentalis Hecq, 1992

Species of butterfly

Euryphura isuka, the scarce commander, is a butterfly in the family Nymphalidae. It is found in eastern Nigeria, Cameroon, the Democratic Republic of the Congo, Uganda and western Kenya. The habitat consists of forests.
