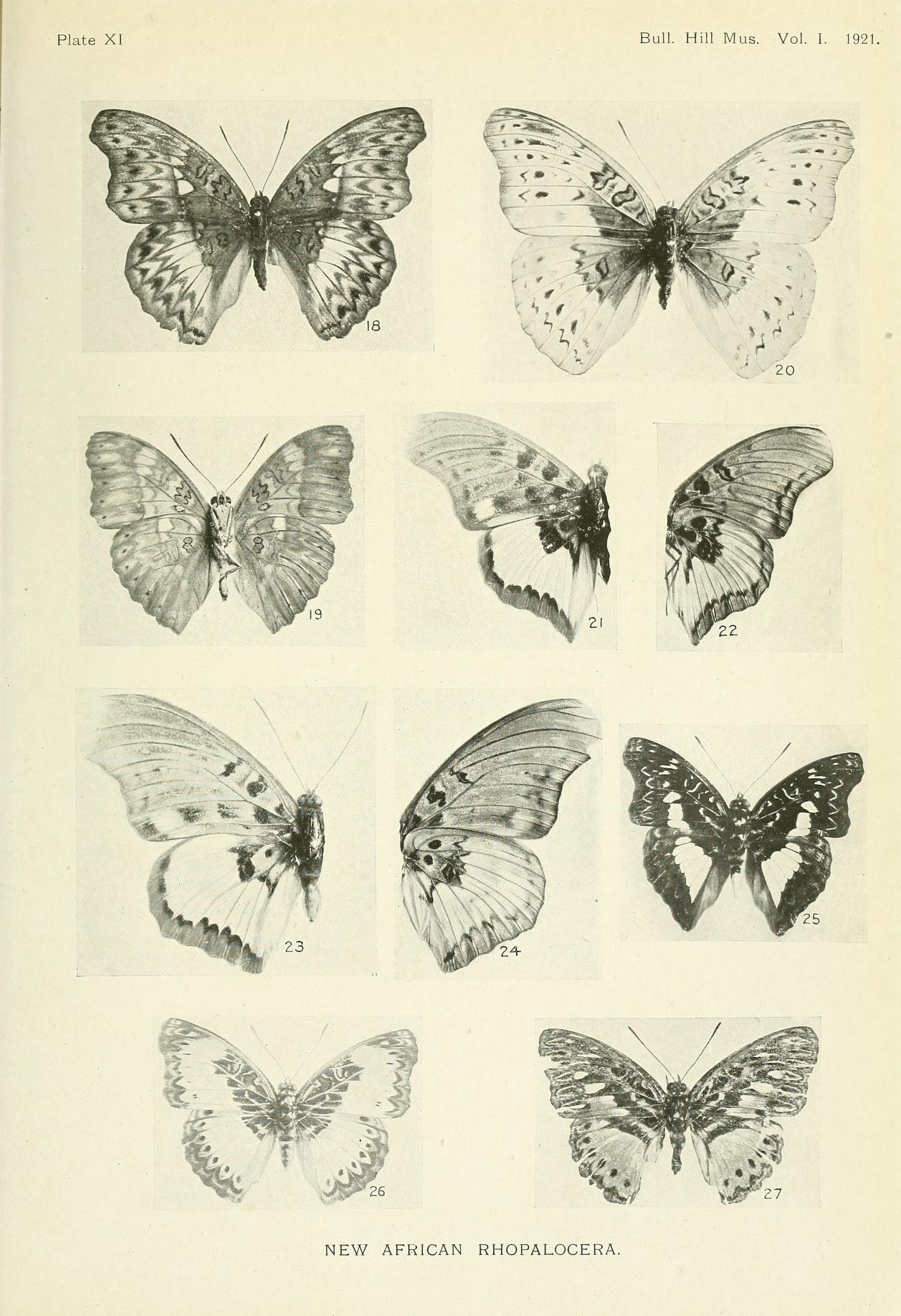
- E. p. congoensis figures 21-24

Scientific classification
- Domain: Eukaryota
- Kingdom: Animalia
- Phylum: Arthropoda
- Class: Insecta
- Order: Lepidoptera
- Family: Nymphalidae
- Genus: Euryphura
- Species: E. porphyrion

Binomial name
- Euryphura porphyrion (Ward, 1871)

Synonyms
- Euryphene porphyrion Ward, 1871; Euryphura (Euryphura) porphyrion; Euryphura fontainei Hecq, 1990

= Euryphura porphyrion =

Species of butterfly

Euryphura porphyrion, the Porphyry commander, is a butterfly in the family Nymphalidae. It is found in Nigeria, Cameroon, Gabon, the Republic of the Congo and the Democratic Republic of the Congo. The habitat consists of forests.

== Subspecies ==
- E. p. porphyrion (Nigeria: Cross River loop, Cameroon)
- E. p. congoensis Joicey & Talbot, 1921 (Democratic Republic of the Congo: Uele, Tshopo, Equateur, Sankuru)
- E. p. fontainei Hecq, 1990 (Democratic Republic of the Congo: central basin)
- E. p. grassei Bernardi, 1965 (Gabon, Congo)
