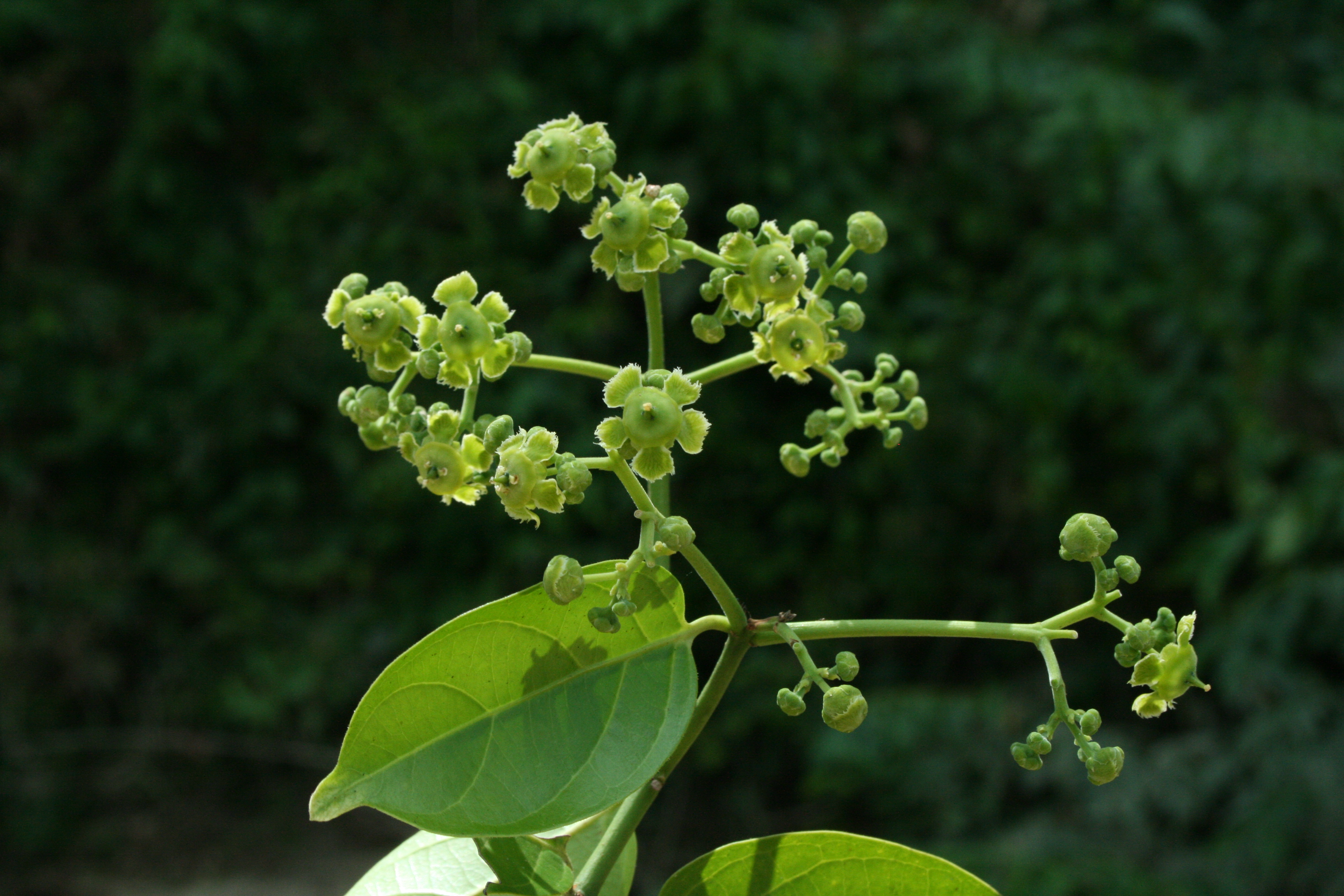

Conservation status
- Least Concern (IUCN 3.1)

Scientific classification
- Kingdom: Plantae
- Clade: Tracheophytes
- Clade: Angiosperms
- Clade: Eudicots
- Clade: Rosids
- Order: Celastrales
- Family: Celastraceae
- Genus: Prionostemma; Miers
- Species: P. aspera

Binomial name
- Prionostemma aspera (Lam.) Miers

Synonyms
- Synonymy: Hippocratea acuminata Hoffmanns. ex Link; Hippocratea aspera Lam. (1791) (basionym); Hippocratea foliosa Rusby; Hippocratea grandiflora Payer; Hippocratea malpighiifolia Rudge; Hippocratea scandens Griseb.; Hippocratea schomburgkii Klotzsch ex Peyr.; Hippocratea scutellata Griseb.; Hippocratea vahliana Peyr.; Prionostemma malpighiifolia (Rudge) Miers; Prionostemma scabridula Miers; Romualdea malpighifolia Triana & Planch.; Romualdea wrightiana Triana & Planch.; Salacia catalinensis Rusby; Salacia radula (Spreng.) G.Don; Salacia vahliana Cambess.; Tonsella malpighifolia (Rudge) G.Mey.; Tonsella radula Spreng.; Tontelea malpighiifolia (Rudge) G.Mey.

= Prionostemma aspera =

Species of flowering plant

Prionostemma aspera is species of flowering plant in the family Celastraceae, and the sole species in genus Prionstemma. It is a scrambling shrub or tree native to the tropical Americas, native from Nayarit in western Mexico to Honduras, and from Costa Rica through northern South America to Bolivia and Northeastern Brazil. It grows in lowland tropical moist forests.
