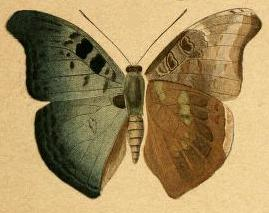

Scientific classification
- Domain: Eukaryota
- Kingdom: Animalia
- Phylum: Arthropoda
- Class: Insecta
- Order: Lepidoptera
- Family: Nymphalidae
- Subfamily: Limenitidinae
- Genus: Euryphurana; Hecq, 1992
- Species: E. nobilis

Binomial name
- Euryphurana nobilis (Staudinger, 1891)

Synonyms
- Euryphura nobilis Staudinger, 1891; Euryphura (Euryphene) nobilis; Euryphura nobilis viridis Hancock, 1990

= Euryphurana =

Monotypic brush-footed butterfly genus

Euryphurana nobilis, the noble commander, is a butterfly in the family Nymphalidae. It is found in Sierra Leone, Liberia, Ivory Coast, Nigeria, Cameroon, the Republic of the Congo, the Central African Republic, the Democratic Republic of the Congo and Zambia. The habitat consists of wetter forests.

Adults have been recorded attending arboreal nests of Crematogaster ants.

== Subspecies ==
- Euryphurana nobilis nobilis (Sierra Leone, Liberia, eastern Ivory Coast, Nigeria, Congo, Central African Republic)
- Euryphurana nobilis viridis (Hancock, 1990) (Zambia, Democratic Republic of the Congo: Shaba)
