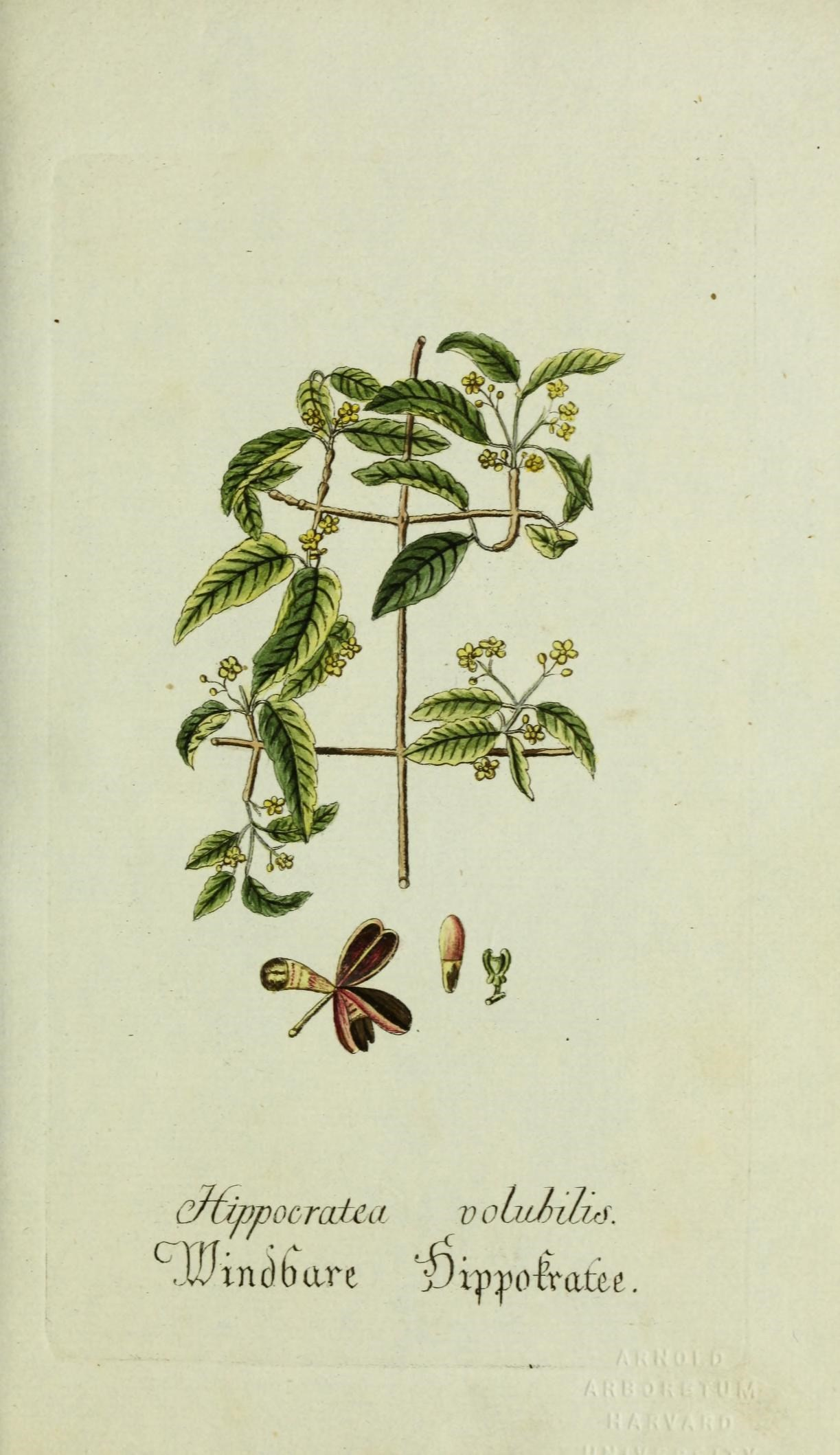
- Hippocratea volubilis botanical illustration

Scientific classification
- Kingdom: Plantae
- Clade: Tracheophytes
- Clade: Angiosperms
- Clade: Eudicots
- Clade: Rosids
- Order: Celastrales
- Family: Celastraceae
- Subfamily: Hippocrateoideae
- Genus: Hippocratea; L.

Species
- See text

Synonyms
- Bejuco Loefl.; Coa Mill.; Pereskia Vell.

= Hippocratea =

Genus of Celastraceae plants

Hippocratea is a genus of flowering plants in the family Celastraceae, usually lianas, native to tropical and subtropical North America, South America and Africa.

== Species ==
Currently accepted species include:

- Hippocratea myriantha Oliv.
- Hippocratea stuhlmanniana Loes.
- Hippocratea vignei Hoyle
- Hippocratea volubilis L.

A large number of species names have been previously associated with Hippocratea.

- Hippocratea acapulcensis Kunth
- Hippocratea acuminata Hoffmanns. ex Link
- Hippocratea acutiflora DC.
- Hippocratea adolphi-friderici Harms
- Hippocratea affinis De Wild. [Illegitimate]
- Hippocratea affinis Cambess.
- Hippocratea africana (Willd.) Loes. ex Engl.
- Hippocratea africana var. richardiana (Cambess.) N.Robson
- Hippocratea aggregata Peyr.
- Hippocratea ambigua Peyr.
- Hippocratea anafensis Urb.
- Hippocratea andamanica King
- Hippocratea andina (Miers) J.F.Macbr.
- Hippocratea andongensis Welw. ex Oliv.
- Hippocratea angulata Griff.
- Hippocratea angustipetala H. Perrier
- Hippocratea anthodon Pers.
- Hippocratea antunesii Loes. ex Harms
- Hippocratea apiculata Welw. ex Oliv.
- Hippocratea apocynoides Welw. ex Oliv.
- Hippocratea apocynoides subsp. guineensis (Hutch. & M.B.Moss) N.Robson
- Hippocratea aptera Loes. ex Harms
- Hippocratea arborea Roxb.
- Hippocratea arnottiana Wight
- Hippocratea aspera Lam.
- Hippocratea aubletiana Miers
- Hippocratea austin-smithii Lundell
- Hippocratea bakeri H. Perrier
- Hippocratea barbata F.Muell.
- Hippocratea beccarii Tuyn
- Hippocratea bequaertii De Wild.
- Hippocratea bilobicarpa Miers
- Hippocratea bipindensis Loes. ex Fritsch
- Hippocratea boinensis H. Perrier
- Hippocratea bojeri Tul.
- Hippocratea bojeri var. hildebrandtii Loes.
- Hippocratea bojeri var. malifolia (Baker) H. Perrier
- Hippocratea bonplandiana Peyr.
- Hippocratea bourdillenii Gamble
- Hippocratea brachystachys Ridl.
- Hippocratea bruneelii De Wild.
- Hippocratea buchananii Loes.
- Hippocratea buchholzii Loes.
- Hippocratea busseana Loes.
- Hippocratea cambodiana Pierre
- Hippocratea camerunica Loes.
- Hippocratea campestris Peyr.
- Hippocratea caribaea Urb.
- Hippocratea cassinoides DC.
- Hippocratea cearensis Miers
- Hippocratea celastroides Kunth
- Hippocratea chariensis A. Chev.
- Hippocratea chesseana Pierre
- Hippocratea chevalieri Hutch. & M.B.Moss
- Hippocratea chiapensis Standl.
- Hippocratea clematoidea Loes. ex De Wild.
- Hippocratea clematoides Loes.
- Hippocratea comosa Sw.
- Hippocratea copiosiflora Miers
- Hippocratea coriacea Wright ex Griseb.
- Hippocratea crenata K. Schum. & Loes.
- Hippocratea crinita Pittier
- Hippocratea cubana Urb.
- Hippocratea cumingii M.A.Lawson
- Hippocratea cymosa De Wild. & T.Durand
- Hippocratea cymosa var. togoensis Loes.
- Hippocratea decussata (Ruiz & Pav.) Peyr.
- Hippocratea decussata var. communis Peyr.
- Hippocratea decussata var. lanceolata Peyr.
- Hippocratea decussata var. parviflora Loes.
- Hippocratea delagoensis Loes.
- Hippocratea dewildemaniana (N.Hallé) J.B.Hall
- Hippocratea diffusa Miers
- Hippocratea diffusiflora (Miers) Loes.
- Hippocratea ding-houi Chakrab. & M.Gangop.
- Hippocratea dinhensis Pierre
- Hippocratea discolor G. Mey.
- Hippocratea disperma Vahl
- Hippocratea disperma Wall.
- Hippocratea divaricata Miers
- Hippocratea domingensis Urb. & Ekman
- Hippocratea elliptica Kunth
- Hippocratea ellipticarpa Merr.
- Hippocratea emarginata Rudge
- Hippocratea euonymoides Vahl
- Hippocratea evonymoides Tul.
- Hippocratea excelsa Kunth
- Hippocratea ferruginea King
- Hippocratea festiva Miers
- Hippocratea fimbriata Exell
- Hippocratea flaccida Peyr.
- Hippocratea flava Gleason
- Hippocratea floribunda Benth.
- Hippocratea foliosa Rusby
- Hippocratea fuscescens Kurz
- Hippocratea glaga Korth.
- Hippocratea goetzei Loes.
- Hippocratea gossweileri Exell
- Hippocratea graciliflora Welw. ex Oliv.
- Hippocratea graciliflora subsp. newalensis Blakelock
- Hippocratea grahamii Wight
- Hippocratea granadensis (Miers) Peyr.
- Hippocratea grandiflora Wall.
- Hippocratea grandiflora Payer
- Hippocratea grisebachii Loes.
- Hippocratea grisebachii var. parvifolia Chodat & Hassl.
- Hippocratea guineensis Hutch. & M.B.Moss
- Hippocratea hasseltiana Miq.
- Hippocratea hideabraandtii Loesner
- Hippocratea hierniana Exell & Mendonça
- Hippocratea hilariana Miers
- Hippocratea hirtiuscula Dunkley
- Hippocratea holdeniana A.C. Sm.
- Hippocratea holtzii Loes. ex Harms
- Hippocratea huanucana Loes.
- Hippocratea indica Willd.
- Hippocratea indica var. parviflora (N.E. Br.) N.E. Br.
- Hippocratea infuscata Miers
- Hippocratea integrifolia A. Rich.
- Hippocratea inundata Mart. ex Peyr.
- Hippocratea iotricha Loes. ex Fritsch
- Hippocratea isangiensis De Wild.
- Hippocratea kageraensis Loes. in Mildbr.
- Hippocratea kaimlecta Loes. ex Harms
- Hippocratea kappleriana Miq.
- Hippocratea kennedyi Hoyle
- Hippocratea kirkii Oliv.
- Hippocratea laevigata Vahl
- Hippocratea lanceolata Buch.-Ham. ex Wall.
- Hippocratea lancifolia Lundell
- Hippocratea lasiandra Loes. ex Harms
- Hippocratea lawsonii Elmer
- Hippocratea lepida (Miers) Miers ex Peyr.
- Hippocratea lindenii Urb.
- Hippocratea loandensis Exell
- Hippocratea lobbii M.A.Lawson
- Hippocratea loesneriana Hutch. & M.B.Moss
- Hippocratea lonchophylla Miers
- Hippocratea longipes Oliv.
- Hippocratea longipetiolata Oliv.
- Hippocratea lutea Gleason
- Hippocratea luteoviridis Exell
- Hippocratea macrantha Korth.
- Hippocratea macrophylla Vahl
- Hippocratea madagascariensis Lam.
- Hippocratea maingayi M.A.Lawson
- Hippocratea majumdarii Chakrab. & M.Gangop.
- Hippocratea malifolia Baker
- Hippocratea malpighiifolia Rudge
- Hippocratea martii Hassl.
- Hippocratea megacarpa Peyr.
- Hippocratea megalocarpa Merr.
- Hippocratea meizantha S.F. Blake
- Hippocratea menyharthii Schinz
- Hippocratea mexicana Miers
- Hippocratea micrantha Cambess.
- Hippocratea miersii Loes.
- Hippocratea minimiflora H. Perrier
- Hippocratea mitchellae I.M.Johnst.
- Hippocratea molunduina Loes. ex Harms
- Hippocratea mucronata Exell
- Hippocratea multiflora Lam.
- Hippocratea nervosa (Miers) J.F.Macbr.
- Hippocratea nicobarica Kurz
- Hippocratea nigricaulis Ridl.
- Hippocratea nitida Oberm.
- Hippocratea obcordata Lam.
- Hippocratea oblongata Sol. ex Miers
- Hippocratea obovata Rich.
- Hippocratea obtusa Ridl.
- Hippocratea obtusifolia sensu Oliv.
- Hippocratea obtusifolia var. barbata (F.Muell.) Benth.
- Hippocratea obtusifolia var. fischerana Loes.
- Hippocratea obtusifolia var. richardiana (Cambess.) Loes.
- Hippocratea odorata De Wild.
- Hippocratea oliveriana Hutch. & M.B.Moss
- Hippocratea opacifolia J.F.Macbr.
- Hippocratea ovalifolia Miers
- Hippocratea ovata Lam.
- Hippocratea ovata var. crassifolia Peyr.
- Hippocratea ovata var. grandiflora Peyr.
- Hippocratea ovata var. latibarbis Peyr.
- Hippocratea ovata f. multiflora Peyr.
- Hippocratea ovata var. oblongifolia DC.
- Hippocratea ovata var. serrulata Peyr.
- Hippocratea pachnocarpa Loes. ex Fritsch
- Hippocratea pachyphylla Urb.
- Hippocratea pallens Planch. ex Oliv.
- Hippocratea pallida Craib
- Hippocratea pallidula Miers
- Hippocratea paniculata Vahl
- Hippocratea paniculata (Mart.) Hassl. [Illegitimate]
- Hippocratea parkinsonii Chakrab. & M.Gangop.
- Hippocratea parviflora N.E.Br.
- Hippocratea parvifolia Oliv.
- Hippocratea pauciflora Rose
- Hippocratea pentandra Griff.
- Hippocratea pereskia Steud.
- Hippocratea perspicua Miers
- Hippocratea plumbea Blakelock & R.Wilczek
- Hippocratea plumieri Miers
- Hippocratea poggei Loes.
- Hippocratea polyantha Loes.
- Hippocratea preussii Loes.
- Hippocratea puberula Craib
- Hippocratea pygmaeantha Loes. ex Harms
- Hippocratea pynaerti De Wild.
- Hippocratea richardiana Cambess.
- Hippocratea riedeliana Peyr.
- Hippocratea rigida Span.
- Hippocratea rigida Hampe ex M.A.Lawson
- Hippocratea ritschardii (R.Wilczek) N.Robson
- Hippocratea rotundifolia Hook.f.
- Hippocratea rovirosae Standl.
- Hippocratea rowlandii Loes.
- Hippocratea rubiginosa H. Perrier
- Hippocratea salacioides Korth.
- Hippocratea scandens Jacq.
- Hippocratea scheffleri Loes.
- Hippocratea schimperiana Hochst. & Steud.
- Hippocratea schlechteri Loes.
- Hippocratea schomburgkii Klotzsch ex Peyr.
- Hippocratea scutellata Griseb.
- Hippocratea seleriana Loes.
- Hippocratea semlikiensis Robyns & Tournay
- Hippocratea senegalensis Lam.
- Hippocratea senegalensis var. madagascariensis (Lam.) Poir.
- Hippocratea serrata Griff.
- Hippocratea serrulata Ettingsh.
- Hippocratea setulifera Hemsl. ex Pittier
- Hippocratea sogerensis Baker f.
- Hippocratea staudtii Loes.
- Hippocratea subintegra S.F.Blake
- Hippocratea sulcata Craib
- Hippocratea swartziana Miers
- Hippocratea tabascensis Lundell
- Hippocratea tenuiflora Mart. ex Peyr.
- Hippocratea tenuiflora f. angustifolia Hassl.
- Hippocratea tenuiflora var. grisebachii (Loes.) Hassl.
- Hippocratea tetramera H. Perrier
- Hippocratea thomasii Hutch. & M.B.Moss
- Hippocratea timorensis Span.
- Hippocratea tortuosa Wall.
- Hippocratea trichopetala Merr.
- Hippocratea trilobulata Ridl.
- Hippocratea tulasnei Drake
- Hippocratea ulei Loes.
- Hippocratea unguiculata Loes.
- Hippocratea uniflora Moc. & Sessé ex DC.
- Hippocratea urceolus Tul.
- Hippocratea utilis Rose
- Hippocratea vahliana Miers
- Hippocratea velutina Afzel.
- Hippocratea venulosa Hutch. & M.B.Moss
- Hippocratea verdickii De Wild.
- Hippocratea verrucosa Kunth
- Hippocratea verrucosa Griseb. [Illegitimate]
- Hippocratea versicolor Miers
- Hippocratea verticillata Steud.
- Hippocratea verticillata var. madagascariensis (Lam.) Pers.
- Hippocratea viridis Ruiz & Pav.
- Hippocratea volkensii Loes.
- Hippocratea volkii Suess.
- Hippocratea warmingii Peyr. ex Fritsch [Invalid]
- Hippocratea welwitschii Oliv.
- Hippocratea wrightiana (Miers) Urb.
- Hippocratea yaundina Loes.
- Hippocratea yucatanensis Standl.
- Hippocratea yunnanensis Hu
- Hippocratea zenkeri Loes.
- Hippocratea zippeliana Miq.
