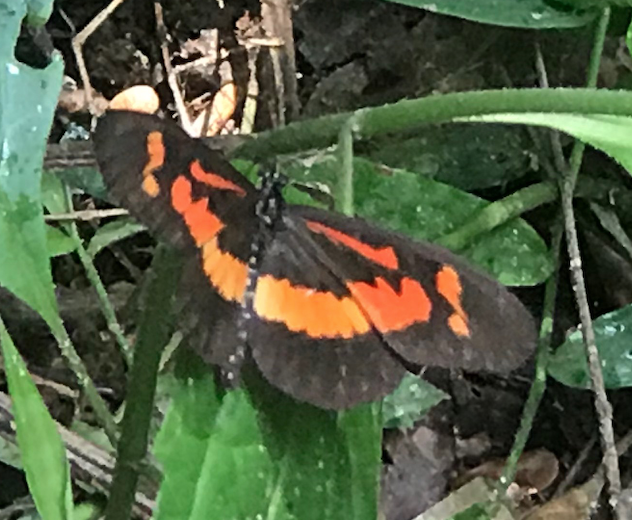
- Acraea althoffi bitjana

Scientific classification
- Kingdom: Animalia
- Phylum: Arthropoda
- Class: Insecta
- Order: Lepidoptera
- Family: Nymphalidae
- Genus: Acraea
- Species: A. althoffi

Binomial name
- Acraea althoffi Dewitz, 1889

Synonyms
- rubrofasciata Aurivillius, 1895 (ssp.); neavei Poulton, 1924 (ssp.); bitjana Carcasson, 1981 (ssp.); f. ♀ ochreata Eltringham, 1912; f. ♀ telloides Eltringham, 1912; f. ♀ drucei Eltringham, 1912; f. bitjana Bethune-Baker, 1926; f. ♀ lycioides Carpenter, 1931; f. ♀ budongoensis Carpenter, 1935; f. ♀ ochrareducta Stoneham, 1936; f. ♀ ochramaculata Stoneham, 1936; f. ♀ ochrafasciata Stoneham, 1936; f. ♀ albicans Stoneham, 1936; f. ♀ albireducta Stoneham, 1936

= Acraea althoffi =

Althoff's acraea

Species of butterfly

Acraea althoffi, the Althoff's acraea, is a butterfly in the family Nymphalidae. It is found in Cameroon, Gabon, the Democratic Republic of the Congo, the Central African Republic, Uganda, Kenya and Tanzania.

== Description ==
A. althoffi Dew. (56 d) is much larger than the other species of the subgroup [Second group First subgroup of Aurivillius], and differs from them all in the shape of the light marginal spots on the underside of the hind wing (cf. the synopsis). Fore wing black above with a distally widened longitudinal stripe in the cell, a subapical band and a narrow hind- marginal spot in cellules 1 a to 2 red in the male, white in the female; the subapical band consists of 4 spots in cellules 3 to 6; the hindmarginal spot is about 6 mm. in breadth. The upperside of the hind wing black (male) or black-grey with a narrow median band, which in the male is only 3 to 4 mm. in breadth and sulphur-yellow to whitish yellow, but in the female 9 to 10 mm. in breadth and white. The under surface with almost the same markings as above but with distinct basal and discal dots on the hindwing and long black streaks in the distal part. Congo to Uganda. - f. rubrofasciata Auriv. differs in the red median band of the hindwing. Cameroons and Congo. - female f. telloides Eltr. is quite unlike the typical female, but bears a strong resemblance to Planema tellus (58 a). The basal half of the wings is dull orange-yellow nearly to the apex of the cell, the orange- yellow colour covering not only the greater part of cellules 1 a and 1 b and the base of cellule 2 as in Pl. tellus, but also almost the whole of the cell; the subapical band is light ochre-yellow and consists of 4 spots, the one in 3, as in Pl. tellus, placed nearer to the distal margin. Hindwing above dull orange-yellow to the base, at the distal margin with black marginal band 3 mm. in breadth, from which fine black streaks run out proximally on the interneural folds. Uganda. - female ab. drucei Eltr. is similar to the typical male only differing in having the longitudinal streak and the hindmarginal spot of the forewing orange-red (instead of blood-red) and the subapical band light yellow; the median band of the hindwing is somewhat broader than in the male and white; the ground-colour of the upper surface much lighter than in the A. Uganda. - female ab. ochreata Eltr. has the light markings of the upper surface light dull ochre-yellow as in the male of jodutta (57 e). Uganda. - pseudepaea Dudg.[ now species Acraea pseudepaea ] is the north-western race and is distinguished from the typical male by the absence of the stripe in the cell of the forewing and by having the hindmarginal spot and the subapical band of the forewing brown-yellow and the hindwing also brown-yellow with triangular black basal area and a marginal band 2 mm. in breadth formed by the union of the black rays. The female is similar to the male but with lighter brown-yellow colour and almost without marginal band on the upperside of the hindwing. Ashanti and Nigeria.

== Subspecies ==
- Acraea althoffi althoffi (Democratic Republic of the Congo: south and central to Sankuru and Lualaba)
- Acraea althoffi bitjana Bethune-Baker, 1926 (Cameroon, Gabon)
- Acraea althoffi neavei Poulton, 1924 (Uganda, western Kenya, north-western Tanzania)
- Acraea althoffi rubrofasciata Aurivillius, 1895 (Central African Republic, northern and eastern Democratic Republic of the Congo, Uganda: west to the Bwamba Valley)

== Biology ==
The habitat consists of forests.

== Taxonomy ==
It is a member of the Acraea oberthueri species group.- but see also Pierre & Bernaud, 2014
