= Acraea pseudepaea =

Scientific classification
- Kingdom: Animalia
- Phylum: Arthropoda
- Class: Insecta
- Order: Lepidoptera
- Family: Nymphalidae
- Genus: Acraea
- Species: A. pseudepaea

Binomial name
- Acraea pseudepaea Dudgeon, 1909

Synonyms
- Acraea (Actinote) pseudepaea; Acraea althoffi pseudepaea

Species of butterfly

Acraea pseudepaea, Dudgeon's acraea, is a butterfly in the family Nymphalidae. It is found in Guinea, eastern Liberia, Ivory Coast, Ghana and western Nigeria.

== Description ==
Very close to Acraea althoffi q.v for differences.

== Biology ==
The habitat consists of forests.

Adult males mud-puddle.

== Taxonomy ==
It is a member of the Acraea oberthueri species group.- but see also Pierre & Bernaud, 2014
