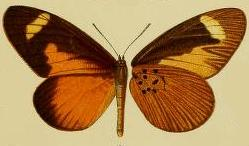

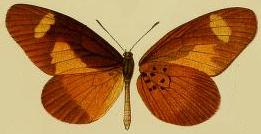

Scientific classification
- Domain: Eukaryota
- Kingdom: Animalia
- Phylum: Arthropoda
- Class: Insecta
- Order: Lepidoptera
- Family: Lycaenidae
- Genus: Mimacraea
- Species: M. landbecki

Binomial name
- Mimacraea landbecki H. H. Druce, 1910

Synonyms
- Mimacraea graeseri Schultze, 1912; Mimacraea pulverulenta Schultze, 1912; Mimacraea schubotzi Schultze, 1912; Mimacraea pseudepaea Schultze, 1923

= Mimacraea landbecki =

Species of butterfly

Mimacraea landbecki is a butterfly in the family Lycaenidae first described by Hamilton Herbert Druce in 1910. It is found in Cameroon, the Republic of the Congo, the Democratic Republic of the Congo (Uele, Tshuapa, Equateur, Kinshasa, Sankuru and Lualaba), Uganda and Tanzania (from the western part of the country to the Bukoba region). The habitat consists of forests.
