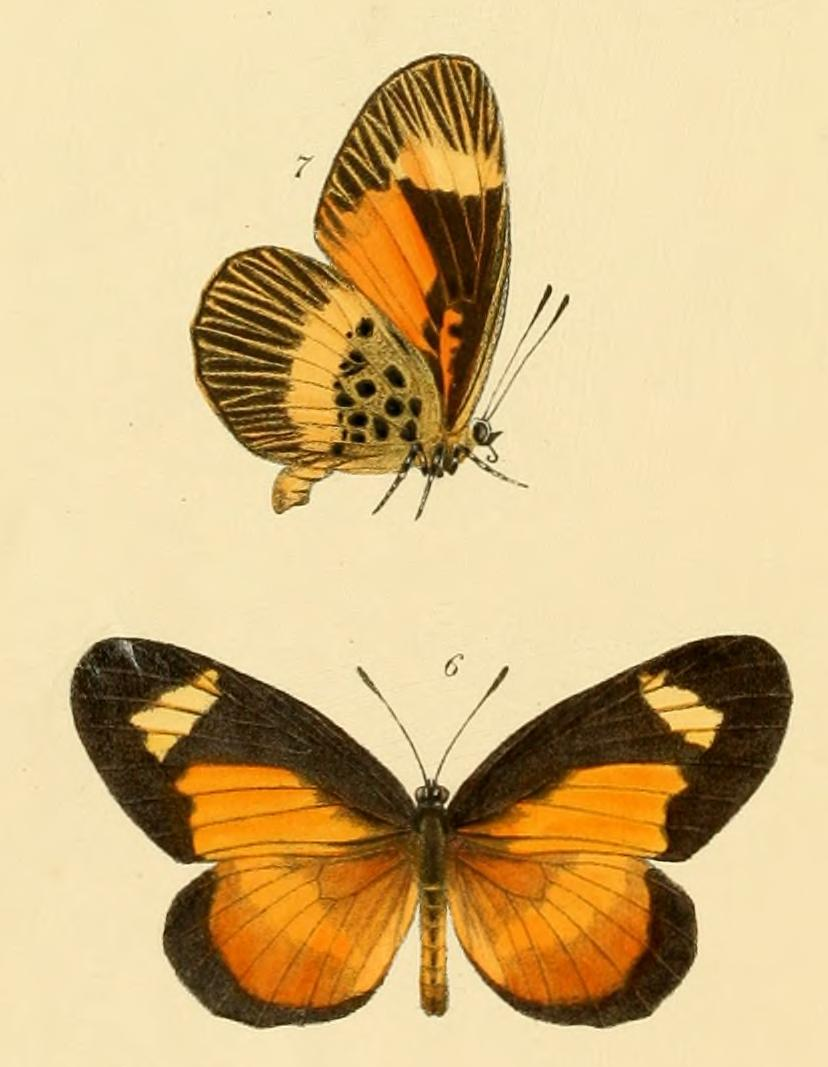

Scientific classification
- Domain: Eukaryota
- Kingdom: Animalia
- Phylum: Arthropoda
- Class: Insecta
- Order: Lepidoptera
- Family: Lycaenidae
- Genus: Mimacraea
- Species: M. apicalis

Binomial name
- Mimacraea apicalis Grose-Smith & Kirby, 1889

= Mimacraea apicalis =

Species of butterfly

Mimacraea apicalis, the central acraea mimic, is a butterfly in the family Lycaenidae. It is found in Nigeria, Cameroon, Gabon and the Republic of the Congo.

Adult males mimic Bematistes tellus, while females appear to mimic Acraea oberthueri.

== Subspecies ==
- Mimacraea apicalis apicalis (Nigeria, Cameroon)
- Mimacraea apicalis gabonica Libert, 2000 (Gabon, Congo)
