= Mimacraea neurata =

Scientific classification
- Kingdom: Animalia
- Phylum: Arthropoda
- Clade: Pancrustacea
- Class: Insecta
- Order: Lepidoptera
- Family: Lycaenidae
- Genus: Mimacraea
- Species: M. neurata

Binomial name
- Mimacraea neurata Holland, 1895

Synonyms
- Mimacraea fulvaria alciopina Joicey and Talbot, 1924

Species of butterfly

Mimacraea neurata, the alciope acraea mimic, is a butterfly in the family Lycaenidae. It is found in Guinea, Sierra Leone, Liberia, Ivory Coast, Ghana, Togo, Nigeria, the Republic of the Congo and the Democratic Republic of the Congo. The habitat consists of forests.

Torben Larsen developed a species numbering system for his 2005 publication Butterflies of West Africa. This species is #179. The 'Larsen' numbers have since been used with permission in A Sharp Eye on Butterflies of Ghana.
