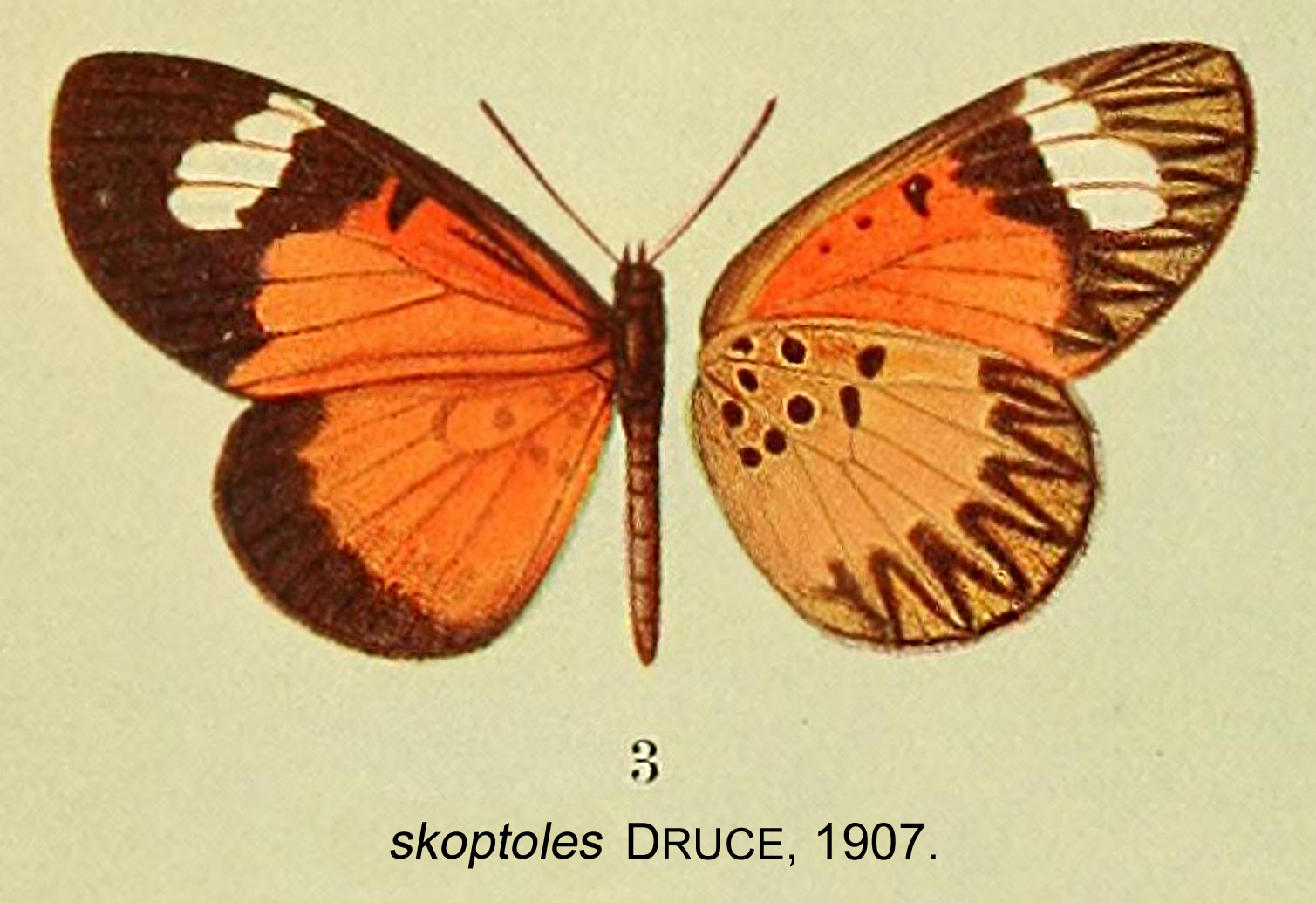

Scientific classification
- Domain: Eukaryota
- Kingdom: Animalia
- Phylum: Arthropoda
- Class: Insecta
- Order: Lepidoptera
- Family: Lycaenidae
- Genus: Mimacraea
- Species: M. skoptoles

Binomial name
- Mimacraea skoptoles H. H. Druce, 1907

Synonyms
- Mimacraea krausei ab. obsolescens Hawker-Smith, 1926

= Mimacraea skoptoles =

Species of butterfly

Mimacraea skoptoles is a butterfly in the family Lycaenidae first described by Hamilton Herbert Druce in 1907. It is found in Tanzania (Kigoma and Mpanda), the Democratic Republic of the Congo (Katanga) and Zambia. The habitat consists of riverine forests.

Females have been observed laying eggs among lichens on the bark of trees, which are presumably the larval host.
