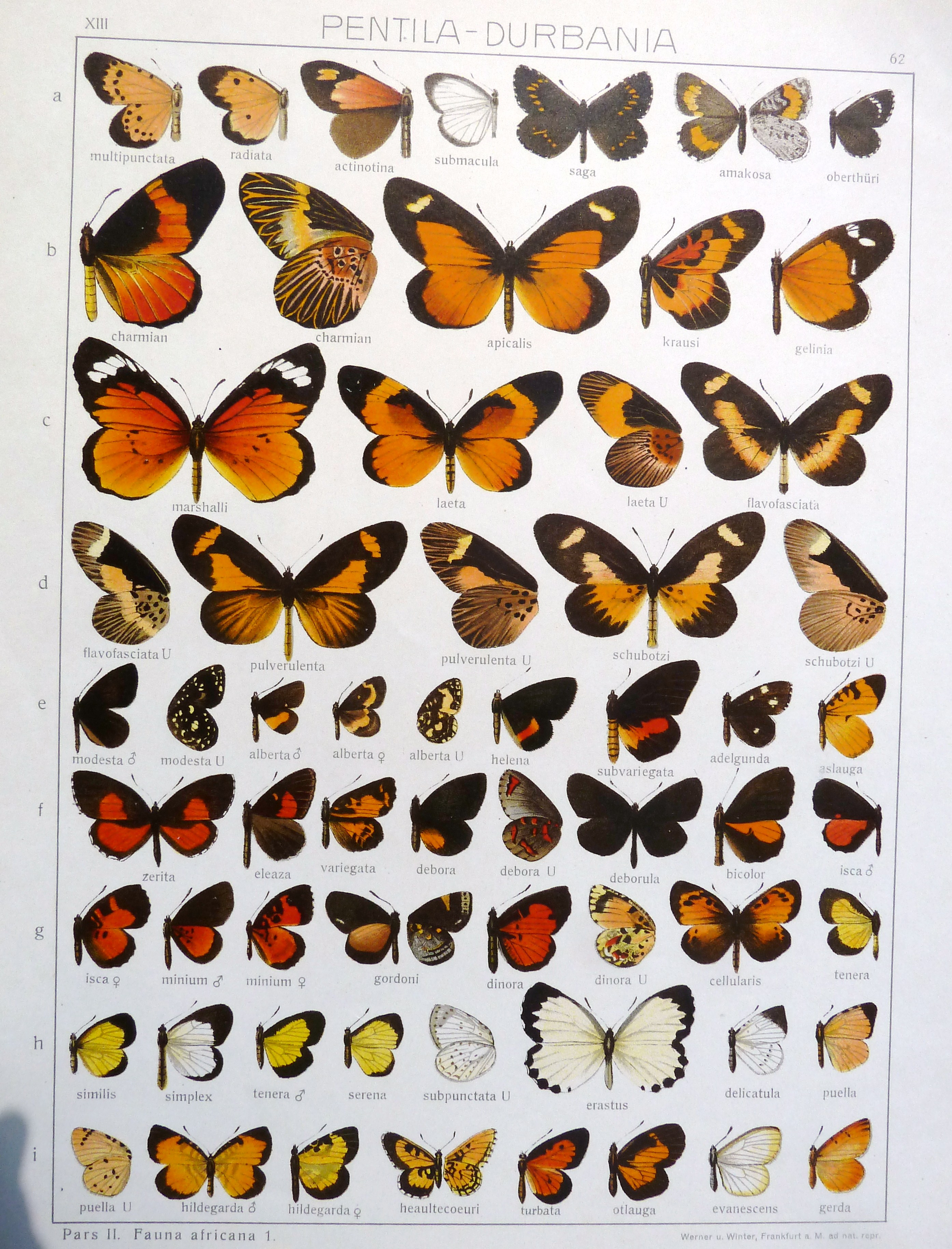
- In Adalbert Seitz Fauna Africana as M. flavofasciata

Scientific classification
- Kingdom: Animalia
- Phylum: Arthropoda
- Class: Insecta
- Order: Lepidoptera
- Family: Lycaenidae
- Genus: Mimacraea
- Species: M. neavei

Binomial name
- Mimacraea neavei Eltringham, 1909

Synonyms
- Mimacraea flavofasciata Schultze, 1912

= Mimacraea neavei =

Species of butterfly

Mimacraea neavei is a butterfly in the family Lycaenidae. It is found in Cameroon.
