= Mimacraea febe =

Scientific classification
- Kingdom: Animalia
- Phylum: Arthropoda
- Class: Insecta
- Order: Lepidoptera
- Family: Lycaenidae
- Genus: Mimacraea
- Species: M. febe

Binomial name
- Mimacraea febe Libert, 2000

Species of butterfly

Mimacraea febe is a butterfly in the family Lycaenidae. It is found in Cameroon.
