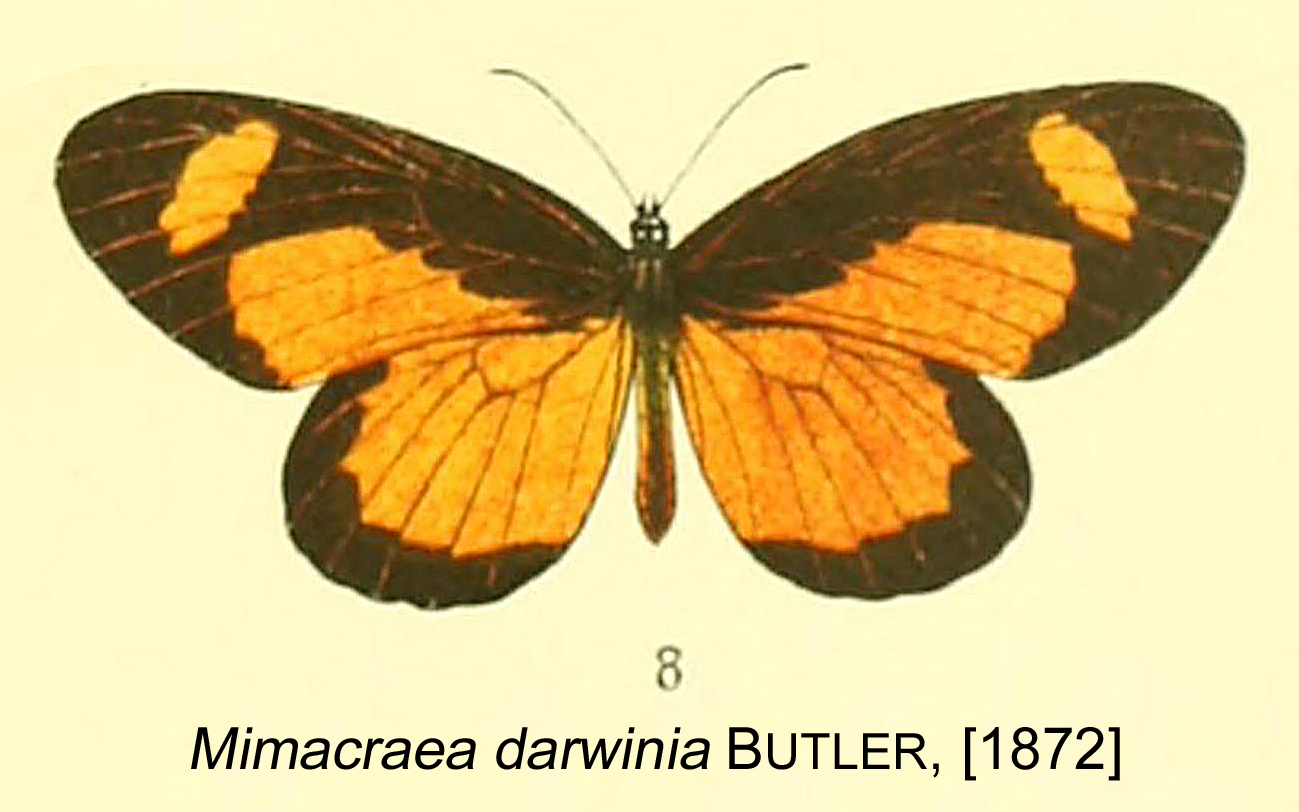

Scientific classification
- Kingdom: Animalia
- Phylum: Arthropoda
- Clade: Pancrustacea
- Class: Insecta
- Order: Lepidoptera
- Family: Lycaenidae
- Genus: Mimacraea
- Species: M. darwinia

Binomial name
- Mimacraea darwinia Butler, 1872

= Mimacraea darwinia =

Species of butterfly

Mimacraea darwinia, the common acraea mimic, is a butterfly in the family Lycaenidae. It is found in Sierra Leone, Liberia, Ivory Coast, Ghana, Nigeria, Cameroon, Gabon and possibly the western part of the Democratic Republic of the Congo. The habitat consists of forests.

Adult males mimic Bematistes epaea.

Torben Larsen developed a species numbering system for his 2005 publication Butterflies of West Africa. This species is #181. The 'Larsen' numbers have since been used with permission in A Sharp Eye on Butterflies of Ghana.
