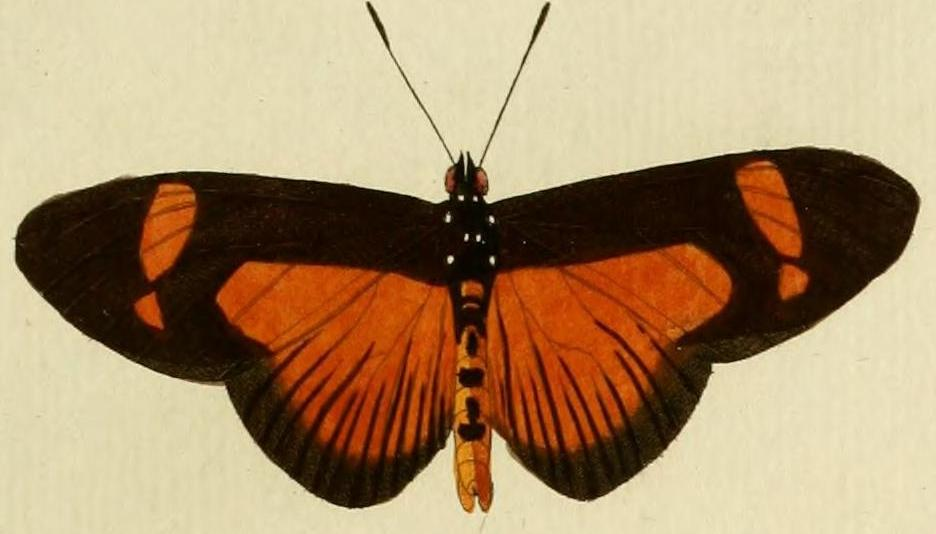

- Mating (female on left)

Scientific classification
- Kingdom: Animalia
- Phylum: Arthropoda
- Clade: Pancrustacea
- Class: Insecta
- Order: Lepidoptera
- Family: Nymphalidae
- Genus: Acraea
- Species: A. epaea

Binomial name
- Acraea epaea (Cramer, 1779)

Synonyms
- Papilio epaea Cramer, 1779; Bematistes epaea; Acraea (Acraea) epaea; Papilio gea Fabricius, 1781; Planema epaea ab. sublutosa Strand, 1914; Planema epaea ab. angustifasciata Grünberg, 1910; Planema epaea bicolorata Le Doux, 1937; Planema epaea f. insolita Le Doux, 1937; Planema epaea f. aurata Le Doux, 1937; Planema epaea nigrita Le Doux, 1937; Acraea epitellus Staudinger, 1896; Planema epaea homochroa Rothschild & Jordan, 1905; Acraea epaea insulana Ackery, 1995; Planema epaea var. insularis Aurivillius, 1910; Planema epaea kivuana Jordan, 1910; Planema epaea lutosa Suffert, 1904; Planema epaea f. cremea Le Doux, 1937; Planema epaea var. melina Thurau, 1903; Planema paragea Grose-Smith, 1900 may be a full species

= Bematistes epaea =

Species of butterfly

Acraea epaea, formerly Bematistes epaea, the common bematistes, is a species of butterfly in the family Nymphalidae. It is found in Senegal, Guinea-Bissau, Sierra Leone, Liberia, Ivory Coast, Ghana, Togo, Benin, Nigeria, Cameroon, Equatorial Guinea, the Republic of the Congo, Angola, the Democratic Republic of the Congo, Sudan, Ethiopia, Uganda, Kenya, Tanzania, Malawi and Zambia.

== Description ==
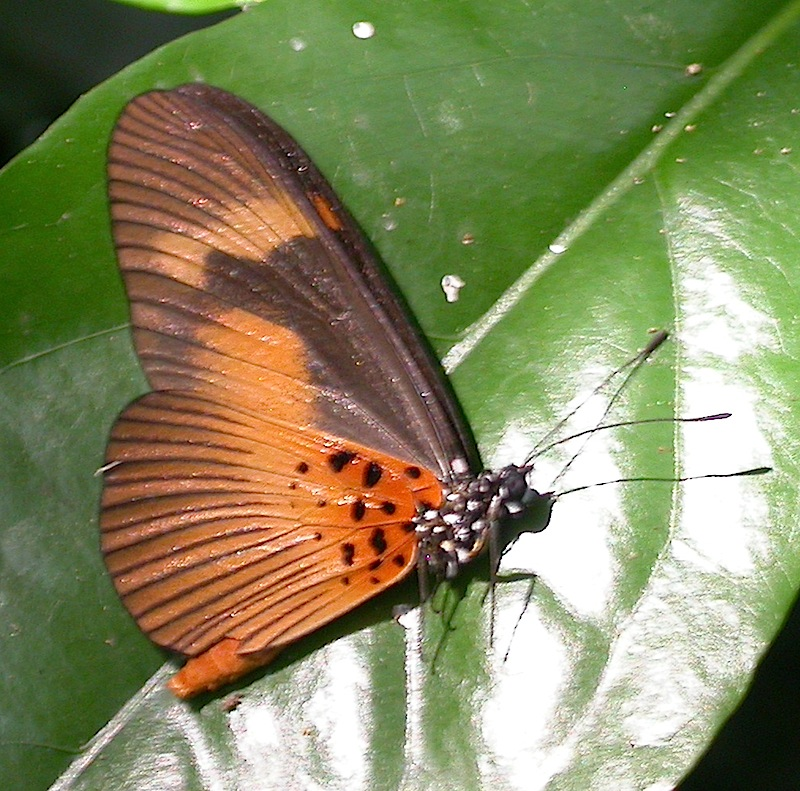

P. epaea is distinguished by having the hindmarginal spot of the forewing narrow and of fairly uniform breadth, at the hindmargin not or scarcely broader than half the hindmargin and not filling up the base of cellule 2, while the black marginal band on the upperside of the hindwing is in the d suddenly much widened at the apex, but in the female often very broad. On the under surface of the hinclwing the basal area is brighter red-yellow than the other parts of the wing. - epaea Cr. (58 a). male- Ground-colour of the hindwing above, hindmarginal spot and subapical band of the fore wing yellow-brown; hind wing beneath in the distal part more or less suffused with brown-grey and in the middle somewhat lighter. female Subapical band and hindmarginal spot of the forewing white and also a median band on the hindwing, 7 mm. in breadth, which forms a continuation of the hindmarginal spot of the forewing; the whole distal half of the hindwing, on the other hand, black-grey on both surfaces, with black veins and streaks. Senegambia to Angola and the upper Congo. -female -ab. lutosa Suff. is a female form which differs in having the white markings of the typical female light clay-yellow and the proximal part of the dark distal half of the hindwing above broadly light brown to dark yellow-brown or olive-brown; the pure black outer part of the distal half consequently retains almost the same shape as in the male. Cameroons to the Congo. - insularis Auriv. is a race in which the male only differs from the type-form in having the subapical band of the forewing whitish yellow above and white beneath; in the female the subapical band of the forewing is pure white, but the hindmarginal spot of the forewing and the hindwing are coloured and marked quite as in the male; the base of the hindwing beneath is light yellow instead of red- yellow. Island of Fernando Po. - melina Thur. is only known in the male; the light markings of the upper surface are dull ochre-yellow and the hindmarginal spot of the forewing is differently shaped, as its proximal side runs quite parallel with the costal margin and if produced would intersect the apex of the wing; in addition the distal side of the hindmarginal spot is bordered by two straight lines and forms a distinct angle. Nyassaland. - kivuana Jord. the markings of the forewing nearly as large as in the type-form, but the subapical band light cream-coloured and the hindmarginal spot light tan-yellow; the hindwing before the middle with a narrow yellowish white transverse band, not sharply defined distally; all the markings beneath yellowish white. -female : all the markings pure white; the subapical band of the fore wing narrower than in the type- form; the transverse band of the hindwing also narrower and more sharply defined. Island of Kwidgwi in Lake Kivu. - paragea Sm. (59c) is distinguished by having the markings very narrow and also in the male white; the subapical band of the forewing is only 1-2mm. in breadth and often almost broken up into spots; the hindmarginal spot is about 3 mm. in breadth and sometimes indistinct or obsolete at the hindmargin; the transverse band of the hindwing is 5mm. in breadth, sharply (or not sharply -- angustifasciata Grunb.) defined and not or scarcely extending beyond the apex of the cell. Uganda and Sesse Islands. - homochroa Jord. (59 e). Both sexes similarly coloured and marked and agreeing with the male of the type-form. The orange-yellow colour of the upper surface is somewhat lighter than in the type-form and the dark marginal band on the upperside of the hindwing is much narrower and terminates at the middle of the hindmargin. Abyssinia.

== Subspecies ==
- Acraea epaea epaea (Senegal, Guinea-Bissau, Liberia, Ivory Coast, Ghana, Togo, Nigeria, Cameroon, Congo, Angola, western Democratic Republic of the Congo, north-western Tanzania, Zambia)
- Acraea epaea angustifasciata d'Abrera, 1980 (central and southern Uganda, western Kenya)
- Acraea epaea bicolorata (Le Doux, 1937) (south-eastern Democratic Republic of the Congo)
- Acraea epaea epitellus Staudinger, 1896 (coast of Kenya, coast of Tanzania)
- Acraea epaea homochroa (Rothschild & Jordan, 1905) (southern Ethiopia)
- Acraea epaea insulana Ackery, 1995 (Bioko)
- Acraea epaea kivuana (Jordan, 1910) (Democratic Republic of the Congo: east to Kivu)
- Acraea epaea lutosa (Suffert, 1904) (eastern Democratic Republic of the Congo, Uganda: west to the Bwamba Valley)
- Acraea epaea melina (Thurau, 1903) (south-western Tanzania, Malawi: north to the shores of Lake Malawi)
- Acraea epaea paragea (Grose-Smith, 1900) (Sudan, western Uganda, western Kenya, north-western Tanzania)

Torben Larsen developed a species numbering system for his 2005 publication Butterflies of West Africa. The nominate subspecies is #1196. The 'Larsen' numbers have since been used with permission in A Sharp Eye on Butterflies of Ghana.

== Biology ==
The habitat consists of forests and dense Guinea savanna.

Both sexes are mimicked by Elymniopsis bammakoo, Pseudacraea eurytus and Mimacraea darwinia, while the female is also the model for the female of Papilio cynorta. Acraea jodutta is probably a co-mimic.

The larvae feed on Lindaeckeria schweinfurthii, Lindaeckeria dentata and Adenia cisampelloides.

== Taxonomy ==
See Pierre & Bernaud, 2014
