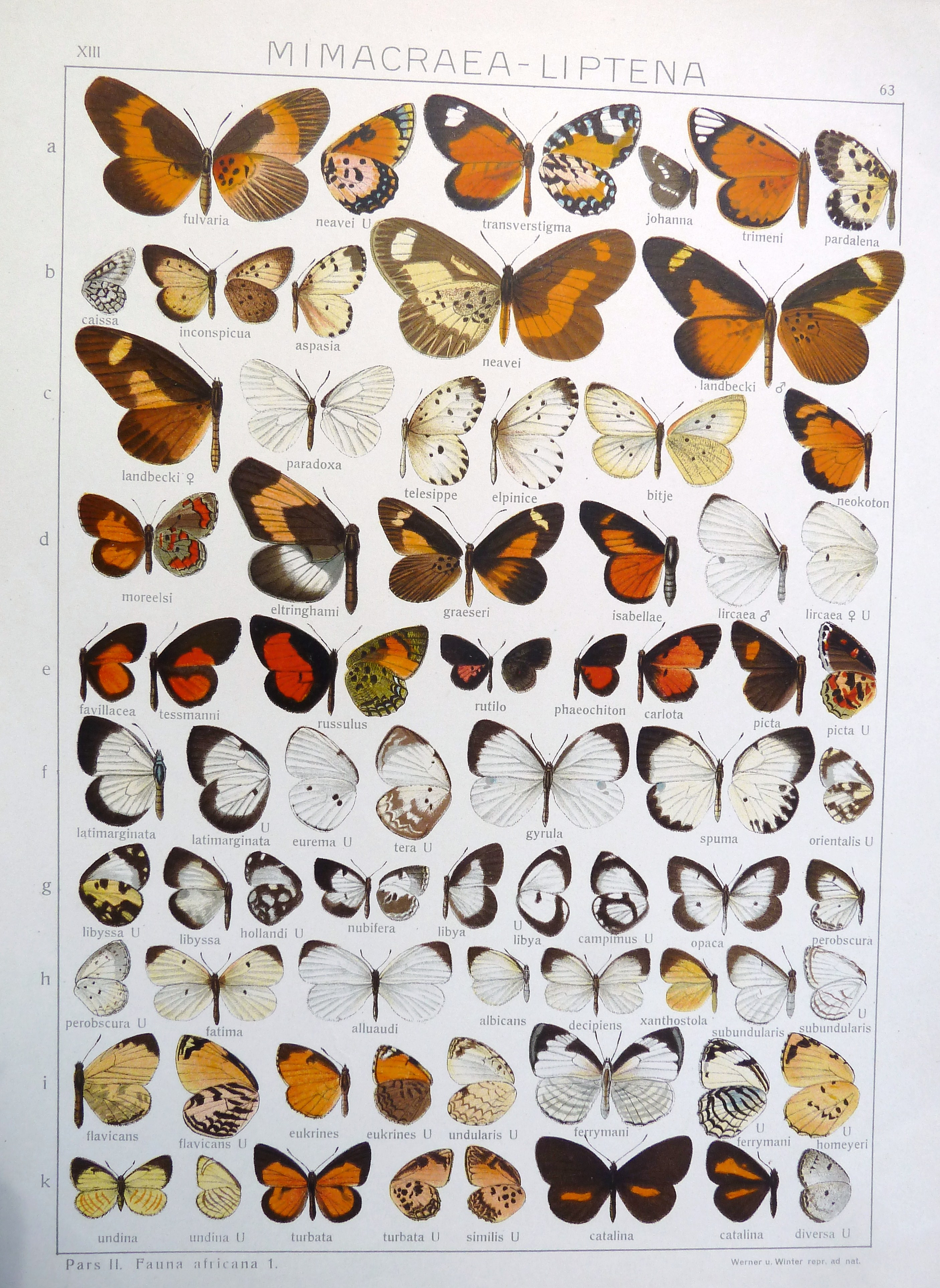
- Top left image from Adalbert Seitz's Fauna Africana

Scientific classification
- Domain: Eukaryota
- Kingdom: Animalia
- Phylum: Arthropoda
- Class: Insecta
- Order: Lepidoptera
- Family: Lycaenidae
- Genus: Mimacraea
- Species: M. fulvaria

Binomial name
- Mimacraea fulvaria Aurivillius, 1895

Synonyms
- Mimacraea neurata fulvaria; Mimacraea angustata Schultze, 1923; Mimacraea neurata fulvaria f. incurvata Talbot, 1935; Mimacraea neurata fulvaria f. lineata Talbot, 1935; Mimacraea eltringhami Druce, 1912; Mimacraea eltringhami burgeoni Hawker-Smith, 1928

= Mimacraea fulvaria =

Species of butterfly

Mimacraea fulvaria is a butterfly in the family Lycaenidae. It is found in the Republic of the Congo, the Democratic Republic of the Congo, Uganda and Tanzania. The habitat consists of dense forests.

Adults mimic Acraea aurivillii.

The larvae feed on algae growing on tree trunks.

== Subspecies ==
- Mimacraea fulvaria fulvaria (Congo, Democratic Republic of the Congo: Ubangi, Shaba and Kinshasa)
- Mimacraea fulvaria eltringhami Druce, 1912 (Uganda, Democratic Republic of the Congo, Tanzania)
