= Mimacraea marginata =

Scientific classification
- Kingdom: Animalia
- Phylum: Arthropoda
- Class: Insecta
- Order: Lepidoptera
- Family: Lycaenidae
- Genus: Mimacraea
- Species: M. marginata

Binomial name
- Mimacraea marginata Libert & Collins, 2000

Species of butterfly

Mimacraea marginata is a butterfly in the family Lycaenidae. It is found in Tanzania.
