= Mimacraea abriana =

Scientific classification
- Kingdom: Animalia
- Phylum: Arthropoda
- Clade: Pancrustacea
- Class: Insecta
- Order: Lepidoptera
- Family: Lycaenidae
- Genus: Mimacraea
- Species: M. abriana

Binomial name
- Mimacraea abriana Libert & Collins, 2000

Species of butterfly

Mimacraea abriana is a butterfly in the family Lycaenidae. It is found in the Republic of the Congo, the Democratic Republic of the Congo and the Central African Republic.
