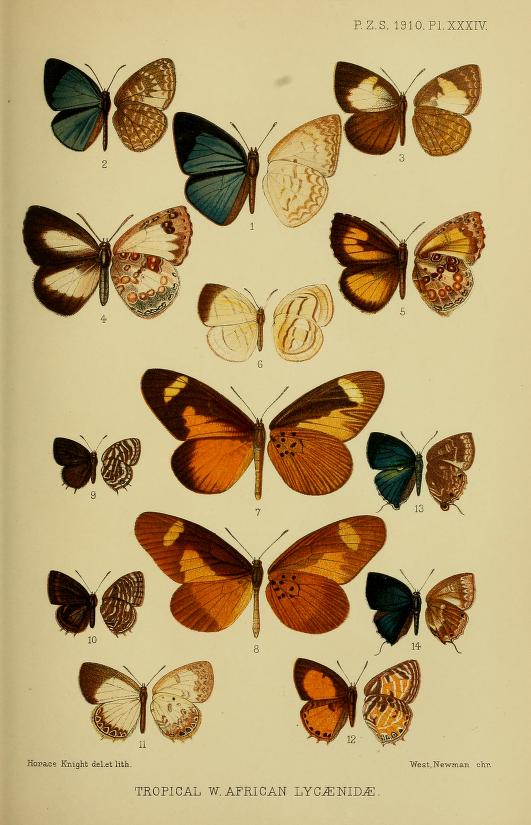
- Mimacraea landbecki figures 7 and 8

Scientific classification
- Domain: Eukaryota
- Kingdom: Animalia
- Phylum: Arthropoda
- Class: Insecta
- Order: Lepidoptera
- Family: Lycaenidae
- Subtribe: Mimacraeina
- Genus: Mimacraea; Butler, 1872

= Mimacraea =

Butterfly genus in family Lycaenidae

Mimacraea is a genus of butterflies in the family Lycaenidae. The species of this genus are endemic to the Afrotropical realm. As the name suggests, Mimacraea species are mimics of species in the genus Acraea and related genera.

== Species ==
- Mimacraea abriana Libert & Collins, 2000
- Mimacraea apicalis Grose-Smith & Kirby, 1889
- Mimacraea charmian Grose-Smith & Kirby, 1889
- Mimacraea costleyi Druce, 1912
- Mimacraea darwinia Butler, 1872
- Mimacraea febe Libert, 2000
- Mimacraea fulvaria Aurivillius, 1895
- Mimacraea gelinia (Oberthür, 1893)
- Mimacraea krausei Dewitz, 1889
- Mimacraea landbecki Druce, 1910
- Mimacraea maesseni Libert, 2000
- Mimacraea marginata Libert & Collins, 2000
- Mimacraea marshalli Trimen, 1898
- Mimacraea neavei Eltringham, 1909
- Mimacraea neokoton Druce, 1907
- Mimacraea neurata Holland, 1895
- Mimacraea paragora Rebel, 1911
- Mimacraea skoptoles Druce, 1907
- Mimacraea telloides Schultze, 1923
