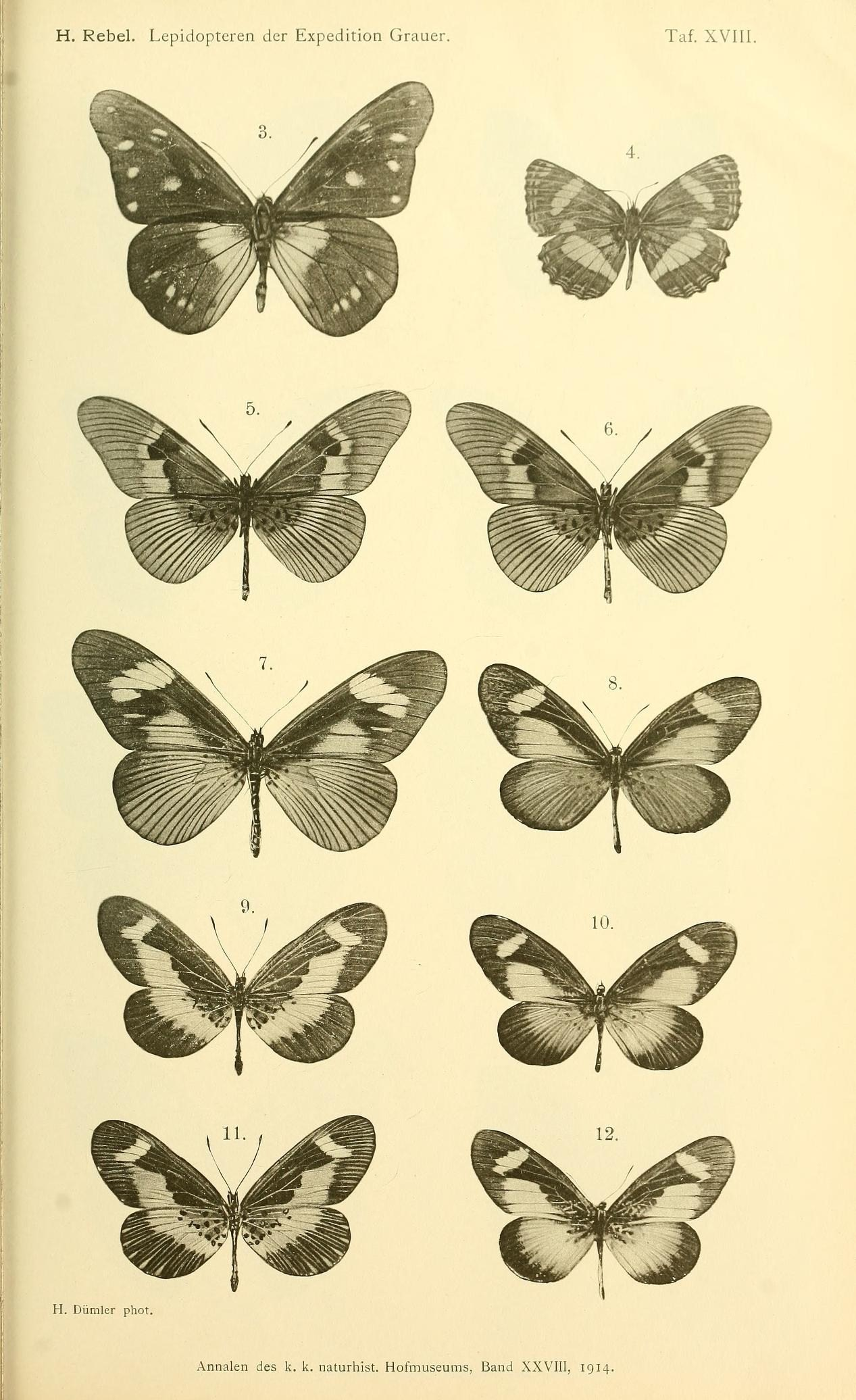
- Figure 10

Scientific classification
- Domain: Eukaryota
- Kingdom: Animalia
- Phylum: Arthropoda
- Class: Insecta
- Order: Lepidoptera
- Family: Lycaenidae
- Genus: Mimacraea
- Species: M. telloides

Binomial name
- Mimacraea telloides Schultze, 1923

Synonyms
- Mimacraea landbecki ab. flavescens Rebel, 1914; Mimacraea landbecki ab. latifasciata Rebel, 1914; Mimacraea mariae Dufrane, 1945

= Mimacraea telloides =

Species of butterfly

Mimacraea telloides is a butterfly in the family Lycaenidae. It is found in Cameroon and the Democratic Republic of the Congo.
