= Mimacraea costleyi =

Scientific classification
- Domain: Eukaryota
- Kingdom: Animalia
- Phylum: Arthropoda
- Class: Insecta
- Order: Lepidoptera
- Family: Lycaenidae
- Genus: Mimacraea
- Species: M. costleyi

Binomial name
- Mimacraea costleyi H. H. Druce, 1912

Species of butterfly

Mimacraea costleyi is a butterfly in the family Lycaenidae first described by Hamilton Herbert Druce in 1912. It is found in Malawi.
