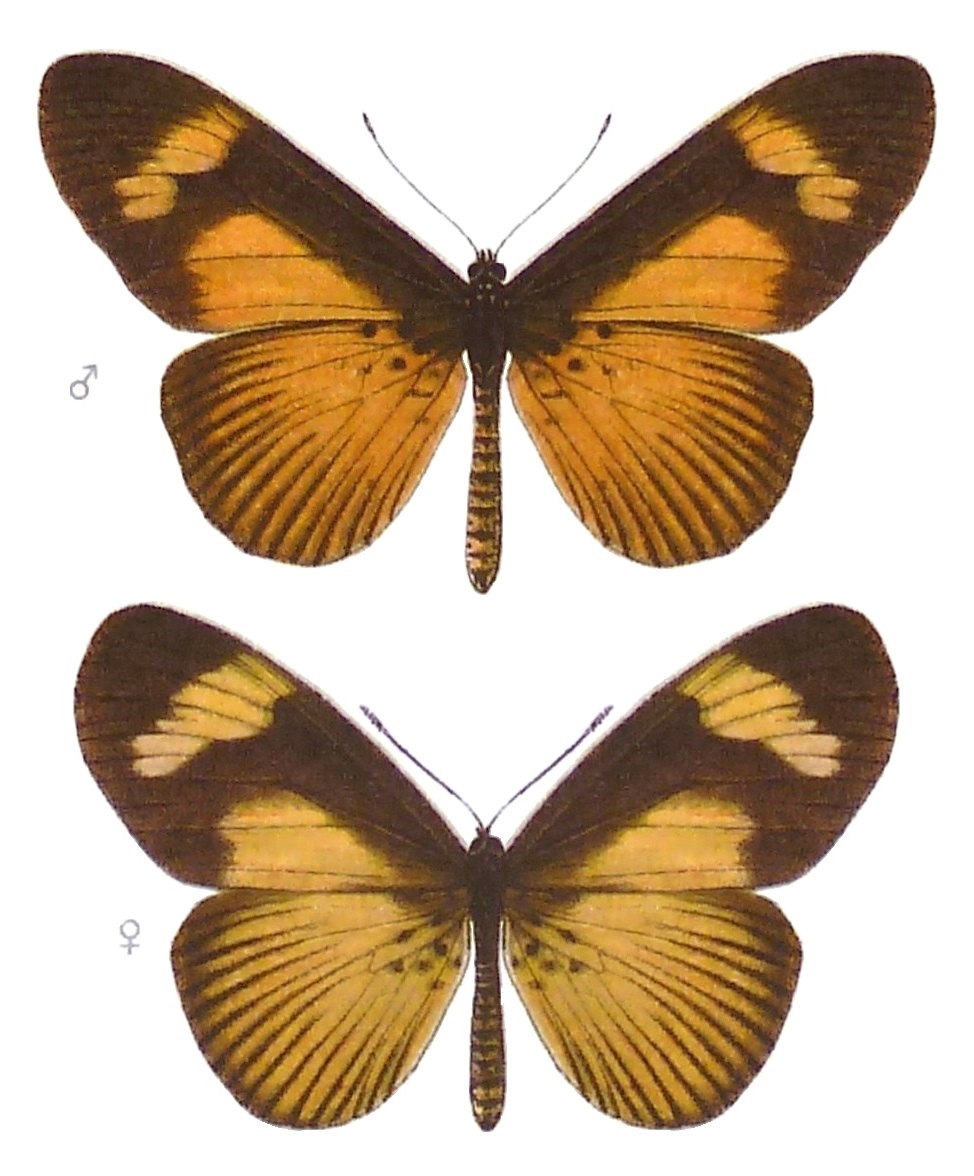
- From Adalbert Seitz's Fauna Africana

Scientific classification
- Kingdom: Animalia
- Phylum: Arthropoda
- Clade: Pancrustacea
- Class: Insecta
- Order: Lepidoptera
- Family: Nymphalidae
- Genus: Bematistes
- Species: B. tellus

Binomial name
- Bematistes tellus (Aurivillius, 1893)

Synonyms
- Planema tellus Aurivillius, 1893; Acraea tellus (Aurivillius, 1893); Acraea (Acraea) tellus; Planema epaea lustella Suffert, 1904; Planema tellus ab. subapicalis Strand, 1914; Planema tellus ab. albofasciata Neustetter, 1916; Planema tellus ab. helichta Neustetter, 1916; Planema tellus f. ferruginea Le Doux, 1937; Bematistes tellus tellus f. bernardi Berger, 1981; Planema tellus eumelis Jordan, 1910; Planmea schubotzi Grünberg, 1911

= Bematistes tellus =

Orange bematistes

Species of butterfly

Bematistes tellus, the orange bematistes, is a species of butterfly in the family Nymphalidae. It is found in Nigeria, Cameroon, Equatorial Guinea, the Republic of the Congo, the Democratic Republic of the Congo, Uganda and Tanzania.

== Description ==
P. tellus Auriv. (58 a). The hindmarginal spot of the forewing is broad, posteriorly much widened, at the hindmargin about 13mm. in breadth and hence covering far more than half of the hindmargin and also completely filling up the proximal part of cellule 2; the black marginal band on the upperside of the hindwing is about 4 mm. in breadth at the apex, becomes gradually narrower posteriorly, but reaches the anal angle; the subapical band of the forewing distally without sharp projection at vein 4. In the type-form the ground colour of the hindwing and the hindmarginal spot of the forewing are orange-yellow and the subapical band of the forewing somewhat lighter yellow and in cellule 5 in the male 5, in the female 7 mm. in breadth; females with white markings also occur, but are rare. In the male the cell of the forewing is often more or less filled up with orange-yellow on both surfaces. Cameroons to the Congo, male -ab. lustella Suff. differs in having the subapical band of the forewing united with the hindmarginal spot. - eumelis Jord. (= platyxantha Jord.) (59 a) is an eastern race, in which the subapical band of the forewing is somewhat broader and the hindmarginal spot smaller; the marginal band of the hindwing is narrower and the orange-yellow parts are lighter than in the type-form. Toro and Uganda. - P. schubotzi Grünb. Body as in P. tellus upperside of the forewing black, subapical band 5 mm. in breadth in cellule 5, white tinged with yellowish; hindmarginal spot as in tellus, bright ochre-yellow, 11 mm. in breadth at vein 2, 16.5 mm. at the hindmargin; hindwing bright ochre-yellow, the black marginal band very narrow, only 2–3 mm. in breadth at the apex and scarcely reaching vein 3; the black basal spots of the under surface showing through faintly, the black veins and interneural stripes narrow. Under surface of the forewing black, subapical band white, apex and distal margin to before the hinder angle sprinkled with ochre-yellow scales; hindwing beneath with cpiite uniform ochre-yellow ground-colour without marginal band. In the female the subapical band and the hindmarginal spot of the forewing are pure white on both surfaces, the subapical band is 8 mm. in breadth in cellule 5 and the hindmarginal spot not widened posteriorly, 11.5 mm in breadth at vein 2 and at the hindmargin, at the latter faintly edged with ochre-yellow on each side; the hindwing as in the male but the marginal band broader, 3.5 mm. in breadth at the apex and reaching to vein 2; the under surface also almost entirely as in the male. In the interior of the Congo region.

== Subspecies ==
- Bematistes tellus tellus — Nigeria, Cameroon, Equatorial Guinea, Congo, Democratic Republic of the Congo
- Bematistes tellus eumelis (Jordan, 1910) — central and eastern Uganda, north-western Tanzania
- Bematistes tellus schubotzi (Grünberg, 1911) — Democratic Republic of the Congo: Ituri and northern Kivu, Uganda: west to Bwamba

== Biology ==
The habitat consists of forests.

It is mimicked by males of Mimacraea apicalis.

The larvae feed on Adenia species.

== Taxonomy ==
See Pierre & Bernaud, 2014
