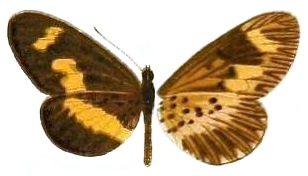

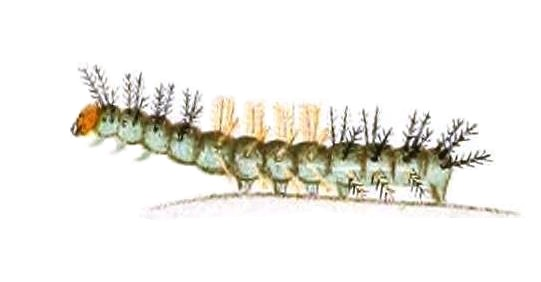
- Imago in Seitz (1925) and larva in Eltringham (1912)

Scientific classification
- Kingdom: Animalia
- Phylum: Arthropoda
- Class: Insecta
- Order: Lepidoptera
- Family: Nymphalidae
- Genus: Acraea
- Species: A. oberthueri

Binomial name
- Acraea oberthueri Butler, 1895

Synonyms
- Acraea (Actinote) oberthueri; Acraea oberthuri; Acraea oberthueri confluens Suffert, 1904; Acraea oberthueri var. laetopicta Rebel, 1914; Acrea oberthuri var. confluens Schouteden, 1919; Acraea oberthueri ab. ornata Schultze, 1923; Acraea oberthueri f. kuntzeni Le Doux, 1923

= Acraea oberthueri =

Oberthuer's acraea

Species of butterfly

Acraea oberthueri, Oberthuer's acraea, is a butterfly in the family Nymphalidae. It is found in Nigeria, Cameroon, Equatorial Guinea (Mbini and Bioko), the Republic of the Congo, the southern and eastern part of the Democratic Republic of the Congo and western Tanzania.

== Description ==
A. oberthueri Btlr. (56 c, d) may be easily known by the numerous free basal and discal dots on the under surface of the hindwing. The upper surface is blackish brown-grey with the usual markings light ochre-yellow; cell of the forewing without light markings; subapical band composed of three spots in cellules 4 to 6; hindmarginal spot narrow and of almost uniform breadth, composed of spots in 1a, 1b, 2 (and 3), the spot in 2 not covering the base of the cellule. Hindwing with an ochre-yellow median band, which is as broad as the hindmarginal spot of the fore wing and joins on to this spot; the distal part has more or less distinct longitudinal stripes, corresponding to those of the under surface. The distal half of the under surface between the veins with thick black rays, which are bifurcate at the distal margin and are separated from the veins by light lines. Nigeria to the Congo.

- In ab. confluens Suff. the subapical band of the forewing is joined to the hindmarginal spot in cellule 3. Among the type-form.
- Larva slate-grey with red-yellow head, the spines of segments 2 to 5 and the upper spines of segments 10 to 13 black; those of segments 6 to 9 and the lower ones on segments 10 to 13 yellowish; lives on one of the Tiliaceae, Ancistrocarpus densispinosus.
- Pupa white with two dorsal and two lateral rows of orange-yellow, black-ringed spots and black lines on the wing-cases.

== Biology ==
The habitat consists of dense forests and mature secondary growth.

It is mimicked by females of Mimacraea apicalis.

The larvae feed on Ancistrocarpus densispinosus and Grewia species.

== Taxonomy ==
It is a member of the Acraea oberthueri species group. – but see also Pierre & Bernaud, 2014

== Etymology ==
The specific epithet honours Charles Oberthür.
