= Euphaedra cinnamomea =

Scientific classification
- Kingdom: Animalia
- Phylum: Arthropoda
- Class: Insecta
- Order: Lepidoptera
- Family: Nymphalidae
- Genus: Euphaedra
- Species: E. cinnamomea

Binomial name
- Euphaedra cinnamomea Rothschild, 1918

Synonyms
- Euphaedra preussi f. cinnamomea Rothschild, 1918; Euphaedra (Euphaedrana) cinnamomea

Species of butterfly

Euphaedra cinnamomea is a butterfly in the family Nymphalidae. It is found in the Democratic Republic of the Congo.

Described as a form of Euphaedra preussi form. nov. Male Has above all the green areas cinnamon colour washed with blue, and a large patch of blue above tornal area of hindwing. Habitat. Kongour Forest, Manyema, Congo Free State (R. Grauer), 1 male.

== Taxonomy ==
Raised to species by Hecq Euphaedra cinnamomea Rothschild, 1918. Seen as a synonym of Euphaedra castanea Berger, 1981 in Ackery et al.
