= Euphaedra katangensis =

Scientific classification
- Kingdom: Animalia
- Phylum: Arthropoda
- Class: Insecta
- Order: Lepidoptera
- Family: Nymphalidae
- Genus: Euphaedra
- Species: E. katangensis

Binomial name
- Euphaedra katangensis Talbot, 1927

Synonyms
- Euphaedra cooksoni katangensis Talbot, 1927; Euphaedra (Euphaedrana) katangensis

Species of butterfly

Euphaedra katangensis is a butterfly in the family Nymphalidae. It is found in the Democratic Republic of the Congo and Zambia. It was described as a subspecies of Euphaedra cooksoni.
