= Euphaedra hebes =

- male, Kakum National Park, Ghana

Scientific classification
- Kingdom: Animalia
- Phylum: Arthropoda
- Clade: Pancrustacea
- Class: Insecta
- Order: Lepidoptera
- Family: Nymphalidae
- Genus: Euphaedra
- Species: E. hebes

Binomial name
- Euphaedra hebes Hecq, 1980

Synonyms
- Euphaedra (Xypetana) hebes

Species of butterfly

Euphaedra hebes, the hebes pink forester, is a butterfly in the family Nymphalidae. It is found in north-eastern Guinea, Liberia, Ivory Coast, Ghana, Nigeria, Cameroon and Gabon. The habitat consists of wetter forests.

Torben Larsen developed a species numbering system for his 2005 publication Butterflies of West Africa. This species is #1057. The 'Larsen' numbers have since been used with permission in A Sharp Eye on Butterflies of Ghana.
