= Euphaedra jacksoni =

Scientific classification
- Kingdom: Animalia
- Phylum: Arthropoda
- Class: Insecta
- Order: Lepidoptera
- Family: Nymphalidae
- Genus: Euphaedra
- Species: E. jacksoni

Binomial name
- Euphaedra jacksoni Hecq, 1980

Synonyms
- Euphaedra (Euphaedrana) jacksoni

Species of butterfly

Euphaedra jacksoni is a butterfly in the family Nymphalidae. It is found in Gabon and the Republic of the Congo.
