= Euphaedra dargei =

Scientific classification
- Kingdom: Animalia
- Phylum: Arthropoda
- Class: Insecta
- Order: Lepidoptera
- Family: Nymphalidae
- Genus: Euphaedra
- Species: E. dargei

Binomial name
- Euphaedra dargei Hecq, 1975

Synonyms
- Euphaedra (Xypetana) dargei

Species of butterfly

Euphaedra dargei is a butterfly in the family Nymphalidae. It is found in Cameroon.
