= Euphaedra intermedia =

Scientific classification
- Kingdom: Animalia
- Phylum: Arthropoda
- Class: Insecta
- Order: Lepidoptera
- Family: Nymphalidae
- Genus: Euphaedra
- Species: E. intermedia

Binomial name
- Euphaedra intermedia Rebel, 1914

Synonyms
- Euphaedra sarita f. intermedia Rebel, 1914; Euphaedrax (Euphaedrana) intermedia; Euphaedra preussi f. obsoleta Joicey and Talbot, 1921

Species of butterfly

Euphaedra intermedia is a butterfly in the family Nymphalidae. It is found in the Democratic Republic of the Congo (northern Kivu, Uele).

It was described as a form of Euphaedra sarita."The very large females, which agree with the male in the drawing of the underside, usually have a white, more rarely blue darkened subapical band on the upper side. This form, which cannot be combined either with sarita or with inanum, may bear the name Intermedia (n. f.). Rebel loc.cit. It was raised to species level by Hecq
