= Euphaedra overlaeti =

Scientific classification
- Kingdom: Animalia
- Phylum: Arthropoda
- Class: Insecta
- Order: Lepidoptera
- Family: Nymphalidae
- Genus: Euphaedra
- Species: E. overlaeti

Binomial name
- Euphaedra overlaeti Hulstaert, 1926

Synonyms
- Euphaedra (Euphaedrana) overlaeti

Species of butterfly

Euphaedra overlaeti is a butterfly in the family Nymphalidae. It is found in the Democratic Republic of the Congo (Shaba and Lualaba) and north-western Zambia.
