= Euphaedra lupercoides =

Scientific classification
- Kingdom: Animalia
- Phylum: Arthropoda
- Class: Insecta
- Order: Lepidoptera
- Family: Nymphalidae
- Genus: Euphaedra
- Species: E. lupercoides

Binomial name
- Euphaedra lupercoides Rothschild, 1918

Synonyms
- Euphaedra (Proteuphaedra) lupercoides

Species of butterfly

Euphaedra lupercoides is a butterfly in the family Nymphalidae first described by Walter Rothschild in 1918. It is found in the Republic of the Congo, the Democratic Republic of the Congo and the Central African Republic.

== Original description ==
Male Above forewing velvety black suffused with deep blue; basal one-third irregularly obliquely metallic pale steel-green, an oblique buffish-white band in outer one-third, apical patch white, smaller than in luperca. Hindwing metallic pale steel-green; abdominal area dull brown, terminal one-fifth of wing steel-blue. Below olive-green washed with pinkish brown; markings as in luperca all below vein 2 on forewings cinnamon colour.Habitat. Luebo, Kassai River, October 1903 (Landbeck), 1 male.
