= Euphaedra vulnerata =

Scientific classification
- Kingdom: Animalia
- Phylum: Arthropoda
- Clade: Pancrustacea
- Class: Insecta
- Order: Lepidoptera
- Family: Nymphalidae
- Genus: Euphaedra
- Species: E. vulnerata

Binomial name
- Euphaedra vulnerata Schultze, 1916

Species of butterfly

Euphaedra vulnerata is a butterfly in the family Nymphalidae. It is found in Cameroon and Equatorial Guinea (Bioko).
