= Euphaedra graueri =

Scientific classification
- Kingdom: Animalia
- Phylum: Arthropoda
- Class: Insecta
- Order: Lepidoptera
- Family: Nymphalidae
- Genus: Euphaedra
- Species: E. graueri

Binomial name
- Euphaedra graueri Rothschild, 1918

Synonyms
- Euphaedra (Xypetana) graueri

Species of butterfly

Euphaedra graueri is a butterfly in the family Nymphalidae. It is found in the eastern part of the Democratic Republic of the Congo.

== Description ==
The original description reads Euphaedra graueri sp. nov.

Male and female ground-colour above deep velvety blue-black. Forewing basal two-fifths obliquely steel-blue, a postmedian broad oblique orange band consisting of two large quadrate patches joined corner to corner, fringe at apex whitish, and elsewhere black with white intranervular dots.

Hindwing basal three-fourths steel-blue.

Below forewing olivaceous grass-green freckled with black scales; 3 black spots in cell, a postdiscal, somewhat dilute black transverse band, oblique transverse orange band paler. Hindwing olivaceous grass-green freckled with black scales; 2 black spots in cell and a black streak on discocellulars, postdiscal band as on forewing, a dark rose-crimson transverse band from costa to beyond vein 3 beyond cell, which curves round and reaches base of wing, the horizontal portion being each side of vein 1, a black line on inner side of the transverse portion of the crimson band.

Length of forewing: male 39 mm., female 48 mm. Expanse: male 83 mm., female 101 mm.

Habitat. Forest 90 km. west of Lake Albert Edward, February 1908, 1,600 m. (R. Grauer), 1 male, 2 females.

== Etymology ==
The specific epithet honours Rudolf Grauer.
