= Euphaedra persephona =

Scientific classification
- Kingdom: Animalia
- Phylum: Arthropoda
- Class: Insecta
- Order: Lepidoptera
- Family: Nymphalidae
- Genus: Euphaedra
- Species: E. persephona

Binomial name
- Euphaedra persephona Hecq, 1983

Synonyms
- Euphaedra proserpina persephona Hecq, 1983; Euphaedra (Euphaedrana) persephona

Species of butterfly

Euphaedra persephona is a butterfly in the family Nymphalidae. It is found in the Douala region of Cameroon.
