= Euphaedra limbourgi =

Scientific classification
- Kingdom: Animalia
- Phylum: Arthropoda
- Class: Insecta
- Order: Lepidoptera
- Family: Nymphalidae
- Genus: Euphaedra
- Species: E. limbourgi

Binomial name
- Euphaedra limbourgi Oremans, 2006

Species of butterfly

Euphaedra limbourgi is a butterfly in the family Nymphalidae. It is found in Gabon.
