= Euphaedra thalie =

Scientific classification
- Kingdom: Animalia
- Phylum: Arthropoda
- Class: Insecta
- Order: Lepidoptera
- Family: Nymphalidae
- Genus: Euphaedra
- Species: E. thalie

Binomial name
- Euphaedra thalie Hecq, 1981

Synonyms
- Euphaedra (Gausapia) thalie; Euphaedra thalie f. kainama Hecq, 2004

Species of butterfly

Euphaedra thalie is a butterfly in the family Nymphalidae. It is found from the Uele in the Democratic Republic of the Congo.

== Similar species ==
Other members of the Euphaedra zaddachii species group q.v.
