= Euphaedra jacqueshecqui =

Scientific classification
- Kingdom: Animalia
- Phylum: Arthropoda
- Class: Insecta
- Order: Lepidoptera
- Family: Nymphalidae
- Genus: Euphaedra
- Species: E. jacqueshecqui

Binomial name
- Euphaedra jacqueshecqui Bollino, 1998

Synonyms
- Euphaedra (Xypetana) jacqueshecqui

Species of butterfly

Euphaedra jacqueshecqui is a butterfly in the family Nymphalidae. It is found in the area of the former province of Équateur in the Democratic Republic of Congo.
