= Euphaedra brevis =

Scientific classification
- Kingdom: Animalia
- Phylum: Arthropoda
- Class: Insecta
- Order: Lepidoptera
- Family: Nymphalidae
- Genus: Euphaedra
- Species: E. brevis

Binomial name
- Euphaedra brevis Hecq, 1977

Synonyms
- Euphaedra (Xypetana) brevis

Species of butterfly

Euphaedra brevis is a butterfly in the family Nymphalidae. It is found in Cameroon and from Equatorial Guinea to the Democratic Republic of the Congo.
