= Euphaedra regisleopoldi =

Scientific classification
- Kingdom: Animalia
- Phylum: Arthropoda
- Class: Insecta
- Order: Lepidoptera
- Family: Nymphalidae
- Genus: Euphaedra
- Species: E. regisleopoldi

Binomial name
- Euphaedra regisleopoldi Hecq, 1996

Synonyms
- Euphaedra regis-leopoldi Hecq, 1996; Euphaedra (Euphaedrana) regisleopoldi

Species of butterfly

Euphaedra regisleopoldi is a butterfly in the family Nymphalidae. It is found in the central part of the Democratic Republic of the Congo.
