= Euphaedra grilloti =

Scientific classification
- Kingdom: Animalia
- Phylum: Arthropoda
- Class: Insecta
- Order: Lepidoptera
- Family: Nymphalidae
- Genus: Euphaedra
- Species: E. grilloti

Binomial name
- Euphaedra grilloti Hecq, 1983

Synonyms
- Euphaedra (Euphaedrana) grilloti

Species of butterfly

Euphaedra grilloti is a butterfly in the family Nymphalidae. It is found in the north-eastern part of the Democratic Republic of the Congo and the Republic of the Congo (Mbamu island). It is known only from the type locality Congo: Congo Brazzaville, Ile M’Bamou and a locality in DRC.It is in the Euphaedra ceres group of species.
