= Euphaedra solida =

Scientific classification
- Kingdom: Animalia
- Phylum: Arthropoda
- Class: Insecta
- Order: Lepidoptera
- Family: Nymphalidae
- Genus: Euphaedra
- Species: E. solida

Binomial name
- Euphaedra solida Hecq, 1997

Synonyms
- Euphaedra (Euphaedrana) solida

Species of butterfly

Euphaedra solida is a butterfly in the family Nymphalidae. It is found in the Democratic Republic of the Congo.
