= Euphaedra aubergeri =

Scientific classification
- Kingdom: Animalia
- Phylum: Arthropoda
- Class: Insecta
- Order: Lepidoptera
- Family: Nymphalidae
- Genus: Euphaedra
- Species: E. aubergeri

Binomial name
- Euphaedra aubergeri Hecq, 1977

Synonyms
- Euphaedra (Proteuphaedra) aubergeri

Species of butterfly

Euphaedra aubergeri, or Auberger's forester, is a butterfly in the family Nymphalidae. It is found in north-western Ivory Coast. The habitat consists of forests. Images: Types Royal Museum Central Africa
