= Euphaedra pallas =

Scientific classification
- Kingdom: Animalia
- Phylum: Arthropoda
- Class: Insecta
- Order: Lepidoptera
- Family: Nymphalidae
- Genus: Euphaedra
- Species: E. pallas

Binomial name
- Euphaedra pallas Hecq, 2004

Synonyms
- Euphaedra (Gausapia) pallas

Species of butterfly

Euphaedra pallas is a butterfly in the family Nymphalidae. It is found in Guinea.

== Similar species ==
Other members of the Euphaedra zaddachii species group q.v.
