= Euphaedra piriformis =

Scientific classification
- Kingdom: Animalia
- Phylum: Arthropoda
- Class: Insecta
- Order: Lepidoptera
- Family: Nymphalidae
- Genus: Euphaedra
- Species: E. piriformis

Binomial name
- Euphaedra piriformis Hecq, 1982

Synonyms
- Euphaedra (Euphaedrana) piriformis

Species of butterfly

Euphaedra piriformis, the per-banded Themis forester, is a butterfly in the family Nymphalidae. It is found in Cameroon, Gabon, the Republic of the Congo and the Democratic Republic of the Congo (Kinshasa). The habitat consists of wet forests.
