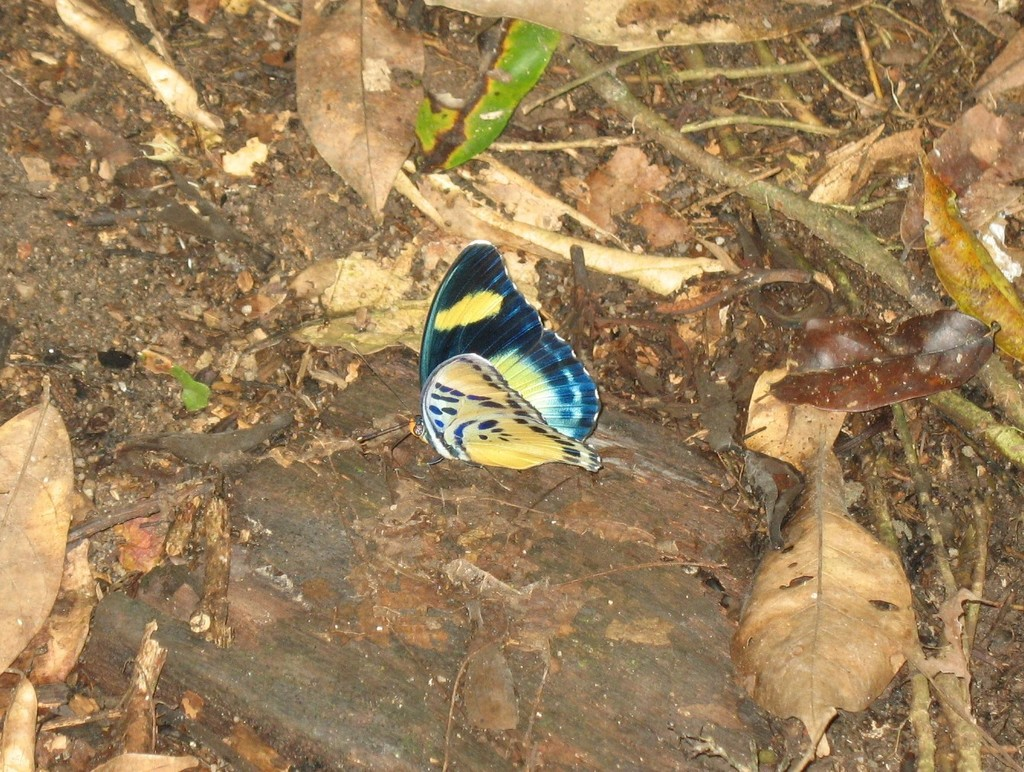

Scientific classification
- Kingdom: Animalia
- Phylum: Arthropoda
- Class: Insecta
- Order: Lepidoptera
- Family: Nymphalidae
- Genus: Euphaedra
- Species: E. demeter

Binomial name
- Euphaedra demeter Hecq, 1983

Synonyms
- Euphaedra (Euphaedrana) demeter

= Euphaedra demeter =

Species of butterfly

Euphaedra demeter, the Demeter Ceres forester, is a butterfly in the family Nymphalidae. It is found in Nigeria, Cameroon and the Republic of the Congo. The habitat consists of forests.
