= Euphaedra grandis =

Scientific classification
- Kingdom: Animalia
- Phylum: Arthropoda
- Clade: Pancrustacea
- Class: Insecta
- Order: Lepidoptera
- Family: Nymphalidae
- Genus: Euphaedra
- Species: E. grandis

Binomial name
- Euphaedra grandis Hecq, 1980

Synonyms
- Euphaedra (Xypetana) grandis

Species of butterfly

Euphaedra grandis is a butterfly in the family Nymphalidae. It is found in the Democratic Republic of the Congo (Shaba).
