= Euphaedra camiadei =

Scientific classification
- Kingdom: Animalia
- Phylum: Arthropoda
- Clade: Pancrustacea
- Class: Insecta
- Order: Lepidoptera
- Family: Nymphalidae
- Genus: Euphaedra
- Species: E. camiadei

Binomial name
- Euphaedra camiadei Hecq, 2004

Synonyms
- Euphaedra (Xypetana) camiadei

Species of butterfly

Euphaedra camiadei is a butterfly in the family Nymphalidae. It is found in the Central African Republic.
