= Euphaedra ducarmei =

Scientific classification
- Kingdom: Animalia
- Phylum: Arthropoda
- Class: Insecta
- Order: Lepidoptera
- Family: Nymphalidae
- Genus: Euphaedra
- Species: E. ducarmei

Binomial name
- Euphaedra ducarmei Hecq, 1977

Synonyms
- Euphaedra (Gausapia) ducarmei

Species of butterfly

Euphaedra ducarmei is a butterfly in the family Nymphalidae. It is found in the Democratic Republic of the Congo (northern Kivu).
