= Euphaedra fascinata =

Scientific classification
- Kingdom: Animalia
- Phylum: Arthropoda
- Class: Insecta
- Order: Lepidoptera
- Family: Nymphalidae
- Genus: Euphaedra
- Species: E. fascinata

Binomial name
- Euphaedra fascinata Hecq, 1984

Synonyms
- Euphaedra (Euphaedrana) fascinata; Euphaedra eleus f. coerulea Joicey and Talbot, 1921; Euphaedra eleus eleus ab. kataphraktar Birket-Smith, 1960

Species of butterfly

Euphaedra fascinata is a butterfly in the family Nymphalidae. It is found in Cameroon, the Republic of the Congo, the Central African Republic and the Democratic Republic of the Congo.
