= Euphaedra xerophila =

Scientific classification
- Kingdom: Animalia
- Phylum: Arthropoda
- Class: Insecta
- Order: Lepidoptera
- Family: Nymphalidae
- Genus: Euphaedra
- Species: E. xerophila

Binomial name
- Euphaedra xerophila Hecq, 1974

Synonyms
- Euphaedra (Euphaedrana) xerophila

Species of butterfly

Euphaedra xerophila is a butterfly in the family Nymphalidae. It is found in southern Kivu in the Democratic Republic of the Congo.
