= Euphaedra thierrybaulini =

Scientific classification
- Kingdom: Animalia
- Phylum: Arthropoda
- Class: Insecta
- Order: Lepidoptera
- Family: Nymphalidae
- Genus: Euphaedra
- Species: E. thierrybaulini

Binomial name
- Euphaedra thierrybaulini Oremans, 1999

Synonyms
- Euphaedra (Euphaedrana) thierrybaulini

Species of butterfly

Euphaedra thierrybaulini is a butterfly in the family Nymphalidae. It is found in the Democratic Republic of the Congo (Bandundu, Kikwit, eastern Kasai).
