= Euphaedra mayumbensis =

Scientific classification
- Kingdom: Animalia
- Phylum: Arthropoda
- Class: Insecta
- Order: Lepidoptera
- Family: Nymphalidae
- Genus: Euphaedra
- Species: E. mayumbensis

Binomial name
- Euphaedra mayumbensis Hecq, 1984

Synonyms
- Euphaedra (Euphaedrana) mayumbensis

Species of butterfly

Euphaedra mayumbensis is a butterfly in the family Nymphalidae. It is found in the Democratic Republic of the Congo (Mayumbe) and the western part of the Central African Republic.
