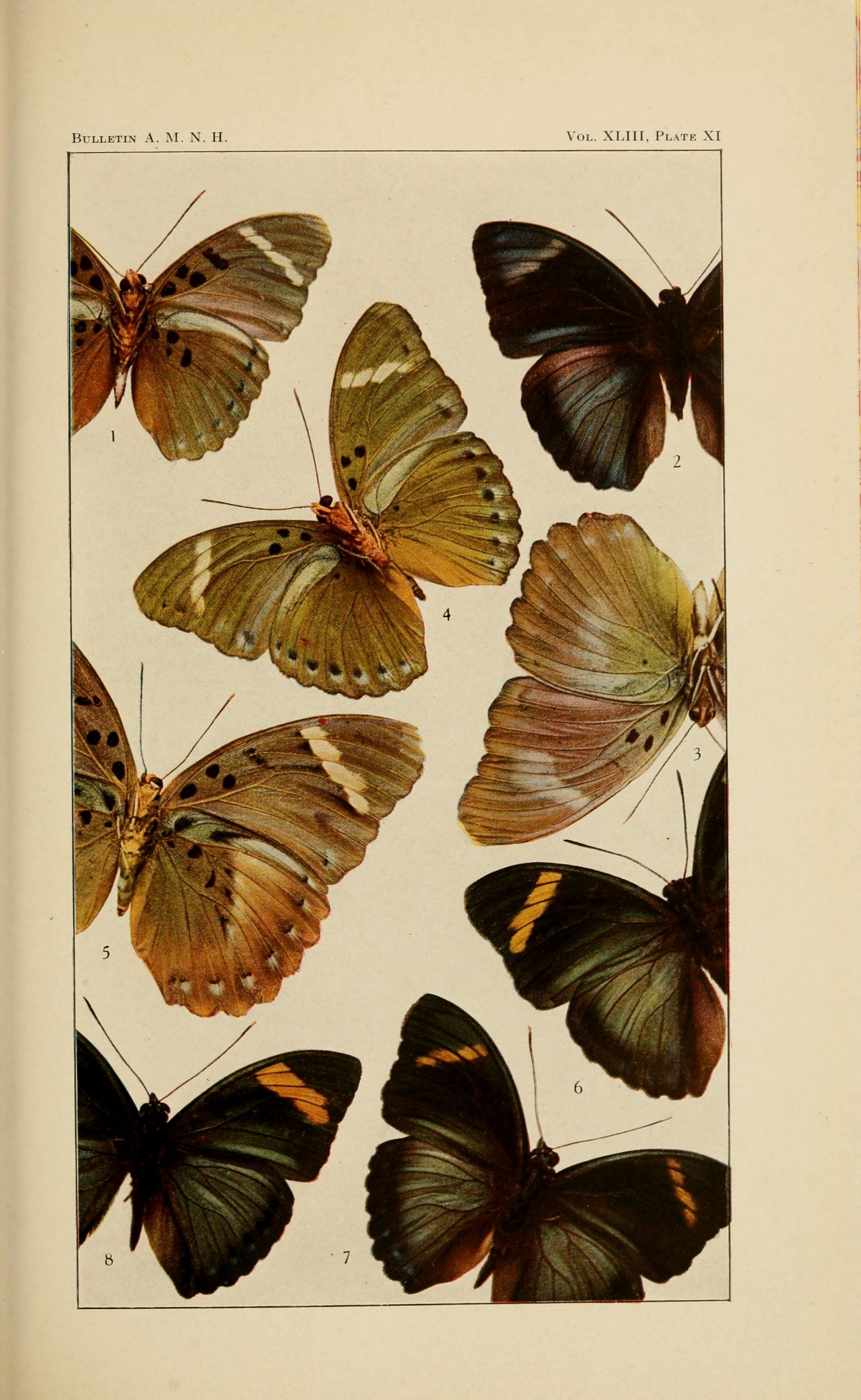
- Figure 6

Scientific classification
- Kingdom: Animalia
- Phylum: Arthropoda
- Class: Insecta
- Order: Lepidoptera
- Family: Nymphalidae
- Genus: Euphaedra
- Species: E. fulvofasciata

Binomial name
- Euphaedra fulvofasciata Holland, 1920

Synonyms
- Euphaedra (Euphaedrana) fulvofasciata; Euphaedra preussi var. fulvofasciata Holland, 1920; Euphaedra preussi var. angustior Holland, 1920

= Euphaedra fulvofasciata =

Species of butterfly

Euphaedra fulvofasciata is a butterfly in the family Nymphalidae. It is found in Cameroon and the Democratic Republic of the Congo (Uele and Kivu).

Euphedra preussi fulvofasciata, is a new variety in Plate XI, Figure 6 and 7. This variety differs from the preceding in having the transverse subapical band on the upper sides of the primaries bright orange in both sexes. The band on the underside is paler, inclining to white, although in some specimens, the orange color of the upper side reappears. There is a considerable variety in the shape of this band, especially in the females. Among seven female specimen, none have the band absolutely identical in outline, and some have a much broader band than others. The markings on the under side are more or less variable, as in njamnjami [Euphaedra preussi var. njamnjami Staudinger, 1891] and the other varietal forms which have been mentioned.

== Taxonomy ==
Euphaedra fulvofasciata was raised to species level by Hecq
