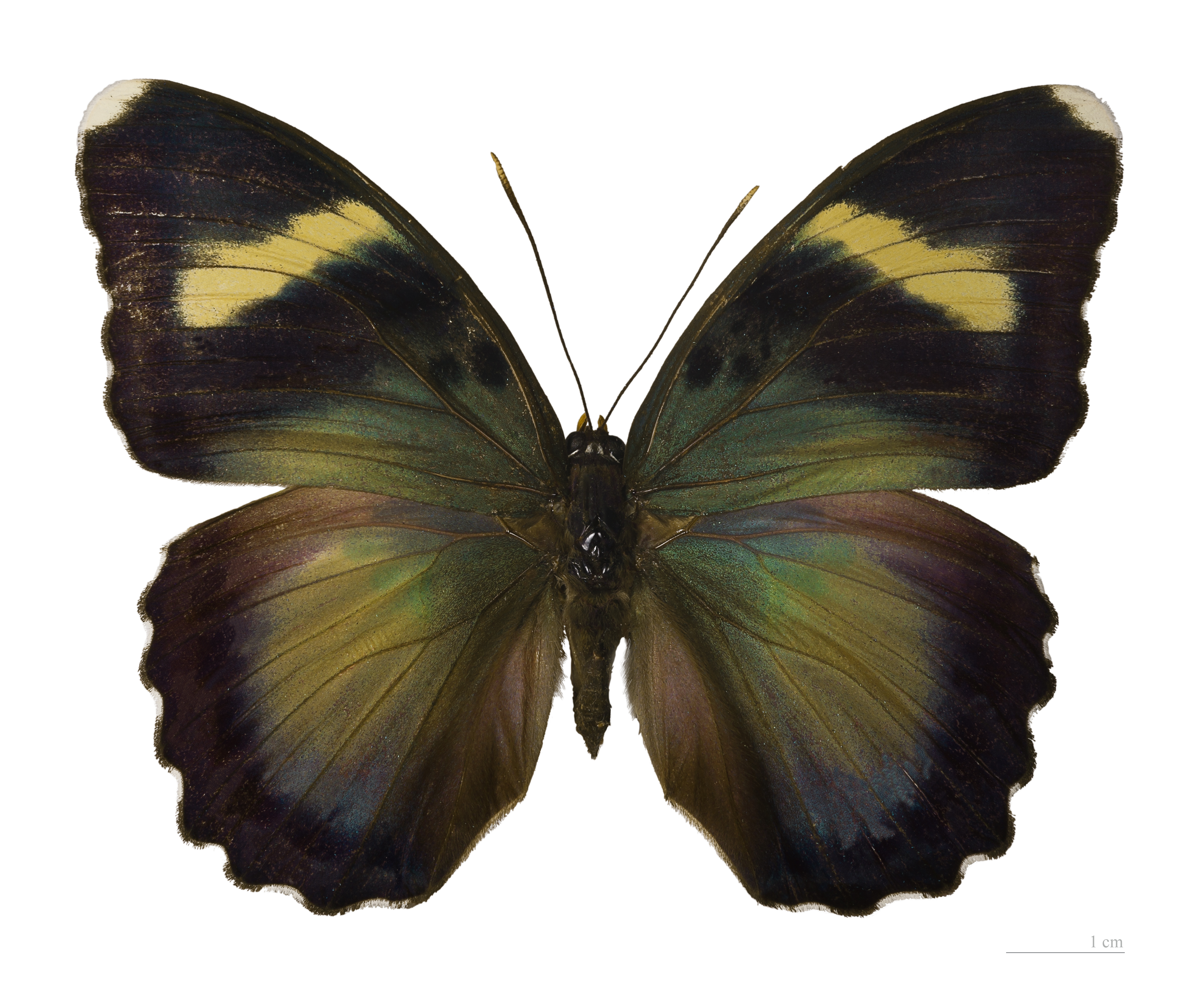

Scientific classification
- Kingdom: Animalia
- Phylum: Arthropoda
- Clade: Pancrustacea
- Class: Insecta
- Order: Lepidoptera
- Family: Nymphalidae
- Genus: Euphaedra
- Species: E. cuypersiana

Binomial name
- Euphaedra cuypersiana Hecq, 2006

= Euphaedra cuypersiana =

Species of butterfly

Euphaedra cuypersiana is a butterfly in the family Nymphalidae. It is found in the Democratic Republic of the Congo.The name Euphaedra cuypersiana comes from the genus Euphaedra and somebody named cuypers.
