= Euphaedra luteolucens =

Scientific classification
- Kingdom: Animalia
- Phylum: Arthropoda
- Clade: Pancrustacea
- Class: Insecta
- Order: Lepidoptera
- Family: Nymphalidae
- Genus: Euphaedra
- Species: E. luteolucens

Binomial name
- Euphaedra luteolucens Hecq, 1995

Synonyms
- Euphaedra (Euphaedrana) luteolucens

Species of butterfly

Euphaedra luteolucens, the Gashaka-Gumpti Ceres forester, is a butterfly in the family Nymphalidae. It is found in Nigeria. The habitat consists of forests.
