= Euphaedra centralis =

Scientific classification
- Kingdom: Animalia
- Phylum: Arthropoda
- Class: Insecta
- Order: Lepidoptera
- Family: Nymphalidae
- Genus: Euphaedra
- Species: E. centralis

Binomial name
- Euphaedra centralis Hecq, 1985

Synonyms
- Euphaedra campaspe centralis Hecq, 1985; Euphaedra (Euphaedrana) centralis

Species of butterfly

Euphaedra centralis is a butterfly in the family Nymphalidae. It is found in the Democratic Republic of the Congo, where it is only known from the central basin.
