= Euphaedra ignota =

Scientific classification
- Kingdom: Animalia
- Phylum: Arthropoda
- Clade: Pancrustacea
- Class: Insecta
- Order: Lepidoptera
- Family: Nymphalidae
- Genus: Euphaedra
- Species: E. ignota

Binomial name
- Euphaedra ignota Hecq, 1996

Synonyms
- Euphaedra (Euphaedrana) ignota

Species of butterfly

Euphaedra ignota, the Ghana Ceres forester, is a butterfly in the family Nymphalidae. It is found in Ghana. The habitat consists of dense forests.

Torben Larsen developed a species numbering system for his 2005 publication Butterflies of West Africa. This species is #1096. The 'Larsen' numbers have since been used with permission in A Sharp Eye on Butterflies of Ghana.
