= Euphaedra bergeri =

Scientific classification
- Kingdom: Animalia
- Phylum: Arthropoda
- Class: Insecta
- Order: Lepidoptera
- Family: Nymphalidae
- Genus: Euphaedra
- Species: E. bergeri

Binomial name
- Euphaedra bergeri Hecq, 1974

Synonyms
- Euphaedra (Euphaedrana) bergeri

Species of butterfly

Euphaedra bergeri is a butterfly in the family Nymphalidae. It is found in the Democratic Republic of the Congo (Shaba).
