= Euphaedra mariaechristinae =

Scientific classification
- Kingdom: Animalia
- Phylum: Arthropoda
- Clade: Pancrustacea
- Class: Insecta
- Order: Lepidoptera
- Family: Nymphalidae
- Genus: Euphaedra
- Species: E. mariaechristinae

Binomial name
- Euphaedra mariaechristinae Hecq & Joly, 2003

Synonyms
- Euphaedra (Gausapia) mariaechristinae

Species of butterfly

Euphaedra mariaechristinae, or Marie-Christine's striped forester, is a butterfly in the family Nymphalidae. It is found in eastern Ivory Coast and Ghana. The habitat consists of dense tropical rain forests.

Torben Larsen developed a species numbering system for his 2005 publication Butterflies of West Africa. This species is #1047A-C. The 'Larsen' numbers have since been used with permission in A Sharp Eye on Butterflies of Ghana.

== Similar species ==
Other members of the Euphaedra zaddachii species group q.v.
