= Euphaedra exerrata =

Scientific classification
- Kingdom: Animalia
- Phylum: Arthropoda
- Class: Insecta
- Order: Lepidoptera
- Family: Nymphalidae
- Genus: Euphaedra
- Species: E. exerrata

Binomial name
- Euphaedra exerrata Hecq, 1982

Synonyms
- Euphaedra (Euphaedrana) exerrata

Species of butterfly

Euphaedra exerrata, the lesser-banded Themis forester, is a butterfly in the family Nymphalidae. It is found in Nigeria and Cameroon. The habitat consists of forests.

Adults are attracted to fallen fruit.
