= Euphaedra variabilis =

Scientific classification
- Kingdom: Animalia
- Phylum: Arthropoda
- Class: Insecta
- Order: Lepidoptera
- Family: Nymphalidae
- Genus: Euphaedra
- Species: E. variabilis

Binomial name
- Euphaedra variabilis Guillaumin, 1976

Synonyms
- Euphaedra zampa variabilis Guillaumin, 1976; Euphaedra (Euphaedrana) variabilis

Species of butterfly

Euphaedra variabilis is a butterfly in the family Nymphalidae. It is found in Gabon and the central part of the Democratic Republic of the Congo.
