= Euphaedra margueriteae =

Scientific classification
- Kingdom: Animalia
- Phylum: Arthropoda
- Class: Insecta
- Order: Lepidoptera
- Family: Nymphalidae
- Genus: Euphaedra
- Species: E. margueriteae

Binomial name
- Euphaedra margueriteae Hecq, 1978

Synonyms
- Euphaedra (Euphaedrana) margueriteae

Species of butterfly

Euphaedra margueriteae is a butterfly in the family Nymphalidae. It is found in the Democratic Republic of the Congo (Kivu), Rwanda and Uganda.
