= Euphaedra modesta =

Scientific classification
- Kingdom: Animalia
- Phylum: Arthropoda
- Clade: Pancrustacea
- Class: Insecta
- Order: Lepidoptera
- Family: Nymphalidae
- Genus: Euphaedra
- Species: E. modesta

Binomial name
- Euphaedra modesta Hecq, 1982

Synonyms
- Euphaedra (Euphaedrana) modesta

Species of butterfly

Euphaedra modesta, the modest Themis forester, is a butterfly in the family Nymphalidae. It is found in north-western Guinea, Ivory Coast and Ghana. The habitat consists of forests.

Adults are attracted to fallen fruit.

The larvae feed on Deinbollia pinnata and Blighia sapida.
