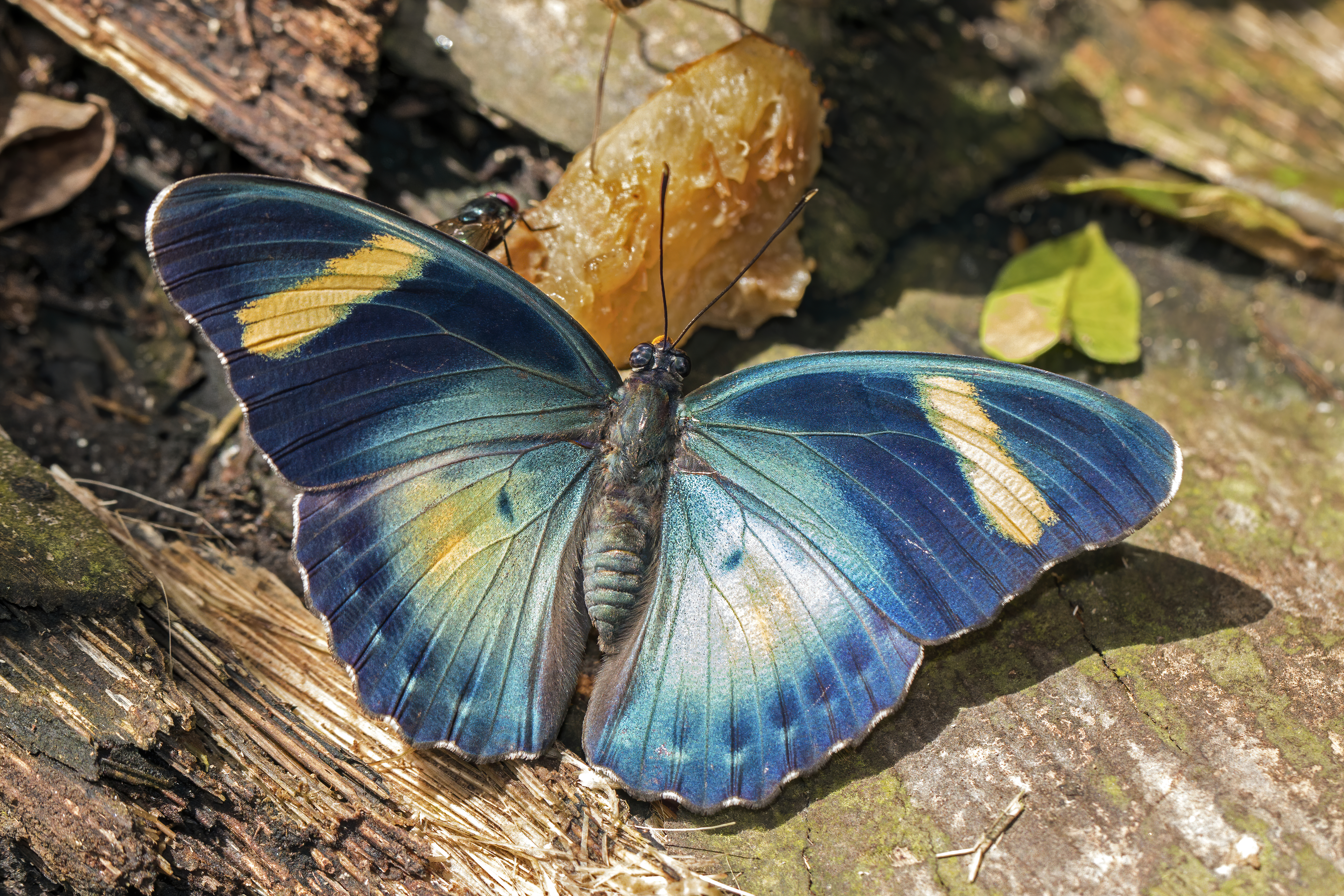

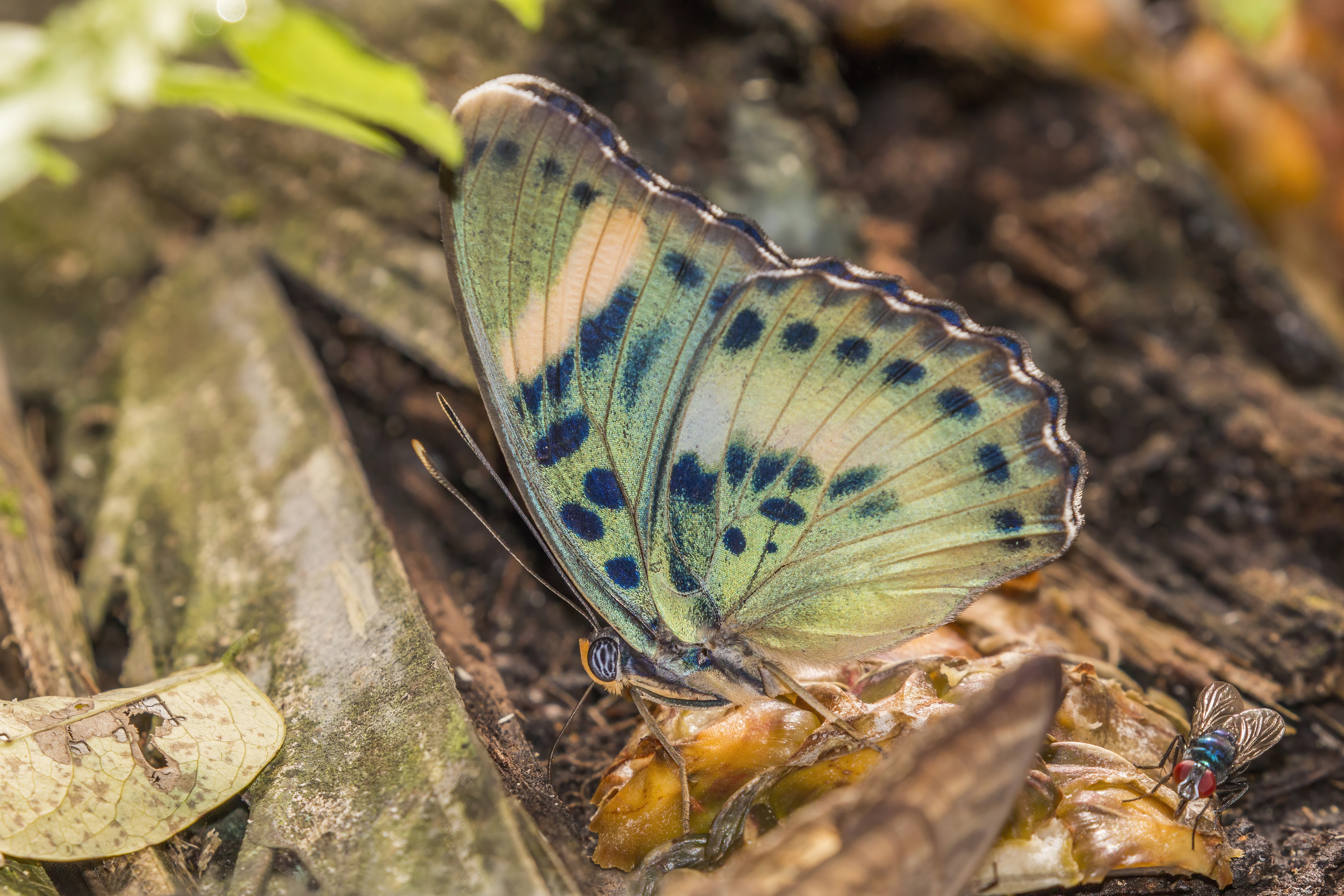
- Both E. phaethusa phaethusa male, Ghana

Scientific classification
- Kingdom: Animalia
- Phylum: Arthropoda
- Clade: Pancrustacea
- Class: Insecta
- Order: Lepidoptera
- Family: Nymphalidae
- Subfamily: Limenitidinae
- Tribe: Adoliadini
- Genus: Euphaedra; Hübner, [1819]

Synonyms
- Najas Hübner, [1807]; Romaleosoma Blanchard, 1840; Proteuphaedra Hecq, 1976; Xypetana Hecq, 1976; Euphaedrana Hecq, 1976; Gausapia Hecq, 1976; Medoniana Hecq, 1976; Neophronia Hecq, 1985

= Euphaedra =

Genus of brush-footed butterflies

Euphaedra is a genus of butterfles in the subfamily Limenitidinae. The species of the genus are found in the Afrotropical realm mainly in the Guinean Forests of West Africa and the Congolian forests.

== Description ==
Euphaedra are large and showy butterflies. They share a common wing shape. On the basal areas of the upperside of the wings (especially the hindwings) are large suffused patches of metallic green, blue, orange or red. Most species also have a cream or orange subapical bar. The undersides are various shades of yellow or green and marked with black streaks and spots. Many species also have pink patches or streaks on the undersides of the hindwings.

The larvae are green, with yellow and pink markings and bear long and branched lateral spines.

== Biology ==
Green species or forms are found in rain forest, yellow species or forms typically occur in drier and often more patchy forests. This is a camouflage adaptation to particular forest light patterns.

The larvae of most species feed on Sapindaceae others on Anacardiaceae, Rutaceae, Sterculiaceae, Annonaceae, Palmae.

== Taxonomy ==
Euphaedra is a species rich genus. In the most recent monograph Jacques Hecq listed 180 species later adding 12. In many species the intraspecific variation is as great or greater than the interspecific variation and the number of species may be smaller.

Aurivillius had this to say "Several species or forms are noted for their extraordinary variability, whilst others hardly vary at all.As usual a whole series of species were formerly erected on the variable forms, but as these so-called species are connected by numerous transitional forms it is almost certain that we are here dealing with only some few species".

The species level taxonomy of these polymorphic and also hybridising butterflies is a challenge requiring a synthesis of studies of their evolutionary taxonomy, sympatry and molecular phylogenetics in combination with detailed morphological studies. This is so far only partly achieved.

The type species of the genus is Papilio cyparissa Cramer.

== Species groups ==
Defining species groups is a convenient way of subdividing well-defined genera with a large number of recognized species. Euphaedra species are so arranged in assemblages called "species groups" (not superspecies, but an informal phenetic arrangement). These may or may not be clades. As molecular phylogenetic studies continue, lineages distinct enough to warrant some formal degree of recognition become evident and new groupings are suggested, but consistent ranking remains a problem.

== Species ==
Listed alphabetically within species groups:

- Subgenus Proteuphaedra Hecq, 1976
  - Euphaedra adolfifrederici Schultze, 1920
  - Euphaedra aubergeri Hecq, 1977
  - Euphaedra aurivillii Niepelt, 1914
  - Euphaedra fucora Hecq, 1979
  - Euphaedra imperialis Lindemans, 1910
  - Euphaedra luperca Hewitson, 1864
  - Euphaedra lupercoides Rothschild, 1918
  - Euphaedra luteofasciata Hecq, 1979
  - Euphaedra marginalis Hecq, 1979
  - Euphaedra rubrocostata (Aurivillius, 1898)
  - Euphaedra symphona Bethune-Baker, 1908
- Subgenus Medoniana Hecq, 1976
  - Euphaedra medon (Linnaeus, 1763)
- Subgenus Gausapia Hecq, 1976
  - The gausapia species group
    - Euphaedra calliope Hecq, 1981
    - Euphaedra clio Hecq, 1981
    - Euphaedra ducarmei Hecq, 1977
    - Euphaedra extensa Hecq, 1981
    - Euphaedra gausape (Butler, [1866])
    - Euphaedra hastiri Hecq, 1981
    - Euphaedra judith Weymer, 1892
    - Euphaedra landbecki Rothschild, 1918
    - Euphaedra melpomene Hecq, 1981
    - Euphaedra ombrophila Hecq, 1981
    - Euphaedra plantroui Hecq, 1981
  - The zaddachi species group
    - Euphaedra athena Hecq & Joly, 2003
    - Euphaedra barnsi Hecq, 1983
    - Euphaedra christyi Sharpe, 1904
    - Euphaedra erici Hecq & Joly, 1987
    - Euphaedra mariaechristinae Hecq & Joly, 2003
    - Euphaedra mbamou Hecq, 1987
    - Euphaedra morini Hecq, 1983
    - Euphaedra pallas Hecq, 2004
    - Euphaedra thalie Hecq, 1981
    - Euphaedra zaddachi Dewitz, 1879
- Subgenus Xypetana Hecq, 1976
  - The xypete species group
    - Euphaedra acuta Hecq, 1977
    - Euphaedra hebes Hecq, 1980
    - Euphaedra hewitsoni Hecq, 1974
    - Euphaedra larseni Hecq, 2005
    - Euphaedra maxima Holland, 1920
    - Euphaedra oremansi Hecq, 1996
    - Euphaedra xypete (Hewitson, 1865)
  - The dargei species group
    - Euphaedra acutoides Hecq, 1996
    - Euphaedra brevis Hecq, 1977
    - Euphaedra dargei Hecq, 1975
    - Euphaedra grandis Hecq, 1980
    - Euphaedra graueri Rothschild, 1918
    - Euphaedra herberti (Sharpe, 1891)
    - Euphaedra karschi Bartel, 1905
    - Euphaedra lata Hecq, 1980
    - Euphaedra ubangui Hecq, 1974
  - The sinuosa species group
    - Euphaedra diffusa Gaede, 1916
    - Euphaedra hollandi Hecq, 1974
    - Euphaedra sinuosa Hecq, 1974
  - The mirabilis species group
    - Euphaedra ansorgei Rothschild, 1918
    - Euphaedra caerulescens Grose-Smith, 1890
    - Euphaedra camiadei Hecq, 2004
    - Euphaedra crockeri (Butler, 1869)
    - Euphaedra crossei Sharpe, 1902
    - Euphaedra cuprea Hecq, 1980
    - Euphaedra irangi Hecq, 2004
    - Euphaedra jacqueshecqui Bollino, 1998
    - Euphaedra mirabilis Hecq, 1980
    - Euphaedra mondahensis van de Weghe, Oremans & Hecq, 2005
    - Euphaedra pervaga Hecq, 1996
    - Euphaedra romboutsi Hecq, 2004
- Subgenus Radia Hecq, 1976
  - Euphaedra eusemoides (Grose-Smith & Kirby, 1889)
  - Euphaedra imitans Holland, 1893
- Subgenus Euphaedra
  - Euphaedra cyparissa (Cramer, [1775])
  - Euphaedra sarcoptera (Butler, 1871)
- Subgenus Euphaedrana Hecq, 1976
  - The themis species group
    - Euphaedra aberrans Staudinger, 1891
    - Euphaedra adonina (Hewitson, 1865)
    - Euphaedra apparata Hecq, 1982
    - Euphaedra appositiva Hecq, 1982
    - Euphaedra aureola Kirby, 1889
    - Euphaedra campaspe (C. & R. Felder, [1867])
    - Euphaedra canui Hecq, 1987
    - Euphaedra centralis Hecq, 1985
    - Euphaedra congo Hecq, 1985
    - Euphaedra controversa Hecq, 1997
    - Euphaedra eberti Aurivillius, 1896
    - Euphaedra exerrata Hecq, 1982
    - Euphaedra janetta (Butler, 1871)
    - Euphaedra justicia Staudinger, 1886
    - Euphaedra laboureana Toulgoët, 1957
    - Euphaedra laguerrei Hecq, 1979
    - Euphaedra limbourgi Oremans, 2006
    - Euphaedra minuta Hecq, 1982
    - Euphaedra modesta Hecq, 1982
    - Euphaedra permixtum (Butler, 1873)
    - Euphaedra piriformis Hecq, 1982
    - Euphaedra splendens Hecq, 1982
    - Euphaedra stellata Hecq, 1991
    - Euphaedra temeraria Hecq, 2007
    - Euphaedra themis (Hübner, [1807])
    - Euphaedra ueleana Hecq, 1982
    - Euphaedra uniformis (Neustetter, 1952)
    - Euphaedra vetusta (Butler, 1871)
    - Euphaedra viridirupta Hecq, 2007
  - The ceres species group
    - Euphaedra afzelii (C. & R. Felder, [1867])
    - Euphaedra ceres (Fabricius, 1775)
    - Euphaedra compacta Hecq, 1997
    - Euphaedra cottoni Sharpe, 1907
    - Euphaedra dargeana Hecq, 1980
    - Euphaedra delera Hecq, 1983
    - Euphaedra demeter Hecq, 1983
    - Euphaedra densamacula Hecq, 1997
    - Euphaedra fontainei Hecq, 1977
    - Euphaedra francina Godart, [1824]
    - Euphaedra grilloti Hecq, 1983
    - Euphaedra ignota Hecq, 1996
    - Euphaedra inanum (Butler, 1873)
    - Euphaedra intermedia Rebel, 1914
    - Euphaedra jacksoni Hecq, 1980
    - Euphaedra jolyana Hecq, 1986
    - Euphaedra knoopiana Hecq, 1995
    - Euphaedra luteolucens Hecq, 1995
    - Euphaedra margaritifera Schultze, 1920
    - Euphaedra nigrocilia Lathy, 1903
    - Euphaedra persephona Hecq, 1983
    - Euphaedra phaethusa (Butler, [1866])
    - Euphaedra phosphor Joicey & Talbot, 1921
    - Euphaedra preussiana Gaede, 1916
    - Euphaedra proserpina Hecq, 1983
    - Euphaedra ravola (Hewitson, 1866)
    - Euphaedra regis-leopoldi Hecq, 1996
    - Euphaedra regularis Hecq, 1983
    - Euphaedra rezia (Hewitson, 1866)
    - Euphaedra sarita (Sharpe, 1891)
    - Euphaedra solida Hecq, 1997
    - Euphaedra subprotea Hecq, 1986
    - Euphaedra tenebrosa Hecq, 1983
    - Euphaedra uganda Aurivillius, 1895
    - Euphaedra velutina Hecq, 1997
    - Euphaedra villiersi Condamin, 1964
    - Euphaedra viridicaerulea Bartel, 1905
    - Euphaedra wojtusiaki Hecq, 1993
  - The preussi species group
    - Euphaedra albofasciata Berger, 1981
    - Euphaedra bergeri Hecq, 1974
    - Euphaedra cinnamomea Rothschild, 1918
    - Euphaedra disjuncta Hecq, 1984
    - Euphaedra fascinata Hecq, 1984
    - Euphaedra fulvofasciata Holland, 1920
    - Euphaedra illustris Talbot, 1927
    - Euphaedra leloupi Overlaet, 1955
    - Euphaedra margueriteae Hecq, 1978
    - Euphaedra mayumbensis Hecq, 1984
    - Euphaedra miranda Hecq, 1984
    - Euphaedra neumanni Rothschild, 1902
    - Euphaedra niveovittata Overlaet, 1955
    - Euphaedra ochrovirens Hecq, 1984
    - Euphaedra olivacea Grünberg, 1908
    - Euphaedra overlaeti Hulstaert, 1926
    - Euphaedra paradoxa Neave, 1904
    - Euphaedra preussi Staudinger, 1891
    - Euphaedra procera Hecq, 1984
    - Euphaedra subprocera Hecq, 1984
    - Euphaedra subviridis Holland, 1920
    - Euphaedra vicina Hecq, 1984
    - Euphaedra xerophila Hecq, 1974
  - The eleus species group
    - Euphaedra alacris Hecq, 1978
    - Euphaedra amieti Hecq, 1994
    - Euphaedra asteria Hecq, 1993
    - Euphaedra bouyeri Hecq, 1993
    - Euphaedra castanoides Hecq, 1985
    - Euphaedra cooksoni Druce, 1905
    - Euphaedra confina Hecq, 1992
    - Euphaedra coprates (Druce, 1875)
    - Euphaedra edwardsii (van der Hoeven, 1845)
    - Euphaedra eleus (Drury, 1782)
    - Euphaedra ferruginea Staudinger, 1886
    - Euphaedra hybrida Hecq, 1978
    - Euphaedra katangensis Talbot, 1927
    - Euphaedra molensis sp.nov., 2025
    - Euphaedra murphyi Hecq, 1991
    - Euphaedra nigrobasalis Joicey & Talbot, 1921
    - Euphaedra ochracea Hecq, 1978
    - Euphaedra orientalis Rothschild, 1898
    - Euphaedra perseis (Drury, 1773)
    - Euphaedra rattrayi Sharpe, 1904
    - Euphaedra ruspina Hewitson, 1865
    - Euphaedra sangbae Hecq, 1996
    - Euphaedra semipreussiana Hecq, 1993
    - Euphaedra simplex Hecq, 1978
    - Euphaedra subferruginea Guillaumin, 1976
    - Euphaedra variabilis Guillaumin, 1976
    - Euphaedra zampa (Westwood, 1850)
  - The harpalyce species group
    - Euphaedra alava Hecq, 2000
    - Euphaedra alboides Hecq, 1984
    - Euphaedra alternus van Someren, 1935
    - Euphaedra dubreka Collins & Larsen, 2005
    - Euphaedra eupalus (Fabricius, 1781)
    - Euphaedra harpalyce (Cramer, [1777])
    - Euphaedra losinga (Hewitson, 1864)
    - Euphaedra luafa Oremans, 1998
    - Euphaedra occulta Hecq, 1982
    - Euphaedra thierrybaulini Oremans, 1999
    - Euphaedra vandeweghei Hecq, 2004
  - Species group unknown
    - Euphaedra normalis Staudinger, 1891
- Subgenus Neophronia Hecq, 1985
  - Euphaedra neophron (Hopffer, 1855)
- Subgenus unknown
  - Euphaedra abri Faravel, 2005
  - Euphaedra castanea Berger, 1981
  - Euphaedra cuypersiana Hecq, 2006
  - Euphaedra mambili Hecq, 2001
  - Euphaedra opulenta Hecq & Van de Weghe, 2005
  - Euphaedra rex Stoneham, 1935
  - Euphaedra sabinae Faravel, 2002
  - Euphaedra sardetta Berger, 1981
  - Euphaedra vulnerata Schultze, 1916
  - Euphaedra wissmanni Niepelt, 1906

The upper and underside of both male and female E. molenis (sp. nov.) are illustrated in A Sharp Eye on Butterflies of Ghana.
