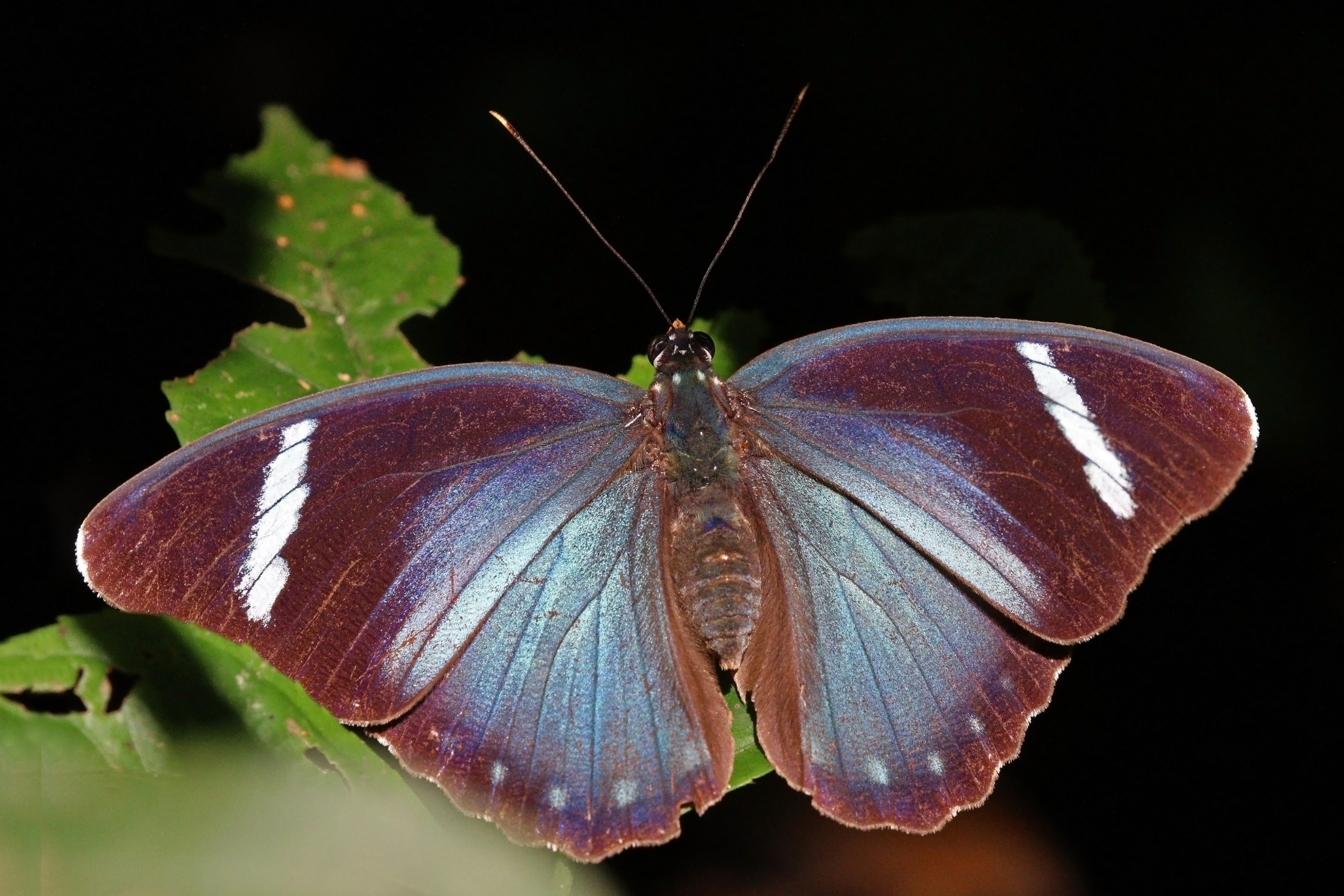
- Male, Kibale National Park, Uganda

Scientific classification
- Kingdom: Animalia
- Phylum: Arthropoda
- Class: Insecta
- Order: Lepidoptera
- Family: Nymphalidae
- Genus: Euphaedra
- Species: E. rex

Binomial name
- Euphaedra rex Stoneham, 1935

Synonyms
- Euphaedra ugandae kakamegae van Someren, 1935; Euphaedra kakamegae; Euphaedra rex f. bunyalae Stoneham, 1965

= Euphaedra rex =

Species of butterfly

Euphaedra rex is a butterfly in the family Nymphalidae. It is found in Uganda and Kenya.
