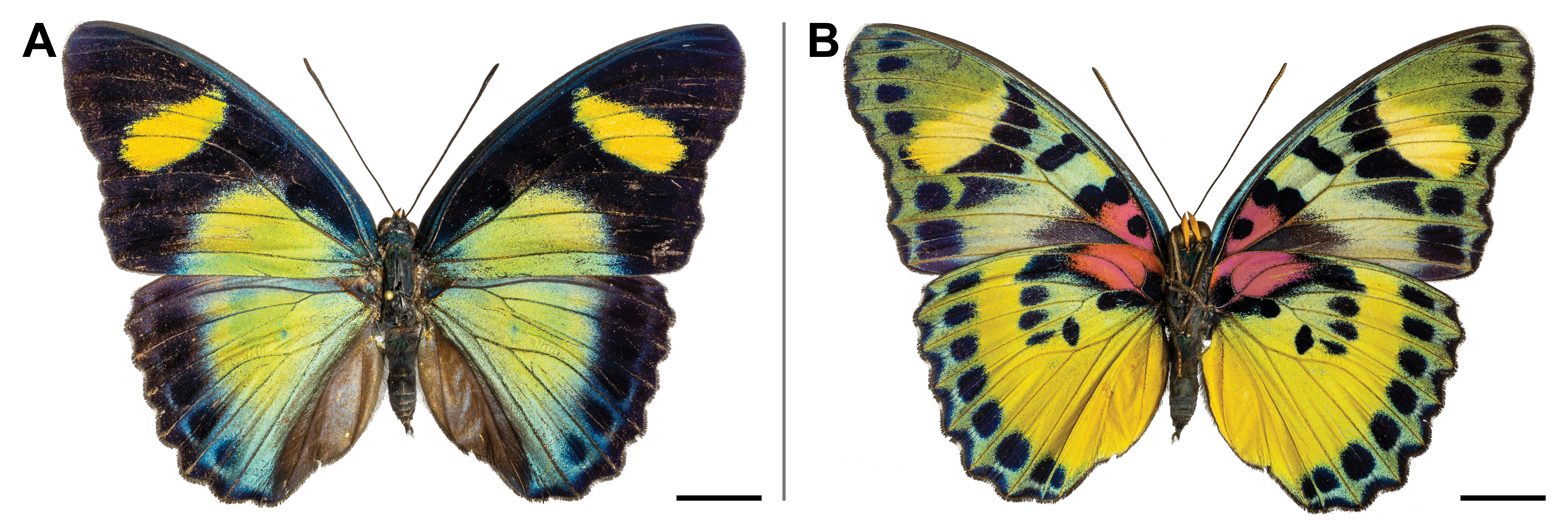

Scientific classification
- Kingdom: Animalia
- Phylum: Arthropoda
- Class: Insecta
- Order: Lepidoptera
- Family: Nymphalidae
- Genus: Euphaedra
- Species: E. temeraria

Binomial name
- Euphaedra temeraria Hecq, 2007

Synonyms
- Euphaedra (Euphaedrana) temeraria

= Euphaedra temeraria =

Species of butterfly

Euphaedra temeraria is a butterfly in the family Nymphalidae. It is found in Equatorial Guinea and Gabon.
