= Euphaedra romboutsi =

Scientific classification
- Kingdom: Animalia
- Phylum: Arthropoda
- Class: Insecta
- Order: Lepidoptera
- Family: Nymphalidae
- Genus: Euphaedra
- Species: E. romboutsi

Binomial name
- Euphaedra romboutsi Hecq, 2004

Synonyms
- Euphaedra (Xypetana) romboutsi

Species of butterfly

Euphaedra romboutsi is a butterfly in the family Nymphalidae. It is found in the Democratic Republic of the Congo.
