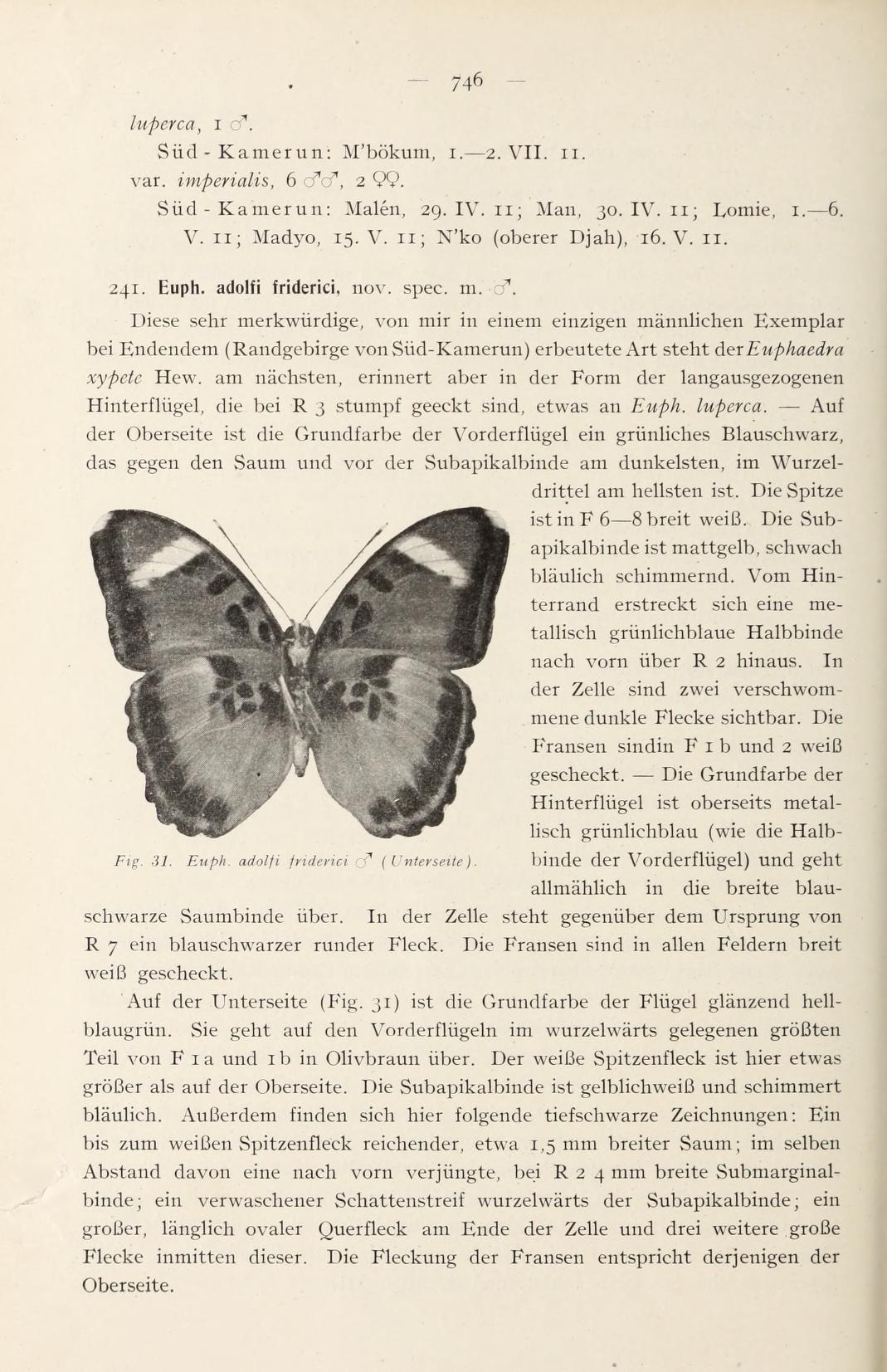

Scientific classification
- Kingdom: Animalia
- Phylum: Arthropoda
- Class: Insecta
- Order: Lepidoptera
- Family: Nymphalidae
- Genus: Euphaedra
- Species: E. adolfifrederici

Binomial name
- Euphaedra adolfifrederici Schultze, 1920

Synonyms
- Euphaedra (Proteuphaedra) adolfifriderici

= Euphaedra adolfifrederici =

Species of butterfly

Euphaedra adolfifrederici is a butterfly in the family Nymphalidae. It is found from Cameroon to the south-western part of the Democratic Republic of the Congo.
