= Euphaedra extensa =

Scientific classification
- Kingdom: Animalia
- Phylum: Arthropoda
- Class: Insecta
- Order: Lepidoptera
- Family: Nymphalidae
- Genus: Euphaedra
- Species: E. extensa

Binomial name
- Euphaedra extensa Hecq, 1981

Synonyms
- Euphaedra (Gausapia) extensa; Euphaedra gausape ab. extensa Bartel, 1905

Species of butterfly

Euphaedra extensa, the pale striped forester, is a butterfly in the family Nymphalidae. It is found in eastern Nigeria, Cameroon and Bioko. Its habitat consists of forests.
