= Euphaedra jolyana =

Scientific classification
- Kingdom: Animalia
- Phylum: Arthropoda
- Class: Insecta
- Order: Lepidoptera
- Family: Nymphalidae
- Genus: Euphaedra
- Species: E. jolyana

Binomial name
- Euphaedra jolyana Hecq, 1986

Synonyms
- Euphaedra (Euphaedrana) jolyana

Species of butterfly

Euphaedra jolyana is a butterfly in the family Nymphalidae. It is found in the north-western part of the Democratic Republic of the Congo.
