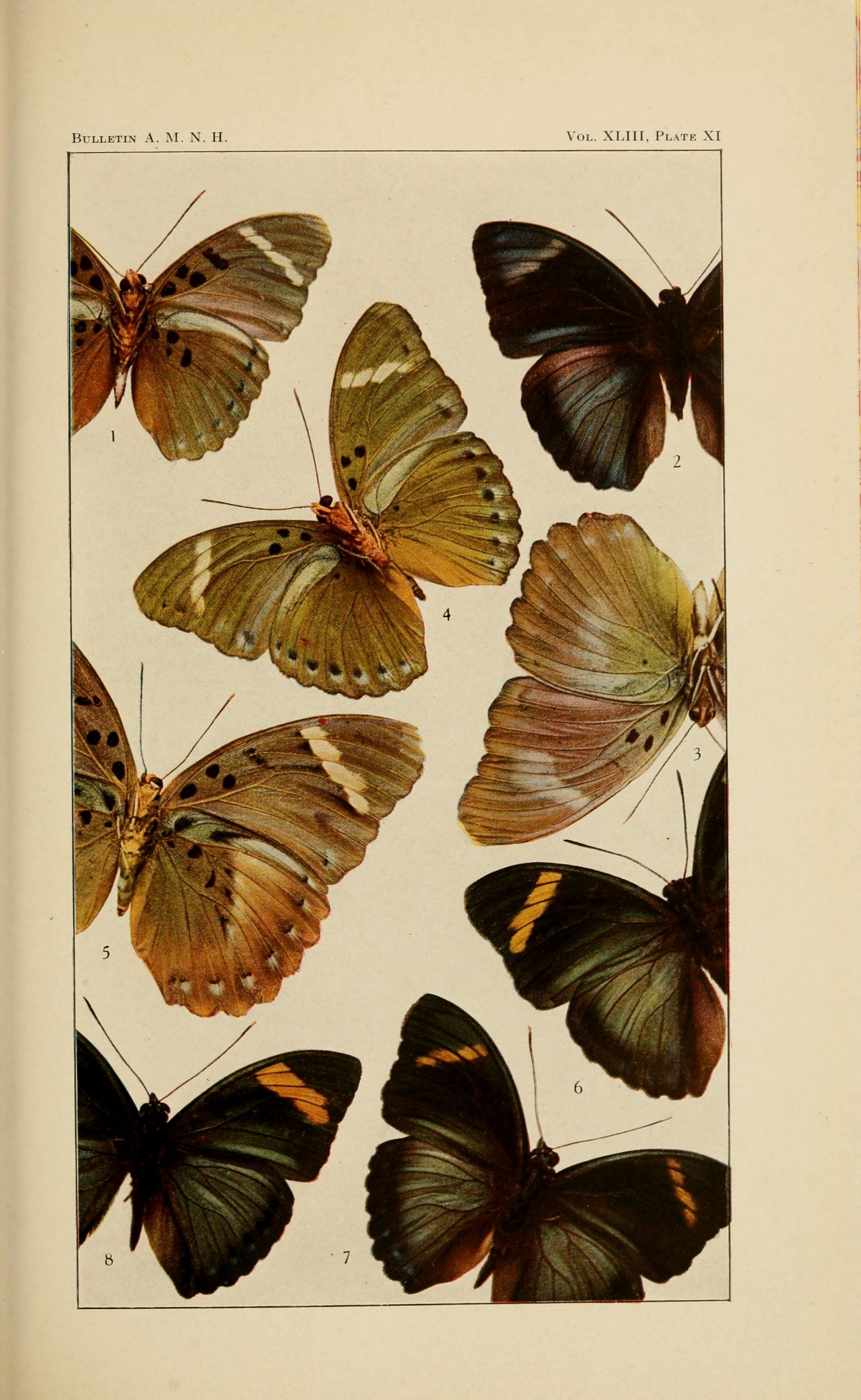
- Figure 4, holotype

Scientific classification
- Kingdom: Animalia
- Phylum: Arthropoda
- Class: Insecta
- Order: Lepidoptera
- Family: Nymphalidae
- Genus: Euphaedra
- Species: E. subviridis

Binomial name
- Euphaedra subviridis Holland, 1920

Synonyms
- Euphaedra (Euphaedrana) subviridis

= Euphaedra subviridis =

Species of butterfly

Euphaedra subviridis is a butterfly in the family Nymphalidae. It is found in the Democratic Republic of the Congo.

Closely resembling preussi, but with the upper outer two-thirds of the forewings in the case of the male velvety black, the postapical transverse band diffuse, greenish, and toward the apex fading into a lustrous green subapical area which, in certain lights, shows as a brilliant green tract covering the apical area from near the apex to the outer end of the cell; the hind wings and the posterior margin of the fore wing for some distance iridescent greenish blue, this area on the fore wings reaching the lower margin of the cell near the base, but not reaching the outer angle. The posterior wings broadly bordered with dark green, accentuated with a submarginal series of black velvety spots. On the under side in the male the wings are more or less grass-green, tinged with chocolate-brown, the transverse subapical band of the primaries being whitish. The spots in the cells of the primaries and the secondaries are variable in number and size, as is true of all the varieties, and this is also true of the submarginal series of dark spots.

The female is marked on the upper side like the male except that the transverse subapical band is pure snow-white. The outer margins, as in all the forms of preussi, have the fringes dark, interrupted on the interspaces with white, and the fore wings are at the apex tipped with white. There are two males and one female from Medje which I refer to this form. The male and female types are in The American Museum of Natural History; the second male, a paratype, is in the Holland Collection in the Carnegie Museum. This form, which is near typical, preussi, may be at once distinguished from it by the velvety black band which crosses the fore wings from the base to the outer margin, leaving the diffuse paler subapical transverse band and the elongated brilliantly green apical area in striking contrast with the rest of the wing, and by the brilliantly deep green color of the under side of the wing.
