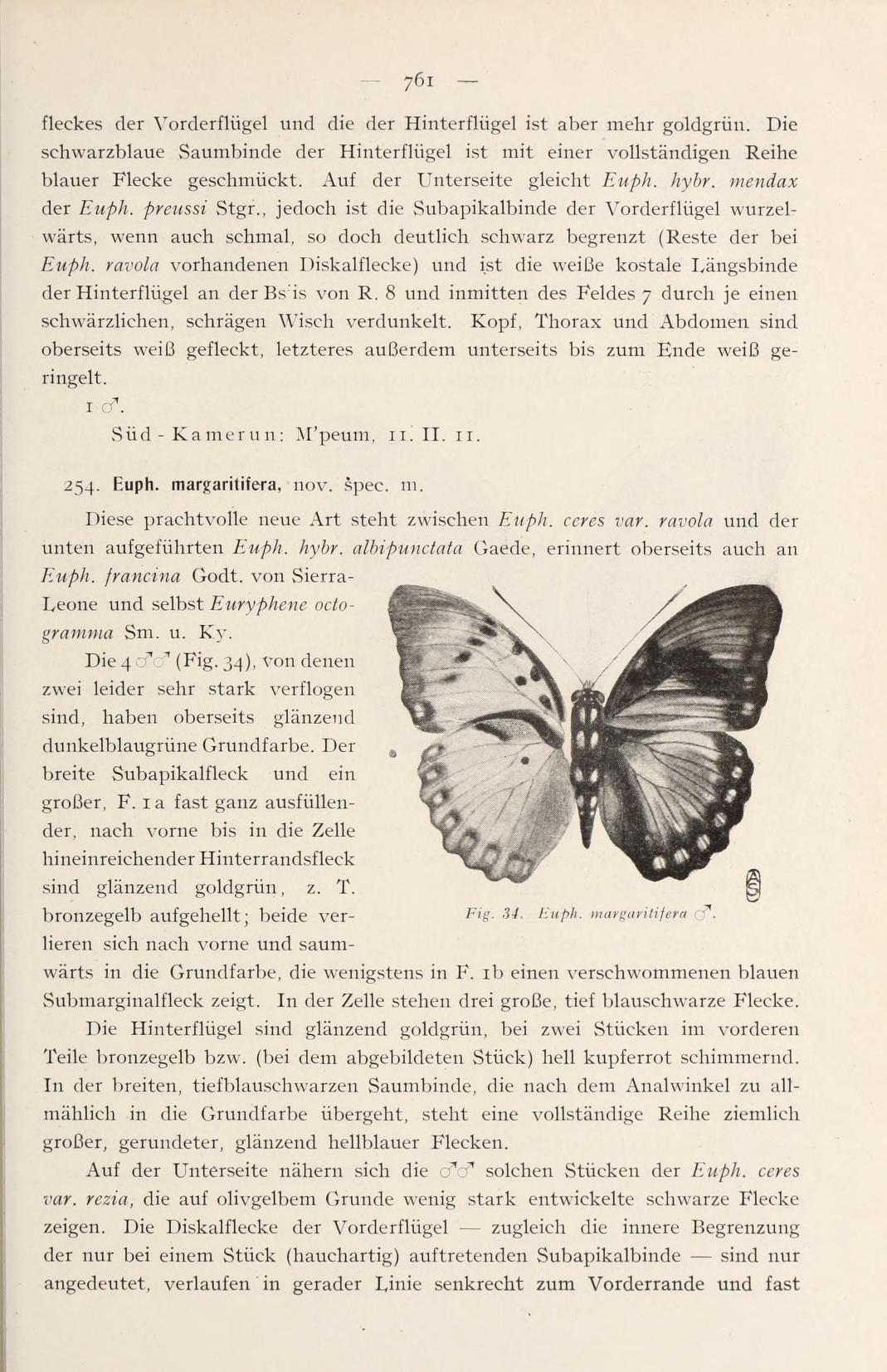
- Original description (pars)

Scientific classification
- Kingdom: Animalia
- Phylum: Arthropoda
- Clade: Pancrustacea
- Class: Insecta
- Order: Lepidoptera
- Family: Nymphalidae
- Genus: Euphaedra
- Species: E. margaritifera

Binomial name
- Euphaedra margaritifera Schultze, 1920

Synonyms
- Euphaedra (Euphaedrana) margaritifera; Euphaedra ceres var. zenkeri Neustetter, 1927

= Euphaedra margaritifera =

Species of butterfly

Euphaedra margaritifera, the pearl-edged Ceres forester, is a butterfly in the family Nymphalidae. It is found in Nigeria and Cameroon. The habitat consists of forests. It is known from very few localities and nothing is known of its biology.
