= Euphaedra leloupi =

Scientific classification
- Kingdom: Animalia
- Phylum: Arthropoda
- Class: Insecta
- Order: Lepidoptera
- Family: Nymphalidae
- Genus: Euphaedra
- Species: E. leloupi

Binomial name
- Euphaedra leloupi Overlaet, 1955

Synonyms
- Euphaedra (Euphaedrana) leloupi

Species of butterfly

Euphaedra leloupi is a butterfly in the family Nymphalidae. It is found in the Democratic Republic of the Congo (Lomami and Lualaba).
