= Euphaedra paradoxa =

Scientific classification
- Kingdom: Animalia
- Phylum: Arthropoda
- Class: Insecta
- Order: Lepidoptera
- Family: Nymphalidae
- Genus: Euphaedra
- Species: E. paradoxa

Binomial name
- Euphaedra paradoxa Neave, 1904

Synonyms
- Euphaedra (Euphaedrana) paradoxa; Euphaedra difficilis Rothschild, 1918; Euphaedra paradoxa f. preussoides van Someren, 1935; Euphaedra paradoxa f. rufescens van Someren, 1935; Euphaedra paradoxa f. vansomereni van Someren, 1935; Euphaedra paradoxa f. comixta van Someren, 1935; Euphaedra paradoxa f. featheri van Someren, 1935; Euphaedra eleus zukumaensis Stoneham, 1956

Species of butterfly

Euphaedra paradoxa is a butterfly in the family Nymphalidae. It is found in Kenya (from the south-western part of the country to the shores of Lake Victoria), Uganda and north-western Tanzania. The habitat consists of forests.

== Description ==
E. paradoxa Neave. Forewing above glossy greenish black with narrow dirty white subapical band and red-brown hindmarginal spot; hindwing above dull red-brown with narrow black marginal band, with greenish reflection, and light green submarginal spots. Under surface light olive-green; forewing with white subapical band; distal part of the hindwing lighter green with indistinct greenish submarginal spots. Uganda.

== Similar species ==
Other members of the Euphaedra preussi species group q.v.
