= Euphaedra lata =

Scientific classification
- Kingdom: Animalia
- Phylum: Arthropoda
- Class: Insecta
- Order: Lepidoptera
- Family: Nymphalidae
- Genus: Euphaedra
- Species: E. lata

Binomial name
- Euphaedra lata Hecq, 1980

Synonyms
- Euphaedra (Xypetana) lata

Species of butterfly

Euphaedra lata is a butterfly in the family Nymphalidae. It is found in the Republic of the Congo and the Democratic Republic of the Congo.

It is a rare species.
