= Euphaedra knoopiana =

Scientific classification
- Kingdom: Animalia
- Phylum: Arthropoda
- Class: Insecta
- Order: Lepidoptera
- Family: Nymphalidae
- Genus: Euphaedra
- Species: E. knoopiana

Binomial name
- Euphaedra knoopiana Hecq, 1995

Synonyms
- Euphaedra (Euphaedrana) knoopiana

Species of butterfly

Euphaedra knoopiana, or Knoop's Ceres forester, is a butterfly in the family Nymphalidae. It is found in Nigeria. The habitat consists of forests.
