= Euphaedra landbecki =

Scientific classification
- Kingdom: Animalia
- Phylum: Arthropoda
- Class: Insecta
- Order: Lepidoptera
- Family: Nymphalidae
- Genus: Euphaedra
- Species: E. landbecki

Binomial name
- Euphaedra landbecki Rothschild, 1918

Synonyms
- Euphaedra gausape landbecki Rothschild, 1918; Euphaedra (Gausapia) landbecki

Species of butterfly

Euphaedra landbecki is a butterfly in the family Nymphalidae. It is found in Sankuru in the Democratic Republic of the Congo.

== Original description ==
Euphaedra gausape landbecki subsp. nov.

Male. Differs from gausape gausape Butler above in the oblique band of forewing merging more into the ground-colour and being much greener, also green of hindwing is much more saturated with yellow. Female. Differs in the green portions of both wings being suffused with yellow and the oblique band with green.Habitat. Luebo, Kassai River (P. Landbeck), 4 males, 2 females.

== Etymology ==
Paul Landbeck was a German consul in Congo and author of Kongoerinnerungen; zwölf Jahre Arbeit und Abenteuer im Innern Afrikas Publisher Berlin : A. Scherl 1912
