= Euphaedra semipreussiana =

Scientific classification
- Kingdom: Animalia
- Phylum: Arthropoda
- Class: Insecta
- Order: Lepidoptera
- Family: Nymphalidae
- Genus: Euphaedra
- Species: E. semipreussiana

Binomial name
- Euphaedra semipreussiana Hecq, 1993

Synonyms
- Euphaedra eleus f. semipreussiana Wichgraf, 1914; Euphaedra (Euphaedrana) semipreussiana

Species of butterfly

Euphaedra semipreussiana, the Korup orange forester, is a butterfly in the family Nymphalidae. It is found in Nigeria and Cameroon. The habitat consists of forests.
