= Euphaedra procera =

Scientific classification
- Kingdom: Animalia
- Phylum: Arthropoda
- Clade: Pancrustacea
- Class: Insecta
- Order: Lepidoptera
- Family: Nymphalidae
- Genus: Euphaedra
- Species: E. procera

Binomial name
- Euphaedra procera Hecq, 1984

Synonyms
- Euphaedra (Euphaedrana) procera

Species of butterfly

Euphaedra procera is a butterfly in the family Nymphalidae. It is found in the southern part of the Central African Republic, the northern part of the Democratic Republic of the Congo and western Uganda.
