= Euphaedra velutina =

Scientific classification
- Kingdom: Animalia
- Phylum: Arthropoda
- Class: Insecta
- Order: Lepidoptera
- Family: Nymphalidae
- Genus: Euphaedra
- Species: E. velutina

Binomial name
- Euphaedra velutina Hecq, 1997

Synonyms
- Euphaedra (Euphaedrana) velutina; Euphaedra subrezia Hecq, 1983

Species of butterfly

Euphaedra velutina, the velvet Ceres forester, is a butterfly in the family Nymphalidae. It is found in Ghana, Nigeria and western Cameroon. The habitat consists of forests.
