= Euphaedra albofasciata =

Scientific classification
- Kingdom: Animalia
- Phylum: Arthropoda
- Class: Insecta
- Order: Lepidoptera
- Family: Nymphalidae
- Genus: Euphaedra
- Species: E. albofasciata

Binomial name
- Euphaedra albofasciata Berger, 1981

Synonyms
- Euphaedra (Euphaedrana) albofasciata; Euphaedra preussi ab. albofasciata Rebel, 1914

Species of butterfly

Euphaedra albofasciata is a butterfly in the family Nymphalidae. It is found in the Democratic Republic of the Congo, Central African Republic and Uganda: (Semuliki National Park).
