= Euphaedra murphyi =

Scientific classification
- Kingdom: Animalia
- Phylum: Arthropoda
- Class: Insecta
- Order: Lepidoptera
- Family: Nymphalidae
- Genus: Euphaedra
- Species: E. murphyi

Binomial name
- Euphaedra murphyi Hecq, 1991

Synonyms
- Euphaedra (Euphaedrana) murphyi

Species of butterfly

Euphaedra murphyi is a butterfly in the family Nymphalidae. It is found in Malawi.
