= Euphaedra congo =

Scientific classification
- Kingdom: Animalia
- Phylum: Arthropoda
- Class: Insecta
- Order: Lepidoptera
- Family: Nymphalidae
- Genus: Euphaedra
- Species: E. congo

Binomial name
- Euphaedra congo Hecq, 1985

Synonyms
- Euphaedra (Euphaedrana) congo; Euphaedra × saritina Schultze, 1920 (hybrid of E. janetta and E. sarita)

Species of butterfly

Euphaedra congo is a butterfly in the family Nymphalidae. It is found in the Republic of the Congo and the Democratic Republic of the Congo (Kinshasa).
