= Euphaedra asteria =

Scientific classification
- Kingdom: Animalia
- Phylum: Arthropoda
- Class: Insecta
- Order: Lepidoptera
- Family: Nymphalidae
- Genus: Euphaedra
- Species: E. asteria

Binomial name
- Euphaedra asteria Hecq, 1993

Synonyms
- Euphaedra (Euphaedrana) asteria

Species of butterfly

Euphaedra asteria is a butterfly in the family Nymphalidae. It is found in the Republic of the Congo.
