= Euphaedra tenebrosa =

Scientific classification
- Kingdom: Animalia
- Phylum: Arthropoda
- Class: Insecta
- Order: Lepidoptera
- Family: Nymphalidae
- Genus: Euphaedra
- Species: E. tenebrosa

Binomial name
- Euphaedra tenebrosa Hecq, 1983

Synonyms
- Euphaedra nigrocilia tenebrosa Hecq, 1983; Euphaedra (Euphaedrana) tenebrosa

Species of butterfly

Euphaedra tenebrosa, the Côte d'Ivoire Ceres forester, is a butterfly in the family Nymphalidae. It is found in Guinea and Ivory Coast. The habitat consists of forests.
