= Euphaedra densamacula =

Scientific classification
- Kingdom: Animalia
- Phylum: Arthropoda
- Class: Insecta
- Order: Lepidoptera
- Family: Nymphalidae
- Genus: Euphaedra
- Species: E. densamacula

Binomial name
- Euphaedra densamacula Hecq, 1997

Synonyms
- Euphaedra (Euphaedrana) densamacula

Species of butterfly

Euphaedra densamacula, the black-spot Ceres forester, is a butterfly in the family Nymphalidae. It is found in Nigeria and Cameroon. The habitat consists of forests.
