= Euphaedra marginalis =

Scientific classification
- Kingdom: Animalia
- Phylum: Arthropoda
- Class: Insecta
- Order: Lepidoptera
- Family: Nymphalidae
- Genus: Euphaedra
- Species: E. marginalis

Binomial name
- Euphaedra marginalis Hecq, 1979

Synonyms
- Euphaedra luperca marginalis Hecq, 1979; Euphaedra (Proteuphaedra) marginalis

Species of butterfly

Euphaedra marginalis is a butterfly in the family Nymphalidae. It is found in the Democratic Republic of the Congo (Ubangi, Mongala and Uele). Images: Types Royal Museum Central Africa
