= Euphaedra fontainei =

Scientific classification
- Kingdom: Animalia
- Phylum: Arthropoda
- Class: Insecta
- Order: Lepidoptera
- Family: Nymphalidae
- Genus: Euphaedra
- Species: E. fontainei

Binomial name
- Euphaedra fontainei Hecq, 1977

Synonyms
- Euphaedra (Euphaedrana) fontainei; Euphaedra fontainei f. agraphica Hecq, 1977

Species of butterfly

Euphaedra fontainei is a butterfly in the family Nymphalidae. It is found in the western part of the Democratic Republic of the Congo, Angola and possibly Gabon.
