= Euphaedra mondahensis =

Scientific classification
- Kingdom: Animalia
- Phylum: Arthropoda
- Clade: Pancrustacea
- Class: Insecta
- Order: Lepidoptera
- Family: Nymphalidae
- Genus: Euphaedra
- Species: E. mondahensis

Binomial name
- Euphaedra mondahensis van de Weghe, Oremans & Hecq, 2005

Synonyms
- Euphaedra (Xypetana) mondahensis

Species of butterfly

Euphaedra mondahensis is a butterfly in the family Nymphalidae. It is found in Cameroon and Gabon.
