= Euphaedra erici =

Scientific classification
- Kingdom: Animalia
- Phylum: Arthropoda
- Clade: Pancrustacea
- Class: Insecta
- Order: Lepidoptera
- Family: Nymphalidae
- Genus: Euphaedra
- Species: E. erici

Binomial name
- Euphaedra erici Hecq & Joly, 1987

Synonyms
- Euphaedra morini erici Hecq & Joly, 1987; Euphaedra (Gausapia) erici

Species of butterfly

Euphaedra erici is a butterfly in the family Nymphalidae. It is found in the Democratic Republic of the Congo.

== Similar species ==
Other members of the Euphaedra zaddachii species group q.v.
