= Euphaedra wojtusiaki =

Scientific classification
- Kingdom: Animalia
- Phylum: Arthropoda
- Class: Insecta
- Order: Lepidoptera
- Family: Nymphalidae
- Genus: Euphaedra
- Species: E. wojtusiaki

Binomial name
- Euphaedra wojtusiaki Hecq, 1993

Synonyms
- Euphaedra (Euphaedrana) wojtusiaki

Species of butterfly

Euphaedra wojtusiaki, or Wojtusiak's Ceres forester, is a butterfly in the family Nymphalidae. It is found in eastern Nigeria. The habitat consists of forests.
