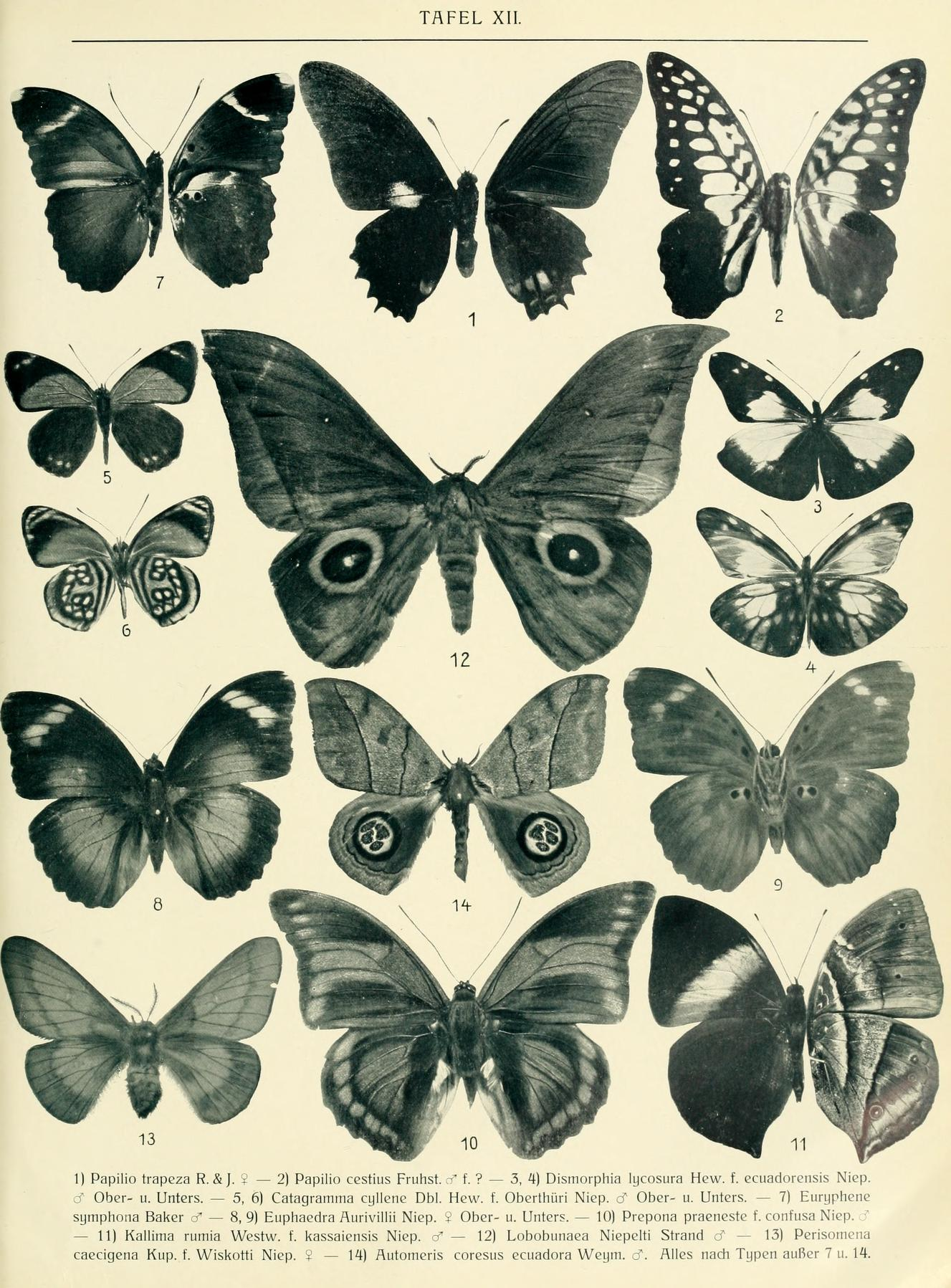
- Plate accompanying original description. Figs.8,9

Scientific classification
- Kingdom: Animalia
- Phylum: Arthropoda
- Class: Insecta
- Order: Lepidoptera
- Family: Nymphalidae
- Genus: Euphaedra
- Species: E. aurivillii

Binomial name
- Euphaedra aurivillii Niepelt, 1914

Synonyms
- Euphaedra (Proteuphaedra) aurivillii

= Euphaedra aurivillii =

Species of butterfly

Euphaedra aurivillii is a butterfly in the family Nymphalidae. It is found in the central and eastern part of the Democratic Republic of the Congo.
