= Euphaedra confina =

Scientific classification
- Kingdom: Animalia
- Phylum: Arthropoda
- Class: Insecta
- Order: Lepidoptera
- Family: Nymphalidae
- Genus: Euphaedra
- Species: E. confina

Binomial name
- Euphaedra confina Hecq, 1992

Synonyms
- Euphaedra (Euphaedrana) confina

Species of butterfly

Euphaedra confina is a butterfly in the family Nymphalidae. It is found in north-western Tanzania. The habitat consists of riparian forests.
