= Euphaedra amieti =

Scientific classification
- Kingdom: Animalia
- Phylum: Arthropoda
- Class: Insecta
- Order: Lepidoptera
- Family: Nymphalidae
- Genus: Euphaedra
- Species: E. amieti

Binomial name
- Euphaedra amieti Hecq, 1993

Synonyms
- Euphaedra (Euphaedrana) amieti

Species of butterfly

Euphaedra amieti is a butterfly in the family Nymphalidae. It is found in Cameroon.
