= Euphaedra alternus =

Scientific classification
- Kingdom: Animalia
- Phylum: Arthropoda
- Class: Insecta
- Order: Lepidoptera
- Family: Nymphalidae
- Genus: Euphaedra
- Species: E. alternus

Binomial name
- Euphaedra alternus van Someren, 1935

Synonyms
- Euphaedra eleus alternus van Someren, 1935; Euphaedra (Euphaedrana) alternus; Euphaedra eleus latifasciata Talbot, 1929; Euphaedra eleus alternus van Someren, 1935

Species of butterfly

Euphaedra alternus is a butterfly in the family Nymphalidae. It is found in the Democratic Republic of the Congo.
