= Euphaedra illustris =

Scientific classification
- Kingdom: Animalia
- Phylum: Arthropoda
- Class: Insecta
- Order: Lepidoptera
- Family: Nymphalidae
- Genus: Euphaedra
- Species: E. illustris

Binomial name
- Euphaedra illustris Talbot, 1927

Synonyms
- Euphaedra preussi illustris Talbot, 1927; Euphaedra (Euphaedrana) illustris

Species of butterfly

Euphaedra illustris is a butterfly in the family Nymphalidae. It is found in the Democratic Republic of the Congo (Shaba). It was described as a subspecies of Euphaedra preussi later raised to a species by Carcasson. It is known only from the type locality “Katanga, Lengi”.There are no details of its biology.
