= Euphaedra miranda =

Scientific classification
- Kingdom: Animalia
- Phylum: Arthropoda
- Class: Insecta
- Order: Lepidoptera
- Family: Nymphalidae
- Genus: Euphaedra
- Species: E. miranda

Binomial name
- Euphaedra miranda Hecq, 1984

Synonyms
- Euphaedra (Euphaedrana) miranda; Euphaedra × opalina Schultze, 1920 (hybrid of E. preussi and E. eleus)

Species of butterfly

Euphaedra miranda is a butterfly in the family Nymphalidae. It is found in the Central African Republic, the western part of the Democratic Republic of the Congo and possibly Cameroon.
