= Euphaedra viridirupta =

Scientific classification
- Kingdom: Animalia
- Phylum: Arthropoda
- Class: Insecta
- Order: Lepidoptera
- Family: Nymphalidae
- Genus: Euphaedra
- Species: E. viridirupta

Binomial name
- Euphaedra viridirupta Hecq, 2007

Synonyms
- Euphaedra (Euphaedrana) viridirupta

Species of butterfly

Euphaedra viridirupta is a butterfly in the family Nymphalidae. It is found in Ivory Coast, Ghana, Nigeria and Cameroon.
