= Euphaedra dubreka =

Scientific classification
- Kingdom: Animalia
- Phylum: Arthropoda
- Class: Insecta
- Order: Lepidoptera
- Family: Nymphalidae
- Genus: Euphaedra
- Species: E. dubreka

Binomial name
- Euphaedra dubreka Collins & Larsen, 2005

Synonyms
- Euphaedra (Euphaedrana) dubreka

Species of butterfly

Euphaedra dubreka, the Guinea Themis forester, is a butterfly in the family Nymphalidae. It is found in south-eastern Guinea and western Sierra Leone. The habitat consists of forests.
