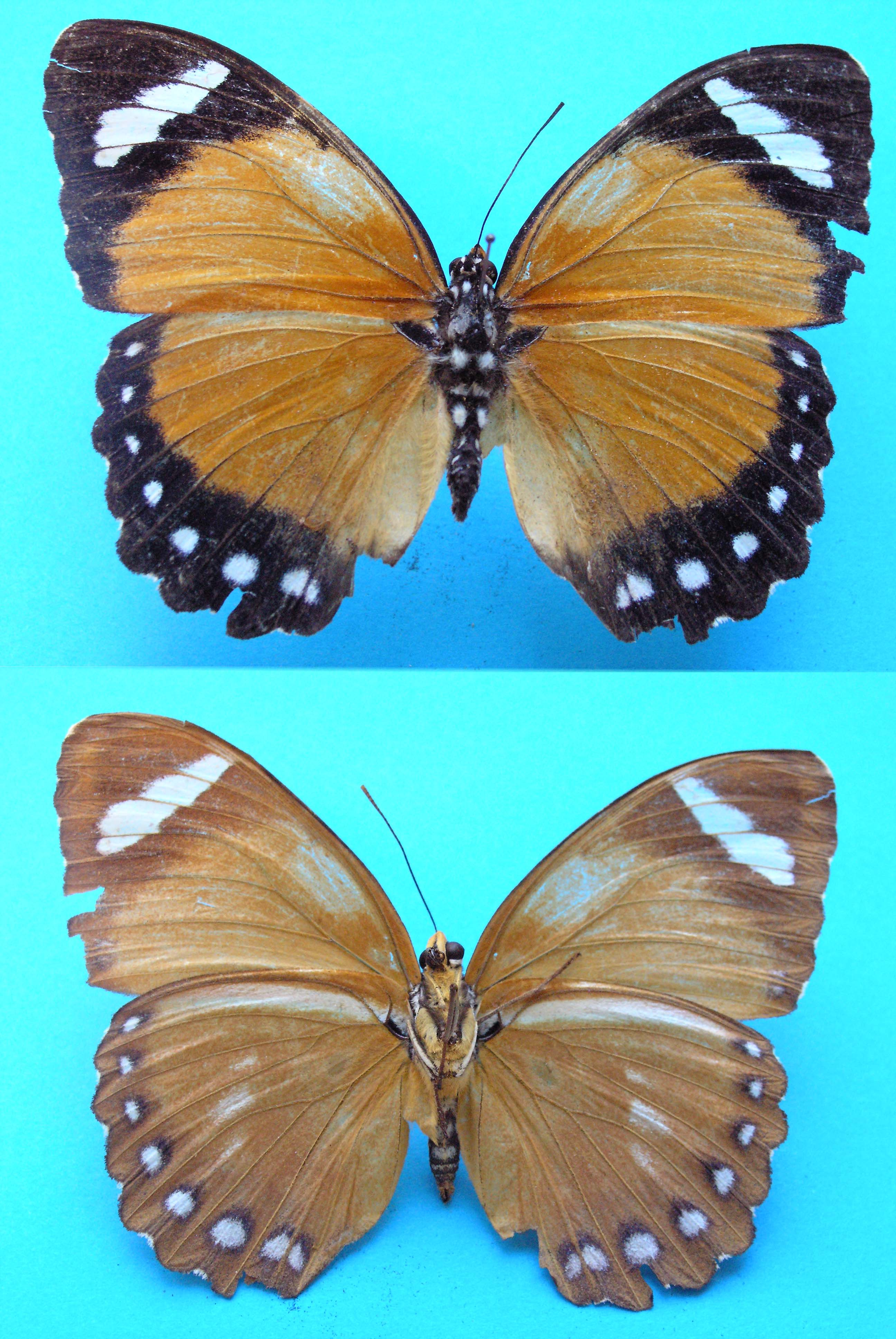

Scientific classification
- Kingdom: Animalia
- Phylum: Arthropoda
- Clade: Pancrustacea
- Class: Insecta
- Order: Lepidoptera
- Family: Nymphalidae
- Genus: Euphaedra
- Species: E. hybrida

Binomial name
- Euphaedra hybrida Hecq, 1978

Synonyms
- Euphaedra (Euphaedrana) hybrida; Euphaedra eleus ab. hybridus Aurivillius, 1899

= Euphaedra hybrida =

Species of butterfly

Euphaedra hybrida is a butterfly in the family Nymphalidae. It is found in Central Africa.

== Similar species ==
Other members of the Euphaedra eleus species group q.v.
