= Euphaedra plantroui =

Scientific classification
- Kingdom: Animalia
- Phylum: Arthropoda
- Class: Insecta
- Order: Lepidoptera
- Family: Nymphalidae
- Genus: Euphaedra
- Species: E. plantroui

Binomial name
- Euphaedra plantroui Hecq, 1981

Synonyms
- Euphaedra (Gausapia) plantroui

Species of butterfly

Euphaedra plantroui, or Plantrou's forester, is a butterfly in the family Nymphalidae. It is found in Ivory Coast. The habitat consists of forests.
