= Euphaedra oremansi =

Scientific classification
- Kingdom: Animalia
- Phylum: Arthropoda
- Class: Insecta
- Order: Lepidoptera
- Family: Nymphalidae
- Genus: Euphaedra
- Species: E. oremansi

Binomial name
- Euphaedra oremansi Hecq, 1996

Synonyms
- Euphaedra (Xypetana) oremansi

Species of butterfly

Euphaedra oremansi is a butterfly in the family Nymphalidae. It is found in the Democratic Republic of the Congo.

It is a rare species.
