= Euphaedra controversa =

Scientific classification
- Kingdom: Animalia
- Phylum: Arthropoda
- Class: Insecta
- Order: Lepidoptera
- Family: Nymphalidae
- Genus: Euphaedra
- Species: E. controversa

Binomial name
- Euphaedra controversa Hecq, 1997

Synonyms
- Euphaedra (Euphaedrana) controversa

Species of butterfly

Euphaedra controversa, the controversial Themis forester, is a butterfly in the family Nymphalidae. It is found in Nigeria (the Cross River loop) and western Cameroon. The habitat consists of forests.
