= Euphaedra sardetta =

Scientific classification
- Kingdom: Animalia
- Phylum: Arthropoda
- Class: Insecta
- Order: Lepidoptera
- Family: Nymphalidae
- Genus: Euphaedra
- Species: E. sardetta

Binomial name
- Euphaedra sardetta Berger, 1981

Synonyms
- Euphaedra themis var. sardetta f. implete Gaede, 1916; Euphaedra themis var. sardetta Gaede, 1916

Species of butterfly

Euphaedra sardetta is a butterfly in the family Nymphalidae. It is found in Cameroon, the Democratic Republic of the Congo (Uele).
