= Euphaedra regularis =

Scientific classification
- Kingdom: Animalia
- Phylum: Arthropoda
- Class: Insecta
- Order: Lepidoptera
- Family: Nymphalidae
- Genus: Euphaedra
- Species: E. regularis

Binomial name
- Euphaedra regularis Hecq, 1983

Synonyms
- Euphaedra (Euphaedrana) regularis

Species of butterfly

Euphaedra regularis is a butterfly in the family Nymphalidae. It is found in the Democratic Republic of the Congo (Sankuru and Kasai).
