= Euphaedra subprotea =

Scientific classification
- Kingdom: Animalia
- Phylum: Arthropoda
- Class: Insecta
- Order: Lepidoptera
- Family: Nymphalidae
- Genus: Euphaedra
- Species: E. subprotea

Binomial name
- Euphaedra subprotea Hecq, 1986

Synonyms
- Euphaedra (Euphaedrana) subprotea

Species of butterfly

Euphaedra subprotea is a butterfly in the family Nymphalidae. It is found in Cameroon, Gabon, the Republic of the Congo and the western part of the Democratic Republic of the Congo.
