= Euphaedra sabinae =

Scientific classification
- Kingdom: Animalia
- Phylum: Arthropoda
- Class: Insecta
- Order: Lepidoptera
- Family: Nymphalidae
- Genus: Euphaedra
- Species: E. sabinae

Binomial name
- Euphaedra sabinae Faravel, 2002

Species of butterfly

Euphaedra sabinae is a butterfly in the family Nymphalidae. It is found in Gabon.
