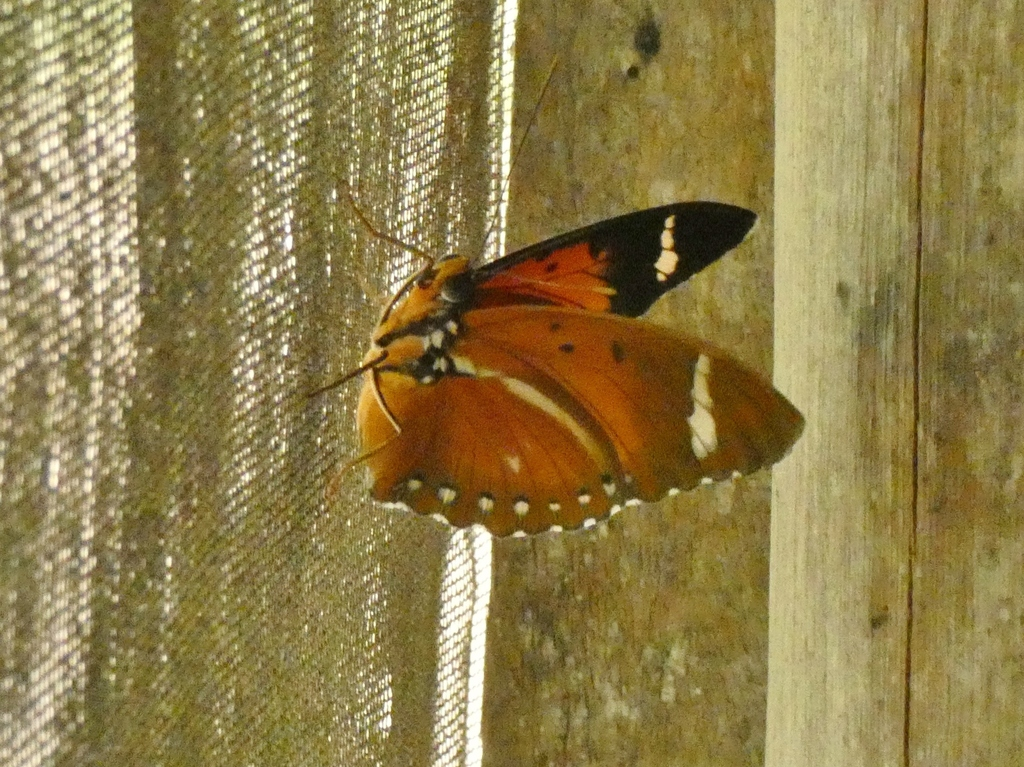

Scientific classification
- Kingdom: Animalia
- Phylum: Arthropoda
- Clade: Pancrustacea
- Class: Insecta
- Order: Lepidoptera
- Family: Nymphalidae
- Genus: Euphaedra
- Species: E. mambili

Binomial name
- Euphaedra mambili Hecq, 2001

= Euphaedra mambili =

Species of butterfly

Euphaedra mambili, the Mambili euphaedra, is a butterfly in the family Nymphalidae. It is found in eastern Nigeria, Cameroon and the Republic of the Congo. The habitat consists of forests.
