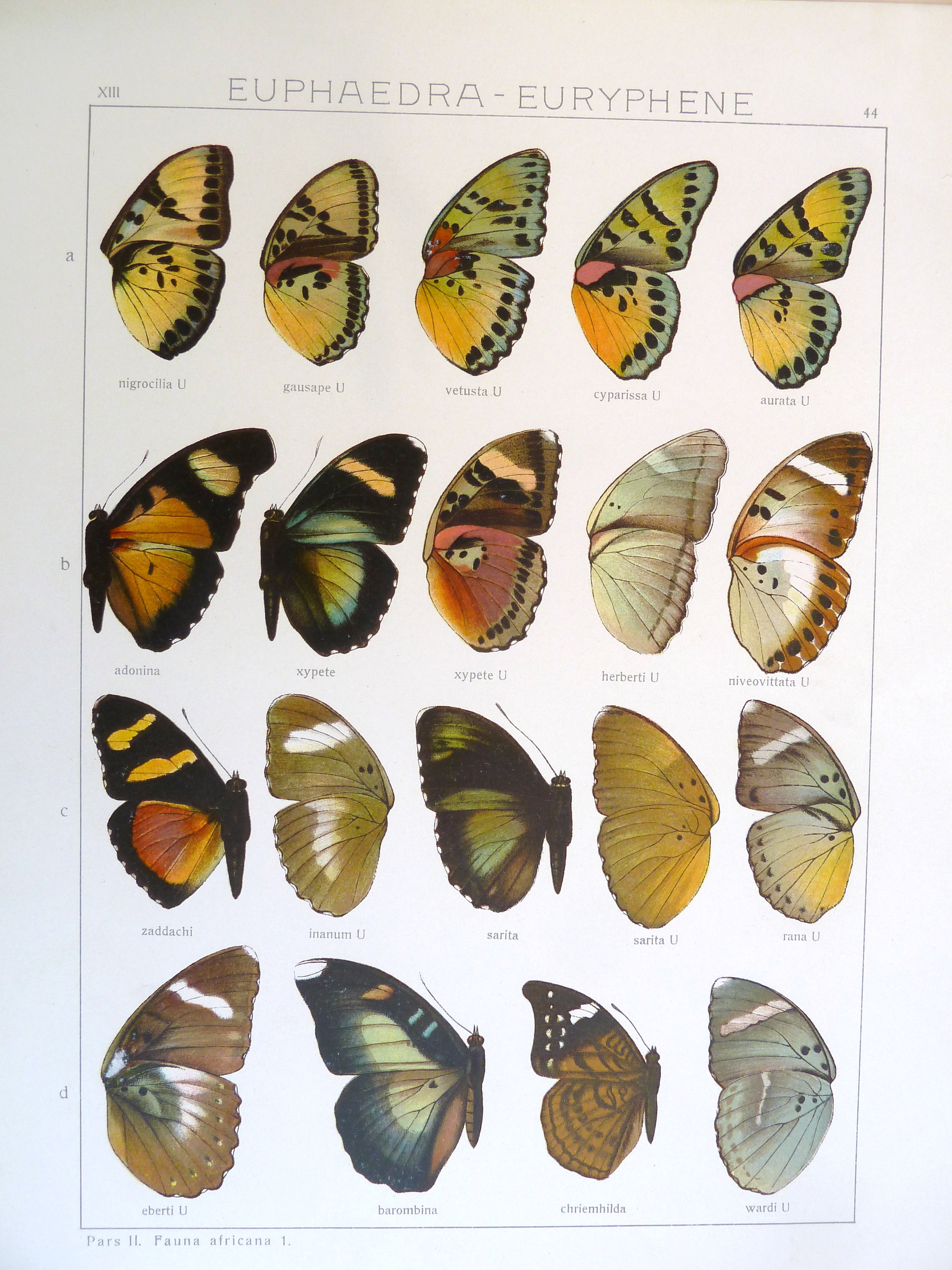
- In Adalbert Seitz's Fauna Africana

Scientific classification
- Kingdom: Animalia
- Phylum: Arthropoda
- Class: Insecta
- Order: Lepidoptera
- Family: Nymphalidae
- Genus: Euphaedra
- Species: E. niveovittata

Binomial name
- Euphaedra niveovittata Overlaet, 1955

Synonyms
- Euphaedra (Euphaedrana) niveovittata; Euphaedra themis ab. niveovittata Aurivillius, 1903

= Euphaedra niveovittata =

Species of butterfly

Euphaedra niveovittata is a butterfly in the family Nymphalidae. It is found in the southern part of the Democratic Republic of the Congo.
