= Euphaedra dargeana =

Scientific classification
- Domain: Eukaryota
- Kingdom: Animalia
- Phylum: Arthropoda
- Class: Insecta
- Order: Lepidoptera
- Family: Nymphalidae
- Genus: Euphaedra
- Species: E. dargeana

Binomial name
- Euphaedra dargeana Hecq, 1980

Synonyms
- Euphaedra (Euphaedrana) dargeana

Species of butterfly

Euphaedra dargeana, or Darge's Ceres forester, is a butterfly in the family Nymphalidae. It is found in Nigeria, Cameroon, Gabon and possibly the northern part of the Democratic Republic of the Congo. The habitat consists of forests.
