= Euphaedra subferruginea =

Scientific classification
- Kingdom: Animalia
- Phylum: Arthropoda
- Class: Insecta
- Order: Lepidoptera
- Family: Nymphalidae
- Genus: Euphaedra
- Species: E. subferruginea

Binomial name
- Euphaedra subferruginea Guillaumin, 1976

Synonyms
- Euphaedra zampa subferruginea Guillaumin, 1976; Euphaedra (Euphaedrana) subferruginea

Species of butterfly

Euphaedra subferruginea is a butterfly in the family Nymphalidae. It is found in the Central African Republic and the Democratic Republic of the Congo (Ubangi).
