= Euphaedra morini =

Scientific classification
- Kingdom: Animalia
- Phylum: Arthropoda
- Class: Insecta
- Order: Lepidoptera
- Family: Nymphalidae
- Genus: Euphaedra
- Species: E. morini

Binomial name
- Euphaedra morini Hecq, 1983

Synonyms
- Euphaedra (Gausapia) morini

Species of butterfly

Euphaedra morini is a butterfly in the family Nymphalidae. It is found in the Democratic Republic of the Congo (Shaba) and possibly Angola.

== Similar species ==
Other members of the Euphaedra zaddachii species group q.v.

== Description ==
Images Tervuren
