= Euphaedra apparata =

Scientific classification
- Kingdom: Animalia
- Phylum: Arthropoda
- Class: Insecta
- Order: Lepidoptera
- Family: Nymphalidae
- Genus: Euphaedra
- Species: E. apparata

Binomial name
- Euphaedra apparata Hecq, 1982

Synonyms
- Euphaedra (Euphaedrana) apparata

Species of butterfly

Euphaedra apparata is a butterfly in the family Nymphalidae. It is found in the Democratic Republic of the Congo (Sankuru and Kasai).
