= Euphaedra athena =

Scientific classification
- Kingdom: Animalia
- Phylum: Arthropoda
- Class: Insecta
- Order: Lepidoptera
- Family: Nymphalidae
- Genus: Euphaedra
- Species: E. athena

Binomial name
- Euphaedra athena Hecq & Joly, 2003

Synonyms
- Euphaedra (Gausapia) athena

Species of butterfly

Euphaedra athena, the Nigerian striped forester, is a butterfly in the family Nymphalidae. It is found in Nigeria. The habitat consists of dense forests.

Adults feed on fallen fruit.

== Similar species ==
Other members of the Euphaedra zaddachii species group q.v.
