= Euphaedra clio =

Scientific classification
- Kingdom: Animalia
- Phylum: Arthropoda
- Class: Insecta
- Order: Lepidoptera
- Family: Nymphalidae
- Genus: Euphaedra
- Species: E. clio

Binomial name
- Euphaedra clio Hecq, 1981

Synonyms
- Euphaedra (Gausapia) clio

Species of butterfly

Euphaedra clio is a butterfly in the family Nymphalidae. It is found in the southern part of the Republic of the Congo, the Central African Republic and the Democratic Republic of the Congo.
