= Euphaedra laguerrei =

Scientific classification
- Kingdom: Animalia
- Phylum: Arthropoda
- Class: Insecta
- Order: Lepidoptera
- Family: Nymphalidae
- Genus: Euphaedra
- Species: E. laguerrei

Binomial name
- Euphaedra laguerrei Hecq, 1979

Synonyms
- Euphaedra (Euphaedrana) laguerrei; Euphaedra perdita Hecq, 1986

Species of butterfly

Euphaedra laguerrei, the insipid Themis forester, is a butterfly in the family Nymphalidae. It is found in Senegal, Burkina Faso, Sierra Leone and western Ivory Coast. The habitat consists of forests.

The larvae feed on Cola laurifolia.
