= Euphaedra alava =

Scientific classification
- Kingdom: Animalia
- Phylum: Arthropoda
- Class: Insecta
- Order: Lepidoptera
- Family: Nymphalidae
- Genus: Euphaedra
- Species: E. alava

Binomial name
- Euphaedra alava Hecq, 2000

Synonyms
- Euphadra alava Hecq, 2000; Euphaedra (Euphaedrana) alava

Species of butterfly

Euphaedra alava is a butterfly in the family Nymphalidae. It is found in Equatorial Guinea.
