= Euphaedra opulenta =

Scientific classification
- Kingdom: Animalia
- Phylum: Arthropoda
- Class: Insecta
- Order: Lepidoptera
- Family: Nymphalidae
- Genus: Euphaedra
- Species: E. opulenta

Binomial name
- Euphaedra opulenta Hecq & Van de Weghe, 2005

Species of butterfly

Euphaedra opulenta is a butterfly in the family Nymphalidae. It is found in Cameroon and Gabon.
