= Euphaedra occulta =

Scientific classification
- Kingdom: Animalia
- Phylum: Arthropoda
- Class: Insecta
- Order: Lepidoptera
- Family: Nymphalidae
- Genus: Euphaedra
- Species: E. occulta

Binomial name
- Euphaedra occulta Hecq, 1982

Synonyms
- Euphaedra (Euphaedrana) occulta

Species of butterfly

Euphaedra occulta is a butterfly in the family Nymphalidae. It is found in Guinea.

== Taxonomy ==
It is possibly just an aberration of Euphaedra janetta.
