= Euphaedra appositiva =

Scientific classification
- Kingdom: Animalia
- Phylum: Arthropoda
- Class: Insecta
- Order: Lepidoptera
- Family: Nymphalidae
- Genus: Euphaedra
- Species: E. appositiva

Binomial name
- Euphaedra appositiva Hecq, 1982

Synonyms
- Euphaedra (Euphaedrana) appositiva

Species of butterfly

Euphaedra appositiva is a butterfly in the family Nymphalidae. It is found in Cameroon.
