= Euphaedra splendens =

Scientific classification
- Kingdom: Animalia
- Phylum: Arthropoda
- Class: Insecta
- Order: Lepidoptera
- Family: Nymphalidae
- Genus: Euphaedra
- Species: E. splendens

Binomial name
- Euphaedra splendens Hecq, 1982

Synonyms
- Euphaedra (Euphaedrana) splendens

Species of butterfly

Euphaedra splendens, the splendid Themis forester, is a butterfly in the family Nymphalidae. It is found in Ghana, Nigeria, Cameroon, Equatorial Guinea and the Republic of the Congo. The habitat consists of wetter forests.

== Subspecies ==
- Euphaedra splendens splendens (Nigeria, Cameroon, Bioko, northern Congo)
- Euphaedra splendens ghanaensis Hecq & Joly, 2004 (Ghana)
