= Euphaedra castanoides =

Scientific classification
- Kingdom: Animalia
- Phylum: Arthropoda
- Class: Insecta
- Order: Lepidoptera
- Family: Nymphalidae
- Genus: Euphaedra
- Species: E. castanoides

Binomial name
- Euphaedra castanoides Hecq, 1985

Synonyms
- Euphaedra (Euphaedrana) castanoides

Species of butterfly

Euphaedra castanoides, or the chestnut orange forester, is a butterfly in the family Nymphalidae. It is found in Nigeria, Cameroon, the Democratic Republic of the Congo and Tanzania. The habitat consists of forests.

The larvae possibly feed on Sapindaceae species.

== Subspecies ==
- Euphaedra castanoides castanoides (Cameroon, Democratic Republic of the Congo: Shaba, Tanzania)
- Euphaedra castanoides deficiens Hecq, 1997 (Ethiopia)
- Euphaedra castanoides gashaka Hecq, 1996 (Nigeria: Mambilla Plateau)
