= Euphaedra luteofasciata =

Scientific classification
- Kingdom: Animalia
- Phylum: Arthropoda
- Class: Insecta
- Order: Lepidoptera
- Family: Nymphalidae
- Genus: Euphaedra
- Species: E. luteofasciata

Binomial name
- Euphaedra luteofasciata Hecq, 1979

Synonyms
- Euphaedra (Proteuphaedra) luteofasciata; Euphaedra luperca ab. luteofasciata Bartel, 1905; Euphaedra luperca ab. variegata Aurivillius, 1912; Euphaedra luperca ab. suffusa Rothschild, 1918; Euphaedra luperca variegata d'Abrera, 1980

Species of butterfly

Euphaedra luteofasciata is a butterfly in the family Nymphalidae. It is found in Cameroon, Gabon and the Democratic Republic of the Congo (Mayumbe). Images: Types Royal Museum Central Africa It was formerly variously placed under Euphaedra luperca
