= Euphaedra ochrovirens =

Scientific classification
- Kingdom: Animalia
- Phylum: Arthropoda
- Class: Insecta
- Order: Lepidoptera
- Family: Nymphalidae
- Genus: Euphaedra
- Species: E. ochrovirens

Binomial name
- Euphaedra ochrovirens Hecq, 1984

Synonyms
- Euphaedra (Euphaedrana) ochrovirens

Species of butterfly

Euphaedra ochrovirens is a butterfly in the family Nymphalidae. It is found in Cameroon and the Democratic Republic of the Congo.
