= Euphaedra minuta =

Scientific classification
- Kingdom: Animalia
- Phylum: Arthropoda
- Clade: Pancrustacea
- Class: Insecta
- Order: Lepidoptera
- Family: Nymphalidae
- Genus: Euphaedra
- Species: E. minuta

Binomial name
- Euphaedra minuta Hecq, 1982

Synonyms
- Euphaedra (Euphaedrana) minuta

Species of butterfly

Euphaedra minuta, the Côte d'Ivoire forester, is a butterfly in the family Nymphalidae. It is found in Sierra Leone, Ivory Coast and Ghana. Its habitat consists of wetter forests.

Torben Larsen developed a species numbering system for his 2005 publication Butterflies of West Africa. This species is #1071. The 'Larsen' numbers have since been used with permission in A Sharp Eye on Butterflies of Ghana.
