= Euphaedra pervaga =

Scientific classification
- Kingdom: Animalia
- Phylum: Arthropoda
- Class: Insecta
- Order: Lepidoptera
- Family: Nymphalidae
- Genus: Euphaedra
- Species: E. pervaga

Binomial name
- Euphaedra pervaga Hecq, 1996

Synonyms
- Euphaedra (Xypetana) pervaga

Species of butterfly

Euphaedra pervaga, the Cameroon pink forester, is a butterfly in the family Nymphalidae. It is found in Cameroon. The habitat consists of forests.
