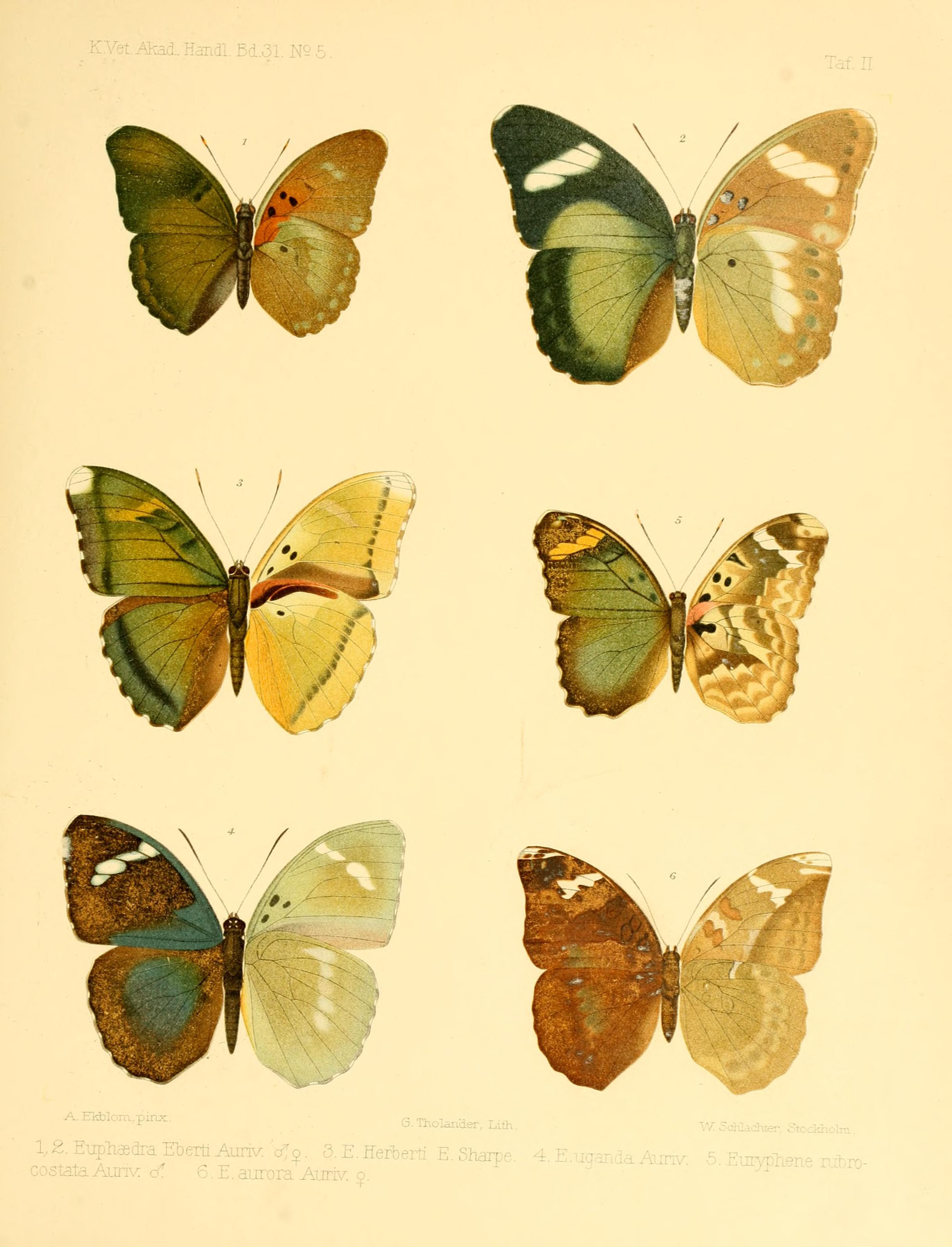
- Euphaedra uganda in Rhopalocera Aethiopica Aurivillius, 1895

Scientific classification
- Kingdom: Animalia
- Phylum: Arthropoda
- Class: Insecta
- Order: Lepidoptera
- Family: Nymphalidae
- Genus: Euphaedra
- Species: E. uganda

Binomial name
- Euphaedra uganda Aurivillius, 1895

Synonyms
- Euphaedra (Euphaedrana) uganda

= Euphaedra uganda =

Species of butterfly

Euphaedra uganda is a butterfly in the family Nymphalidae. It is found in Uganda and Tanzania.

== Description ==
E. Uganda Auriv. is a beautiful species, somewhat recalling preussi above. Both wings above blackish with bluish gloss; in the male the base of the forewing as far as vein 2, the hindmargin to beyond the middle and the costal margin to the cell, together with the hindwing to far beyond the middle, are a beautiful and intensive blue, in the female these parts are faintly dark violet and only bluish in the middle; the subapical band of the forewing is narrow and consists of five white, bluish-edged spots. The under surface is light bluish grey-green with 1-3 black spots in the cell of the forewing and a white median band on the hind wing, composed of rounded spots and sometimes little distinct, extending from vein 7 to vein 3. Uganda.

== Biology ==
The habitat consists of Afrotropical forest.

The larvae feed on Deinbollia fulvotomentella and Allophylus subcoriaceus.

== Subspecies ==
- Euphaedra uganda uganda (Uganda) endemic, uncommon
- Euphaedra uganda minzuru Hecq, 1992 (north-western Tanzania) rare
