= Euphaedra luafa =

Scientific classification
- Kingdom: Animalia
- Phylum: Arthropoda
- Class: Insecta
- Order: Lepidoptera
- Family: Nymphalidae
- Genus: Euphaedra
- Species: E. luafa

Binomial name
- Euphaedra luafa Oremans, 1998

Synonyms
- Euphaedra (Euphaedrana) luafa

Species of butterfly

Euphaedra luafa is a butterfly in the family Nymphalidae. It is found in the Democratic Republic of the Congo.
