= Euphaedra karschi =

Scientific classification
- Kingdom: Animalia
- Phylum: Arthropoda
- Class: Insecta
- Order: Lepidoptera
- Family: Nymphalidae
- Genus: Euphaedra
- Species: E. karschi

Binomial name
- Euphaedra karschi Bartel, 1905

Synonyms
- Euphaedra (Xypetana) karschi

Species of butterfly

Euphaedra karschi is a butterfly in the family Nymphalidae. It was described by Max Bartel in 1905. It is found in Cameroon, Gabon and the Democratic Republic of the Congo.

== Description ==
E. karschi Bartel, like xypete, has a white apical spot on the forewing and the greater part of the hindwing beneath red; the subapical band of the forewing is whitish, very narrow (about as in preussi) and sharply defined; it consists of 3 small anterior spots and a large one, placed more distally, in cellule 3. On the underside of the fore wing the subapical band is white and proximally only narrowly bordered with black; the under surface of the hindwing coloured and marked almost exactly as in the typical xypete. Probably only a form of the latter. North-West Cameroons.

It is a rare species.

== Subspecies ==
- Euphaedra karschi karschi (Cameroon, northern Democratic Republic of the Congo)
- Euphaedra karschi sankuruensis Hecq, 1980 (central and southern Democratic Republic of the Congo)

== Etymology ==
The specific name honours Ferdinand Karsch.
