= Euphaedra barnsi =

Scientific classification
- Kingdom: Animalia
- Phylum: Arthropoda
- Class: Insecta
- Order: Lepidoptera
- Family: Nymphalidae
- Genus: Euphaedra
- Species: E. barnsi

Binomial name
- Euphaedra barnsi Hecq, 1983

Synonyms
- Euphaedra christyi barnsi Joicey & Talbot, 1922; Euphaedra (Gausapia) barnsi

Species of butterfly

Euphaedra barnsi is a butterfly in the family Nymphalidae. It is found in the Democratic Republic of the Congo (Kivu) and Rwanda.

== Similar species ==
Other members of the Euphaedra zaddachii species group q.v.
