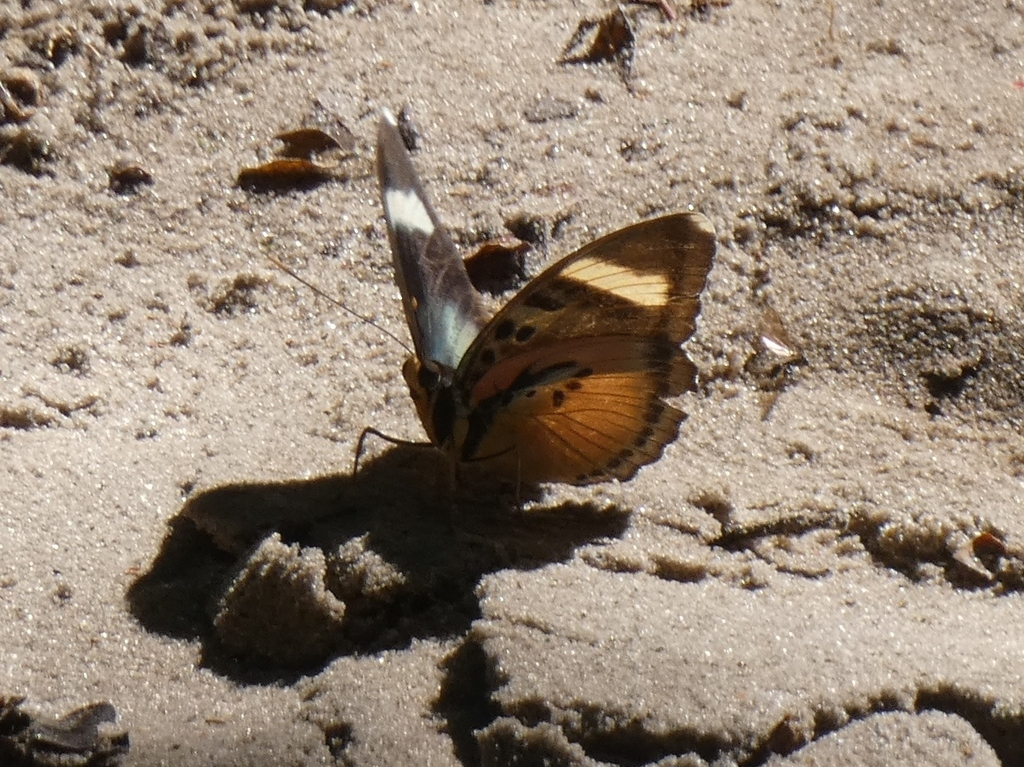

Scientific classification
- Kingdom: Animalia
- Phylum: Arthropoda
- Class: Insecta
- Order: Lepidoptera
- Family: Nymphalidae
- Genus: Euphaedra
- Species: E. acuta

Binomial name
- Euphaedra acuta Hecq, 1977

Synonyms
- Euphaedra (Xypetana) acuta

= Euphaedra acuta =

Species of butterfly

Euphaedra acuta, the acute pink forester, is a butterfly in the family Nymphalidae. It is found in south-eastern Nigeria, western Cameroon and the Democratic Republic of the Congo (Ubangi). The habitat consists of forests. Images: Types Royal Museum Central Africa
