= Euphaedra mbamou =

Scientific classification
- Kingdom: Animalia
- Phylum: Arthropoda
- Class: Insecta
- Order: Lepidoptera
- Family: Nymphalidae
- Genus: Euphaedra
- Species: E. mbamou

Binomial name
- Euphaedra mbamou Hecq, 1987

Synonyms
- Euphaedra morini mbamou Hecq, 1987; Euphaedra (Gausapia) mbamou

Species of butterfly

Euphaedra mbamou is a species of butterfly in the family Nymphalidae. It is endemic to the Republic of the Congo and the Democratic Republic of the Congo (Bas-Zaire).

== Similar species ==
Other members of the Euphaedra zaddachii species group q.v.
