= Euphaedra subprocera =

Scientific classification
- Kingdom: Animalia
- Phylum: Arthropoda
- Class: Insecta
- Order: Lepidoptera
- Family: Nymphalidae
- Genus: Euphaedra
- Species: E. subprocera

Binomial name
- Euphaedra subprocera Hecq, 1984

Synonyms
- Euphaedra (Euphaedrana) subprocera

Species of butterfly

Euphaedra subprocera is a butterfly in the family Nymphalidae. It is found in the central and eastern part of the Democratic Republic of the Congo.
