= Euphaedra stellata =

Scientific classification
- Kingdom: Animalia
- Phylum: Arthropoda
- Class: Insecta
- Order: Lepidoptera
- Family: Nymphalidae
- Genus: Euphaedra
- Species: E. stellata

Binomial name
- Euphaedra stellata Hecq, 1991

Synonyms
- Euphaedra (Euphaedrana) stellata

Species of butterfly

Euphaedra stellata is a butterfly in the family Nymphalidae. It is found in Cameroon. The habitat consists of forests.
