= Euphaedra ochracea =

Scientific classification
- Kingdom: Animalia
- Phylum: Arthropoda
- Class: Insecta
- Order: Lepidoptera
- Family: Nymphalidae
- Genus: Euphaedra
- Species: E. ochracea

Binomial name
- Euphaedra ochracea Hecq, 1980

Synonyms
- Euphaedra (Euphaedrana) ochracea

Species of butterfly

Euphaedra ochracea is a butterfly in the family Nymphalidae. It is found in the Democratic Republic of the Congo (Equateur, Sankuru and the north-eastern part of the country).
