= Euphaedra vandeweghei =

Scientific classification
- Kingdom: Animalia
- Phylum: Arthropoda
- Class: Insecta
- Order: Lepidoptera
- Family: Nymphalidae
- Genus: Euphaedra
- Species: E. vandeweghei

Binomial name
- Euphaedra vandeweghei Hecq, 2004

Synonyms
- Euphaedra (Euphaedrana) vandeweghei

Species of butterfly

Euphaedra vandeweghei is a butterfly in the family Nymphalidae. It is found in Gabon.
