= Euphaedra sangbae =

Scientific classification
- Kingdom: Animalia
- Phylum: Arthropoda
- Class: Insecta
- Order: Lepidoptera
- Family: Nymphalidae
- Genus: Euphaedra
- Species: E. sangbae

Binomial name
- Euphaedra sangbae Hecq, 1996

Synonyms
- Euphaedra (Euphaedrana) sangbae

Species of butterfly

Euphaedra sangbae is a butterfly in the family Nymphalidae. It is found in the northern part of the Central African Republic.
