= Euphaedra ubangi =

Scientific classification
- Kingdom: Animalia
- Phylum: Arthropoda
- Class: Insecta
- Order: Lepidoptera
- Family: Nymphalidae
- Genus: Euphaedra
- Species: E. ubangi

Binomial name
- Euphaedra ubangi Hecq, 1974

Synonyms
- Euphaedra (Xypetana) ubangi

Species of butterfly

Euphaedra ubangi is a butterfly in the family Nymphalidae. It is found in Mongala in the Democratic Republic of the Congo.
