= Euphaedra larseni =

Scientific classification
- Kingdom: Animalia
- Phylum: Arthropoda
- Class: Insecta
- Order: Lepidoptera
- Family: Nymphalidae
- Genus: Euphaedra
- Species: E. larseni

Binomial name
- Euphaedra larseni Hecq, 2005

Species of butterfly

Euphaedra larseni is a butterfly in the family Nymphalidae. It is found in Nigeria.
