= Euphaedra delera =

Scientific classification
- Domain: Eukaryota
- Kingdom: Animalia
- Phylum: Arthropoda
- Class: Insecta
- Order: Lepidoptera
- Family: Nymphalidae
- Genus: Euphaedra
- Species: E. delera

Binomial name
- Euphaedra delera Hecq, 1989

Synonyms
- Euphaedra (Euphaedrana) delera; Euphaedra ceroides f. delera Hecq, 1983

Species of butterfly

Euphaedra delera, the Brown Ceres forester, is a butterfly in the family Nymphalidae. It is found in central Ivory Coast. The habitat consists of forests.

The larvae feed on Sorindeia warneckei.
