= Euphaedra ombrophila =

Scientific classification
- Kingdom: Animalia
- Phylum: Arthropoda
- Class: Insecta
- Order: Lepidoptera
- Family: Nymphalidae
- Genus: Euphaedra
- Species: E. ombrophila

Binomial name
- Euphaedra ombrophila Hecq, 1981

Synonyms
- Euphaedra calliope ombrophila Hecq, 1981; Euphaedra (Gausapia) ombrophila

Species of butterfly

Euphaedra ombrophila is a butterfly in the family Nymphalidae. It is found in the northern part of the Republic of the Congo.
