= Euphaedra wissmanni =

Scientific classification
- Kingdom: Animalia
- Phylum: Arthropoda
- Class: Insecta
- Order: Lepidoptera
- Family: Nymphalidae
- Genus: Euphaedra
- Species: E. wissmanni

Binomial name
- Euphaedra wissmanni Niepelt, 1906

Species of butterfly

Euphaedra wissmanni is a butterfly in the family Nymphalidae. It is found in the southern part of the Democratic Republic of the Congo.

== Description ==
E. wissmanni Niep.Forewing olive-brown above; the apical band, which does not quite reach the distal margin, glossy lilac-blue; costal margin, apex and base with intensive lilac gloss; the black transverse streak in the cell very weakly marked; the dark olive-brown colour at the inner margin notched with light colour. Hindwing lighter above with dark border; the latter basally bounded by the weakly black marked submarginal spots; the black transverse cell-spot showing through faintly; a dull lilac gloss in and at either side of the cell from the base to the dark border; distal margin excised, with black and white fringes. Forewing dirty yellow-brown beneath, in the apex white; apical band whitish, blurred; this as well as the apex with slight lilac gloss; in the cell 3 strong black spots, one placed towards the base, the other two triangularly distad; further forwards a black transverse streak closing the cell; marginal spots very weak, marked with white. Hindwing orange-yellow beneath, the part between cell and costal margin bearing a white band, which, beginning with a broad spot running parallel with the costal margin, becomes gradually narrower to the middle of the cell, is weakly defined basally and fades out towards the distal margin; the cell bears basally 2 vertically placed dots, the lower half as large as the upper; clistally to these a thick black streak; submarginal spots faintly white, the first 5 basally bordered with dark; at both sides of the precostal black markings, frosted with lilac; a dull black comma-shaped streak bounds the anterior spot in the band basally; the half of the wing which bears the band, as well as the latter, with slight lilac gloss. Congo: Kassai River.
