= Euphaedra uniformis =

Scientific classification
- Kingdom: Animalia
- Phylum: Arthropoda
- Clade: Pancrustacea
- Class: Insecta
- Order: Lepidoptera
- Family: Nymphalidae
- Genus: Euphaedra
- Species: E. uniformis

Binomial name
- Euphaedra uniformis Berger, 1981

Synonyms
- Euphaedra (Euphaedrana) uniformis; Euphaedra themis campaspe ab. uniformis Neustetter, 1916

Species of butterfly

Euphaedra uniformis is a butterfly in the family Nymphalidae. It is found in Cameroon, Gabon and the northern part of the Democratic Republic of the Congo. The habitat consists of wet forests.
