= Euphaedra acutoides =

Scientific classification
- Kingdom: Animalia
- Phylum: Arthropoda
- Clade: Pancrustacea
- Class: Insecta
- Order: Lepidoptera
- Family: Nymphalidae
- Genus: Euphaedra
- Species: E. acutoides

Binomial name
- Euphaedra acutoides Hecq, 1996

Synonyms
- Euphaedra (Xypetana) acutoides

Species of butterfly

Euphaedra acutoides is a butterfly in the family Nymphalidae. It is found in the Democratic Republic of the Congo.
