= Euphaedra cooksoni =

Scientific classification
- Domain: Eukaryota
- Kingdom: Animalia
- Phylum: Arthropoda
- Class: Insecta
- Order: Lepidoptera
- Family: Nymphalidae
- Genus: Euphaedra
- Species: E. cooksoni

Binomial name
- Euphaedra cooksoni H. Druce, 1905

Synonyms
- Euphaedra (Euphaedrana) cooksoni

Species of butterfly

Euphaedra cooksoni is a butterfly in the family Nymphalidae first described by Herbert Druce in 1905. It is found in the Democratic Republic of the Congo (Katanga Province), Tanzania and Zambia.

== Description ==
E. cooksoni Druce. Body above with white dots; forewing above black, at the costal margin grey-green; subapical band white; the hindmarginal spot broadly brownish chrome-yellow; hind-wing above brown- yellow with broad black marginal band and two blue submarginal spots near the hinder angle. Forewing beneath yellow, suffused with blackish green and with three black spots in the cell; hindwing beneath chrome-yellow with a black spot at the base and a black dot in the cell; a broad white submarginal band runs from the base to the apex, where it becomes quite narrow; two indistinct white spots at the apex of the cell and bluish white submarginal spots. Rhodesia.

== Similar species ==
Other members of the eleus species group q.v.
