= Euphaedra castanea =

Scientific classification
- Kingdom: Animalia
- Phylum: Arthropoda
- Clade: Pancrustacea
- Class: Insecta
- Order: Lepidoptera
- Family: Nymphalidae
- Genus: Euphaedra
- Species: E. castanea

Binomial name
- Euphaedra castanea Berger, 1981

Synonyms
- Euphaedra preussi f. castanea Rothschild, 1918

Species of butterfly

Euphaedra castanea is a butterfly in the family Nymphalidae. It is found in the Democratic Republic of the Congo (Lualaba and Shaba).

Described as Euphaedra preussi form castanea form. nov.

Male: All green areas above are replaced by rufous chestnut, saturated and suffused with purple-blue, tornal area of hindwing and a submarginal row of spots blue. On forewing, there are 3 black spots in cell above.

Habitat: Kongour Forest, Manyema, Congo Free State (R. Grauer), 1 male.

Raised to species by Berger.
