= List of butterflies of Cameroon =

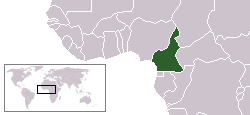
Location of Cameroon

This is a list of butterflies of Cameroon. About 1,593 species are known from Cameroon, 110 of which are endemic.

== Papilionidae ==
=== Papilioninae ===
==== Papilionini ====
- Papilio antimachus Drury, 1782
- Papilio zalmoxis Hewitson, 1864
- Papilio nireus Linnaeus, 1758
- Papilio charopus Westwood, 1843
- Papilio chrapkowskoides nurettini Koçak, 1983
- Papilio sosia sosia Rothschild & Jordan, 1903
- Papilio sosia pulchra Berger, 1950
- Papilio cynorta Fabricius, 1793
- Papilio plagiatus Aurivillius, 1898
- Papilio dardanus Brown, 1776
- Papilio phorcas congoanus Rothschild, 1896
- Papilio rex schultzei Aurivillius, 1904
- Papilio zenobia Fabricius, 1775
- Papilio cyproeofila praecyola Suffert, 1904
- Papilio filaprae Suffert, 1904
- Papilio gallienus Distant, 1879
- Papilio mechowi Dewitz, 1881
- Papilio demodocus Esper, [1798]
- Papilio echerioides zoroastres Druce, 1878
- Papilio hesperus Westwood, 1843
- Papilio menestheus Drury, 1773
- Papilio lormieri Distant, 1874
- Papilio andronicus Ward, 1871

==== Leptocercini ====
- Graphium antheus (Cramer, 1779)
- Graphium policenes policenes (Cramer, 1775)
- Graphium policenes telloi Hecq, 1999
- Graphium biokoensis (Gauthier, 1984)
- Graphium policenoides (Holland, 1892)
- Graphium illyris hamatus (Joicey & Talbot, 1918)
- Graphium angolanus baronis (Ungemach, 1932)
- Graphium ridleyanus (White, 1843)
- Graphium leonidas (Fabricius, 1793)
- Graphium tynderaeus (Fabricius, 1793)
- Graphium latreillianus theorini (Aurivillius, 1881)
- Graphium adamastor (Boisduval, 1836)
- Graphium agamedes (Westwood, 1842)
- Graphium schubotzi schubotzi (Schultze, 1913)
- Graphium schubotzi maculata Libert, 2007
- Graphium almansor escherichi (Gaede, 1915)
- Graphium auriger (Butler, 1876)
- Graphium fulleri fulleri (Grose-Smith, 1883)
- Graphium fulleri boulleti (Le Cerf, 1912)
- Graphium ucalegonides (Staudinger, 1884)
- Graphium hachei hachei (Dewitz, 1881)
- Graphium hachei moebii (Suffert, 1904)
- Graphium ucalegon (Hewitson, 1865)
- Graphium simoni (Aurivillius, 1899)

== Pieridae ==
=== Pseudopontiinae ===
- Pseudopontia paradoxa (Felder & Felder, 1869)

=== Coliadinae ===
- Eurema brigitta (Stoll, [1780])
- Eurema hapale (Mabille, 1882)
- Eurema hecabe solifera (Butler, 1875)
- Eurema senegalensis (Boisduval, 1836)
- Catopsilia florella (Fabricius, 1775)
- Colias electo manengoubensis Darge, 1968

=== Pierinae ===
- Colotis antevippe (Boisduval, 1836)
- Colotis celimene sudanicus (Aurivillius, 1905)
- Colotis elgonensis glauningi (Schultze, 1909)
- Colotis euippe (Linnaeus, 1758)
- Colotis protomedia (Klug, 1829)
- Nepheronia argia (Fabricius, 1775)
- Nepheronia pharis (Boisduval, 1836)
- Nepheronia thalassina verulanus (Ward, 1871)
- Leptosia alcesta (Stoll, [1782])
- Leptosia bastini Hecq, 1997
- Leptosia hybrida Bernardi, 1952
- Leptosia marginea (Mabille, 1890)
- Leptosia nupta (Butler, 1873)
- Leptosia wigginsi pseudalcesta Bernardi, 1965

==== Pierini ====
- Appias epaphia (Cramer, [1779])
- Appias perlucens (Butler, 1898)
- Appias phaola (Doubleday, 1847)
- Appias sabina (Felder & Felder, [1865])
- Appias sylvia (Fabricius, 1775)
- Mylothris agathina richlora Suffert, 1904
- Mylothris alcuana Grünberg, 1910
- Mylothris asphodelus Butler, 1888
- Mylothris basalis Aurivillius, 1906
- Mylothris bernice (Hewitson, 1866)
- Mylothris chloris (Fabricius, 1775)
- Mylothris continua maxima Berger, 1981
- Mylothris elodina Talbot, 1944
- Mylothris flaviana flaviana Grose-Smith, 1898
- Mylothris flaviana interposita Joicey & Talbot, 1921
- Mylothris hilara hilara (Karsch, 1892)
- Mylothris hilara goma Berger, 1981
- Mylothris jacksoni knutssoni Aurivillius, 1891
- Mylothris jaopura Karsch, 1893
- Mylothris nubila (Möschler, 1884)
- Mylothris ochracea Aurivillius, 1895
- Mylothris rembina (Plötz, 1880)
- Mylothris rhodope (Fabricius, 1775)
- Mylothris schumanni Suffert, 1904
- Mylothris sjostedti Aurivillius, 1895
- Mylothris sulphurea Aurivillius, 1895
- Mylothris yulei bansoana Talbot, 1944
- Dixeia capricornus capricornus (Ward, 1871)
- Dixeia capricornus falkensteinii (Dewitz, 1879)
- Dixeia cebron (Ward, 1871)
- Dixeia doxo (Godart, 1819)
- Dixeia orbona (Geyer, [1837])
- Dixeia pigea (Boisduval, 1836)
- Belenois aurota (Fabricius, 1793)
- Belenois calypso dentigera Butler, 1888
- Belenois solilucis Butler, 1874
- Belenois subeida (Felder & Felder, 1865)
- Belenois sudanensis pseudodentigera Berger, 1981
- Belenois theora theora (Doubleday, 1846)
- Belenois theora ratheo (Suffert, 1904)
- Belenois theuszi (Dewitz, 1889)
- Belenois zochalia connexiva (Joicey & Talbot, 1927)

== Lycaenidae ==
=== Miletinae ===
==== Liphyrini ====
- Euliphyra hewitsoni Aurivillius, 1899
- Euliphyra mirifica Holland, 1890
- Euliphyra leucyania (Hewitson, 1874)
- Aslauga bella Bethune-Baker, 1913
- Aslauga aura Druce, 1913
- Aslauga bitjensis Bethune-Baker, 1925
- Aslauga bouyeri Libert, 1994
- Aslauga camerunica Stempffer, 1969
- Aslauga confusa Libert, 1994
- Aslauga febe (Libert, 1994)
- Aslauga imitans Libert, 1994
- Aslauga kallimoides Schultze, 1912
- Aslauga lamborni Bethune-Baker, 1914
- Aslauga marginalis Kirby, 1890
- Aslauga marshalli adamaoua Libert, 1994
- Aslauga modesta Schultze, 1923
- Aslauga pandora Druce, 1913
- Aslauga prouvosti Libert & Bouyer, 1997
- Aslauga purpurascens Holland, 1890
- Aslauga satyroides Libert, 1994
- Aslauga vininga (Hewitson, 1875)

==== Miletini ====
- Megalopalpus angulosus Grünberg, 1910
- Megalopalpus metaleucus Karsch, 1893
- Megalopalpus simplex Röber, 1886
- Megalopalpus zymna (Westwood, 1851)
- Spalgis lemolea lemolea Druce, 1890
- Spalgis lemolea pilos Druce, 1890
- Lachnocnema emperamus (Snellen, 1872)
- Lachnocnema divergens Gaede, 1915
- Lachnocnema vuattouxi Libert, 1996
- Lachnocnema reutlingeri Holland, 1892
- Lachnocnema nigrocellularis Libert, 1996
- Lachnocnema luna Druce, 1910
- Lachnocnema brunea Libert, 1996
- Lachnocnema jolyana Libert, 1996
- Lachnocnema magna Aurivillius, 1895
- Lachnocnema albimacula Libert, 1996
- Lachnocnema exiguus Holland, 1890
- Lachnocnema disrupta Talbot, 1935

=== Poritiinae ===
==== Liptenini ====
- Ptelina carnuta (Hewitson, 1873)
- Pentila maculata maculata (Kirby, 1887)
- Pentila maculata pardalena Druce, 1910
- Pentila amenaidoides (Holland, 1893)
- Pentila auga Karsch, 1895
- Pentila bitje Druce, 1910
- Pentila camerunica Stempffer & Bennett, 1961
- Pentila christina Suffert, 1904
- Pentila cloetensi aspasia Grünberg, 1910
- Pentila fallax Bethune-Baker, 1915
- Pentila fidonioides Schultze, 1923
- Pentila glagoessa (Holland, 1893)
- Pentila hewitsoni limbata (Holland, 1893)
- Pentila inconspicua Druce, 1910
- Pentila mesia Hulstaert, 1924
- Pentila nero (Grose-Smith & Kirby, 1894)
- Pentila occidentalium Aurivillius, 1899
- Pentila pauli pauli Staudinger, 1888
- Pentila pauli leopardina Schultze, 1923
- Pentila pseudorotha Stempffer & Bennett, 1961
- Pentila rotha marianna Suffert, 1904
- Pentila tachyroides Dewitz, 1879
- Pentila umangiana prodita Schultze, 1923
- Liptenara batesi Bethune-Baker, 1915
- Telipna acraea acraea (Westwood, [1851])
- Telipna acraea fervida (Grose-Smith & Kirby, 1890)
- Telipna albofasciata Aurivillius, 1910
- Telipna ja Bethune-Baker, 1926
- Telipna cameroonensis Jackson, 1969
- Telipna atrinervis Hulstaert, 1924
- Telipna hollandi exsuperia Hulstaert, 1924
- Telipna citrimaculata Schultze, 1916
- Telipna transverstigma Druce, 1910
- Telipna sanguinea (Plötz, 1880)
- Telipna consanguinea Rebel, 1914
- Telipna erica Suffert, 1904
- Telipna nyanza katangae Stempffer, 1961
- Telipna ruspinoides Schultze, 1923
- Ornipholidotos kirbyi (Aurivillius. 1895)
- Ornipholidotos ugandae goodi Libert, 2000
- Ornipholidotos bitjeensis Stempffer, 1957
- Ornipholidotos bakotae Stempffer, 1962
- Ornipholidotos ayissii Libert, 2005
- Ornipholidotos etoumbi Stempffer, 1967
- Ornipholidotos katangae kelle Stempffer, 1967
- Ornipholidotos nigeriae Stempffer, 1964
- Ornipholidotos annae Libert, 2005
- Ornipholidotos amieti Libert, 2005
- Ornipholidotos evoei Libert, 2005
- Ornipholidotos overlaeti fontainei Libert, 2005
- Ornipholidotos gemina Libert, 2000
- Ornipholidotos onitshae Stempffer, 1962
- Ornipholidotos congoensis Stempffer, 1964
- Ornipholidotos michelae Libert, 2000
- Ornipholidotos dargei Libert, 2000
- Ornipholidotos jacksoni occidentalis Libert, 2005
- Ornipholidotos goodgerae Libert, 2000
- Ornipholidotos sylpha (Kirby, 1890)
- Ornipholidotos nbeti Libert, 2005
- Ornipholidotos irwini Collins & Larsen, 1998
- Ornipholidotos henrii Libert, 2000
- Ornipholidotos tirza (Hewitson, 1873)
- Ornipholidotos paradoxa (Druce, 1910)
- Ornipholidotos perfragilis (Holland, 1890)
- Ornipholidotos sylphida (Staudinger, 1892)
- Ornipholidotos mathildae Libert, 2000
- Ornipholidotos ackeryi Libert, 2000
- Ornipholidotos kennedyi Libert, 2005
- Torbenia larseni (Stempffer, 1969)
- Torbenia aurivilliusi (Stempffer, 1967)
- Torbenia stempfferi stempfferi Collins & Larsen, 2000
- Torbenia stempfferi littoralis Collins & Larsen, 2000
- Torbenia stempfferi cuypersi Libert, 2005
- Torbenia persimilis Libert, 2000
- Cooksonia abri Collins & Larsen, 2008
- Mimacraea febe Libert, 2000
- Mimacraea charmian Grose-Smith & Kirby, 1889
- Mimacraea darwinia Butler, 1872
- Mimacraea apicalis Grose-Smith & Kirby, 1889
- Mimacraea krausei camerunica Libert, 2000
- Mimacraea landbecki Druce, 1910
- Mimacraea neavei Eltringham, 1909
- Mimacraea paragora Rebel, 1911
- Mimacraea telloides Schultze, 1923
- Mimeresia cellularis (Kirby, 1890)
- Mimeresia debora (Kirby, 1890)
- Mimeresia dinora (Kirby, 1890)
- Mimeresia drucei (Stempffer, 1954)
- Mimeresia favillacea (Grünberg, 1910)
- Mimeresia libentina (Hewitson, 1866)
- Mimeresia moreelsi tessmanni (Grünberg, 1910)
- Mimeresia russulus (Druce, 1910)
- Liptena albomacula Hawker-Smith, 1933
- Liptena amabilis Schultze, 1923
- Liptena augusta Suffert, 1904
- Liptena batesana Bethune-Baker, 1926
- Liptena boei Libert, 1993
- Liptena bolivari Kheil, 1905
- Liptena catalina (Grose-Smith & Kirby, 1887)
- Liptena confusa Aurivillius, 1899
- Liptena decempunctata Schultze, 1923
- Liptena decipiens decipiens (Kirby, 1890)
- Liptena decipiens leucostola (Holland, 1890)
- Liptena despecta (Holland, 1890)
- Liptena durbania Bethune-Baker, 1915
- Liptena eketi Bethune-Baker, 1926
- Liptena liberti Collins, Larsen & Rawlins, 2008
- Liptena eukrinaria Bethune-Baker, 1926
- Liptena lloydi Collins & Larsen, 2008
- Liptena evanescens (Kirby, 1887)
- Liptena fatima (Kirby, 1890)
- Liptena ferrymani (Grose-Smith & Kirby, 1891)
- Liptena flavicans flavicans (Grose-Smith & Kirby, 1891)
- Liptena flavicans oniens Talbot, 1935
- Liptena flavicans praeusta Schultze, 1917
- Liptena inframacula Hawker-Smith, 1933
- Liptena intermedia Grünberg, 1910
- Liptena modesta (Kirby, 1890)
- Liptena occidentalis Bethune-Baker, 1926
- Liptena ochrea Hawker-Smith, 1933
- Liptena opaca opaca (Kirby, 1890)
- Liptena opaca centralis Stempffer, Bennett & May, 1974
- Liptena orubrum (Holland, 1890)
- Liptena ouesso Stempffer, Bennett & May, 1974
- Liptena perobscura Druce, 1910
- Liptena praestans congoensis Schultze, 1923
- Liptena sauberi Schultze, 1912
- Liptena septistrigata (Bethune-Baker, 1903)
- Liptena similis (Kirby, 1890)
- Liptena subundularis (Staudinger, 1892)
- Liptena titei Stempffer, Bennett & May, 1974
- Liptena tricolora (Bethune-Baker, 1915)
- Liptena turbata (Kirby, 1890)
- Liptena undularis Hewitson, 1866
- Liptena xanthostola (Holland, 1890)
- Liptena yakadumae Schultze, 1917
- Obania subvariegata (Grose-Smith & Kirby, 1890)
- Obania tullia (Staudinger, 1892)
- Kakumia ferruginea (Schultze, 1923)
- Kakumia otlauga (Grose-Smith & Kirby, 1890)
- Tetrarhanis ilala etoumbi (Stempffer, 1964)
- Tetrarhanis laminifer Clench, 1965
- Tetrarhanis nubifera (Druce, 1910)
- Tetrarhanis ogojae (Stempffer, 1961)
- Tetrarhanis okwangwo Larsen, 1998
- Tetrarhanis schoutedeni (Berger, 1954)
- Tetrarhanis simplex (Aurivillius, 1895)
- Tetrarhanis stempfferi (Berger, 1954)
- Falcuna campimus campimus (Holland, 1890)
- Falcuna campimus dilatata (Schultze, 1923)
- Falcuna dorotheae Stempffer & Bennett, 1963
- Falcuna hollandi suffusa Stempffer & Bennett, 1963
- Falcuna libyssa libyssa (Hewitson, 1866)
- Falcuna libyssa cameroonica Stempffer & Bennett, 1963
- Falcuna lybia (Staudinger, 1892)
- Falcuna margarita (Suffert, 1904)
- Falcuna reducta Stempffer & Bennett, 1963
- Falcuna synesia fusca Stempffer & Bennett, 1963
- Larinopoda batesi Bethune-Baker, 1926
- Larinopoda lagyra (Hewitson, 1866)
- Larinopoda lircaea (Hewitson, 1866)
- Larinopoda tera (Hewitson, 1873)
- Micropentila adelgitha (Hewitson, 1874)
- Micropentila adelgunda (Staudinger, 1892)
- Micropentila bitjeana Stempffer & Bennett, 1965
- Micropentila brunnea (Kirby, 1887)
- Micropentila catocala Strand, 1914
- Micropentila cingulum Druce, 1910
- Micropentila dorothea Bethune-Baker, 1903
- Micropentila flavopunctata Stempffer & Bennett, 1965
- Micropentila fulvula Hawker-Smith, 1933
- Micropentila fuscula (Grose-Smith, 1898)
- Micropentila galenides (Holland, 1895)
- Micropentila subplagata Bethune-Baker, 1915
- Micropentila triangularis Aurivillius, 1895
- Micropentila ugandae Hawker-Smith, 1933
- Pseuderesia eleaza (Hewitson, 1873)
- Eresina conradti Stempffer, 1956
- Eresina corynetes (Grose-Smith & Kirby, 1890)
- Eresina fontainei Stempffer, 1956
- Eresina jacksoni Stempffer, 1961
- Eresina maesseni Stempffer, 1956
- Eresina pseudofusca Stempffer, 1961
- Eresina rougeoti Stempffer, 1956
- Eresiomera campbelli Collins & Larsen, 1998
- Eresiomera clenchi (Stempffer, 1961)
- Eresiomera isca (Hewitson, 1873)
- Eresiomera magnimacula (Rebel, 1914)
- Eresiomera nancy Collins & Larsen, 1998
- Eresiomera osheba (Holland, 1890)
- Eresiomera ouesso (Stempffer, 1962)
- Eresiomera paradoxa (Schultze, 1917)
- Eresiomera rougeoti (Stempffer, 1961)
- Eresiomera rutilo (Druce, 1910)
- Citrinophila bennetti Jackson, 1967
- Citrinophila erastus (Hewitson, 1866)
- Citrinophila similis (Kirby, 1887)
- Citrinophila tenera (Kirby, 1887)
- Citrinophila terias Joicey & Talbot, 1921
- Argyrocheila bitje Bethune-Baker, 1915
- Argyrocheila undifera Staudinger, 1892

==== Epitolini ====
- Toxochitona gerda (Kirby, 1890)
- Iridana exquisita (Grose-Smith, 1898)
- Iridana ghanana Stempffer, 1964
- Iridana hypocala Eltringham, 1929
- Iridana incredibilis (Staudinger, 1891)
- Iridana nigeriana Stempffer, 1964
- Iridana perdita (Kirby, 1890)
- Teratoneura isabellae Dudgeon, 1909
- Teratoneura congoensis Stempffer, 1954
- Epitola posthumus (Fabricius, 1793)
- Epitola urania Kirby, 1887
- Epitola uranioides uranoides Libert, 1999
- Cerautola adolphifriderici (Schultze, 1911)
- Cerautola ceraunia (Hewitson, 1873)
- Cerautola crowleyi leucographa Libert, 1999
- Cerautola miranda vidua (Talbot, 1935)
- Cerautola semibrunnea (Bethune-Baker, 1916)
- Cerautola hewitsoni (Mabille, 1877)
- Cerautola hewitsonioides (Hawker-Smith, 1933)
- Geritola albomaculata (Bethune-Baker, 1903)
- Geritola amieti Libert, 1999
- Geritola concepcion (Suffert, 1904)
- Geritola cyanea (Jackson, 1964)
- Geritola daveyi (Roche, 1954)
- Geritola dubia (Jackson, 1964)
- Geritola gerina (Hewitson, 1878)
- Geritola goodii (Holland, 1890)
- Geritola jackiana Collins & Libert, 1999
- Geritola larae Collins & Libert, 1999
- Geritola liana (Roche, 1954)
- Geritola mirifica (Jackson, 1964)
- Geritola nitide (Druce, 1910)
- Geritola nitidica Libert & Collins, 1999
- Geritola prouvosti Bouyer & Libert, 1999
- Geritola virginea (Bethune-Baker, 1904)
- Geritola zelica (Kirby, 1890)
- Geritola subargentea continua Libert, 1999
- Stempfferia abri Libert & Collins, 1997
- Stempfferia carcassoni Jackson, 1962
- Stempfferia alba (Jackson, 1962)
- Stempfferia annae Libert, 1999
- Stempfferia badura (Kirby, 1890)
- Stempfferia bouyeri Libert & Collins, 1999
- Stempfferia carcina (Hewitson, 1873)
- Stempfferia cercene (Hewitson, 1873)
- Stempfferia cercenoides (Holland, 1890)
- Stempfferia ciconia camerunica Libert, 1999
- Stempfferia cinerea (Berger, 1981)
- Stempfferia coerulea pierri Libert, 1999
- Stempfferia congoana (Aurivillius, 1923)
- Stempfferia elissa (Grose-Smith, 1898)
- Stempfferia flavoantennata (Roche, 1954)
- Stempfferia gordoni (Druce, 1903)
- Stempfferia insulana (Aurivillius, 1923)
- Stempfferia iturina (Joicey & Talbot, 1921)
- Stempfferia jolyana Libert & Bouyer, 1999
- Stempfferia liberti (Collins, 1998)
- Stempfferia marginata (Kirby, 1887)
- Stempfferia michelae centralis Libert, 1999
- Stempfferia piersoni Libert & Bouyer, 1999
- Stempfferia similis Libert, 1999
- Stempfferia tumentia (Druce, 1910)
- Stempfferia uniformis (Kirby, 1887)
- Stempfferia zelza (Hewitson, 1873)
- Cephetola catuna (Kirby, 1890)
- Cephetola cephena (Hewitson, 1873)
- Cephetola eliasis angustata Libert & Collins, 1999
- Cephetola ghesquierei (Roche, 1954)
- Cephetola katerae (Jackson, 1962)
- Cephetola marci Collins & Libert, 1999
- Cephetola mariae Libert, 1999
- Cephetola martini (Libert, 1998)
- Cephetola mercedes mercedes (Suffert, 1904)
- Cephetola mercedes dejeani Libert, 1999
- Cephetola nigeriae (Jackson, 1962)
- Cephetola nigra (Bethune-Baker, 1903)
- Cephetola orientalis (Roche, 1954)
- Cephetola ouesso (Jackson, 1962)
- Cephetola pinodes budduana (Talbot, 1937)
- Cephetola quentini Bouyer & Libert, 1999
- Cephetola rileyi (Audeoud, 1936)
- Cephetola subcoerulea (Roche, 1954)
- Cephetola subgriseata (Jackson, 1964)
- Cephetola sublustris (Bethune-Baker, 1904)
- Cephetola viridana (Joicey & Talbot, 1921)
- Batelusia zebra Druce, 1910
- Neaveia lamborni Druce, 1910
- Epitolina dispar (Kirby, 1887)
- Epitolina melissa (Druce, 1888)
- Epitolina collinsi Libert, 2000
- Epitolina catori Bethune-Baker, 1904
- Epitolina larseni Libert, 2000
- Hypophytala benitensis (Holland, 1890)
- Hypophytala henleyi (Kirby, 1890)
- Hypophytala hyetta (Hewitson, 1873)
- Hypophytala hyettoides (Aurivillius, 1895)
- Hypophytala reducta (Aurivillius, 1923)
- Hypophytala ultramarina Libert & Collins, 1999
- Phytala elais Westwood, 1851
- Neoepitola barombiensis (Kirby, 1890)
- Aethiopana honorius (Fabricius, 1793)
- Hewitsonia amieti Bouyer, 1997
- Hewitsonia bitjeana Bethune-Baker, 1915
- Hewitsonia beryllina Schultze, 1916
- Hewitsonia boisduvalii boisduvalii (Hewitson, 1869)
- Hewitsonia boisduvalii borealis Schultze, 1916
- Hewitsonia congoensis Joicey & Talbot, 1921
- Hewitsonia danane Stempffer, 1969
- Hewitsonia inexpectata Bouyer, 1997
- Hewitsonia kirbyi Dewitz, 1879
- Hewitsonia prouvosti Bouyer, 1997
- Hewitsonia ugandae jolyana Bouyer, 1997
- Powellana cottoni Bethune-Baker, 1908

=== Aphnaeinae ===
- Pseudaletis agrippina Druce, 1888
- Pseudaletis camarensis Collins & Libert, 2007
- Pseudaletis abriana Libert, 2007
- Pseudaletis bouyeri Collins & Libert, 2007
- Pseudaletis michelae Libert, 2007
- Pseudaletis melissae Collins & Libert, 2007
- Pseudaletis clymenus (Druce, 1885)
- Pseudaletis zebra Holland, 1891
- Pseudaletis taeniata Libert, 2007
- Pseudaletis busoga van Someren, 1939
- Pseudaletis antimachus (Staudinger, 1888)
- Pseudaletis batesi Druce, 1910
- Pseudaletis richardi Stempffer, 1952
- Pseudaletis dolieri Collins & Libert, 2007
- Pseudaletis arrhon Druce, 1913
- Lipaphnaeus aderna (Plötz, 1880)
- Lipaphnaeus leonina bitje (Druce, 1910)
- Lipaphnaeus leonina paradoxa (Schultze, 1908)
- Cigaritis avriko (Karsch, 1893)
- Cigaritis crustaria (Holland, 1890)
- Cigaritis dufranei (Bouyer, 1991)
- Cigaritis homeyeri (Dewitz, 1887)
- Cigaritis menelas (Druce, 1907)
- Cigaritis nilus (Hewitson, 1865)
- Zeritis aurivillii Schultze, 1908
- Zeritis neriene Boisduval, 1836
- Axiocerses harpax efulena Clench, 1963
- Axiocerses callaghani Henning & Henning, 1996
- Axiocerses amanga borealis Aurivillius, 1905
- Aphnaeus adamsi Stempffer, 1954
- Aphnaeus argyrocyclus Holland, 1890
- Aphnaeus asterius Plötz, 1880
- Aphnaeus chapini occidentalis Clench, 1963
- Aphnaeus charboneli Bouyer & Libert, 1996
- Aphnaeus gilloni Stempffer, 1966
- Aphnaeus herbuloti Stempffer, 1971
- Aphnaeus jefferyi Hawker-Smith, 1928
- Aphnaeus marci Collins & Larsen, 2008
- Aphnaeus liberti Bouyer, 1996
- Aphnaeus orcas (Drury, 1782)

=== Theclinae ===
- Myrina silenus (Fabricius, 1775)
- Myrina subornata Lathy, 1903
- Oxylides albata (Aurivillius, 1895)
- Oxylides faunus camerunica Libert, 2004
- Syrmoptera amasa (Hewitson, 1869)
- Syrmoptera bonifacei Stempffer, 1961
- Syrmoptera melanomitra Karsch, 1895
- Dapidodigma demeter Clench, 1961
- Dapidodigma hymen (Fabricius, 1775)
- Hypolycaena antifaunus (Westwood, 1851)
- Hypolycaena clenchi Larsen, 1997
- Hypolycaena coerulea Aurivillius, 1895
- Hypolycaena dubia Aurivillius, 1895
- Hypolycaena hatita Hewitson, 1865
- Hypolycaena kadiskos Druce, 1890
- Hypolycaena kakumi Larsen, 1997
- Hypolycaena lebona (Hewitson, 1865)
- Hypolycaena liara Druce, 1890
- Hypolycaena naara Hewitson, 1873
- Hypolycaena nigra Bethune-Baker, 1914
- Hypolycaena scintillans Stempffer, 1957
- Iolaus bolissus azureus Clench, 1964
- Iolaus eurisus vexillarius Clench, 1964
- Iolaus aethes Clench, 1964
- Iolaus aethria Karsch, 1893
- Iolaus agnes Aurivillius, 1898
- Iolaus alienus bicaudatus Aurivillius, 1905
- Iolaus aurivillii Röber, 1900
- Iolaus bansana Bethune-Baker, 1926
- Iolaus bellina bellina (Plötz, 1880)
- Iolaus bellina exquisita (Riley, 1928)
- Iolaus coelestis Bethune-Baker, 1926
- Iolaus creta Hewitson, 1878
- Iolaus cytaeis Hewitson, 1875
- Iolaus farquharsoni (Bethune-Baker, 1922)
- Iolaus flavilinea (Riley, 1928)
- Iolaus adorabilis Collins & Larsen, 2008
- Iolaus fontainei (Stempffer, 1956)
- Iolaus frater kamerunica (Riley, 1928)
- Iolaus gemmarius (Druce, 1910)
- Iolaus hemicyanus barbara Suffert, 1904
- Iolaus iasis Hewitson, 1865
- Iolaus maesa (Hewitson, 1862)
- Iolaus neavei (Druce, 1910)
- Iolaus pollux Aurivillius, 1895
- Iolaus sappirus (Druce, 1902)
- Iolaus scintillans Aurivillius, 1905
- Iolaus sciophilus (Schultze, 1916)
- Iolaus sibella (Druce, 1910)
- Iolaus menas Druce, 1890
- Iolaus schultzei Aurivillius, 1905
- Iolaus gabunica gabunica (Riley, 1928)
- Iolaus gabunica mbami (Libert, 1993)
- Iolaus icipe Collins & Larsen, 1998
- Iolaus iulus Hewitson, 1869
- Iolaus ismenias (Klug, 1834)
- Iolaus christofferi Collins & Larsen, 2003
- Iolaus alcibiades Kirby, 1871
- Iolaus paneperata Druce, 1890
- Iolaus lukabas Druce, 1890
- Iolaus calisto (Westwood, 1851)
- Iolaus laonides Aurivillius, 1898
- Iolaus poecilaon (Riley, 1928)
- Iolaus caesareus Aurivillius, 1895
- Iolaus manasei (Libert, 1993)
- Iolaus timon (Fabricius, 1787)
- Iolaus catori Bethune-Baker, 1904
- Pilodeudorix mimeta mimeta (Karsch, 1895)
- Pilodeudorix mimeta oreas Libert, 2004
- Pilodeudorix ula (Karsch, 1895)
- Pilodeudorix virgata (Druce, 1891)
- Pilodeudorix anetia (Hulstaert, 1924)
- Pilodeudorix hamidou Libert, 2004
- Pilodeudorix angelita angelita (Suffert, 1904)
- Pilodeudorix angelita schultzei (Aurivillius, 1907)
- Pilodeudorix aruma (Hewitson, 1873)
- Pilodeudorix catori (Bethune-Baker, 1903)
- Pilodeudorix kallipygos (Birket-Smith, 1960)
- Pilodeudorix leonina dimitris (d'Abrera, 1980)
- Pilodeudorix leonina indentata Libert, 2004
- Pilodeudorix mera (Hewitson, 1873)
- Pilodeudorix otraeda genuba (Hewitson, 1875)
- Pilodeudorix camerona (Plötz, 1880)
- Pilodeudorix congoana (Aurivillius, 1923)
- Pilodeudorix diyllus (Hewitson, 1878)
- Pilodeudorix zela (Hewitson, 1869)
- Pilodeudorix aucta (Karsch, 1895)
- Pilodeudorix hugoi Libert, 2004
- Pilodeudorix catalla (Karsch, 1895)
- Pilodeudorix corruscans (Aurivillius, 1898)
- Pilodeudorix deritas (Hewitson, 1874)
- Pilodeudorix kedassa (Druce, 1910)
- Pilodeudorix kiellandi (Congdon & Collins, 1998)
- Pilodeudorix laticlavia (Clench, 1965)
- Pilodeudorix nirmo (Clench, 1965)
- Pilodeudorix pasteon (Druce, 1910)
- Pilodeudorix pseudoderitas (Stempffer, 1964)
- Pilodeudorix sadeska (Clench, 1965)
- Pilodeudorix violetta (Aurivillius, 1897)
- Paradeudorix cobaltina (Stempffer, 1964)
- Paradeudorix eleala (Hewitson, 1865)
- Paradeudorix ituri (Bethune-Baker, 1908)
- Paradeudorix marginata (Stempffer, 1962)
- Paradeudorix petersi (Stempffer & Bennett, 1956)
- Hypomyrina mimetica Libert, 2004
- Hypomyrina fournierae Gabriel, 1939
- Deudorix caliginosa Lathy, 1903
- Deudorix dinochares Grose-Smith, 1887
- Deudorix dinomenes diomedes Jackson, 1966
- Deudorix galathea (Swainson, 1821)
- Deudorix kayonza Stempffer, 1956
- Deudorix livia (Klug, 1834)
- Deudorix lorisona (Hewitson, 1862)
- Deudorix odana Druce, 1887
- Capys bamendanus Schultze, 1909

=== Polyommatinae ===
==== Lycaenesthini ====
- Anthene abruptus (Gaede, 1915)
- Anthene afra (Bethune-Baker, 1910)
- Anthene buchholzi (Plötz, 1880)
- Anthene crawshayi (Butler, 1899)
- Anthene definita (Butler, 1899)
- Anthene emkopoti Larsen & Collins, 1998
- Anthene flavomaculatus (Grose-Smith & Kirby, 1893)
- Anthene irumu (Stempffer, 1948)
- Anthene juba (Fabricius, 1787)
- Anthene kampala (Bethune-Baker, 1910)
- Anthene lachares (Hewitson, 1878)
- Anthene larydas (Cramer, 1780)
- Anthene leptines (Hewitson, 1874)
- Anthene ligures (Hewitson, 1874)
- Anthene liodes (Hewitson, 1874)
- Anthene locuples (Grose-Smith, 1898)
- Anthene lunulata (Trimen, 1894)
- Anthene lychnides (Hewitson, 1878)
- Anthene lysicles (Hewitson, 1874)
- Anthene mahota (Grose-Smith, 1887)
- Anthene makala (Bethune-Baker, 1910)
- Anthene ngoko Stempffer, 1962
- Anthene princeps (Butler, 1876)
- Anthene pyroptera (Aurivillius, 1895)
- Anthene ramnika d'Abrera, 1980
- Anthene rubricinctus (Holland, 1891)
- Anthene scintillula (Holland, 1891)
- Anthene starki Larsen, 2005
- Anthene sylvanus (Drury, 1773)
- Anthene versatilis versatilis (Bethune-Baker, 1910)
- Anthene versatilis bitje (Druce, 1910)
- Anthene wilsoni (Talbot, 1935)
- Anthene zenkeri (Karsch, 1895)
- Anthene lamprocles (Hewitson, 1878)
- Anthene lyzanius (Hewitson, 1874)
- Anthene quadricaudata (Bethune-Baker, 1926)
- Anthene chryseostictus (Bethune-Baker, 1910)
- Anthene fulvus Stempffer, 1962
- Anthene gemmifera (Neave, 1910)
- Anthene lusones (Hewitson, 1874)
- Anthene staudingeri (Grose-Smith & Kirby, 1894)
- Anthene africana (Bethune-Baker, 1926)
- Anthene coerulea (Aurivillius, 1895)
- Anthene fasciatus (Aurivillius, 1895)
- Anthene hades (Bethune-Baker, 1910)
- Anthene inconspicua (Druce, 1910)
- Anthene inferna (Bethune-Baker, 1926)
- Anthene lacides (Hewitson, 1874)
- Anthene lamias (Hewitson, 1878)
- Anthene lucretilis (Hewitson, 1874)
- Anthene obscura (Druce, 1910)
- Anthene phoenicis (Karsch, 1893)
- Anthene rufoplagata (Bethune-Baker, 1910)
- Cupidesthes arescopa Bethune-Baker, 1910
- Cupidesthes caerulea Jackson, 1966
- Cupidesthes leonina (Bethune-Baker, 1903)
- Cupidesthes lithas (Druce, 1890)
- Cupidesthes mimetica (Druce, 1910)
- Cupidesthes paralithas Bethune-Baker, 1926
- Cupidesthes pungusei Collins & Larsen, 2005
- Cupidesthes robusta Aurivillius, 1895

==== Polyommatini ====
- Cupidopsis jobates mauritanica Riley, 1932
- Pseudonacaduba aethiops (Mabille, 1877)
- Pseudonacaduba sichela (Wallengren, 1857)
- Lampides boeticus (Linnaeus, 1767)
- Uranothauma antinorii bamendanus Libert, 1993
- Uranothauma falkensteini (Dewitz, 1879)
- Uranothauma frederikkae frederikkae Libert, 1993
- Uranothauma frederikkae manengoubensis Libert, 1993
- Uranothauma heritsia (Hewitson, 1876)
- Uranothauma nubifer (Trimen, 1895)
- Phlyaria cyara (Hewitson, 1876)
- Cacyreus audeoudi Stempffer, 1936
- Cacyreus lingeus (Stoll, 1782)
- Leptotes pirithous (Linnaeus, 1767)
- Tuxentius carana (Hewitson, 1876)
- Tuxentius cretosus nodieri (Oberthür, 1883)
- Tuxentius margaritaceus (Sharpe, 1892)
- Tarucus legrasi Stempffer, 1948
- Tarucus rosacea (Austaut, 1885)
- Tarucus theophrastus (Fabricius, 1793)
- Tarucus ungemachi Stempffer, 1942
- Zizeeria knysna (Trimen, 1862)
- Actizera lucida (Trimen, 1883)
- Zizula hylax (Fabricius, 1775)
- Azanus mirza (Plötz, 1880)
- Azanus isis (Drury, 1773)
- Eicochrysops dudgeoni Riley, 1929
- Eicochrysops hippocrates (Fabricius, 1793)
- Eicochrysops sanyere Libert, 1993
- Euchrysops albistriata (Capronnier, 1889)
- Euchrysops banyo Libert, 2001
- Euchrysops barkeri (Trimen, 1893)
- Euchrysops cyclopteris (Butler, 1876)
- Euchrysops malathana (Boisduval, 1833)
- Euchrysops nilotica (Aurivillius, 1904)
- Euchrysops reducta Hulstaert, 1924
- Euchrysops sagba Libert, 1993
- Thermoniphas alberici (Dufrane, 1945)
- Thermoniphas bibundana (Grünberg, 1910)
- Thermoniphas fumosa Stempffer, 1952
- Thermoniphas leucocyanea Clench, 1961
- Thermoniphas micylus (Cramer, 1780)
- Thermoniphas stempfferi Clench, 1961
- Thermoniphas togara (Plötz, 1880)
- Oboronia albicosta (Gaede, 1916)
- Oboronia guessfeldti (Dewitz, 1879)
- Oboronia ornata ornata (Mabille, 1890)
- Oboronia ornata vestalis (Aurivillius, 1895)
- Oboronia pseudopunctatus (Strand, 1912)
- Oboronia punctatus (Dewitz, 1879)
- Chilades eleusis (Demaison, 1888)
- Lepidochrysops abri Libert & Collins, 2001
- Lepidochrysops parsimon (Fabricius, 1775)
- Lepidochrysops phoebe Libert, 2001
- Lepidochrysops polydialecta (Bethune-Baker, [1923])
- Lepidochrysops quassi bernaudi Libert & Collins, 2001
- Lepidochrysops ringa Tite, 1959
- Lepidochrysops victoriae occidentalis Libert & Collins, 2001

== Riodinidae ==
=== Nemeobiinae ===
- Abisara tantalus caerulea Carpenter & Jackson, 1950
- Abisara intermedia Aurivillius, 1895
- Abisara talantus Aurivillius, 1891
- Abisara caeca semicaeca Riley, 1932
- Abisara rutherfordii rutherfordii Hewitson, 1874
- Abisara rutherfordii herwigii Dewitz, 1887
- Abisara gerontes gerontes (Fabricius, 1781)
- Abisara gerontes gabunica Riley, 1932
- Abisara rogersi Druce, 1878
- Abisara cameroonensis Callaghan, 2003
- Abisara neavei latifasciata Riley, 1932

== Nymphalidae ==
=== Libytheinae ===
- Libythea labdaca Westwood, 1851

=== Danainae ===
==== Danaini ====
- Danaus chrysippus alcippus (Cramer, 1777)
- Tirumala formosa morgeni (Honrath, 1892)
- Tirumala petiverana (Doubleday, 1847)
- Amauris niavius (Linnaeus, 1758)
- Amauris tartarea Mabille, 1876
- Amauris albimaculata intermedians Hulstaert, 1926
- Amauris crawshayi camerunica Joicey & Talbot, 1925
- Amauris damocles (Fabricius, 1793)
- Amauris echeria occidentalis Schmidt, 1921
- Amauris hecate (Butler, 1866)
- Amauris hyalites Butler, 1874
- Amauris inferna Butler, 1871
- Amauris vashti (Butler, 1869)

=== Satyrinae ===
==== Elymniini ====
- Elymniopsis bammakoo (Westwood, [1851])

==== Melanitini ====
- Gnophodes betsimena parmeno Doubleday, 1849
- Gnophodes chelys (Fabricius, 1793)
- Melanitis ansorgei Rothschild, 1904
- Melanitis leda (Linnaeus, 1758)
- Aphysoneura scapulifascia occidentalis Joicey & Talbot, 1924

==== Satyrini ====
- Bicyclus amieti Libert, 1996
- Bicyclus analis (Aurivillius, 1895)
- Bicyclus angulosa (Butler, 1868)
- Bicyclus anisops (Karsch, 1892)
- Bicyclus auricruda fulgidus Fox, 1963
- Bicyclus buea (Strand, 1912)
- Bicyclus campus (Karsch, 1893)
- Bicyclus dorothea (Cramer, 1779)
- Bicyclus dubia (Aurivillius, 1893)
- Bicyclus ephorus bergeri Condamin, 1965
- Bicyclus evadne elionias (Hewitson, 1866)
- Bicyclus ewondo Libert, 1996
- Bicyclus golo (Aurivillius, 1893)
- Bicyclus graueri choveti Libert, 1996
- Bicyclus hewitsoni (Doumet, 1861)
- Bicyclus howarthi Condamin, 1963
- Bicyclus hyperanthus (Bethune-Baker, 1908)
- Bicyclus iccius (Hewitson, 1865)
- Bicyclus ignobilis eurini Condamin & Fox, 1963
- Bicyclus istaris (Plötz, 1880)
- Bicyclus italus (Hewitson, 1865)
- Bicyclus madetes madetes (Hewitson, 1874)
- Bicyclus madetes carola d'Abrera, 1980
- Bicyclus mandanes Hewitson, 1873
- Bicyclus medontias (Hewitson, 1873)
- Bicyclus mesogena (Karsch, 1894)
- Bicyclus mollitia (Karsch, 1895)
- Bicyclus nachtetis Condamin, 1965
- Bicyclus nobilis (Aurivillius, 1893)
- Bicyclus pavonis (Butler, 1876)
- Bicyclus procora (Karsch, 1893)
- Bicyclus rhacotis (Hewitson, 1866)
- Bicyclus rileyi Condamin, 1961
- Bicyclus safitza (Westwood, 1850)
- Bicyclus sambulos (Hewitson, 1877)
- Bicyclus martius sanaos (Hewitson, 1866)
- Bicyclus sandace (Hewitson, 1877)
- Bicyclus sangmelinae Condamin, 1963
- Bicyclus saussurei camerunia (Strand, 1914)
- Bicyclus sciathis (Hewitson, 1866)
- Bicyclus sebetus (Hewitson, 1877)
- Bicyclus smithi (Aurivillius, 1899)
- Bicyclus sophrosyne (Plötz, 1880)
- Bicyclus sweadneri Fox, 1963
- Bicyclus sylvicolus Condamin, 1965
- Bicyclus taenias (Hewitson, 1877)
- Bicyclus technatis (Hewitson, 1877)
- Bicyclus trilophus trilophus (Rebel, 1914)
- Bicyclus trilophus jacksoni Condamin, 1961
- Bicyclus vulgaris (Butler, 1868)
- Bicyclus xeneas (Hewitson, 1866)
- Bicyclus xeneoides Condamin, 1961
- Hallelesis asochis asochis (Hewitson, 1866)
- Hallelesis asochis congoensis (Joicey & Talbot, 1921)
- Heteropsis perspicua camerounica (Kielland, 1994)
- Heteropsis peitho (Plötz, 1880)
- Heteropsis nigrescens striata (Libert, 2006)
- Ypthima albida occidentalis Bartel, 1905
- Ypthima condamini nigeriae Kielland, 1982
- Ypthima doleta Kirby, 1880
- Ypthima impura Elwes & Edwards, 1893
- Ypthima lamto Kielland, 1982
- Ypthima pupillaris Butler, 1888
- Ypthima vuattouxi Kielland, 1982

=== Charaxinae ===
==== Charaxini ====
- Charaxes varanes vologeses (Mabille, 1876)
- Charaxes fulvescens (Aurivillius, 1891)
- Charaxes obudoensis van Someren, 1969
- Charaxes candiope (Godart, 1824)
- Charaxes protoclea protonothodes van Someren, 1971
- Charaxes boueti Feisthamel, 1850
- Charaxes cynthia kinduana Le Cerf, 1923
- Charaxes lucretius intermedius van Someren, 1971
- Charaxes lactetinctus Karsch, 1892
- Charaxes jasius Poulton, 1926
- Charaxes epijasius Reiche, 1850
- Charaxes castor (Cramer, 1775)
- Charaxes brutus angustus Rothschild, 1900
- Charaxes pollux (Cramer, 1775)
- Charaxes tectonis tectonis Jordan, 1937
- Charaxes tectonis nebularum Darge, 1977
- Charaxes eudoxus mechowi Rothschild, 1900
- Charaxes musakensis Darge, 1973
- Charaxes richelmanni Röber, 1936
- Charaxes numenes aequatorialis van Someren, 1972
- Charaxes tiridates tiridatinus Röber, 1936
- Charaxes bipunctatus ugandensis van Someren, 1972
- Charaxes mixtus Rothschild, 1894
- Charaxes smaragdalis Butler, 1866
- Charaxes xiphares wernickei Joicey & Talbot, 1927
- Charaxes imperialis albipuncta Joicey & Talbot, 1920
- Charaxes ameliae Doumet, 1861
- Charaxes pythodoris occidens van Someren, 1963
- Charaxes hadrianus Ward, 1871
- Charaxes lecerfi Lathy, 192
- Charaxes nobilis Druce, 1873
- Charaxes superbus Schultze, 1909
- Charaxes lydiae Holland, 1917
- Charaxes acraeoides Druce, 1908
- Charaxes fournierae Le Moult, 1930
- Charaxes zingha (Stoll, 1780)
- Charaxes etesipe (Godart, 1824)
- Charaxes achaemenes monticola van Someren, 1970
- Charaxes eupale latimargo Joicey & Talbot, 1921
- Charaxes subornatus Schultze, 1916
- Charaxes anticlea proadusta van Someren, 1971
- Charaxes thysi Capronnier, 1889
- Charaxes taverniersi Berger, 1975
- Charaxes hildebrandti (Dewitz, 1879)
- Charaxes virilis van Someren & Jackson, 1952
- Charaxes catachrous van Someren & Jackson, 1952
- Charaxes etheocles ochracea van Someren & Jackson, 1957
- Charaxes cedreatis Hewitson, 1874
- Charaxes viola viola Butler, 1866
- Charaxes viola picta van Someren & Jackson, 1952
- Charaxes kheili Staudinger, 1896
- Charaxes pleione congoensis Plantrou, 1989
- Charaxes paphianus paphianus Ward, 1871
- Charaxes paphianus falcata (Butler, 1872)
- Charaxes kahldeni Homeyer & Dewitz, 1882
- Charaxes nichetes nichetes Grose-Smith, 1883
- Charaxes nichetes leopardinus Plantrou, 1974
- Charaxes lycurgus bernardiana Plantrou, 1978
- Charaxes zelica rougeoti Plantrou, 1978
- Charaxes porthos Grose-Smith, 1883
- Charaxes doubledayi Aurivillius, 1899
- Charaxes mycerina nausicaa Staudinger, 1891
- Charaxes dubiosus Röber, 1936

==== Euxanthini ====
- Charaxes eurinome eurinome (Cramer, 1775)
- Charaxes eurinome ansellica (Butler, 1870)
- Charaxes crossleyi (Ward, 1871)
- Charaxes trajanus (Ward, 1871)

==== Pallini ====
- Palla publius centralis van Someren, 1975
- Palla ussheri dobelli (Hall, 1919)
- Palla decius (Cramer, 1777)
- Palla violinitens coniger (Butler, 1896)

=== Apaturinae ===
- Apaturopsis cleochares (Hewitson, 1873)

=== Nymphalinae ===
- Kallimoides rumia jadyae (Fox, 1968)
- Vanessula milca buechneri Dewitz, 1887

==== Nymphalini ====
- Antanartia delius (Drury, 1782)
- Vanessa dimorphica mortoni (Howarth, 1966)
- Junonia africana (Richelmann, 1913)
- Junonia oenone (Linnaeus, 1758)
- Junonia schmiedeli (Fiedler, 1920)
- Junonia sophia (Fabricius, 1793)
- Junonia stygia (Aurivillius, 1894)
- Junonia gregorii Butler, 1896
- Junonia terea (Drury, 1773)
- Junonia westermanni Westwood, 1870
- Junonia ansorgei (Rothschild, 1899)
- Junonia cymodoce lugens (Schultze, 1912)
- Salamis cacta (Fabricius, 1793)
- Protogoniomorpha parhassus (Drury, 1782)
- Protogoniomorpha temora (Felder & Felder, 1867)
- Precis ceryne ceruana Rothschild & Jordan, 190
- Precis coelestina Dewitz, 1879
- Precis milonia Felder & Felder, 1867
- Precis octavia (Cramer, 1777)
- Precis rauana silvicola Schultz, 1916
- Precis sinuata Plötz, 1880
- Hypolimnas anthedon (Doubleday, 1845)
- Hypolimnas bartelotti Grose-Smith, 1890
- Hypolimnas chapmani (Hewitson, 1873)
- Hypolimnas dinarcha (Hewitson, 1865)
- Hypolimnas mechowi (Dewitz, 1884)
- Hypolimnas misippus (Linnaeus, 1764)
- Hypolimnas monteironis (Druce, 1874)
- Hypolimnas salmacis (Drury, 1773)
- Catacroptera cloanthe ligata Rothschild & Jordan, 1903

=== Cyrestinae ===
==== Cyrestini ====
- Cyrestis camillus (Fabricius, 1781)

=== Biblidinae ===
==== Biblidini ====
- Byblia anvatara crameri Aurivillius, 1894
- Mesoxantha ethosea ethoseoides Rebel, 1914
- Ariadne actisanes (Hewitson, 1875)
- Ariadne albifascia (Joicey & Talbot, 1921)
- Ariadne enotrea enotrea (Cramer, 1779)
- Ariadne enotrea suffusa (Joicey & Talbot, 1921)
- Ariadne pagenstecheri (Suffert, 1904)
- Ariadne personata (Joicey & Talbot, 1921)
- Neptidopsis ophione (Cramer, 1777)
- Eurytela alinda Mabille, 1893
- Eurytela dryope (Cramer, [1775])
- Eurytela hiarbas (Drury, 1782)

==== Epicaliini ====
- Sevenia amulia (Cramer, 1777)
- Sevenia boisduvali omissa (Rothschild, 1918)
- Sevenia garega (Karsch, 1892)
- Sevenia occidentalium (Mabille, 1876)
- Sevenia pechueli sangbae (Hecq & Peeters, 1992)
- Sevenia silvicola (Schultze, 1917)
- Sevenia trimeni major (Rothschild, 1918)
- Sevenia umbrina (Karsch, 1892)

=== Limenitinae ===
==== Limenitidini ====
- Harma theobene superna (Fox, 1968)
- Cymothoe alticola Libert & Collins, 1997
- Cymothoe altisidora (Hewitson, 1869)
- Cymothoe amenides (Hewitson, 1874)
- Cymothoe anitorgis (Hewitson, 1874)
- Cymothoe aramis (Hewitson, 1865)
- Cymothoe beckeri (Herrich-Schaeffer, 1858)
- Cymothoe caenis (Drury, 1773)
- Cymothoe capella (Ward, 1871)
- Cymothoe coccinata (Hewitson, 1874)
- Cymothoe consanguis Aurivillius, 1896
- Cymothoe crocea Schultze, 1917
- Cymothoe cyclades (Ward, 1871)
- Cymothoe distincta Overlaet, 1944
- Cymothoe confusa Aurivillius, 1887
- Cymothoe megaesta Staudinger, 1890
- Cymothoe euthalioides Kirby, 1889
- Cymothoe excelsa Neustetter, 1912
- Cymothoe fontainei debauchei Overlaet, 1952
- Cymothoe fumana balluca Fox & Howarth, 1968
- Cymothoe haimodia (Grose-Smith, 1887)
- Cymothoe harmilla kraepelini Schultze, 1912
- Cymothoe haynae diphyia Karsch, 1894
- Cymothoe haynae superba Aurivillius, 1899
- Cymothoe heliada (Hewitson, 1874)
- Cymothoe herminia (Grose-Smith, 1887)
- Cymothoe hesiodina Schultze, 1908
- Cymothoe hesiodotus Staudinger, 1890
- Cymothoe hyarbita (Hewitson, 1866)
- Cymothoe indamora (Hewitson, 1866)
- Cymothoe jodutta ciceronis (Ward, 1871)
- Cymothoe lucasii binotorum Darge, 1985
- Cymothoe lurida hesione Weymer, 1907
- Cymothoe oemilius (Doumet, 1859)
- Cymothoe ogova (Plötz, 1880)
- Cymothoe orphnina suavis Schultze, 1913
- Cymothoe preussi Staudinger, 1890
- Cymothoe radialis Gaede, 1916
- Cymothoe rebeli Neustetter, 1912
- Cymothoe reginaeelisabethae belgarum Overlaet, 1952
- Cymothoe reinholdi (Plötz, 1880)
- Cymothoe sangaris (Godart, 1824)
- Cymothoe weymeri Suffert, 1904
- Cymothoe zenkeri Richelmann, 1913
- Pseudoneptis bugandensis ianthe Hemming, 1964
- Pseudacraea annakae Knoop, 1988
- Pseudacraea boisduvalii (Doubleday, 1845)
- Pseudacraea clarkii Butler & Rothschild, 1892
- Pseudacraea dolomena (Hewitson, 1865)
- Pseudacraea rubrobasalis Aurivillius, 1903
- Pseudacraea eurytus (Linnaeus, 1758)
- Pseudacraea kuenowii gottbergi Dewitz, 1884
- Pseudacraea lucretia lucretia (Cramer, [1775])
- Pseudacraea lucretia protracta (Butler, 1874)
- Pseudacraea semire (Cramer, 1779)
- Pseudacraea warburgi Aurivillius, 1892

==== Neptidini ====
- Neptis agouale Pierre-Baltus, 1978
- Neptis alta Overlaet, 1955
- Neptis biafra Ward, 1871
- Neptis camarensis Schultze, 1920
- Neptis claude Collins & Larsen, 2005
- Neptis conspicua Neave, 1904
- Neptis constantiae kaumba Condamin, 1966
- Neptis continuata Holland, 1892
- Neptis dentifera Schultze, 1920
- Neptis exaleuca Karsch, 1894
- Neptis infusa Birket-Smith, 1960
- Neptis jamesoni Godman & Salvin, 1890
- Neptis kiriakoffi Overlaet, 1955
- Neptis liberti Pierre & Pierre-Baltus, 1998
- Neptis matilei Pierre-Balthus, 20
- Neptis melicerta (Drury, 1773)
- Neptis metanira Holland, 1892
- Neptis mixophyes Holland, 1892
- Neptis morosa Overlaet, 1955
- Neptis nebrodes Hewitson, 1874
- Neptis nemetes nemetes Hewitson, 1868
- Neptis nemetes margueriteae Fox, 1968
- Neptis nicobule Holland, 1892
- Neptis nicomedes Hewitson, 1874
- Neptis quintilla Mabille, 1890
- Neptis nicoteles Hewitson, 1874
- Neptis nysiades Hewitson, 1868
- Neptis strigata Pierre-Baltus, 2007
- Neptis occidentalis batesii Hall, 1930
- Neptis ochracea mildbraedi Gaede, 1915
- Neptis puella Aurivillius, 1894
- Neptis saclava marpessa Hopffer, 1855
- Neptis seeldrayersi Aurivillius, 1895
- Neptis serena Overlaet, 1955
- Neptis strigata Aurivillius, 1894
- Neptis trigonophora melicertula Strand, 1912
- Neptis troundi Pierre-Baltus, 1978

==== Adoliadini ====
- Catuna angustatum (Felder & Felder, 1867)
- Catuna crithea (Drury, 1773)
- Catuna niji Fox, 1965
- Catuna oberthueri Karsch, 1894
- Euryphura athymoides Berger, 1981
- Euryphura chalcis (Felder & Felder, 1860)
- Euryphura isuka Stoneham, 1935
- Euryphura plautilla (Hewitson, 1865)
- Euryphura porphyrion (Ward, 1871)
- Euryphura togoensis Suffert, 1904
- Euryphaedra thauma Staudinger, 1891
- Harmilla elegans Aurivillius, 1892
- Pseudargynnis hegemone (Godart, 1819)
- Aterica galene galene (Brown, 1776)
- Aterica galene extensa Heron, 1909
- Cynandra opis opis (Drury, 1773)
- Cynandra opis bernardii Lagnel, 1967
- Euriphene amieti Collins & Larsen, 1997
- Euriphene anaxibia Hecq, 1997
- Euriphene hecqui Collins & Larsen, 1997
- Euriphene abasa (Hewitson, 1866)
- Euriphene amaranta (Karsch, 1894)
- Euriphene amicia (Hewitson, 1871)
- Euriphene aridatha aridatha (Hewitson, 1866)
- Euriphene aridatha camerunica d'Abrera, 2004
- Euriphene atossa (Hewitson, 1865)
- Euriphene atropurpurea (Aurivillius, 1894)
- Euriphene atrovirens (Mabille, 1878)
- Euriphene aurivillii (Bartel, 1905)
- Euriphene barombina (Aurivillius, 1894)
- Euriphene batesana Bethune-Baker, 1926
- Euriphene camarensis (Ward, 1871)
- Euriphene conjungens (Aurivillius, 1909)
- Euriphene duseni duseni (Aurivillius, 1892)
- Euriphene duseni legeriana Hecq, 1987
- Euriphene ernestibaumanni (Karsch, 1895)
- Euriphene gambiae gabonica Bernardi, 1966
- Euriphene glaucopis (Gaede, 1916)
- Euriphene goniogramma (Karsch, 1894)
- Euriphene grosesmithi (Staudinger, 1891)
- Euriphene incerta (Aurivillius, 1912)
- Euriphene karschi (Aurivillius, 1894)
- Euriphene luteostriata (Bethune-Baker, 1908)
- Euriphene milnei (Hewitson, 1865)
- Euriphene minkoi collinsi Hecq, 1994
- Euriphene mundula (Grünberg, 1910)
- Euriphene niepelti Neustetter, 1916
- Euriphene obani Wojtusiak & Knoop, 1994
- Euriphene obsoleta (Grünberg, 1908)
- Euriphene obtusangula (Aurivillius, 1912)
- Euriphene pavo (Howarth, 1959)
- Euriphene plagiata (Aurivillius, 1897)
- Euriphene rectangula (Schultze, 1920)
- Euriphene regula Hecq, 1994
- Euriphene schultzei (Aurivillius, 1909)
- Euriphene bernaudi Hecq, 1994
- Euriphene tadema (Hewitson, 1866)
- Euriphene tessmanniana (Bryk, 1915)
- Euriphene doriclea (Drury, 1782)
- Euriphene lysandra (Stoll, 1790)
- Euriphene paralysandra d'Abrera, 2004
- Bebearia subtentyris subtentyris (Strand, 1912)
- Bebearia subtentyris phoebeensis Hecq, 1996
- Bebearia languida (Schultze, 1920)
- Bebearia tentyris (Hewitson, 1866)
- Bebearia carshena (Hewitson, 1871)
- Bebearia absolon (Fabricius, 1793)
- Bebearia micans (Aurivillius, 1899)
- Bebearia zonara (Butler, 1871)
- Bebearia mandinga (Felder & Felder, 1860)
- Bebearia oxione squalida (Talbot, 1928)
- Bebearia abesa (Hewitson, 1869)
- Bebearia partita (Aurivillius, 1895)
- Bebearia barce maculata (Aurivillius, 1912)
- Bebearia comus (Ward, 1871)
- Bebearia mardania (Fabricius, 1793)
- Bebearia cocalioides hecqi Holmes, 2001
- Bebearia guineensis (Felder & Felder, 1867)
- Bebearia cocalia katera (van Someren, 1939)
- Bebearia paludicola Holmes, 2001
- Bebearia sophus (Fabricius, 1793)
- Bebearia staudingeri (Aurivillius, 1893)
- Bebearia plistonax (Hewitson, 1874)
- Bebearia elpinice (Hewitson, 1869)
- Bebearia brunhilda (Kirby, 1889)
- Bebearia congolensis (Capronnier, 1889)
- Bebearia occitana Hecq, 1989
- Bebearia severini (Aurivillius, 1897)
- Bebearia phranza (Hewitson, 1865)
- Bebearia laetitia (Plötz, 1880)
- Bebearia flaminia (Staudinger, 1891)
- Bebearia maximiana (Staudinger, 1891)
- Bebearia omo Larsen & Warren, 2005
- Bebearia nivaria (Ward, 1871)
- Bebearia phantasia phantasia (Hewitson, 1865)
- Bebearia phantasia concolor Hecq, 1988
- Bebearia phantasiella (Staudinger, 1891)
- Bebearia demetra obsolescens (Talbot, 1928)
- Bebearia maledicta (Strand, 1912)
- Bebearia tessmanni (Grünberg, 1910)
- Bebearia cutteri cognata (Grünberg, 1910)
- Bebearia innocua (Grose-Smith & Kirby, 1889)
- Bebearia eliensis eliensis (Hewitson, 1866)
- Bebearia eliensis scrutata Hecq, 1989
- Bebearia barombina (Staudinger, 1896)
- Bebearia octogramma (Grose-Smith & Kirby, 1889)
- Bebearia amieti Hecq, 1994
- Bebearia bioculata Hecq, 1998
- Bebearia bouyeri van de Weghe, 2007
- Bebearia chilonis (Hewitson, 1874)
- Bebearia defluera Hecq, 1998
- Bebearia discors Hecq, 1994
- Bebearia ducarmei Hecq, 1987
- Bebearia fontaineana intersecta Hecq, 1990
- Bebearia fontaineana vinula Hecq, 1987
- Bebearia intermedia (Bartel, 1905)
- Bebearia jolyana Hecq, 1989
- Bebearia liberti Hecq, 1998
- Bebearia makala bosmansi Hecq, 1989
- Bebearia peetersi Hecq, 1994
- Bebearia raeveli Hecq, 1989
- Euphaedra rubrocostata (Aurivillius, 1897)
- Euphaedra adolfifriderici Schultze, 1920
- Euphaedra luperca (Hewitson, 1864)
- Euphaedra fucora Hecq, 1979
- Euphaedra luteofasciata Hecq, 1979
- Euphaedra imperialis imperialis Lindemans, 1910
- Euphaedra imperialis gabonica Rothschild, 1918
- Euphaedra imperialis hecqui Darge, 1974
- Euphaedra medon medon (Linnaeus, 1763)
- Euphaedra medon neustetteri Niepelt, 1915
- Euphaedra extensa Hecq, 1981
- Euphaedra calliope calliope Hecq, 1981
- Euphaedra calliope aurichalca Hecq, 1981
- Euphaedra zaddachii zaddachii Dewitz, 1879
- Euphaedra zaddachii elephantina Staudinger, 1891
- Euphaedra mondahensis van de Weghe, Oremans & Hecq, 2005
- Euphaedra xypete (Hewitson, 1865)
- Euphaedra hewitsoni hewitsoni Hecq, 1974
- Euphaedra hewitsoni sumptuosa Hecq, 1974
- Euphaedra acuta Hecq, 1977
- Euphaedra maxima Holland, 1920
- Euphaedra dargei Hecq, 1975
- Euphaedra brevis Hecq, 1977
- Euphaedra karschi Bartel, 1905
- Euphaedra pervaga Hecq, 1996
- Euphaedra hollandi Hecq, 1974
- Euphaedra diffusa Gaede, 1916
- Euphaedra ansorgei Rothschild, 1918
- Euphaedra imitans Holland, 1893
- Euphaedra cyparissa aurata Carpenter, 1895
- Euphaedra cyparissa nominalina Pyrcz & Knoop, 2013
- Euphaedra sarcoptera cyparissoides Hecq, 1979
- Euphaedra themis (Hübner, 1807)
- Euphaedra laboureana bernaudi Hecq, 1996
- Euphaedra permixtum permixtum (Butler, 1873)
- Euphaedra permixtum diva Hecq, 1982
- Euphaedra aureola Kirby, 1889
- Euphaedra exerrata Hecq, 1982
- Euphaedra janetta (Butler, 1871)
- Euphaedra splendens Hecq, 1992
- Euphaedra stellata Hecq, 1991
- Euphaedra justicia Staudinger, 1886
- Euphaedra appositiva Hecq, 1982
- Euphaedra adonina adonina (Hewitson, 1865)
- Euphaedra adonina spectacularis Hecq, 1997
- Euphaedra adonina prasina Hecq, 1991
- Euphaedra piriformis Hecq, 1982
- Euphaedra uniformis Berger, 1981
- Euphaedra controversa Hecq, 1997
- Euphaedra ceres electra Hecq, 1983
- Euphaedra sarita (Sharpe, 1891)
- Euphaedra viridicaerulea Bartel, 1905
- Euphaedra ravola (Hewitson, 1866)
- Euphaedra margaritifera Schultze, 1920
- Euphaedra preussiana preussiana Gaede, 1916
- Euphaedra preussiana protea Hecq, 1983
- Euphaedra cottoni Sharpe, 1907
- Euphaedra rezia (Hewitson, 1866)
- Euphaedra proserpina proserpina Hecq, 1983
- Euphaedra proserpina tisiphona Hecq, 1983
- Euphaedra persephona Hecq, 1983
- Euphaedra dargeana Hecq, 1980
- Euphaedra demeter Hecq, 1983
- Euphaedra velutina Hecq, 1997
- Euphaedra subprotea Hecq, 1986
- Euphaedra densamacula Hecq, 1997
- Euphaedra compacta Hecq, 1997
- Euphaedra preussi Staudinger, 1891
- Euphaedra vicina Hecq, 1984
- Euphaedra fulvofasciata Hecq, 1984
- Euphaedra fascinata Hecq, 1984
- Euphaedra ochrovirens Hecq, 1984
- Euphaedra miranda Hecq, 1984
- Euphaedra eleus (Drury, 1782)
- Euphaedra simplex Hecq, 1978
- Euphaedra alacris Hecq, 1978
- Euphaedra amieti Hecq, 1993
- Euphaedra ferruginea Staudinger, 1886
- Euphaedra semipreussiana Hecq, 1993
- Euphaedra bouyeri Hecq, 1993
- Euphaedra castanoides Hecq, 1985
- Euphaedra edwardsii (van der Hoeven, 1845)
- Euphaedra ruspina (Hewitson, 1865)
- Euphaedra harpalyce harpalyce (Cramer, 1777)
- Euphaedra harpalyce spatiosa (Mabille, 1876)
- Euphaedra losinga wardi (Druce, 1874)
- Euphaedra viridirupta Hecq, 2007
- Euphaedra opulenta Hecq & Van de Weghe, 2005
- Euphaedra mambili Hecq, 2001
- Euphaedra sardetta Berger, 1981
- Euphaedra vulnerata Schultze, 1916
- Euptera amieti Collins & Libert, 1998
- Euptera aurantiaca Amiet, 1998
- Euptera choveti Amiet & Collins, 1998
- Euptera crowleyi crowleyi (Kirby, 1889)
- Euptera crowleyi centralis Libert, 1995
- Euptera elabontas (Hewitson, 1871)
- Euptera falsathyma Schultze, 1916
- Euptera freyja inexpectata Chovet, 1998
- Euptera freyja ornata Libert, 1998
- Euptera hirundo Staudinger, 1891
- Euptera intricata Aurivillius, 1894
- Euptera liberti Collins, 1987
- Euptera mimetica Collins & Amiet, 1998
- Euptera mirifica Carpenter & Jackson, 1950
- Euptera mocquerysi Staudinger, 1893
- Euptera neptunus Joicey & Talbot, 1924
- Euptera plantroui Chovet & Collins, 1998
- Euptera pluto (Ward, 1873)
- Euptera richelmanni Weymer, 1907
- Euptera schultzei Libert & Chovet, 1998
- Euptera semirufa Joicey & Talbot, 1921
- Pseudathyma callina (Grose-Smith, 1898)
- Pseudathyma cyrili Chovet, 2002
- Pseudathyma endjami Libert, 2002
- Pseudathyma michelae Libert, 2002
- Pseudathyma neptidina Karsch, 1894

=== Heliconiinae ===
==== Acraeini ====
- Acraea kraka Aurivillius, 1893
- Acraea admatha Hewitson, 1865
- Acraea camaena (Drury, 1773)
- Acraea endoscota Le Doux, 1928
- Acraea eugenia ochreata Grünberg, 1910
- Acraea leucographa Ribbe, 1889
- Acraea neobule Doubleday, 1847
- Acraea quirina (Fabricius, 1781)
- Acraea zetes (Linnaeus, 1758)
- Acraea abdera Hewitson, 1852
- Acraea cepheus (Linnaeus, 1758)
- Acraea egina (Cramer, 1775)
- Acraea pseudegina Westwood, 1852
- Acraea rogersi Hewitson, 1873
- Acraea sykesi Sharpe, 1902
- Acraea alcinoe camerunica (Aurivillius, 1893)
- Acraea consanguinea (Aurivillius, 1893)
- Acraea elongata (Butler, 1874)
- Acraea epaea (Cramer, 1779)
- Acraea epiprotea (Butler, 1874)
- Acraea excisa (Butler, 1874)
- Acraea formosa (Butler, 1874)
- Acraea indentata (Butler, 1895)
- Acraea leopoldina macrosticha (Bethune-Baker, 1908)
- Acraea macarista latefasciata (Suffert, 1904)
- Acraea obliqua (Aurivillius, 1913)
- Acraea tellus (Aurivillius, 1893)
- Acraea umbra umbra (Drury, 1782)
- Acraea umbra macarioides (Aurivillius, 1893)
- Acraea vestalis stavelia (Suffert, 1904)
- Acraea acerata Hewitson, 1874
- Acraea alciope Hewitson, 1852
- Acraea althoffi bitjana Bethune-Baker, 1926
- Acraea aurivillii Staudinger, 1896
- Acraea bonasia (Fabricius, 1775)
- Acraea buschbecki Dewitz, 1889
- Acraea circeis (Drury, 1782)
- Acraea encedon (Linnaeus, 1758)
- Acraea serena (Fabricius, 1775)
- Acraea iturina Grose-Smith, 1890
- Acraea jodutta (Fabricius, 1793)
- Acraea lumiri Bethune-Baker, 1908
- Acraea lycoa Godart, 1819
- Acraea oberthueri Butler, 1895
- Acraea orestia Hewitson, 1874
- Acraea pelopeia Staudinger, 1896
- Acraea peneleos peneleos Ward, 1871
- Acraea peneleos pelasgius Grose-Smith, 1900
- Acraea pentapolis Ward, 1871
- Acraea polis Pierre, 1999
- Acraea pharsalus Ward, 1871
- Acraea karschi Aurivillius, 1899
- Acraea uvui balina Karsch, 1892
- Acraea vesperalis Grose-Smith, 1890
- Acraea viviana Staudinger, 1896
- Acraea wigginsi occidentalis Bethune-Baker, 1926
- Acraea alticola Schultze, 1923
- Acraea oreas oboti Collins & Larsen, 2000
- Acraea orina Hewitson, 1874
- Acraea orinata Oberthür, 1893
- Acraea parrhasia parrhasia (Fabricius, 1793)
- Acraea parrhasia servona Godart, 1819
- Acraea penelope Staudinger, 1896
- Acraea translucida Eltringham, 1912
- Acraea perenna Doubleday, 1847
- Acraea semivitrea Aurivillius, 1895
- Acraea simulator Ackery, 1995

==== Argynnini ====
- Issoria baumanni excelsior (Butler, 1896)

==== Vagrantini ====
- Lachnoptera anticlia (Hübner, 1819)
- Phalanta eurytis (Doubleday, 1847)
- Phalanta phalantha aethiopica (Rothschild & Jordan, 1903)

== Hesperiidae ==
=== Coeliadinae ===
- Coeliades bixana Evans, 1940
- Coeliades chalybe (Westwood, 1852)
- Coeliades forestan (Stoll, [1782])
- Coeliades hanno (Plötz, 1879)
- Coeliades libeon (Druce, 1875)
- Coeliades pisistratus (Fabricius, 1793)
- Pyrrhochalcia iphis (Drury, 1773)

=== Pyrginae ===
==== Celaenorrhinini ====
- Loxolexis dimidia (Holland, 1896)
- Loxolexis hollandi (Druce, 1909)
- Loxolexis drucei (Larsen, 2002)
- Loxolexis holocausta (Mabille, 1891)
- Katreus johnstoni (Butler, 1888)
- Celaenorrhinus bakolo Miller, 1964
- Celaenorrhinus bettoni Butler, 1902
- Celaenorrhinus boadicea (Hewitson, 1877)
- Celaenorrhinus chrysoglossa (Mabille, 1891)
- Celaenorrhinus dargei Berger, 1976
- Celaenorrhinus galenus (Fabricius, 1793)
- Celaenorrhinus homeyeri (Plötz, 1880)
- Celaenorrhinus illustris (Mabille, 1891)
- Celaenorrhinus intermixtus Aurivillius, 1896
- Celaenorrhinus meditrina (Hewitson, 1877)
- Celaenorrhinus milleri Collins & Larsen, 2003
- Celaenorrhinus nigropunctata netta Evans, 1937
- Celaenorrhinus ovalis Evans, 1937
- Celaenorrhinus perlustris mona Evans, 1937
- Celaenorrhinus plagiatus Berger, 1976
- Celaenorrhinus pooanus Aurivillius, 1910
- Celaenorrhinus proxima proxima (Mabille, 1877)
- Celaenorrhinus proxima maesseni Berger, 1976
- Celaenorrhinus rutilans (Mabille, 1877)
- Eretis camerona Evans, 1937
- Eretis lugens (Rogenhofer, 1891)
- Eretis melania Mabille, 1891
- Eretis vaga Evans, 1937
- Sarangesa bouvieri (Mabille, 1877)
- Sarangesa brigida brigida (Plötz, 1879)
- Sarangesa brigida sanaga Miller, 1964
- Sarangesa maculata (Mabille, 1891)
- Sarangesa majorella (Mabille, 1891)
- Sarangesa tertullianus (Fabricius, 1793)
- Sarangesa thecla (Plötz, 1879)
- Sarangesa tricerata (Mabille, 1891)

==== Tagiadini ====
- Tagiades flesus (Fabricius, 1781)
- Eagris decastigma decastigma Mabille, 1891
- Eagris decastigma fuscosa (Holland, 1893)
- Eagris denuba (Plötz, 1879)
- Eagris hereus hereus (Druce, 1875)
- Eagris hereus quaterna (Mabille, 1890)
- Eagris lucetia (Hewitson, 1875)
- Eagris subalbida (Holland, 1893)
- Eagris tetrastigma (Mabille, 1891)
- Eagris tigris liberti Collins & Larsen, 2005
- Calleagris lacteus (Mabille, 1877)
- Calleagris landbecki (Druce, 1910)
- Procampta rara Holland, 1892
- Netrobalane canopus (Trimen, 1864)
- Abantis bismarcki Karsch, 1892
- Abantis contigua Evans, 1937
- Abantis efulensis Holland, 1896
- Abantis elegantula (Mabille, 1890)
- Abantis eltringhami Jordan, 1932
- Abantis ja Druce, 1909
- Abantis leucogaster (Mabille, 1890)
- Abantis lucretia Druce, 1909
- Abantis rubra Holland, 1920

==== Carcharodini ====
- Spialia ploetzi (Aurivillius, 1891)

=== Hesperiinae ===
==== Aeromachini ====
- Astictopterus abjecta (Snellen, 1872)
- Astictopterus punctulata (Butler, 1895)
- Prosopalpus debilis (Plötz, 1879)
- Prosopalpus saga Evans, 1937
- Prosopalpus styla Evans, 1937
- Kedestes callicles (Hewitson, 1868)
- Kedestes protensa Butler, 1901
- Gorgyra aburae (Plötz, 1879)
- Gorgyra afikpo Druce, 1909
- Gorgyra aretina (Hewitson, 1878)
- Gorgyra bibulus Riley, 1929
- Gorgyra bina Evans, 1937
- Gorgyra warreni Collins & Larsen, 2008
- Gorgyra diversata Evans, 1937
- Gorgyra heterochrus (Mabille, 1890)
- Gorgyra kalinzu Evans, 1949
- Gorgyra minima Holland, 1896
- Gorgyra mocquerysii Holland, 1896
- Gorgyra pali Evans, 1937
- Gorgyra rubescens Holland, 1896
- Gorgyra sara Evans, 1937
- Gorgyra sola Evans, 1937
- Gyrogra subnotata (Holland, 1894)
- Teniorhinus ignita (Mabille, 1877)
- Teniorhinus watsoni Holland, 1892
- Teniorhinus niger (Druce, 1910)
- Ceratrichia argyrosticta (Plötz, 1879)
- Ceratrichia aurea Druce, 1910
- Ceratrichia brunnea ialemia Druce, 1909
- Ceratrichia clara clara Evans, 1937
- Ceratrichia clara medea Evans, 1937
- Ceratrichia flava Hewitson, 1878
- Ceratrichia nothus makomensis Strand, 1913
- Ceratrichia phocion phocion (Fabricius, 1781)
- Ceratrichia phocion camerona Miller, 1971
- Ceratrichia punctata Holland, 1896
- Ceratrichia semilutea Mabille, 1891
- Ceratrichia weberi Miller, 1964
- Ceratrichia wollastoni Heron, 1909
- Pardaleodes bule Holland, 1896
- Pardaleodes edipus (Stoll, 1781)
- Pardaleodes fan (Holland, 1894)
- Pardaleodes incerta murcia (Plötz, 1883)
- Pardaleodes sator sator (Westwood, 1852)
- Pardaleodes sator pusiella Mabille, 1877
- Pardaleodes tibullus (Fabricius, 1793)
- Pardaleodes xanthopeplus Holland, 1892
- Xanthodisca astrape (Holland, 1892)
- Xanthodisca rega (Mabille, 1890)
- Xanthodisca vibius (Hewitson, 1878)
- Acada annulifer (Holland, 1892)
- Rhabdomantis galatia (Hewitson, 1868)
- Rhabdomantis sosia (Mabille, 1891)
- Osmodes adon (Mabille, 1890)
- Osmodes adonia Evans, 1937
- Osmodes adosus (Mabille, 1890)
- Osmodes costatus Aurivillius, 1896
- Osmodes distincta Holland, 1896
- Osmodes hollandi Evans, 1937
- Osmodes laronia (Hewitson, 1868)
- Osmodes lindseyi Miller, 1964
- Osmodes lux Holland, 1892
- Osmodes omar Swinhoe, 1916
- Osmodes thora (Plötz, 1884)
- Parosmodes lentiginosa (Holland, 1896)
- Paracleros biguttulus (Mabille, 1890)
- Paracleros substrigata (Holland, 1893)
- Osphantes ogowena (Mabille, 1891)
- Acleros bibundica Strand, 1913
- Acleros mackenii olaus (Plötz, 1884)
- Acleros nigrapex Strand, 1913
- Acleros ploetzi Mabille, 1890
- Acleros sparsum Druce, 1909
- Semalea arela (Mabille, 1891)
- Semalea atrio (Mabille, 1891)
- Semalea kola Evans, 1937
- Semalea pulvina (Plötz, 1879)
- Semalea sextilis (Plötz, 1886)
- Hypoleucis ophiusa (Hewitson, 1866)
- Hypoleucis sophia Evans, 1937
- Hypoleucis tripunctata truda Evans, 1937
- Meza banda (Evans, 1937)
- Meza cybeutes (Holland, 1894)
- Meza elba (Evans, 1937)
- Meza indusiata (Mabille, 1891)
- Meza leucophaea (Holland, 1894)
- Meza mabea (Holland, 1894)
- Meza meza (Hewitson, 1877)
- Paronymus budonga (Evans, 1938)
- Paronymus nevea (Druce, 1910)
- Paronymus xanthias (Mabille, 1891)
- Paronymus xanthioides (Holland, 1892)
- Andronymus caesar (Fabricius, 1793)
- Andronymus evander (Mabille, 1890)
- Andronymus fenestrella Bethune-Baker, 1908
- Andronymus gander Evans, 1947
- Andronymus helles Evans, 1937
- Andronymus hero Evans, 1937
- Andronymus marcus Usher, 1980
- Andronymus neander (Plötz, 1884)
- Chondrolepis nero Evans, 1937
- Chondrolepis niveicornis (Plötz, 1883)
- Zophopetes cerymica (Hewitson, 1867)
- Zophopetes dysmephila (Trimen, 1868)
- Zophopetes ganda Evans, 1937
- Zophopetes haifa Evans, 1937
- Gamia buchholzi (Plötz, 1879)
- Gamia shelleyi (Sharpe, 1890)
- Artitropa cama Evans, 1937
- Artitropa comus (Stoll, 1782)
- Artitropa reducta Aurivillius, 1925
- Mopala orma (Plötz, 1879)
- Gretna balenge (Holland, 1891)
- Gretna carmen Evans, 1937
- Gretna cylinda (Hewitson, 1876)
- Gretna lacida (Hewitson, 1876)
- Gretna leakeyi Collins & Larsen, 1995
- Gretna waga (Plötz, 1886)
- Gretna zaremba (Plötz, 1884)
- Pteroteinon caenira (Hewitson, 1867)
- Pteroteinon capronnieri (Plötz, 1879)
- Pteroteinon ceucaenira (Druce, 1910)
- Pteroteinon concaenira Belcastro & Larsen, 1996
- Pteroteinon iricolor (Holland, 1890)
- Pteroteinon laterculus (Holland, 1890)
- Pteroteinon laufella (Hewitson, 1868)
- Pteroteinon pruna Evans, 1937
- Leona binoevatus (Mabille, 1891)
- Leona maracanda (Hewitson, 1876)
- Leona lota Evans, 1937
- Leona lena Evans, 1937
- Leona leonora (Plötz, 1879)
- Leona stoehri (Karsch, 1893)
- Leona meloui (Riley, 1926)
- Leona halma Evans, 1937
- Leona lissa Evans, 1937
- Leona luehderi (Plötz, 1879)
- Caenides soritia (Hewitson, 1876)
- Caenides kangvensis Holland, 1896
- Caenides xychus (Mabille, 1891)
- Caenides benga (Holland, 1891)
- Caenides otilia Belcastro, 1990
- Caenides dacenilla Aurivillius, 1925
- Caenides dacela (Hewitson, 1876)
- Caenides hidaroides Aurivillius, 1896
- Caenides dacena (Hewitson, 1876)
- Monza alberti (Holland, 1896)
- Monza cretacea (Snellen, 1872)
- Melphina flavina Lindsey & Miller, 1965
- Melphina malthina (Hewitson, 1876)
- Melphina melphis (Holland, 1893)
- Melphina noctula (Druce, 1909)
- Melphina statirides (Holland, 1896)
- Melphina tarace (Mabille, 1891)
- Melphina unistriga (Holland, 1893)
- Fresna carlo Evans, 1937
- Fresna cojo (Karsch, 1893)
- Fresna jacquelinae Collins & Larsen, 2003
- Fresna maesseni Miller, 1971
- Fresna netopha (Hewitson, 1878)
- Fresna nyassae (Hewitson, 1878)
- Platylesches batangae (Holland, 1894)
- Platylesches galesa (Hewitson, 1877)
- Platylesches lamba Neave, 1910
- Platylesches picanini (Holland, 1894)
- Platylesches robustus villa Evans, 1937

==== Baorini ====
- Zenonia zeno (Trimen, 1864)
- Borbo fallax (Gaede, 1916)
- Borbo fanta (Evans, 1937)
- Borbo fatuellus (Hopffer, 1855)
- Borbo gemella (Mabille, 1884)
- Borbo perobscura (Druce, 1912)
- Parnara monasi (Trimen & Bowker, 1889)

=== Heteropterinae ===
- Metisella abdeli (Krüger, 1928)
- Metisella kambove gamma de Jong
- Metisella kumbona Evans, 1937
- Metisella midas malda Evans, 1937
- Metisella tsadicus (Aurivillius, 1905)
- Lepella lepeletier (Latreille, 1824)

== See also ==
- Geography of Cameroon
- Cameroonian Highlands forests
