= Euphaedra fucora =

Scientific classification
- Kingdom: Animalia
- Phylum: Arthropoda
- Class: Insecta
- Order: Lepidoptera
- Family: Nymphalidae
- Genus: Euphaedra
- Species: E. fucora

Binomial name
- Euphaedra fucora Hecq, 1979

Synonyms
- Euphaedra luteofasciata fucora Hecq, 1979; Euphaedra (Proteuphaedra) fucora

Species of butterfly

Euphaedra fucora, the Oban blue forester, is a butterfly in the family Nymphalidae. It is found in south-eastern Nigeria and Cameroon. The habitat consists of forests.

Adults feed on fallen fruit. Images: Types Royal Museum Central Africa

== Taxonomy ==
First described as a subspecies of Euphaedra luperca.
