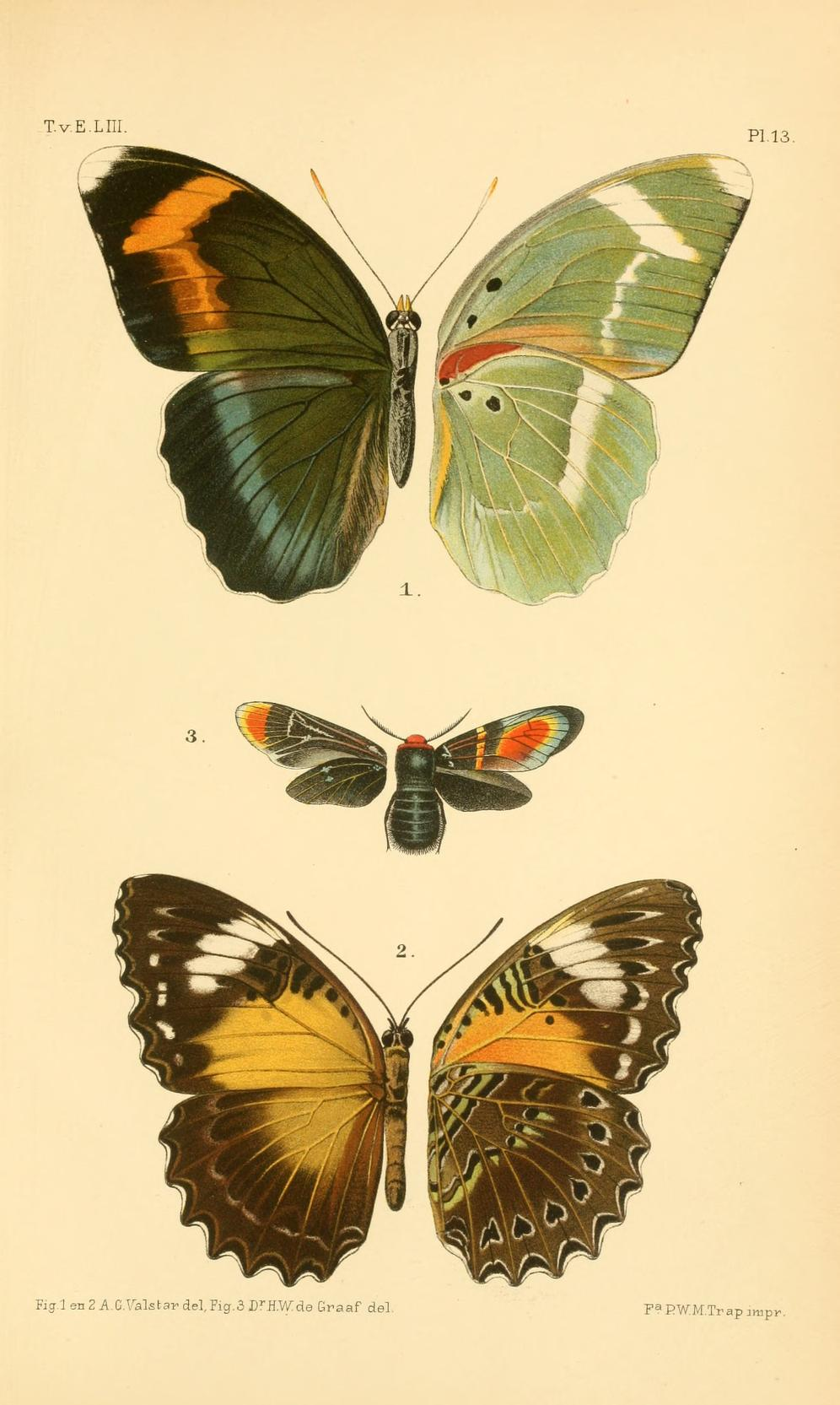

Scientific classification
- Kingdom: Animalia
- Phylum: Arthropoda
- Class: Insecta
- Order: Lepidoptera
- Family: Nymphalidae
- Genus: Euphaedra
- Species: E. imperialis

Binomial name
- Euphaedra imperialis Lindemans, 1910

Synonyms
- Euphaedra (Proteuphaedra) imperialis; Euphaedra luperca var. strasseni Schultze, 1912

= Euphaedra imperialis =

Species of butterfly

Euphaedra imperialis, the imperial forester, is a butterfly in the family Nymphalidae. It is found in Nigeria, Cameroon, Gabon, and the Democratic Republic of the Congo.

== Description ==
E. imperialis Lindemans. The very beautiful female on which this species is based closely approaches luperca. Whether it is only a form of this or an independent species can only be decided by comparing larger material. Both wings blackish above, the basal part tinged with dark green to beyond the middle; the subapical band of the forewing is about 6 mm. in breadth, bright ochre-yellow, and reaches vein 4, but is then continued by a band running parallel with the distal margin at a distance of about 8 mm.; this band is orange-yellow in cellules 3, 2 and the anterior part of cellule 1 b and bluish at the hindmargin; on the hindwing it is continued by a somewhat narrower blue transverse band nearly to the anal angle; the fringes of the hindwing are pure white; the under surface is light bluish green and marked almost exactly as in luperca, only differing in having the white subapical band of the forewing connected with vein 1 by a white transverse line and in the broad white transverse band of the hindwing being quite straight and hence at vein 4 nearly 9 mm. from the distal margin. The white apical spot of the forewing large on both surfaces. Cameroons

== Subspecies ==
- E. i. imperialis (southern Cameroon)
- E. i. gabonica Rothschild, 1918 (Nigeria, western Cameroon, Gabon)
- E. i. hecqui Darge, 1974 (Nigeria, Cameroon)
- E. i. arta Hecq, 1979 (Democratic Republic of Congo: Sankuru)

== Biology ==
The habitat consists of forests.
