= Euptera intricata =

Scientific classification
- Kingdom: Animalia
- Phylum: Arthropoda
- Clade: Pancrustacea
- Class: Insecta
- Order: Lepidoptera
- Family: Nymphalidae
- Genus: Euptera
- Species: E. intricata

Binomial name
- Euptera intricata Aurivillius, 1894

Species of butterfly

Euptera intricata is a butterfly in the family Nymphalidae. It is found in Cameroon.

== See also ==
- List of butterflies of Cameroon
