= Euphaedra calliope =

Scientific classification
- Kingdom: Animalia
- Phylum: Arthropoda
- Class: Insecta
- Order: Lepidoptera
- Family: Nymphalidae
- Genus: Euphaedra
- Species: E. calliope

Binomial name
- Euphaedra calliope Hecq, 1981

Synonyms
- Euphaedra (Gausapia) calliope

Species of butterfly

Euphaedra calliope is a butterfly species in the family Nymphalidae. It is found in Cameroon.

== Subspecies ==
- Euphaedra calliope calliope (Cameroon)
- Euphaedra calliope aurichalca Hecq, 1981 (Cameroon)
