= Willema tsadica =

Scientific classification
- Kingdom: Animalia
- Phylum: Arthropoda
- Class: Insecta
- Order: Lepidoptera
- Family: Hesperiidae
- Genus: Willema
- Species: W. tsadicus

Binomial name
- Willema tsadicus (Aurivillius, 1905)

Synonyms
- List: Cyclopides formosus var. tsadicus Aurivillius, 1905; Cyclopides ogwanyi Bethune-Baker, 1906; Cyclopides birbiranus Ungemach, 1932; Metisella tsadicus (Aurivillius, 1905)

Species of butterfly

Willema tsadicus, the northern netted sylph, is a species of butterfly in the family Hesperiidae. It is found in Guinea, north-eastern Nigeria, Cameroon (from the northern part of the country to the Lake Chad area), the Central African Republic, southern Sudan, northern Uganda and south-western Ethiopia.
