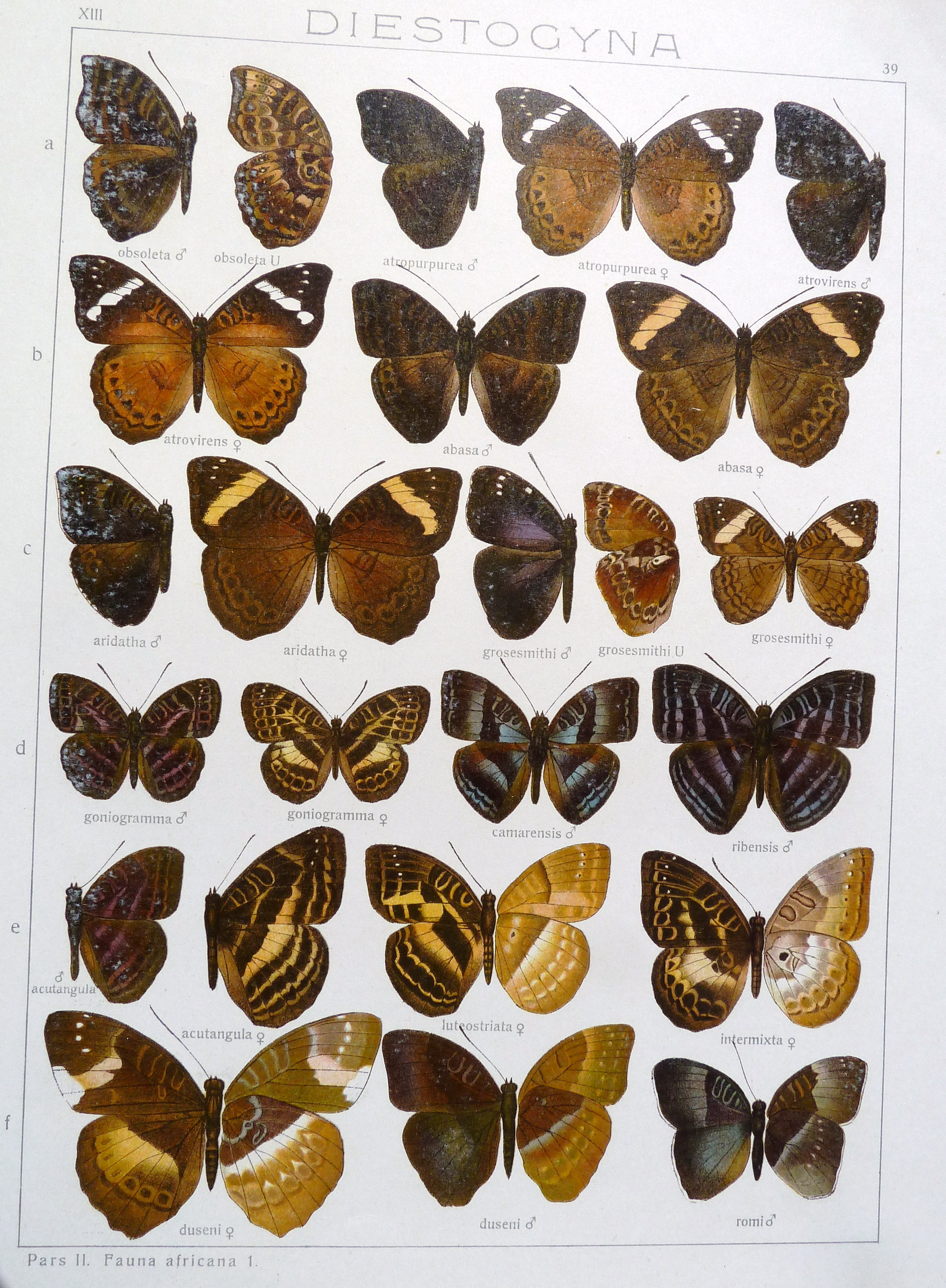
- In Adalbert Seitz's Fauna Africana

Scientific classification
- Domain: Eukaryota
- Kingdom: Animalia
- Phylum: Arthropoda
- Class: Insecta
- Order: Lepidoptera
- Family: Nymphalidae
- Genus: Euriphene
- Species: E. duseni

Binomial name
- Euriphene duseni (Aurivillius, 1892)

Synonyms
- Aterica duseni Aurivillius, 1892; Euriphene (Euriphene) duseni; Euriphene canui legeriana Hecq, 1987

= Euriphene duseni =

Species of butterfly

Euriphene duseni, or Dusen's nymph, is a butterfly in the family Nymphalidae. It is found in Nigeria and Cameroon. The habitat consists of dense forests.

The larvae feed on Brazzeia species.

== Subspecies ==
- Euriphene duseni duseni (southern Cameroon)
- Euriphene duseni legeriana Hecq, 1987 (Nigeria, western Cameroon)
