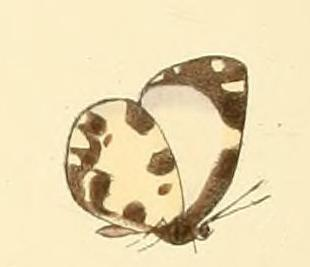

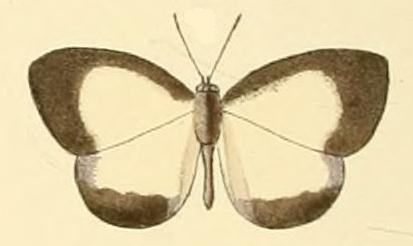

Scientific classification
- Domain: Eukaryota
- Kingdom: Animalia
- Phylum: Arthropoda
- Class: Insecta
- Order: Lepidoptera
- Family: Lycaenidae
- Genus: Falcuna
- Species: F. libyssa

Binomial name
- Falcuna libyssa (Hewitson, 1866)

Synonyms
- Liptena libyssa Hewitson, 1866

= Falcuna libyssa =

Species of butterfly

Falcuna libyssa, the common marble, is a butterfly in the family Lycaenidae. It is found in Nigeria, Cameroon, Equatorial Guinea and Angola. The habitat consists of primary and secondary forests with a canopy.

Adults of both sexes feed at extrafloral nectaries of Marantaceae and other creepers.

== Subspecies ==
- Falcuna libyssa libyssa (eastern Nigeria, western Cameroon)
- Falcuna libyssa angolensis Stempffer & Bennett, 1963 (northern Angola)
- Falcuna libyssa cameroonica Stempffer & Bennett, 1963 (Cameroon: except the west, Equatorial Guinea: Mbini)
