= Willema kumbona =

Scientific classification
- Kingdom: Animalia
- Phylum: Arthropoda
- Class: Insecta
- Order: Lepidoptera
- Family: Hesperiidae
- Genus: Willema
- Species: W. kumbona

Binomial name
- Willema kumbona (Evans, 1937)

Synonyms
- Metisella kumbona Evans, 1937

Species of butterfly

Willema kumbona is a species of butterfly in the family Hesperiidae. It was described by Evans in 1937. It is found in Cameroon and Nigeria.
