= Bebearia fontaineana =

Scientific classification
- Kingdom: Animalia
- Phylum: Arthropoda
- Class: Insecta
- Order: Lepidoptera
- Family: Nymphalidae
- Genus: Bebearia
- Species: B. fontaineana

Binomial name
- Bebearia fontaineana Hecq, 1987

Synonyms
- Bebearia maximiana fontaineana Hecq, 1987; Bebearia maximiana intersecta Hecq, 1990; Bebearia maximiana vinula Hecq, 1987; Bebearia vinula

Species of butterfly

Bebearia fontaineana is a butterfly in the family Nymphalidae. It is found in Cameroon and the Democratic Republic of the Congo. The habitat consists of wet forests.

== Subspecies ==
- Bebearia fontaineana fontaineana (Democratic Republic of the Congo: Sankuru)
- Bebearia fontaineana intersecta Hecq, 1990 (Cameroon)
- Bebearia fontaineana vinula Hecq, 1987 (eastern Nigeria, western Cameroon)
