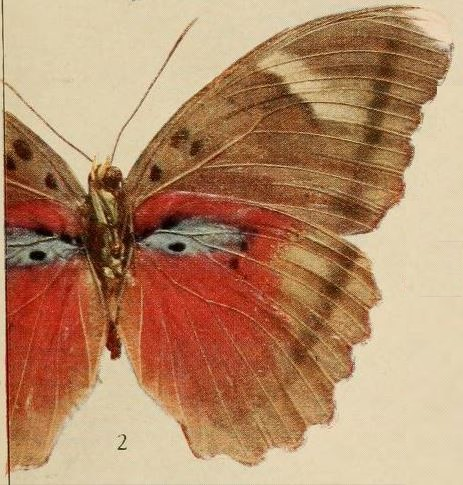
- Female
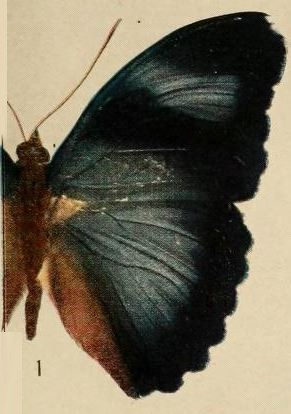
- Male

Scientific classification
- Kingdom: Animalia
- Phylum: Arthropoda
- Class: Insecta
- Order: Lepidoptera
- Family: Nymphalidae
- Genus: Euphaedra
- Species: E. hollandi

Binomial name
- Euphaedra hollandi Hecq, 1974

Synonyms
- Euphaedra (Xypetana) hollandi; Euphaedra cyanea Holland, 1920

= Euphaedra hollandi =

Species of butterfly

Euphaedra hollandi is a butterfly in the family Nymphalidae. It is found in Cameroon, the Republic of the Congo, the Democratic Republic of the Congo, the Central African Republic, western Uganda and western Tanzania. The habitat consists of dense forests.

Adults are attracted to fallen fruit.
