= Euptera freyja =

Scientific classification
- Kingdom: Animalia
- Phylum: Arthropoda
- Clade: Pancrustacea
- Class: Insecta
- Order: Lepidoptera
- Family: Nymphalidae
- Genus: Euptera
- Species: E. freyja

Binomial name
- Euptera freyja Hancock, 1984

Synonyms
- Euptera bakeri Berger, 1981 – nomen nudum; Euptera freyia

Species of butterfly

Euptera freyja, also known as uniform pilot, is a butterfly in the family Nymphalidae. It is found in Cameroon, Gabon, the Democratic Republic of the Congo, and Zambia. It is named after the goddess Freyja. It inhabits forests.

The forewing length is about 25 mm (0.98 in). Males and females are very dissimilar; males are black and primrose-yellow, while females are largely orange brown.

== Subspecies ==
There are two recognized subspecies:

- Euptera freyja freyja (north-western Zambia)
- Euptera freyja ornata Libert, 1998 (central Cameroon, Gabon, the Democratic Republic of the Congo (Lusambo, Sankuru, and possibly Cataractes)

Euptera freyja inexpectata Chovet, 1998 from Cameroon is not widely recognized.
