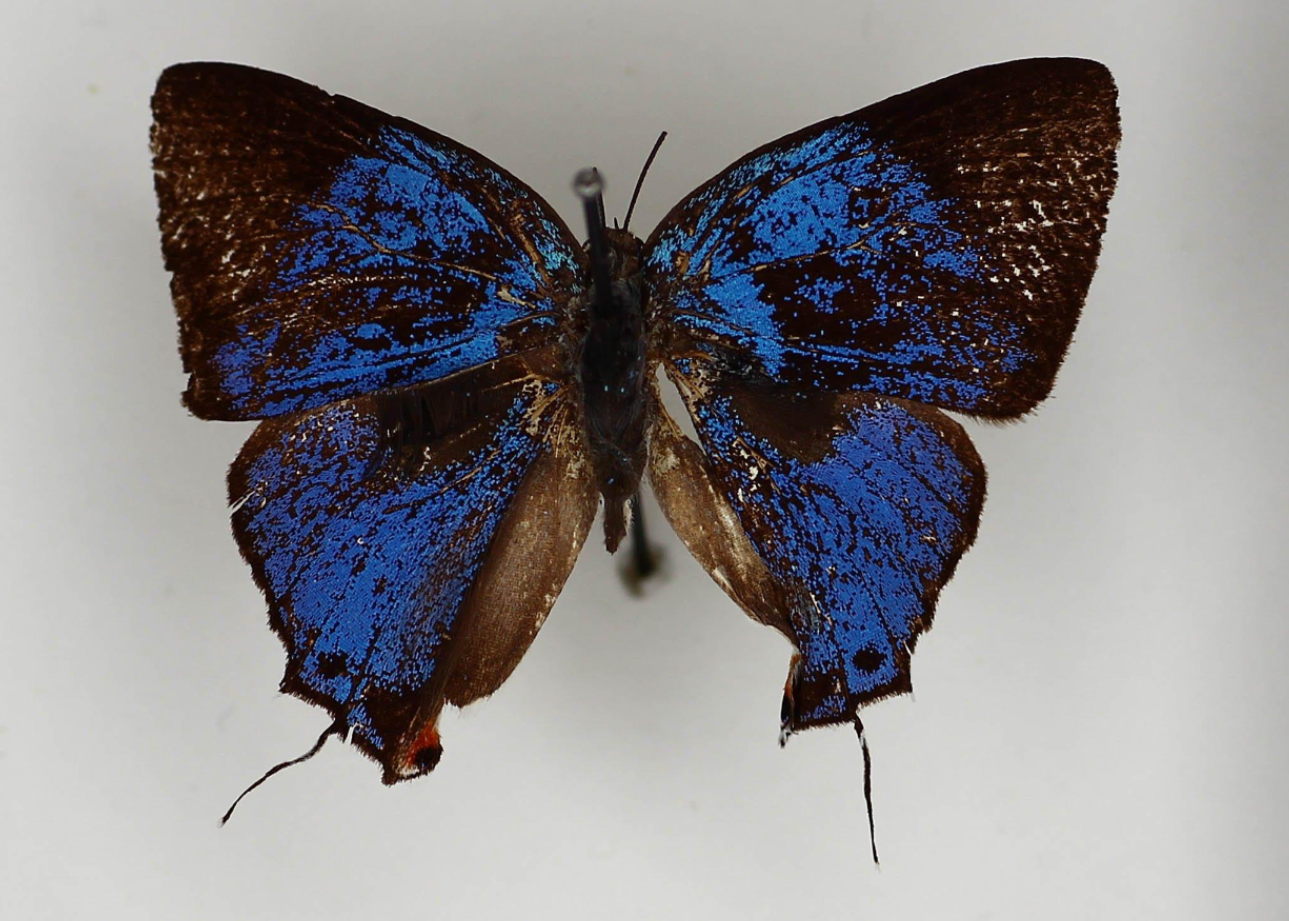

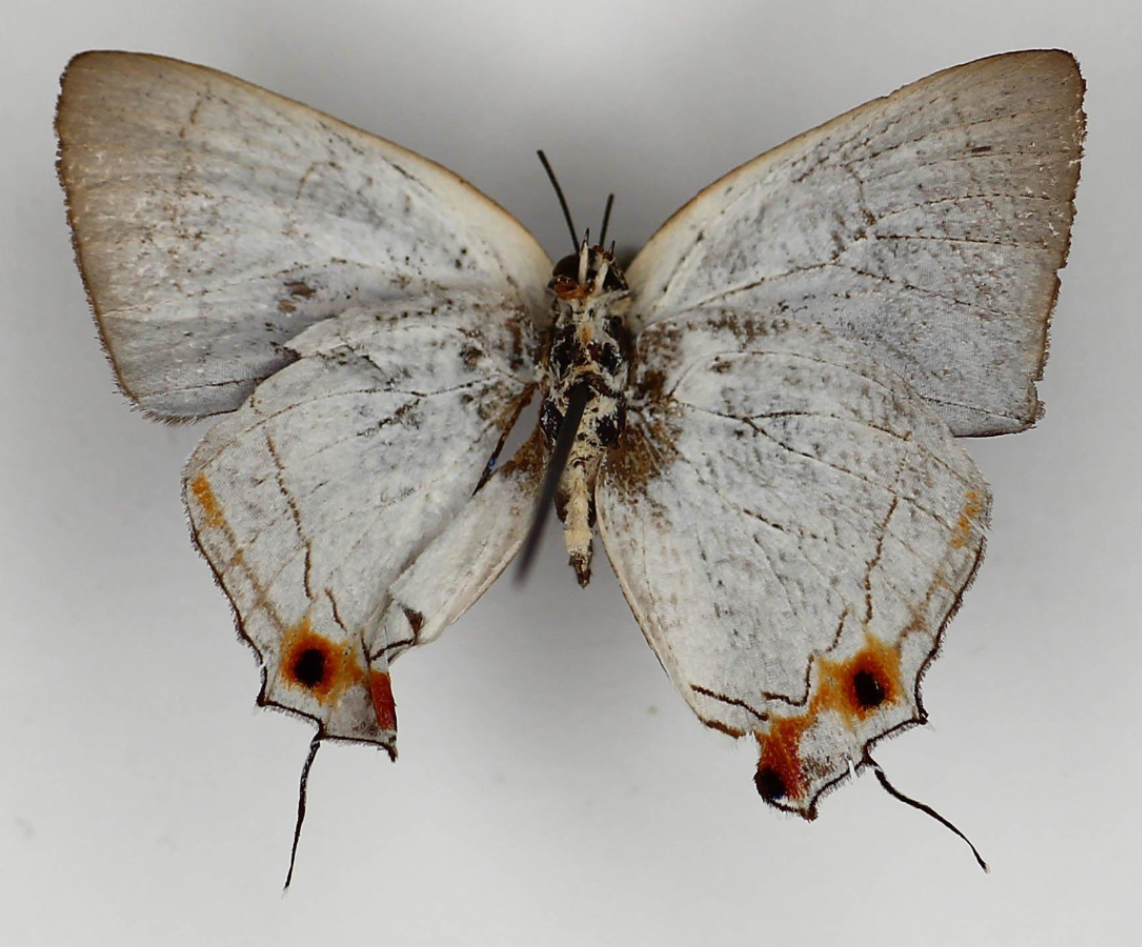

Scientific classification
- Kingdom: Animalia
- Phylum: Arthropoda
- Class: Insecta
- Order: Lepidoptera
- Family: Lycaenidae
- Genus: Iolaus
- Species: I. gabunica

Binomial name
- Iolaus gabunica (Riley, 1928)

Synonyms
- Argiolaus gabunica Riley, 1928; Iolaus (Iolaphilus) gabunica; Iolaphilus gabunica mbami Libert, 1993

= Iolaus gabunica =

Species of butterfly

Iolaus gabunica, the Gabon sapphire, is a butterfly in the family Lycaenidae. It is found in Cameroon, Gabon, Uganda, Kenya and Zambia. The habitat consists of forests.

The larvae feed on Globimetula braunii.

== Subspecies ==
- Iolaus gabunica gabunica (Cameroon, Gabon, Uganda, western Kenya, Zambia)
- Iolaus gabunica mbami (Libert, 1993) (Cameroon)
