= Katreus drucei =

Scientific classification
- Kingdom: Animalia
- Phylum: Arthropoda
- Class: Insecta
- Order: Lepidoptera
- Family: Hesperiidae
- Genus: Katreus
- Species: K. drucei

Binomial name
- Katreus drucei (Larsen, 2002)

Synonyms
- Katreus dimidia f. drucei Evans, 1937; Loxolexis drucei (Larsen, 2002)

Species of butterfly

Katreus drucei is a species of butterfly in the family Hesperiidae. It is found in Cameroon. The habitat consists of forests.
