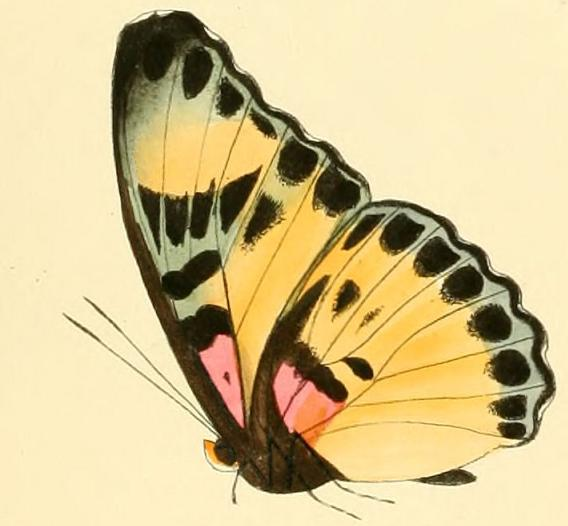

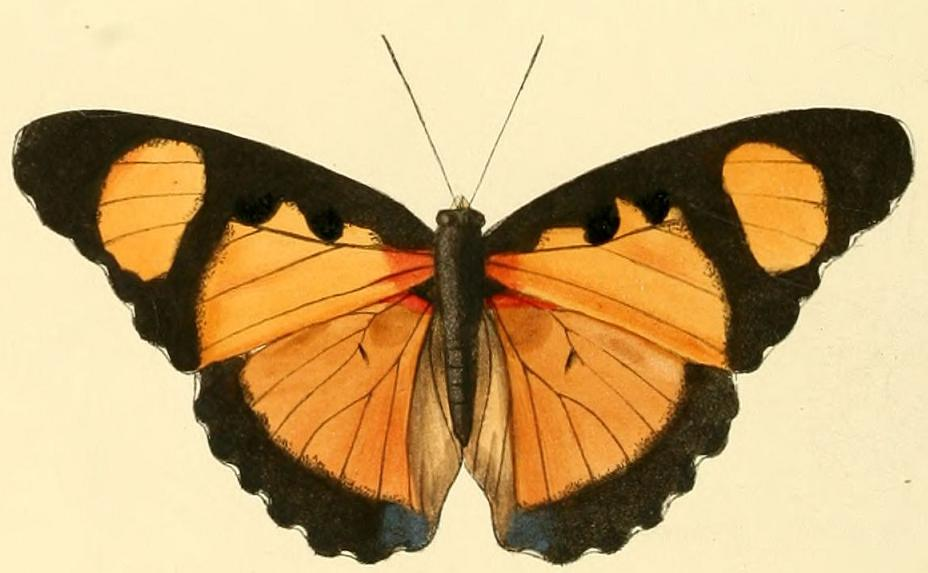

Scientific classification
- Kingdom: Animalia
- Phylum: Arthropoda
- Class: Insecta
- Order: Lepidoptera
- Family: Nymphalidae
- Genus: Euphaedra
- Species: E. adonina

Binomial name
- Euphaedra adonina (Hewitson, 1865)

Synonyms
- Romalaeosoma adonina Hewitson, 1865; Euphaedra (Euphaedrana) adonina; Euphaedra themis f. rotundata Talbot, 1932; Euphaedra adonina reflecta Hecq, 1982; Euphaedra adonina ab. seminigra Schultze, 1920; Euphaedra adonina ab. prasina Schultze, 1920

= Euphaedra adonina =

Species of butterfly

Euphaedra adonina, the golden Themis forester, is a butterfly in the family Nymphalidae. It is found in Nigeria, Cameroon, the Republic of the Congo and the Democratic Republic of the Congo. The habitat consists of forests.

== Subspecies ==
- Euphaedra adonina adonina (Nigeria, western Cameroon)
- Euphaedra adonina prasina Hecq, 1991 (southern Cameroon)
- Euphaedra adonina spectacularis Hecq, 1997 (Cameroon, Congo, Democratic Republic of the Congo)

== Similar species ==
Other members of themis species group q.v.
