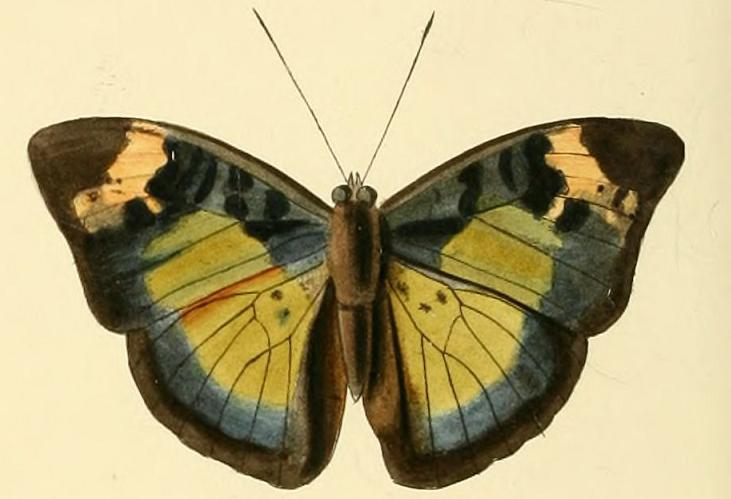

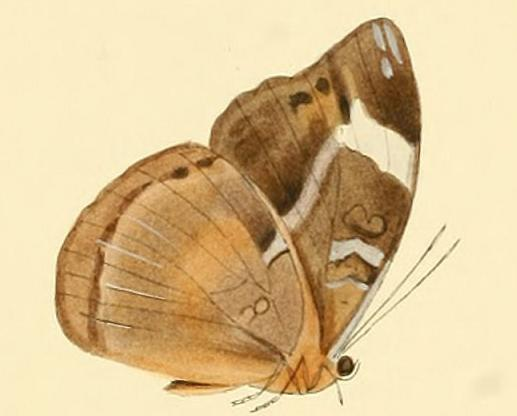

Scientific classification
- Kingdom: Animalia
- Phylum: Arthropoda
- Class: Insecta
- Order: Lepidoptera
- Family: Nymphalidae
- Genus: Bebearia
- Species: B. eliensis

Binomial name
- Bebearia eliensis (Hewitson, 1866)

Synonyms
- Euryphene eliensis Hewitson, 1866; Bebearia (Bebearia) eliensis; Euryphene eliensis ab. scintillans Schultze, 1920; Bebearia scrutata Hecq, 1989; Evena ceres var. unita Capronnier, 1889

= Bebearia eliensis =

Pinkish forester

Species of butterfly

Bebearia eliensis, the pinkish forester, is a butterfly in the family Nymphalidae. It is found in Nigeria, Cameroon, Gabon, the Republic of the Congo, the Central African Republic and Democratic Republic of the Congo. The habitat consists of wetter forests.

E. eliensis Hew. In the male both wings are dark green above with narrow dark marginal band, about 3 mm. in breadth; the forewing with light yellow subapical band, posteriorly somewhat indistinct, and black apex; at the hindmargin a light green half-band 10–11 mm. in breadth, reaching vein 3; the cell of the forewing with 2 or 3 black transverse spots, that of the hindwing with two black dots. The under surface is dark tawny with black ring-spots in the cells but without dark discal spots; the forewing with white subapical band and white apical spot; the hindwing with whitish transverse streaks or transverse spots in the middle of cellules 5–7; both wings with dark brown submarginal line. The female is larger and lighter. Gaboon to Kuilu.

Adults feed on fallen fruit.

== Subspecies ==
- Bebearia eliensis eliensis (southern Cameroon, Gabon, Congo, Central African Republic, Democratic Republic of the Congo: Cataractes and Equateur)
- Bebearia eliensis scrutata Hecq, 1989 (Nigeria, western Cameroon)
- Bebearia eliensis unita (Capronnier, 1889) (Democratic Republic of the Congo: central basin)
