= Uranothauma frederikkae =

Scientific classification
- Domain: Eukaryota
- Kingdom: Animalia
- Phylum: Arthropoda
- Class: Insecta
- Order: Lepidoptera
- Family: Lycaenidae
- Genus: Uranothauma
- Species: U. frederikkae

Binomial name
- Uranothauma frederikkae Libert, 1993

Species of butterfly

Uranothauma frederikkae, the Cameroon branded blue, is a butterfly in the family Lycaenidae. It is found in Nigeria and Cameroon. The habitat consists of submontane forests at altitudes above 1,300 meters.

== Subspecies ==
- Uranothauma frederikkae frederikkae (Nigeria, Cameroon)
- Uranothauma frederikkae manengoubensis Libert, 1993 (Cameroon)
