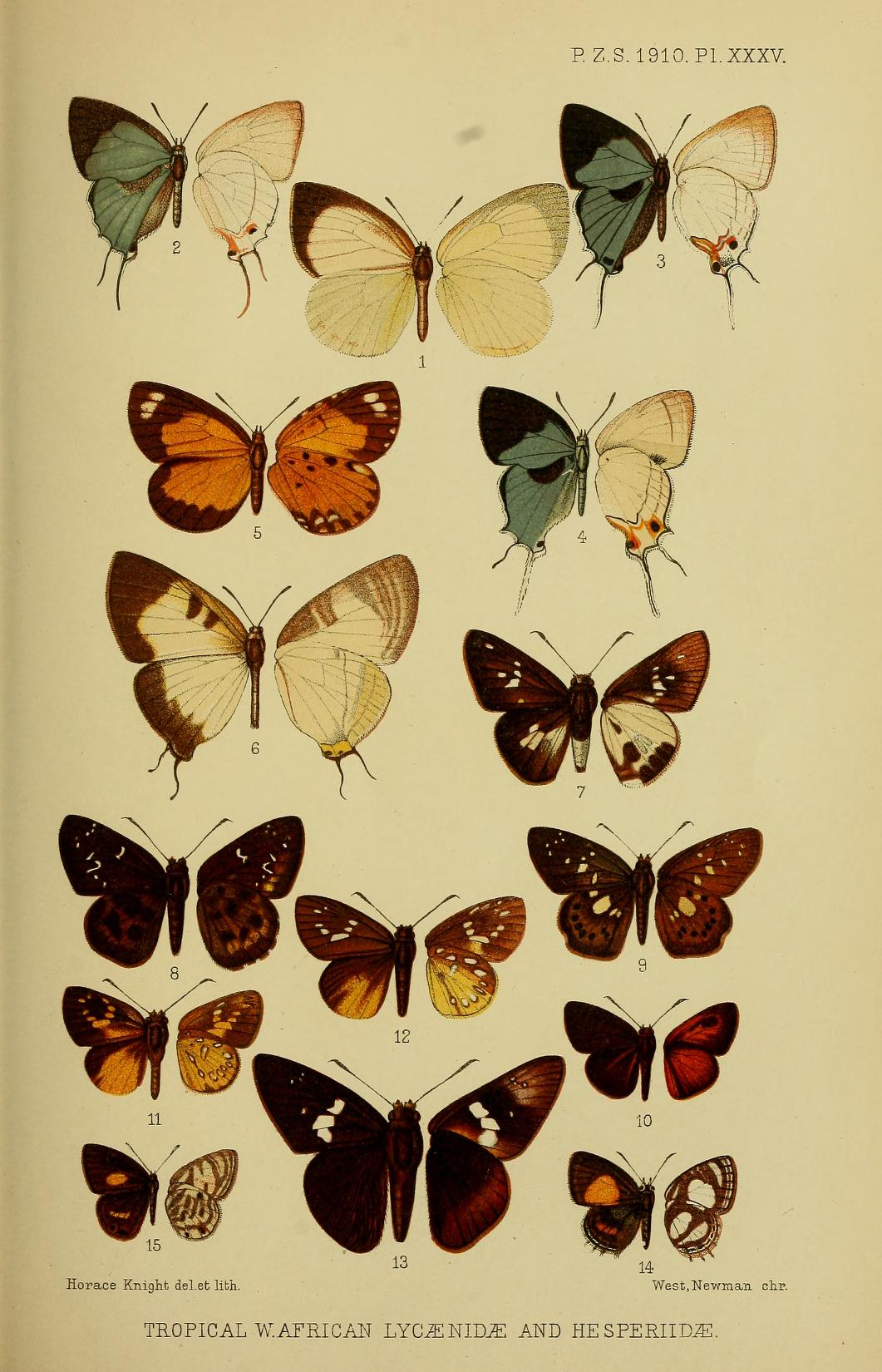
- Figure 15

Scientific classification
- Domain: Eukaryota
- Kingdom: Animalia
- Phylum: Arthropoda
- Class: Insecta
- Order: Lepidoptera
- Family: Lycaenidae
- Genus: Anthene
- Species: A. versatilis

Binomial name
- Anthene versatilis (Bethune-Baker, 1910)

Synonyms
- Lycaenesthes versatilis Bethune-Baker, 1910; Anthene (Anthene) versatilis; Lycaenesthes bitje Druce, 1910

= Anthene versatilis =

Versatile ciliate blue

Species of butterfly

Anthene versatilis, the versatile ciliate blue, is a butterfly in the family Lycaenidae. It is found in Nigeria, Cameroon, Gabon and the Democratic Republic of the Congo. The habitat consists of primary forests.

== Subspecies ==
- Anthene versatilis versatilis (Cameroon, Gabon, Democratic Republic of the Congo)
- Anthene versatilis bitje (Druce, 1910) (Nigeria: south and the Cross River loop, Cameroon)
