= Bebearia subtentyris =

Scientific classification
- Kingdom: Animalia
- Phylum: Arthropoda
- Class: Insecta
- Order: Lepidoptera
- Family: Nymphalidae
- Genus: Bebearia
- Species: B. subtentyris

Binomial name
- Bebearia subtentyris (Strand, 1912)

Synonyms
- Euryphene subtentyris Strand, 1912; Bebearia (Apectinaria) subtentyris; Bebearia tentyris subtentyris

Species of butterfly

Bebearia subtentyris, the upland plain forester, is a butterfly in the family Nymphalidae. It is found in Cameroon. The habitat consists of sub-montane forests.

“Nearly allied to tentyris Hew., but characterized inter alia by the faint bluish violet reflections present only in the dorsal area of the forewing; the species further differs from tentyris as follows: colouring of the upper surface darker, in the costal area of the forewing no bluish reflections at all, on the other hand with these reflections on the entire hindwing excepting its dorsal area; the rows of black spots on the forewing are of uniform distinctness to the hindmargin; on the hindwing the whole basal area is suffused with blackish.” Cameroons.

== Subspecies ==
- Bebearia subtentyris subtentyris (western Cameroon)
- Bebearia subtentyris phoebeensis Hecq, 1996 (Cameroon)
