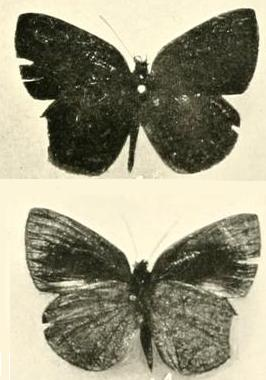

Scientific classification
- Kingdom: Animalia
- Phylum: Arthropoda
- Class: Insecta
- Order: Lepidoptera
- Family: Lycaenidae
- Genus: Cephetola
- Species: C. mercedes

Binomial name
- Cephetola mercedes (Suffert, 1904)

Synonyms
- Epitola mercedes Suffert, 1904; Epitola ivoriensis Jackson, 1967

= Cephetola mercedes =

Species of butterfly

Cephetola mercedes is a butterfly in the family Lycaenidae. It is found in Ivory Coast, Ghana, Nigeria and Cameroon. Its habitat consists of forests.

== Subspecies ==
- Cephetola mercedes mercedes (Nigeria: south and Cross River loop, western Cameroon)
- Cephetola mercedes dejeani Libert, 1999 (central Cameroon)
- Cephetola mercedes ivoriensis (Jackson, 1967) (Ivory Coast, Ghana)
