= Torbenia stempfferi =

Scientific classification
- Kingdom: Animalia
- Phylum: Arthropoda
- Class: Insecta
- Order: Lepidoptera
- Family: Lycaenidae
- Genus: Torbenia
- Species: T. stempfferi

Binomial name
- Torbenia stempfferi (Collins & Larsen, 2000)

Synonyms
- Ornipholidotos stempfferi Collins & Larsen, 2000

Species of butterfly

Torbenia stempfferi is a butterfly in the family Lycaenidae. It is found in Cameroon, the Republic of the Congo and the Democratic Republic of the Congo.

== Subspecies ==
- Torbenia stempfferi stempfferi (Cameroon)
- Torbenia stempfferi littoralis Collins & Larsen, 2000 (Cameroon)
- Torbenia stempfferi cuypersi Libert, 2005 (Cameroon, Congo, Democratic Republic of the Congo)
