= Euphaedra proserpina =

Scientific classification
- Kingdom: Animalia
- Phylum: Arthropoda
- Class: Insecta
- Order: Lepidoptera
- Family: Nymphalidae
- Genus: Euphaedra
- Species: E. proserpina

Binomial name
- Euphaedra proserpina Hecq, 1983

Synonyms
- Euphaedra (Euphaedrana) proserpina; Euphaedra tisiphona Hecq, 1983

Species of butterfly

Euphaedra proserpina, the splendid Ceres forester, is a butterfly in the family Nymphalidae. It is found in Nigeria and Cameroon. The habitat consists of wetter forests.

== Subspecies ==
- Euphaedra proserpina proserpina (Nigeria, western Cameroon)
- Euphaedra proserpina tisiphona Hecq, 1983 (Cameroon)
