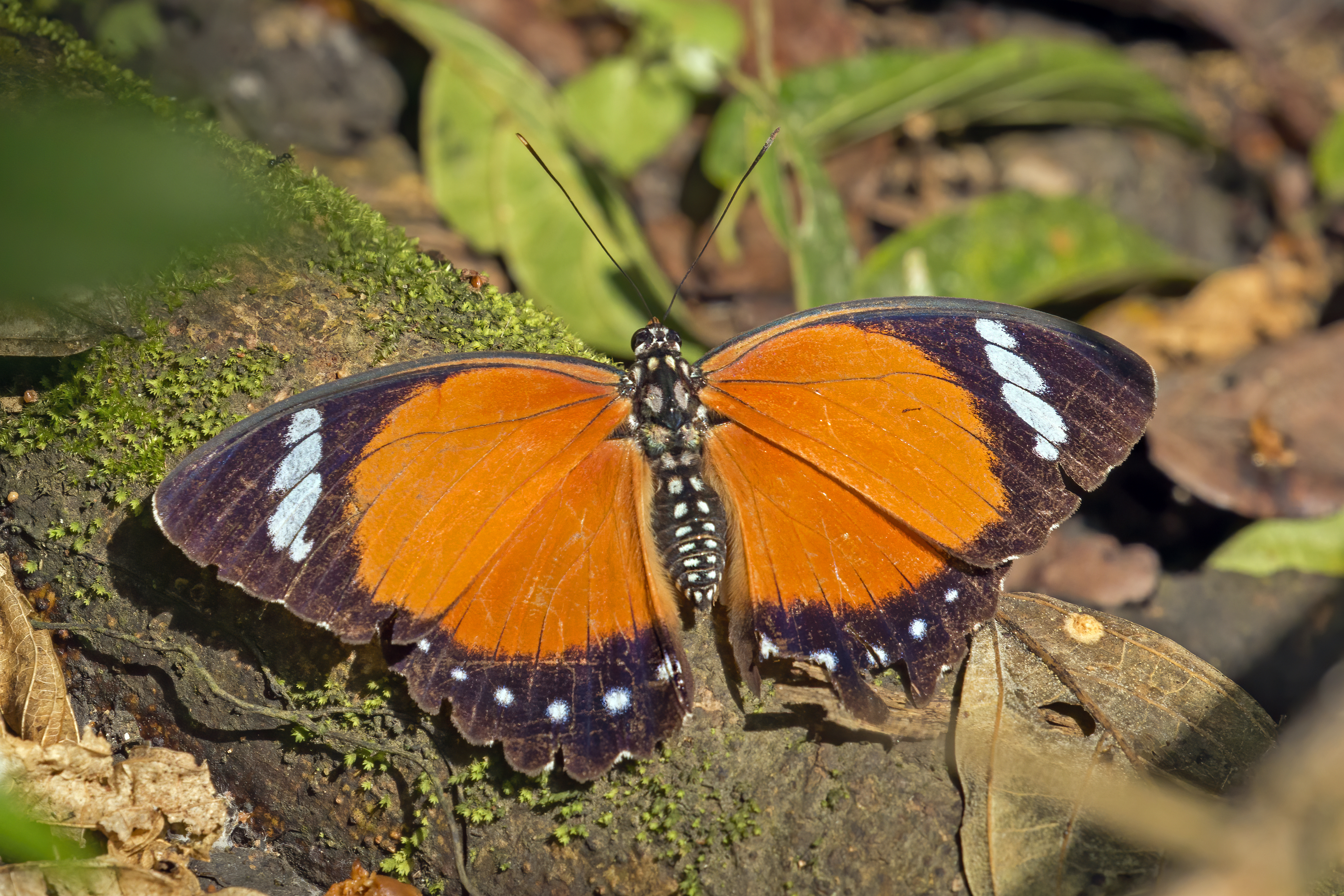
- Female, Kibale Forest, Uganda

Scientific classification
- Kingdom: Animalia
- Phylum: Arthropoda
- Class: Insecta
- Order: Lepidoptera
- Family: Nymphalidae
- Genus: Euphaedra
- Species: E. alacris

Binomial name
- Euphaedra alacris Hecq, 1978

Synonyms
- Euphaedra (Euphaedrana) alacris

= Euphaedra alacris =

Species of butterfly

Euphaedra alacris is a butterfly in the family Nymphalidae. It is found from Cameroon to the Democratic Republic of the Congo and in Uganda and western Tanzania. The habitat consists of dense forests.

The larvae possibly feed on Sapindaceae species.

== Gallery ==
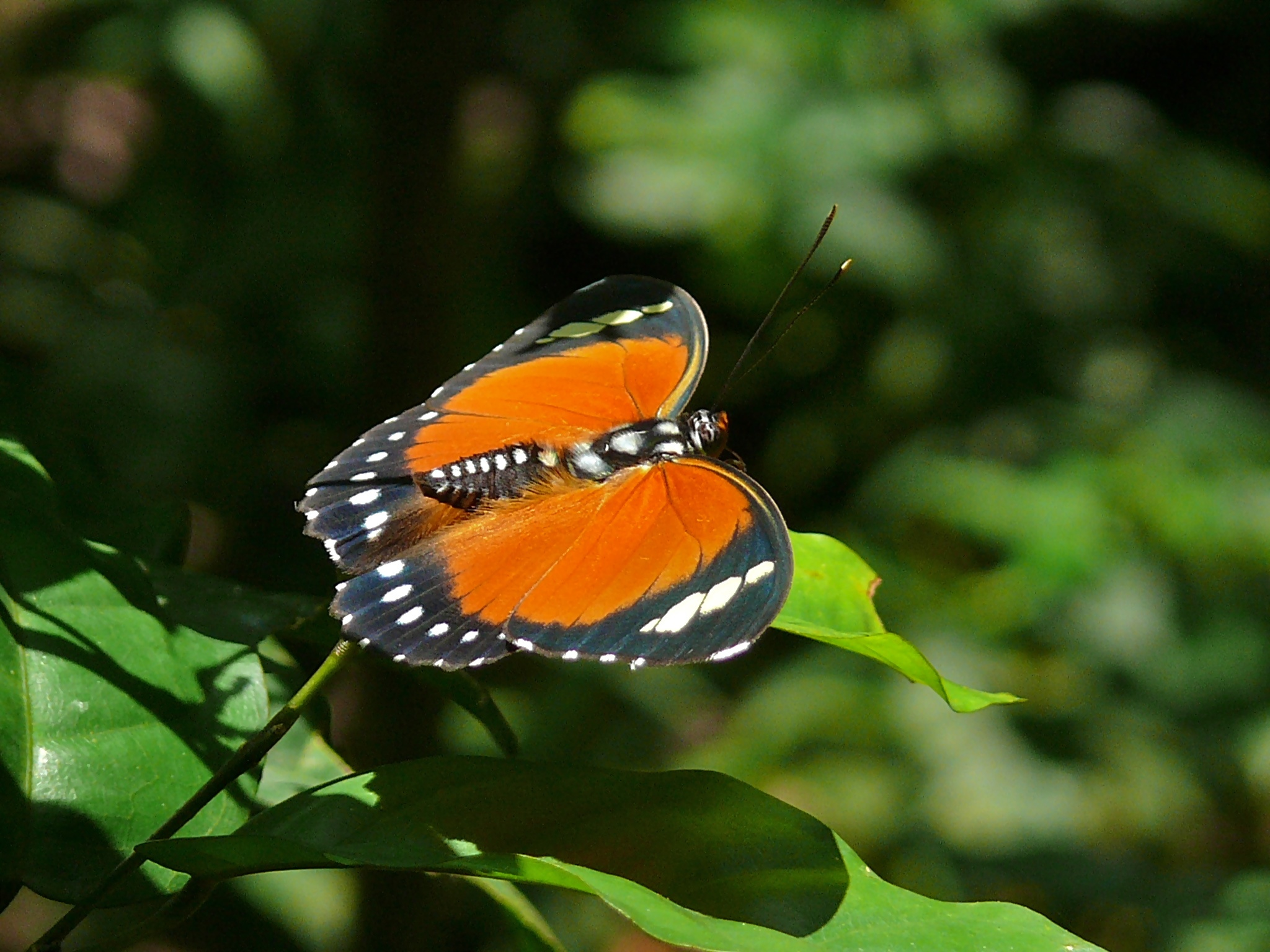
Kibale Forest, Uganda

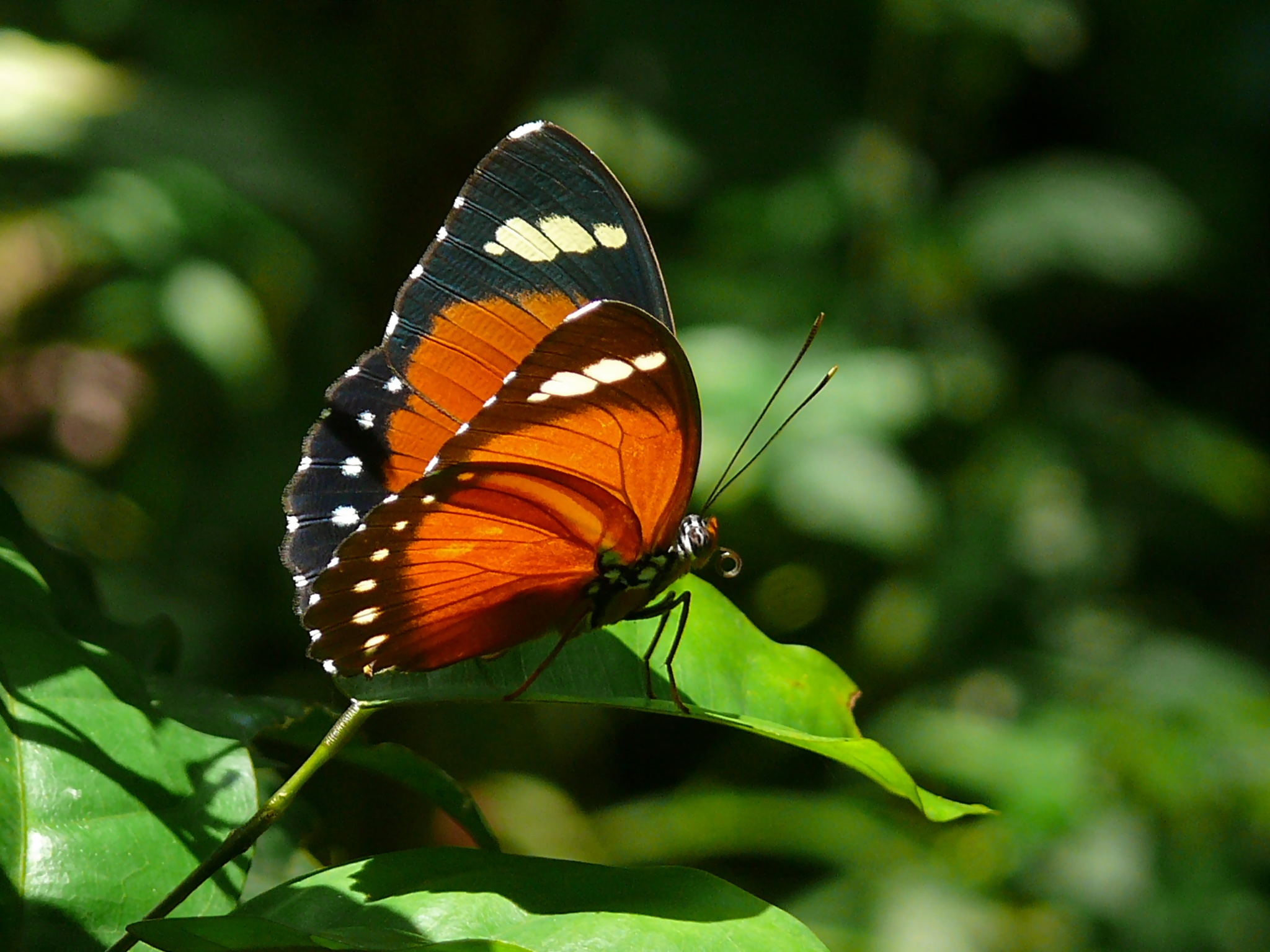
Kibale Forest

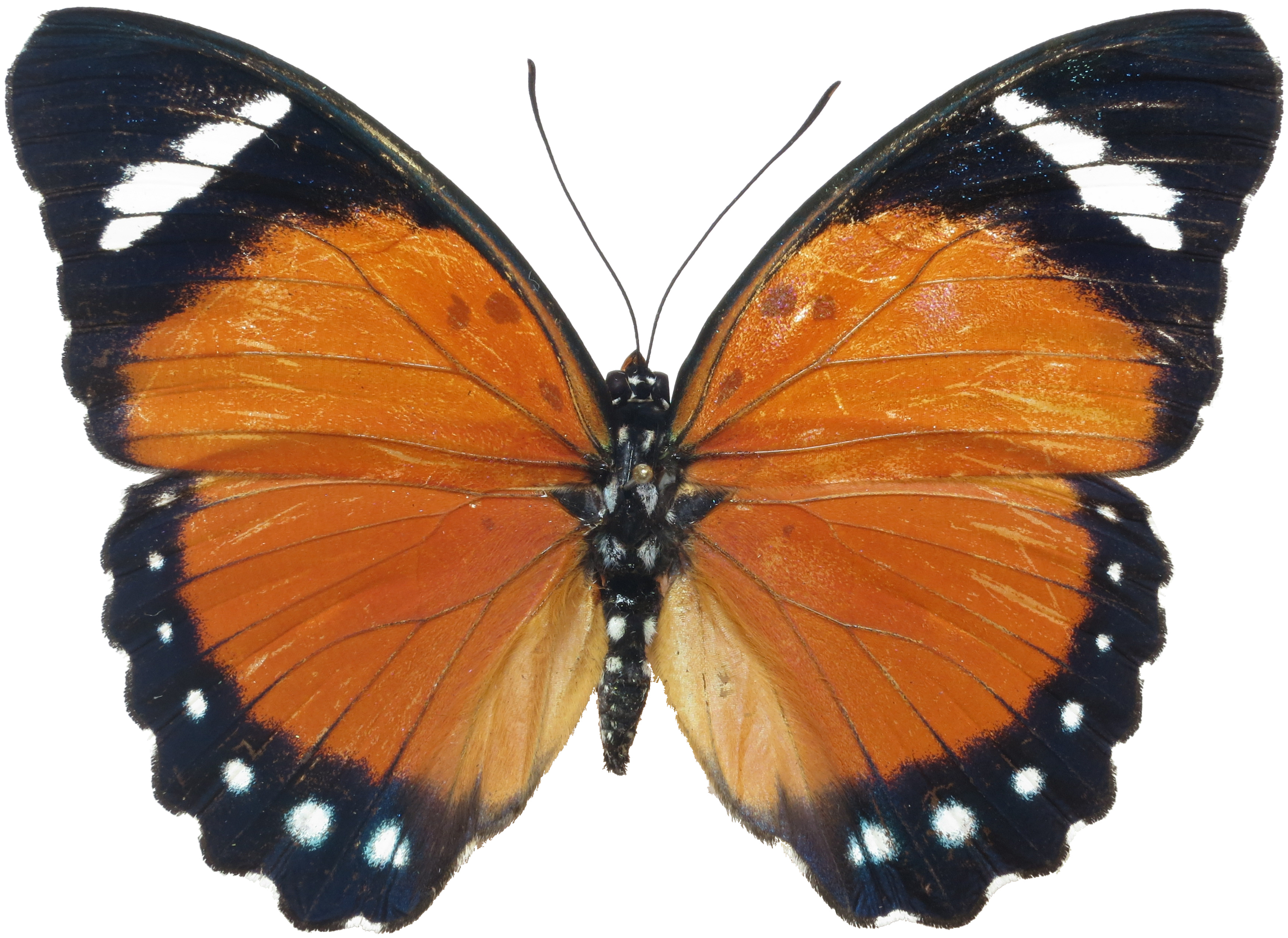
female specimen
