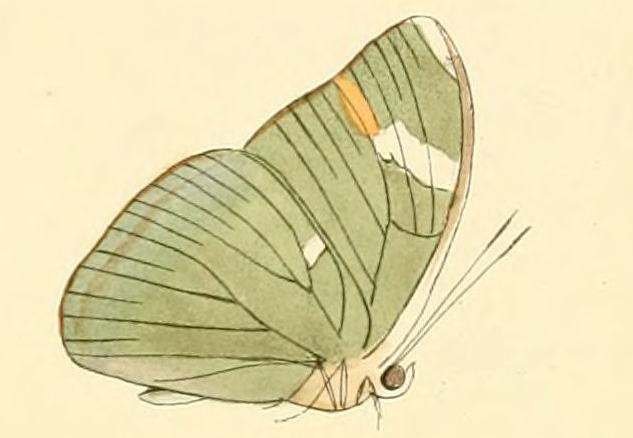

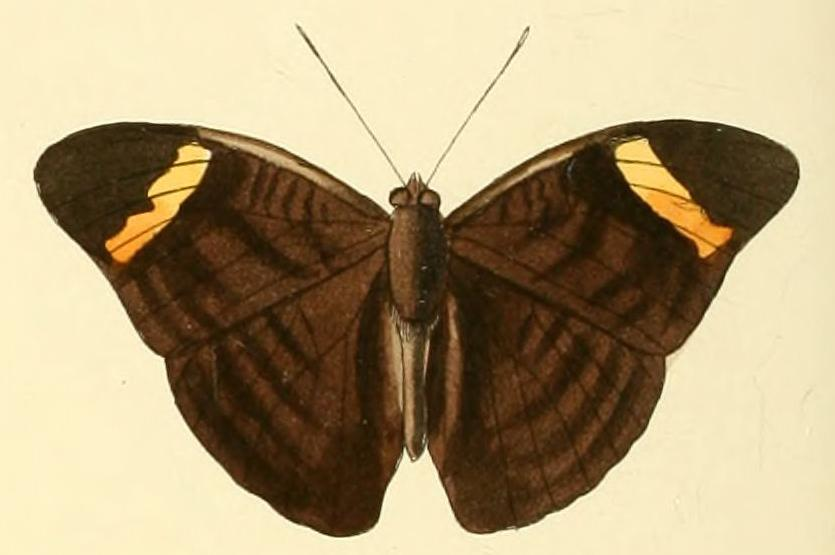

Scientific classification
- Kingdom: Animalia
- Phylum: Arthropoda
- Class: Insecta
- Order: Lepidoptera
- Family: Nymphalidae
- Genus: Bebearia
- Species: B. phantasia

Binomial name
- Bebearia phantasia (Hewitson, 1865)

Synonyms
- Euryphene phantasia Hewitson, 1865; Bebearia (Bebearia) phantasia

= Bebearia phantasia =

Species of butterfly

Bebearia phantasia, the fantasia, is a butterfly in the family Nymphalidae. It is found in Nigeria, Cameroon, Gabon, the Republic of the Congo and the Democratic Republic of the Congo. The habitat consists of primary forests

The forewing beneath is uniform green, not darker at the distal margin and without dark markings.

The larvae feed on an unidentified dicotyledonous creeper.

== Subspecies ==
- Bebearia phantasia phantasia (southern Nigeria, western Cameroon)
- Bebearia phantasia concolor Hecq, 1988 (southern Cameroon, Gabon, Congo, western Democratic Republic of the Congo)
