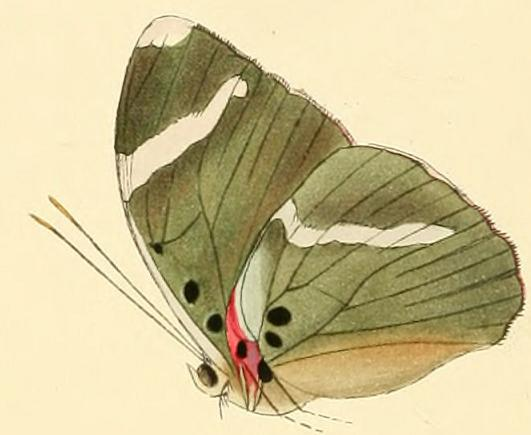

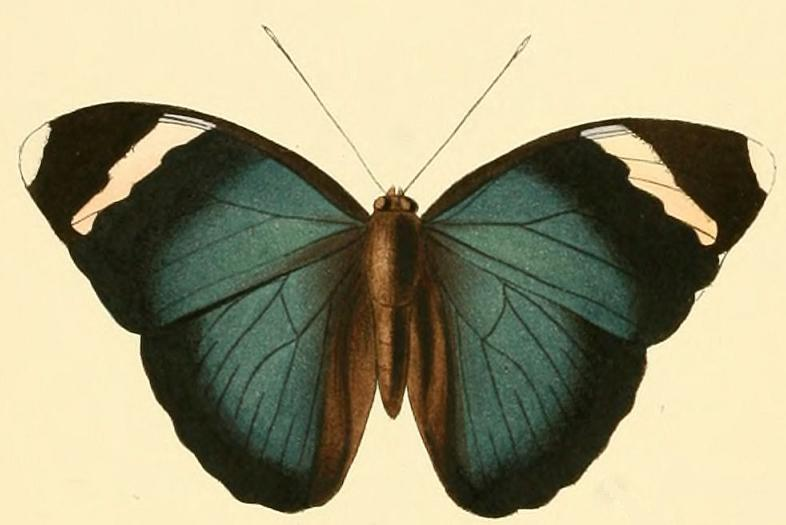

Scientific classification
- Kingdom: Animalia
- Phylum: Arthropoda
- Class: Insecta
- Order: Lepidoptera
- Family: Nymphalidae
- Genus: Euphaedra
- Species: E. luperca

Binomial name
- Euphaedra luperca (Hewitson, 1864)

Synonyms
- Romalaeosoma luperca Hewitson, 1864; Euphaedra (Proteuphaedra) luperca

= Euphaedra luperca =

Species of butterfly

Euphaedra luperca, the Nigerian blue forester, is a butterfly in the family Nymphalidae. It is found in southern Nigeria and western Cameroon.

== Description ==
E. luperca Hew. In the male the wings are blackish above, in the basal part of the forewing to vein 2 and at the hindmargin nearly to the anal angle dark greenish blue and on the hindwing except at the costal and inner margins with a greenish blue reflection almost to the distal margin; the subapical band of the forewing is white or light yellow (= ab. luteofasciaia Bartel ), with an almost uniform breadth of about 3 mm., quite straight, and nearly reaching the distal margin at vein 4, also forming a small spot in cellule 3. The under surface is lighter or darker green, at the hindmargin of the forewing dark violet-brown and at the inner margin of the hindwing yellow-haired as far as vein 2; the forewing with three black spots placed in a straight line, two in the cell, ringed with light green, and the third at its apex; the hindwing likewise with three black spots, one just at the base in cellule 8 and two in the cell; on the forewing the costal margin to the apical band, the band itself and the apical spot are pure white; on the hindwing the base of the costal margin is blood-red and posteriorly bounded by a snow-white stripe, which follows vein 8 and somewhat beyond the middle of the costal margin unites with a white transverse band; this transverse band is feebly curved basewards and reaches vein 4 or 3 not far from the distal margin. In these beautiful markings the under surface of this species differs from all others. The typical female is unknown to me and has never been described, but perhaps differs but little from the male. Old Calabar to the Congo -ab. variegata ab. nov. only differs in having the hindwing above to beyond the middle and the forewing in the basal part of cellules 1-2 dark olive-brown without blue reflection; the blue colour is consequently confined to the broad marginal band of the hindwing and the hinder angle of the forewing; the subapical band of the forewing is brighter yellow than in the type-form. Intermediate forms occur is which the blue colour is more extended. Congo.

== Biology ==
The habitat consists of forests.
