= List of former species in the genus Papilio =

This is a list of former species in the butterfly genus Papilio, with the current species name.

Selected former species include:

== A ==
- P. accius Smith, 1797 - transferred to Lerema accius (Smith, 1797)
- P. aracinthus Fabricius, 1777 - synonymized with Heteropterus morpheus (Pallas, 1771)
- P. asychis Stoll, [1780] - transferred to Chiothion asychis (Stoll, [1780])

== B ==
- P. broteas Cramer, 1780 - transferred to Nascus busirus (Cramer, 1780)
- P. busirus Cramer, [1779] - transferred to Achlyodes busirus (Cramer, [1779])

== C ==
- P. cebrenus Cramer, 1777 - transferred to Euriphellus cebrenus (Cramer, 1777)
- P. comma Linnaeus, 1758 - transferred to Hesperia comma (Linnaeus, 1758)
- P. coridon Fabricius, 1775 - synonymized with Perichares philetes (Gmelin, [1790])

== E ==
- P. edipus Stoll, [1781] - transferred to Pardaleodes edipus (Stoll, [1781])
- P. eligius Stoll, [1781] - transferred to Celaenorrhinus eligius (Stoll, [1781])
- P. ethlius Stoll, 1782 - transferred to Calpodes ethlius (Stoll, 1782)
- P. euribates Stoll, 1782 - transferred to Euriphellus euribates (Stoll, 1782)

== F ==
- P. flesus Stoll, [1790] - transferred to Tagiades flesus (Fabricius, 1781])
- P. folus Cramer, 1775 - transferred to Udaspes folus (Cramer, 1775)

== H ==
- P. helirius Cramer, 1775 - transferred to Chaetocneme helirius (Cramer, 1775)
- P. hylaspes Stoll, 1781 - transferred to Synale folus (Stoll, 1781)

== J ==
- P. japetus Stoll, [1781] - transferred to Tagiades japetus (Stoll, [1781])
- P. jolus Stoll, [1782] - transferred to Carystus jolus (Stoll, [1782])
- P. jovianus Stoll, 1782 - transferred to Pythonides jovianus (Stoll, 1782)

== M ==
- P. menes Stoll, 1782 - transferred to Apaustus menes (Stoll, 1782)
- P. midas Cramer, 1775 - transferred to Bungalotis midas (Cramer, 1775)
- P. metis Linnaeus, 1764 - transferred to Metisella metis (Linnaeus, 1764)
- P. morpheus Pallas, 1771 - transferred to Heteropterus morpheus (Pallas, 1771)

== N ==
- P. nothus Fabricius, 1787 - transferred to Ceratrichia nothus (Fabricius, 1787)

== O ==
- P. ophion Stoll, [1790] - synonymized with Tagiades flesus (Fabricius, 1781])
- P. orchamus Cramer, [1777] - transferred to Xeniades orchamus (Cramer, [1777])

== P ==
- P. paulliniae Sepp, [1842] - transferred to Nascus paulliniae (Sepp, [1842])
- P. pertinax Stoll, [1781] - transferred to Phlebodes pertinax (Stoll, [1781])
- P. phidon Cramer, 1779 - transferred to Thracides phidon (Cramer, 1779)
- P. philetes Gmelin, [1790] - transferred to Perichares philetes (Gmelin, [1790])
- P. phocaeus Cramer, 1777 - transferred to Ceratrichia phocion (Fabricius, 1781)
- P. phocion Fabricius, 1781 - synonymyized to Ceratrichia phocion (Fabricius, 1781)
- P. phocus Cramer, 1777 - transferred to Nascus phocus (Cramer, [1777])
- P. phyllus Cramer, [1777] - transferred to Vettius phyllus (Cramer, [1777])

== S ==
- P. salatis Stoll, 1782 - transferred to Salatis salatis (Stoll, 1782)
- P. salius Cramer, 1775 - transferred to Calpodes salius (Cramer, 1775)
- P. saturnus Fabricius, 1787 - transferred to Saturnus saturnus (Fabricius, 1787)
- P. sebaldus Stoll, 1781 - transferred to Dyscophellus sebaldus (Stoll, 1781)

== T ==
- P. tryxus Stoll, 1780 - transferred to Xenophanes tryxus (Stoll, 1780)

== V ==
- P. virbius Cramer, 1777 - transferred to Cobalus virbius (Cramer, 1777)
