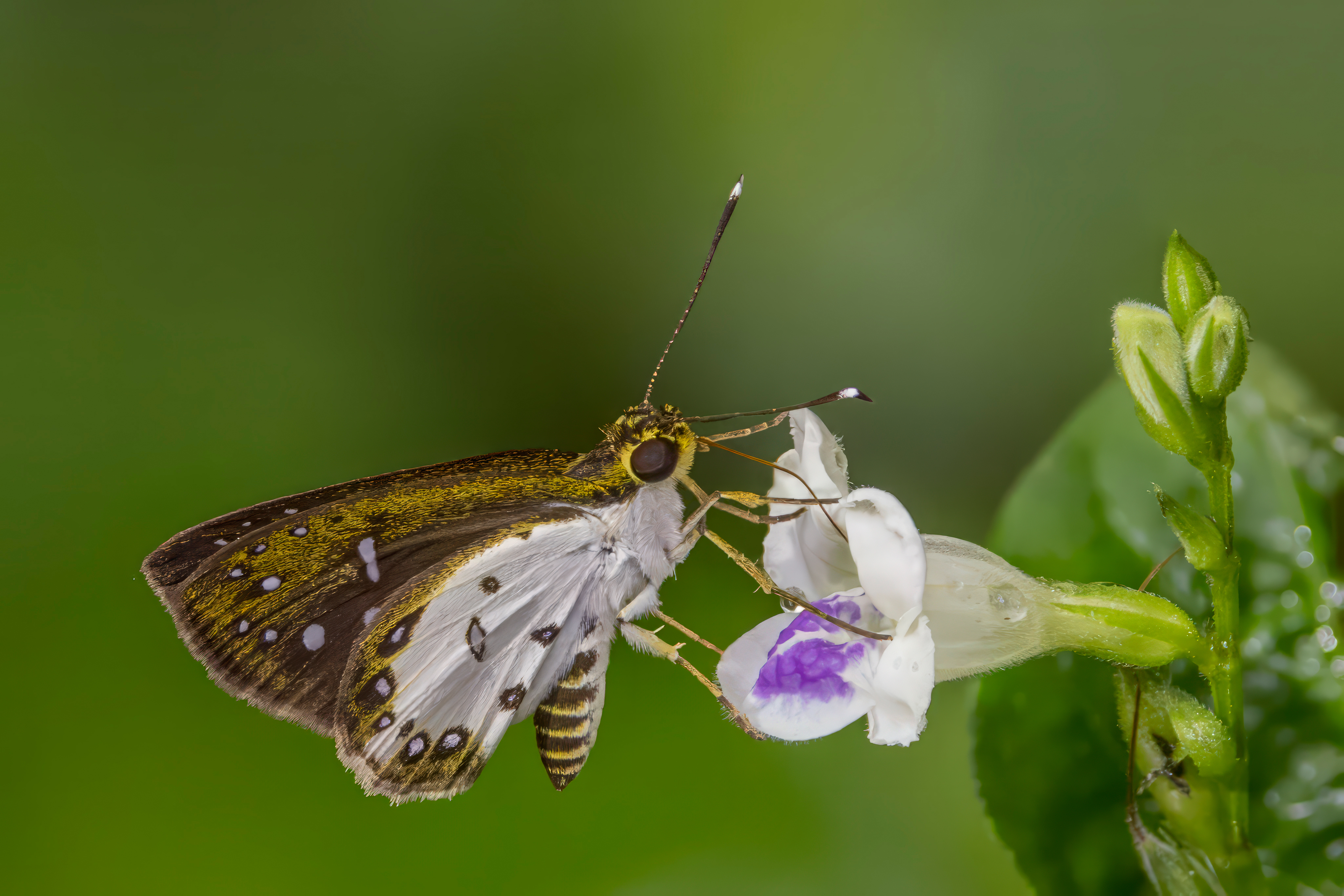
- C. nothus in Ghana

Scientific classification
- Kingdom: Animalia
- Phylum: Arthropoda
- Class: Insecta
- Order: Lepidoptera
- Family: Hesperiidae
- Tribe: Ceratrichiini
- Genus: Ceratrichia; Butler, 1869

= Ceratrichia =

Genus of butterflies

Ceratrichia is a genus of skipper butterflies in the family Hesperiidae. They are found in the Afrotropical realm.

== Species ==
- Ceratrichia brunnea Bethune-Baker, 1906
- Ceratrichia clara Riley, 1925
- Ceratrichia crowleyi Riley, 1925
- Ceratrichia flandria Evans, 1956
- Ceratrichia flava Hewitson, 1878
- Ceratrichia hollandi Bethune-Baker, 1908
- Ceratrichia lewisi Collins & Larsen, 2000
- Ceratrichia nothus (Fabricius, 1787)
- Ceratrichia phocion (Fabricius, 1781)
- Ceratrichia punctata Holland, 1896
- Ceratrichia semlikensis Joicey & Talbot, 1921
- Ceratrichia weberi Miller, 1964
- Ceratrichia wollastoni Heron, 1909

=== Former species ===
- Ceratrichia argyrosticta Plötz, 1879 - transferred to Argemma argyrosticta (Plötz, 1879)
- Ceratrichia aurea Druce, 1910 - transferred to Argemma aurea (Druce, 1910)
- Ceratrichia bonga Evans, 1946 - transferred to Argemma bonga (Evans, 1946)
- Ceratrichia mabirensis Riley, 1925 - transferred to Argemma mabirensis (Riley, 1925)
- Ceratrichia maesseni Miller, 1971 - transferred to Argemma maesseni (Miller, 1971)
- Ceratrichia semilutea Mabille, 1891 - transferred to Ceratricula semilutea (Mabille, 1891)
- Ceratrichia stellata Mabille, 1891 - transferred to Dotta stellata (Mabille, 1891)
