= Ceratrichia weberi =

Scientific classification
- Kingdom: Animalia
- Phylum: Arthropoda
- Class: Insecta
- Order: Lepidoptera
- Family: Hesperiidae
- Genus: Ceratrichia
- Species: C. weberi

Binomial name
- Ceratrichia weberi Miller, 1964

Species of butterfly

Ceratrichia weberi is a species of butterfly in the family Hesperiidae. It is found in Cameroon. The habitat consists of forests.
