= Ceratrichia clara =

Clear forest sylph

Scientific classification
- Kingdom: Animalia
- Phylum: Arthropoda
- Clade: Pancrustacea
- Class: Insecta
- Order: Lepidoptera
- Family: Hesperiidae
- Genus: Ceratrichia
- Species: C. clara

Binomial name
- Ceratrichia clara Riley, 1925

Synonyms
- Ceratrichia hollandi f. clara Riley, 1925; Ceratrichia hollandi clara Evans, 1937; Ceratrichia hollandi medea Evans, 1937

Species of butterfly

Ceratrichia clara, commonly known as the clear forest sylph, is a species of butterfly in the family Hesperiidae. It is found in Guinea, Ivory Coast, Ghana, Nigeria, Cameroon, Equatorial Guinea, Gabon, the Republic of the Congo, the Democratic Republic of the Congo, Uganda and Tanzania. The habitat consists of forests.

== Subspecies ==
- Ceratrichia clara clara (Guinea, Ivory Coast, Ghana, Nigeria, western Cameroon)
- Ceratrichia clara medea Evans, 1937 (Cameroon: except west, Equatorial Guinea: Bioko, Gabon, Congo, Democratic Republic of the Congo, Uganda, north-western Tanzania)
