= Ceratrichia lewisi =

Scientific classification
- Kingdom: Animalia
- Phylum: Arthropoda
- Clade: Pancrustacea
- Class: Insecta
- Order: Lepidoptera
- Family: Hesperiidae
- Genus: Ceratrichia
- Species: C. lewisi

Binomial name
- Ceratrichia lewisi Collins & Larsen, 2000

Species of butterfly

Ceratrichia lewisi, commonly known as the Obudu forest sylph, is a species of butterfly in the family Hesperiidae. It is found in Nigeria (the Obudu Plateau). The habitat consists of forests.
