= Ceratrichia hollandi =

Scientific classification
- Kingdom: Animalia
- Phylum: Arthropoda
- Class: Insecta
- Order: Lepidoptera
- Family: Hesperiidae
- Genus: Ceratrichia
- Species: C. hollandi

Binomial name
- Ceratrichia hollandi Bethune-Baker, 1908

Species of butterfly

Ceratrichia hollandi is a species of butterfly in the family Hesperiidae. It is found in the Democratic Republic of the Congo, Uganda, western Kenya and north-western Tanzania. The habitat consists of forests.
