= Ceratrichia wollastoni =

Scientific classification
- Kingdom: Animalia
- Phylum: Arthropoda
- Class: Insecta
- Order: Lepidoptera
- Family: Hesperiidae
- Genus: Ceratrichia
- Species: C. wollastoni

Binomial name
- Ceratrichia wollastoni Heron, 1909

Synonyms
- Ceratrichia flava f. extensa Aurivillius, 1925; Ceratrichia wollastoni extensa Evans, 1937; Ceratrichia flava f. mariae Dufrane, 1945

Species of butterfly

Ceratrichia wollastoni is a species of butterfly in the family Hesperiidae. It is found in Cameroon, the Republic of the Congo, the Democratic Republic of the Congo, Uganda, western Kenya and north-western Tanzania. The habitat consists of forests.
