= Ceratrichia flandria =

Scientific classification
- Kingdom: Animalia
- Phylum: Arthropoda
- Class: Insecta
- Order: Lepidoptera
- Family: Hesperiidae
- Genus: Ceratrichia
- Species: C. flandria

Binomial name
- Ceratrichia flandria Evans, 1956

Species of butterfly

Ceratrichia flandria is a species of butterfly in the family Hesperiidae. It is found in the Democratic Republic of the Congo (Équateur). The habitat consists of forests.
