= Ceratrichia punctata =

Scientific classification
- Kingdom: Animalia
- Phylum: Arthropoda
- Class: Insecta
- Order: Lepidoptera
- Family: Hesperiidae
- Genus: Ceratrichia
- Species: C. punctata

Binomial name
- Ceratrichia punctata Holland, 1896

Species of butterfly

Ceratrichia punctata is a species of butterfly in the family Hesperiidae. It is found in Cameroon and Angola. The habitat consists of forests.
