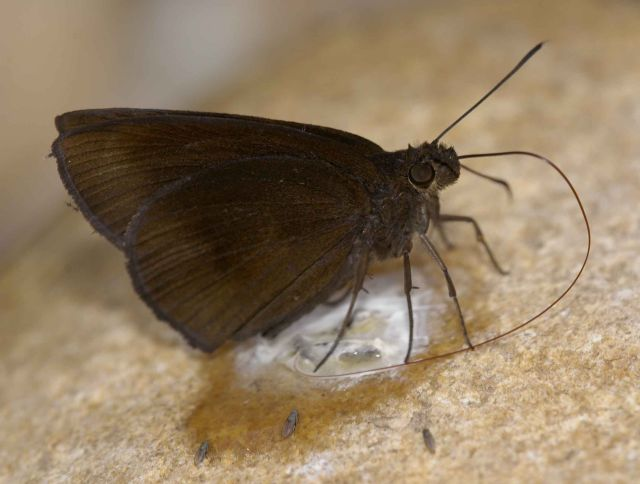

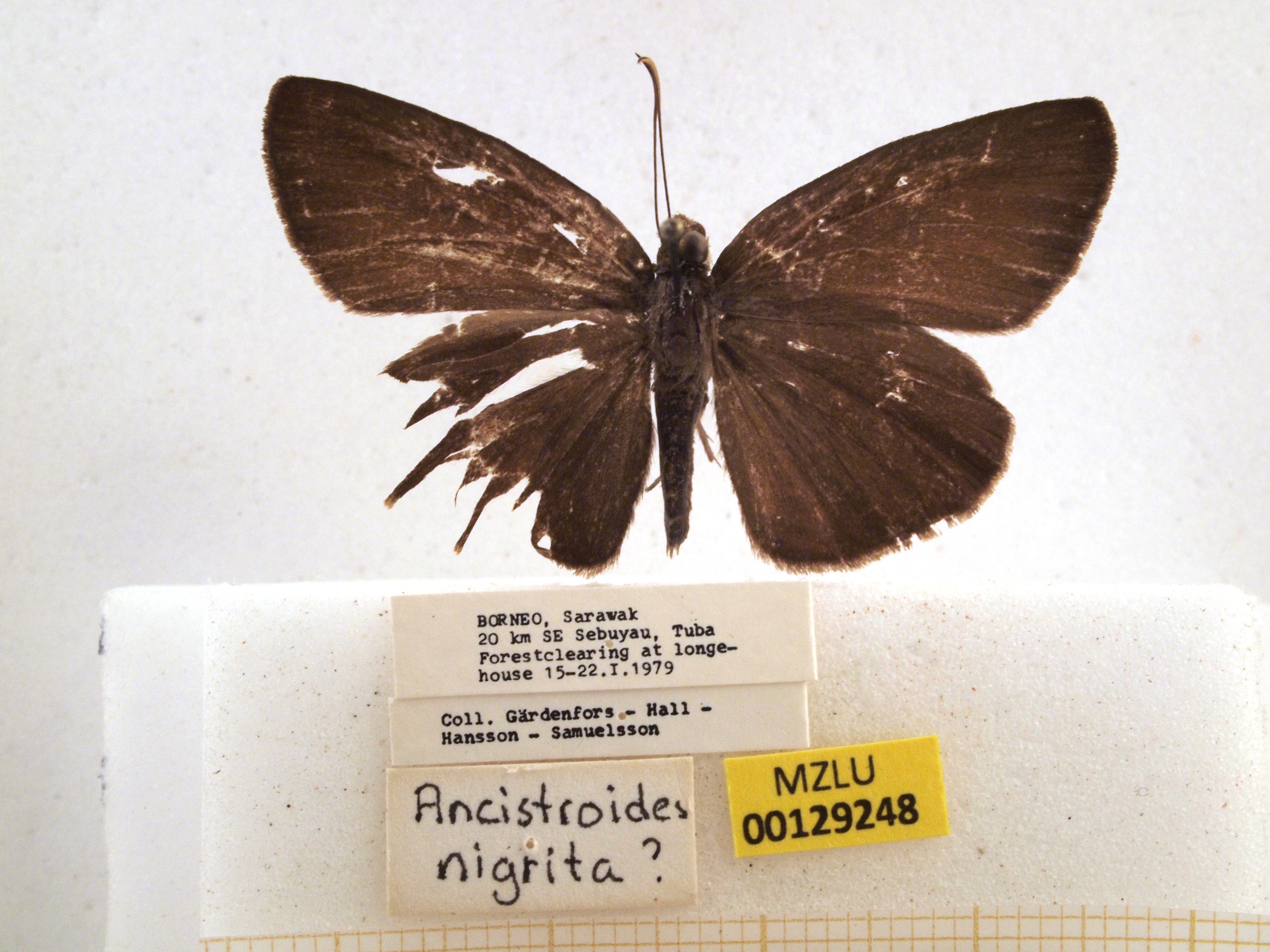

Scientific classification
- Kingdom: Animalia
- Phylum: Arthropoda
- Class: Insecta
- Order: Lepidoptera
- Family: Hesperiidae
- Genus: Ancistroides
- Species: A. nigrita

Binomial name
- Ancistroides nigrita (Latreille, 1824)

= Ancistroides nigrita =

Chocolate demon

Species of butterfly

Ancistroides nigrita, the chocolate demon, is a butterfly belonging to the family Hesperiidae.

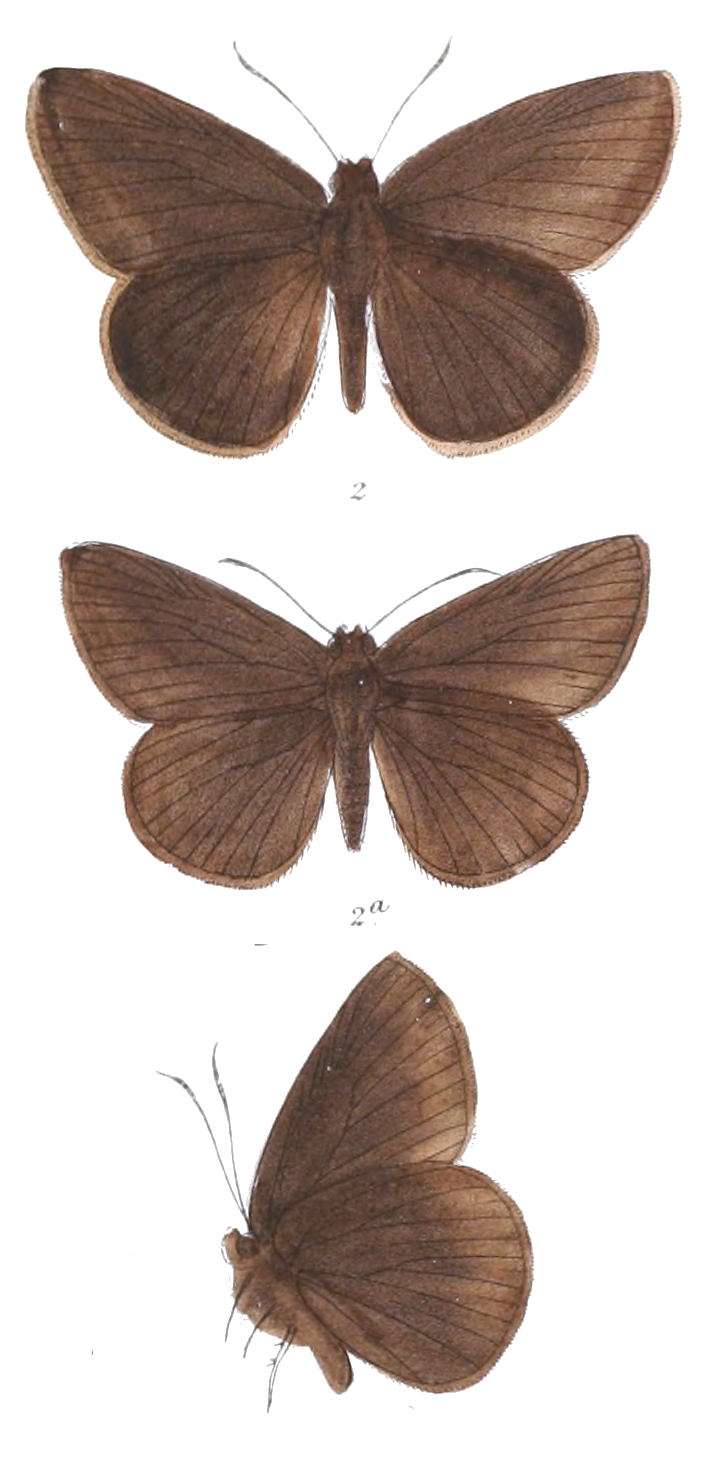

It is found in

India, Indochina, Sumatra, Java, Malaya, the Philippines

== Subspecies ==
The subspecies of Ancistroides nigrita found in India are-

- Ancistroides nigrita diocles Moore, 1865 – (Bengal Chocolate Demon) Sikkim which is also found in Burma, Thailand, Laos, Vietnam, Hainan and Yunnan.

== Description ==
Both the upperside and underside of the wings are uniform dark brown or olive-brown. The marginal areas on the underside are sometimes a paler brown than the ground colour.
