= Ceratrichia semlikensis =

Scientific classification
- Kingdom: Animalia
- Phylum: Arthropoda
- Class: Insecta
- Order: Lepidoptera
- Family: Hesperiidae
- Genus: Ceratrichia
- Species: C. semlikensis

Binomial name
- Ceratrichia semlikensis Joicey & Talbot, 1921

Synonyms
- Ceratrichia flava semlikensis Joicey & Talbot, 1921; Ceratrichia flava f. rebeli Dufrane, 1945

Species of butterfly

Ceratrichia semlikensis is a species of butterfly in the family Hesperiidae. It is found in the Republic of the Congo, the central part of the Democratic Republic of the Congo, the Central African Republic, Uganda, western Kenya, Tanzania and north-western Zambia. Their habitat consists of forests.

The larvae feed on Isachne mauritiana.
