= Ceratrichia brunnea =

Scientific classification
- Kingdom: Animalia
- Phylum: Arthropoda
- Class: Insecta
- Order: Lepidoptera
- Family: Hesperiidae
- Genus: Ceratrichia
- Species: C. brunnea

Binomial name
- Ceratrichia brunnea Bethune-Baker, 1906

Synonyms
- Ceratrichia ialemia Druce, 1909

Species of butterfly

Ceratrichia brunnea is a species of butterfly in the family Hesperiidae. It is found in Cameroon, the Democratic Republic of the Congo, Uganda, Kenya and Tanzania. The habitat consists of forests.

== Subspecies ==
- Ceratrichia brunnea brunnea (Democratic Republic of the Congo, Uganda, western Kenya, north-western Tanzania)
- Ceratrichia brunnea ialemia Druce, 1909 (Cameroon)
