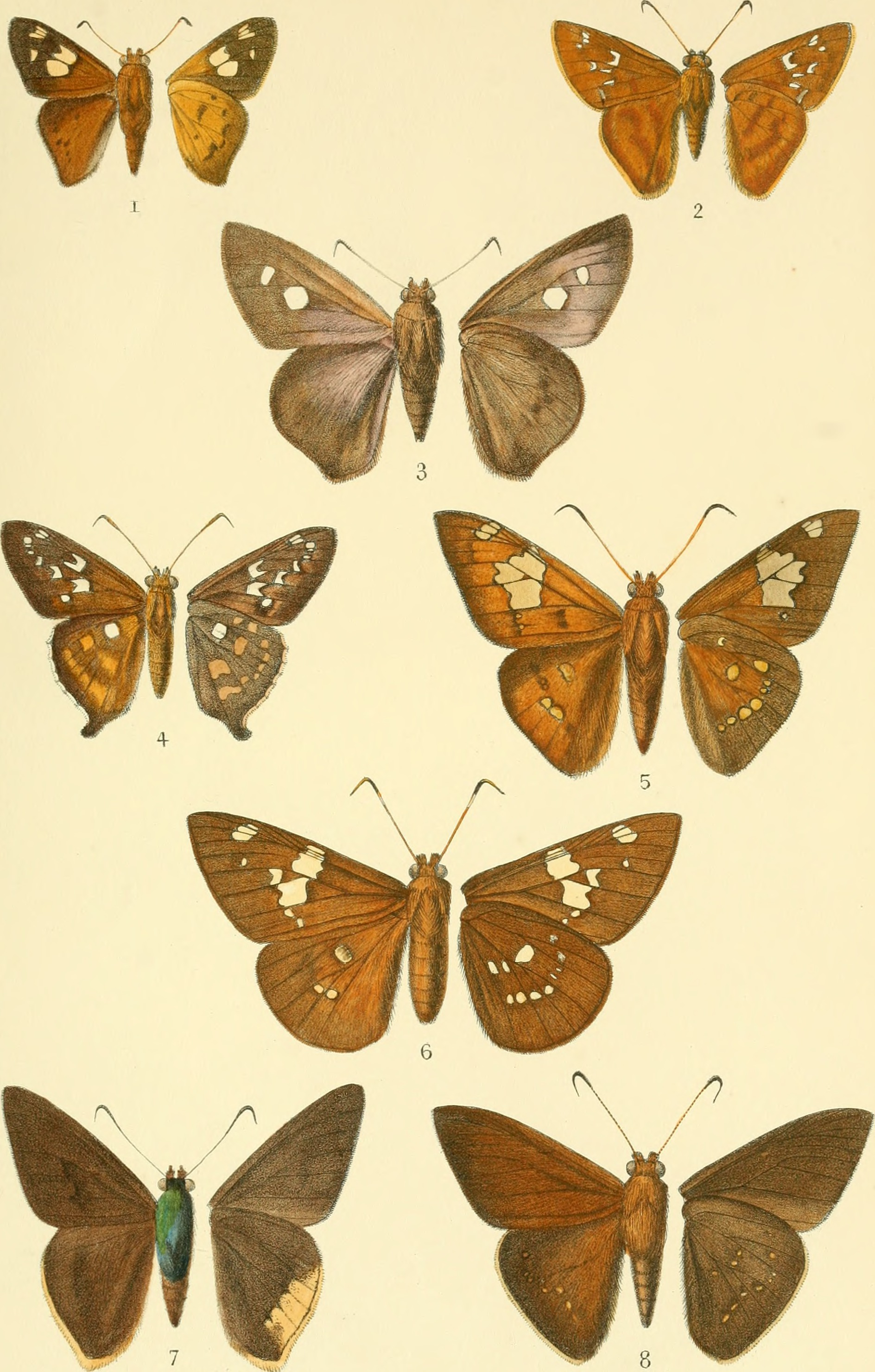
- E. e. polygius figure 5 male figure 6 female

Scientific classification
- Kingdom: Animalia
- Phylum: Arthropoda
- Clade: Pancrustacea
- Class: Insecta
- Order: Lepidoptera
- Family: Hesperiidae
- Tribe: Phocidini
- Genus: Euriphellus; G.T. Austin, 2008

= Euriphellus =

Genus of butterflies

Euriphellus is a genus of Neotropical butterflies in the family Hesperiidae, in which it is placed in the tribe Phocidini. The genus was separated from Dyscophellus by George Traut Austin in 2008, and originally contained a single species, Euriphellus euribates. Since then, several other species have been transferred to the genus.

== Species ==
The following species are recognised in the genus Euriphellus:

- Euriphellus lama (Evans, 1952)
- Euriphellus phraxanor (Hewitson, 1876)
- Euriphellus mena (Evans, 1952)
- Euriphellus marian (Evans, 1952)
- Euriphellus euribates (Stoll, 1872)
- Euriphellus polygius (Latreille, [1824])
