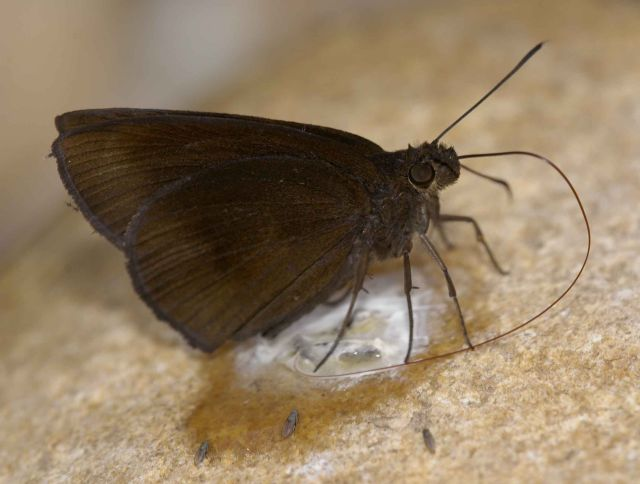
- Ancistroides nigrita

Scientific classification
- Kingdom: Animalia
- Phylum: Arthropoda
- Class: Insecta
- Order: Lepidoptera
- Family: Hesperiidae
- Tribe: Ancistroidini
- Genus: Ancistroides; Butler, 1874

= Ancistroides =

Genus of butterflies

Ancistroides is a genus of skippers in the family Hesperiidae.

== Species ==
- Ancistroides armatus (Druce, 1873)
- Ancistroides folus (Cramer, [1775]) - Sri Lanka, India (South India - Saurashtra, Bombay, Ahmedabad, Madhya Pradesh, Lucknow, Calcutta, Kangara to Assam), Burma, Thailand, Indochina, China, Taiwan, Malaysia, Indonesia (Java, Bali, Lombok, Sumbawa)
- Ancistroides gemmifer (Butler, 1879)
- Ancistroides longicornis Butler, 1874
- Ancistroides nigrita (Latreille, [1824]) – chocolate demon
- Ancistroides stellata (Oberthür, 1896) - China
