= Argemma maesseni =

Scientific classification
- Kingdom: Animalia
- Phylum: Arthropoda
- Class: Insecta
- Order: Lepidoptera
- Family: Hesperiidae
- Genus: Argemma
- Species: A. maesseni

Binomial name
- Argemma maesseni (Miller, 1971)

Synonyms
- Ceratrichia maesseni Miller, 1971

Species of butterfly

Argemma maesseni, commonly known as Maessen's forest sylph, is a species of butterfly in the family Hesperiidae. It is found in Ivory Coast and Ghana (the Ashanti Region). The habitat consists of forests.
