= Ceratrichia phocion =

- male C. p. phocion, Ghana

Scientific classification
- Kingdom: Animalia
- Phylum: Arthropoda
- Clade: Pancrustacea
- Class: Insecta
- Order: Lepidoptera
- Family: Hesperiidae
- Genus: Ceratrichia
- Species: C. phocion

Binomial name
- Ceratrichia phocion (Fabricius, 1781)

Synonyms
- Papilio phocion Fabricius, 1781; Papilio phocaeus Westwood, 1852

Species of butterfly

Ceratrichia phocion, also known as the common forest sylph, is a species of butterfly in the family Hesperiidae. It is found in Guinea, Sierra Leone, Liberia, Ivory Coast, Ghana, Nigeria, Cameroon, Equatorial Guinea, Gabon and the Republic of the Congo. The habitat consists of forests.

Adults are attracted to flowers.

== Subspecies ==
- Ceratrichia phocion phocion (Guinea, Sierra Leone, Liberia, Ivory Coast, Ghana, Nigeria, western Cameroon)
- Ceratrichia phocion camerona Miller, 1971 (Cameroon: except west, Equatorial Guinea, Gabon, Congo)

Torben Larsen developed a species numbering system for his 2005 publication Butterflies of West Africa. The nominate subspecies is #1301. The 'Larsen' numbers have since been used with permission in A Sharp Eye on Butterflies of Ghana.
