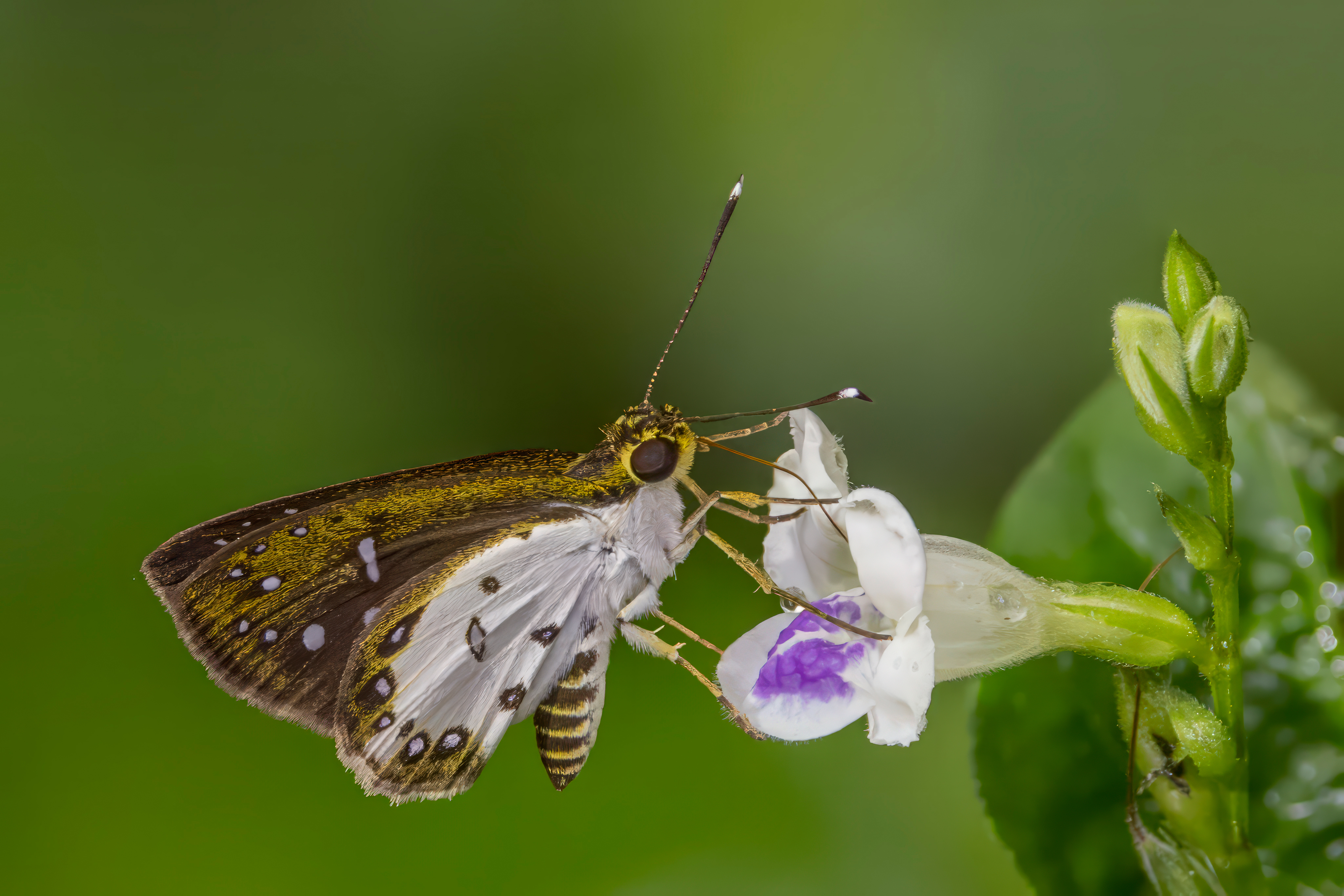
- in Ghana

Scientific classification
- Kingdom: Animalia
- Phylum: Arthropoda
- Clade: Pancrustacea
- Class: Insecta
- Order: Lepidoptera
- Family: Hesperiidae
- Genus: Ceratrichia
- Species: C. nothus

Binomial name
- Ceratrichia nothus (Fabricius, 1787)

Synonyms
- Papilio Plebeius Urbicola nothus Fabricius, 1787; Hypoleucis enantia Karsch, 1893; Ceratrichia makomensis Strand, 1913

= Ceratrichia nothus =

Species of butterfly

Ceratrichia nothus, commonly known as the white-winged forest sylph, is a species of butterfly in the family Hesperiidae. It is found in Guinea, Sierra Leone, Liberia, Ivory Coast, Ghana, Togo, Nigeria, Cameroon, Equatorial Guinea and the Central African Republic. The habitat consists of wetter forests.

== Subspecies ==
- Ceratrichia nothus nothus (Guinea, Sierra Leone, Liberia, Ivory Coast, western Ghana)
- Ceratrichia nothus enantia (Karsch, 1893) (central Ghana, Togo, Nigeria)
- Ceratrichia nothus makomensis Strand, 1913 (Nigeria, Cameroon, Equatorial Guinea)
- Ceratrichia nothus yakoli Collins & Larsen, 2003 (Central African Republic)

Torben Larsen developed a species numbering system for his 2005 publication Butterflies of West Africa. The nominate subspecies is #1306. The 'Larsen' numbers have since been used with permission in A Sharp Eye on Butterflies of Ghana.
