= Argemma mabirensis =

Scientific classification
- Kingdom: Animalia
- Phylum: Arthropoda
- Class: Insecta
- Order: Lepidoptera
- Family: Hesperiidae
- Genus: Argemma
- Species: A. mabirensis

Binomial name
- Argemma mabirensis (Riley, 1925)

Synonyms
- Ceratrichia toroensis Riley, 1925; Ceratrichia mabirensis Riley, 1925

Species of butterfly

Argemma mabirensis is a species of butterfly in the family Hesperiidae. It is found in the Democratic Republic of the Congo (from the eastern part of the country to the Ituri Forest), Uganda, western Kenya and north-western Tanzania. The habitat consists of forests.
