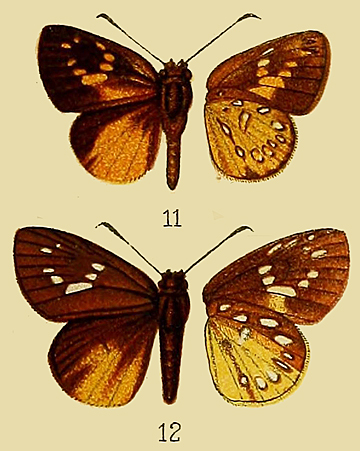
- male and female

Scientific classification
- Kingdom: Animalia
- Phylum: Arthropoda
- Class: Insecta
- Order: Lepidoptera
- Family: Hesperiidae
- Genus: Argemma
- Species: A. aurea

Binomial name
- Argemma aurea (H. H. Druce, 1910)

Synonyms
- Ceratrichia guineensis Strand, 1913; Ceratrichia aurea Druce, 1910; Ceratrichia aurea ugandae Riley, 1925

= Argemma aurea =

Species of butterfly

Argemma aurea is a species of butterfly in the family Hesperiidae first described by Hamilton Herbert Druce in 1910. It is found in Cameroon, the Republic of the Congo, the Democratic Republic of the Congo and Uganda. The habitat consists of forests.
