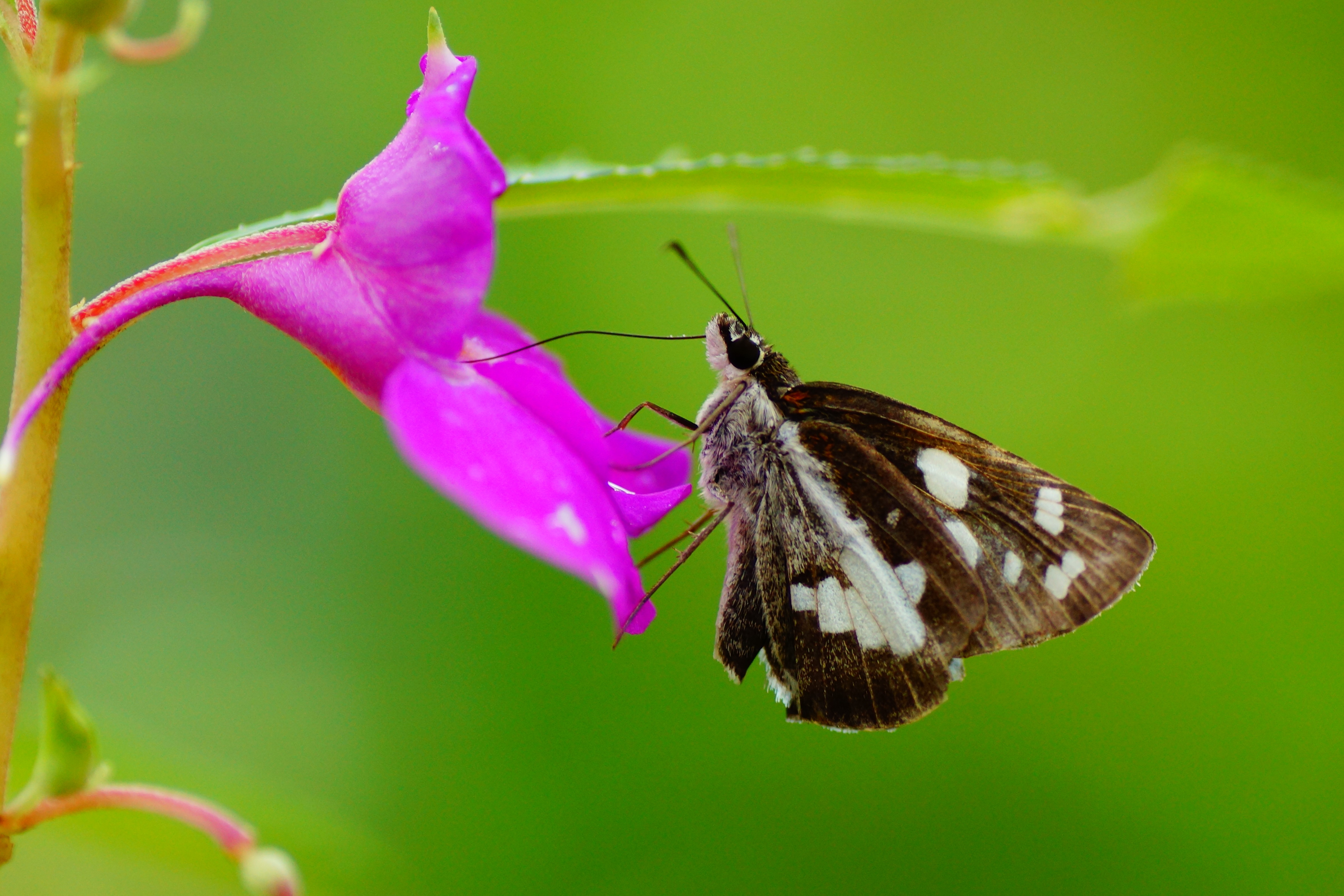

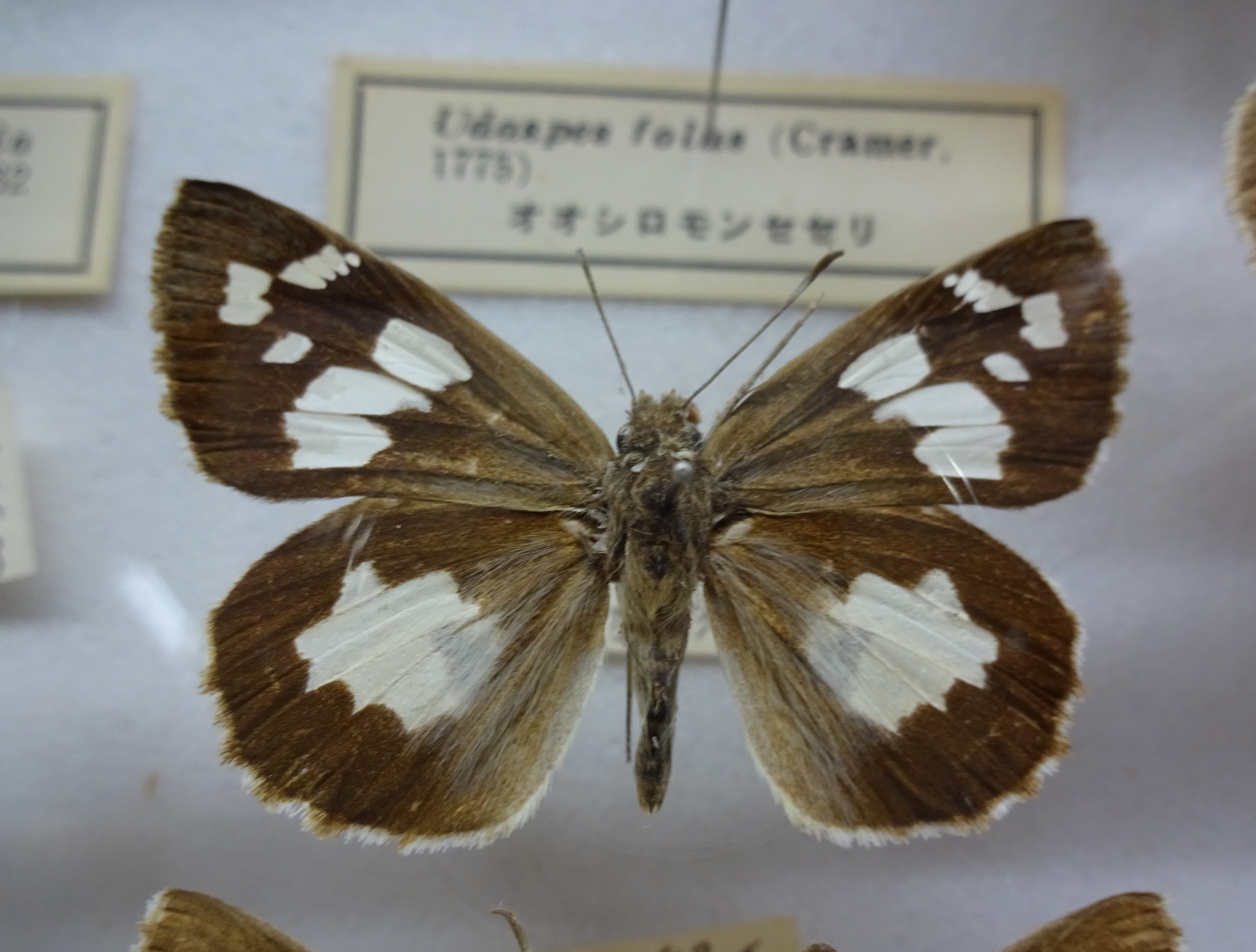

Scientific classification
- Kingdom: Animalia
- Phylum: Arthropoda
- Clade: Pancrustacea
- Class: Insecta
- Order: Lepidoptera
- Family: Hesperiidae
- Genus: Ancistroides
- Species: A. folus

Binomial name
- Ancistroides folus (Cramer, 1775)

= Ancistroides folus =

Species of butterfly

Ancistroides folus, the grass demon, is a small but prominent butterfly found in India & Nepal that belongs to the skipper family, Hesperiidae. It is regarded as an occasional pest of ginger and turmeric plants.

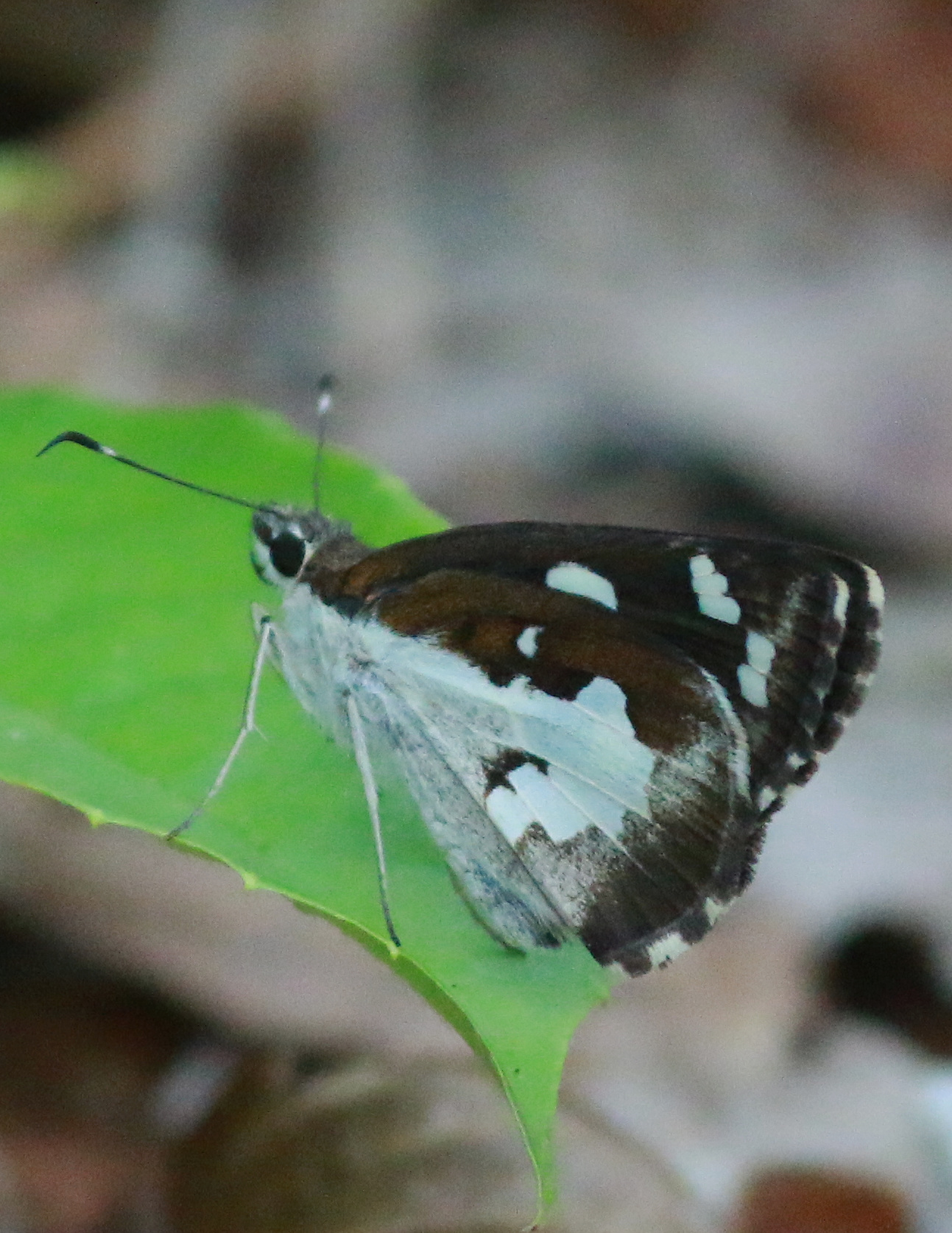

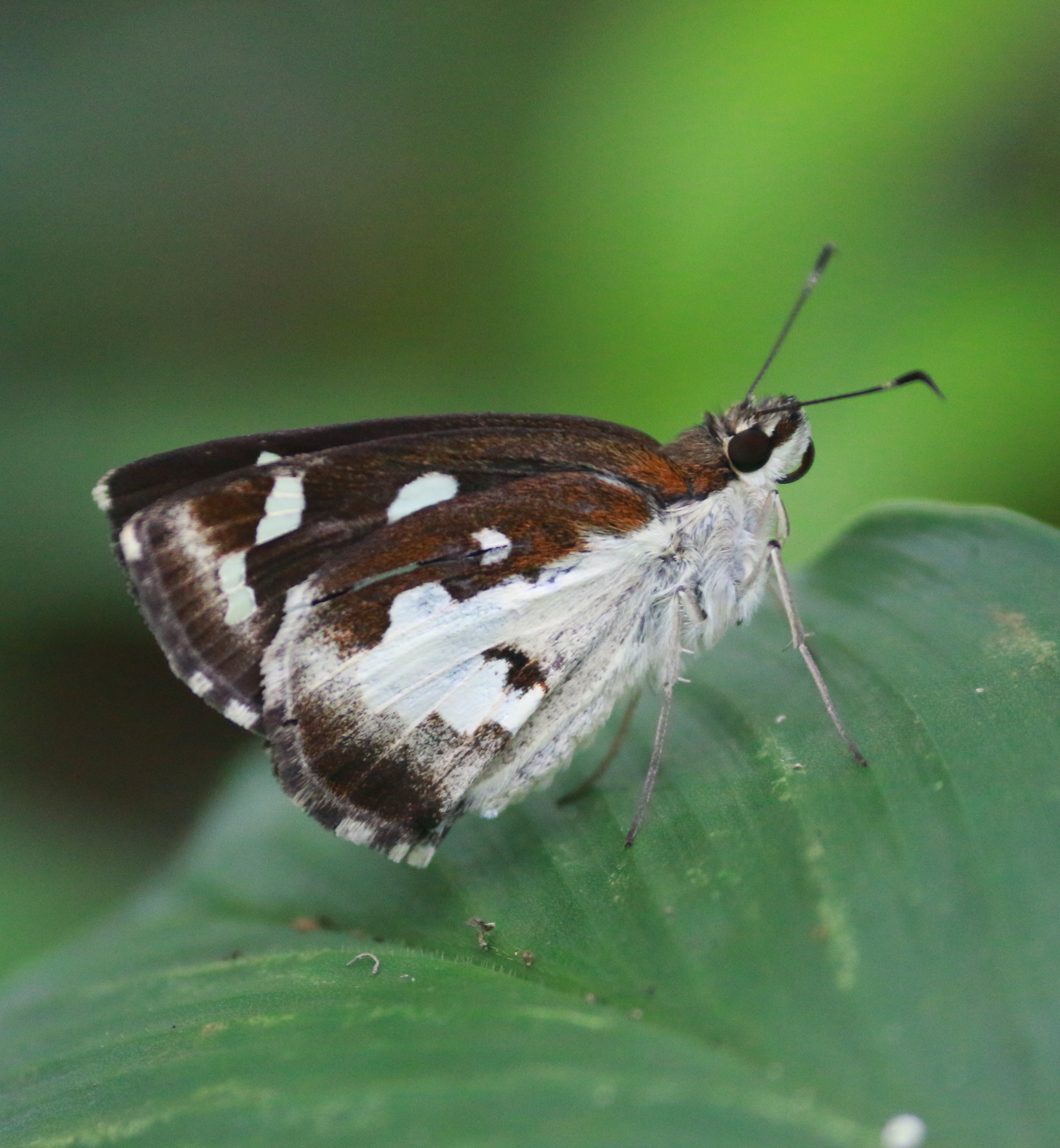

== Description ==
Male. Upperside black, the basal half of both wings covered with minute yellowish scales, markings pure white, semi-hyaline. Forewing with a large white spot filling up the end of the cell, two similar conjoined spots outwardly below it extending from beneath vein 4 to the sub-median vein, hardly separated from each other by vein 2; four conjugated sub-apical spots, the uppermost one minute, two similar spots below them nearer the outer margin, a small spot between these and the two large conjoined spots. Hindwing with a very large medial white patch with its margin sinuous all round; abdominal area covered with yellowish hairs. Underside paler. Forewing with the markings as on the upperside. Hindwing with the white medial patch extending to the abdominal margin from near the costa to one-third above the anal angle, the extension suffused with grey, also extending narrowly to the outer margin, double blackish-brown lunular marks, within the white space at the bases of the sub-median nervules. Cilia blackish, alternated with white. Antennae black; palpi, head and body concolorous with the wings, whitish on the underside, legs brown above, whitish beneath. Female like the male, but the spots are larger.

— Charles Swinhoe, Lepidoptera Indica. Vol. X

It is a small butterfly with a wingspan of about 4 to 4.8 cm. It is black with a large white spot on the upperside of the hindwing and several smaller whites spots on the forewing. The underside of its wings is mostly white with brown edges and spots.

== Range ==
Sri Lanka, India, Nepal and onto Myanmar, China, India, Indochina, Taiwan, Japan, Thailand, Malaysian Peninsula, Singapore, Borneo, Indonesia

== Status ==
Not rare in India. Rare or very rare in certain parts of its global range. This butterfly is seen chiefly during the monsoon, perhaps due to its larval host plants growing at this time of the year.

== Habitat ==
The grass demon is to be found in deciduous and semi-evergreen forests. It prefers the edges of open spaces rather than the deep forest shade or open sunlight. It is most abundant in the more open regions of hilly jungle. It is also encountered on the plains at some distance from such terrain. It occurs up to 8,000 feet (2,400 m) in the hills of South India and up to 5,000 feet (1,500 m) in the Himalayas. It is common also in gardens and agricultural fields that have ginger and turmeric plants.

== Habits ==
The grass demon prefers forest edges or clearings where dappled light is present. Its black and white colouration may have evolved to take advantage of the dappled light in these areas. The pied pattern which seems prominent in the open is effectively disruptive in the shade and the butterfly is difficult to locate once it settles down.

It usually flies in the shade among bushes and under trees keeping low and close to the ground. From time to time, it takes short flights, and, occasionally, much longer excursions into the open clearings. Its flight is quick and the path is very erratic making it very difficult to track when in flight.

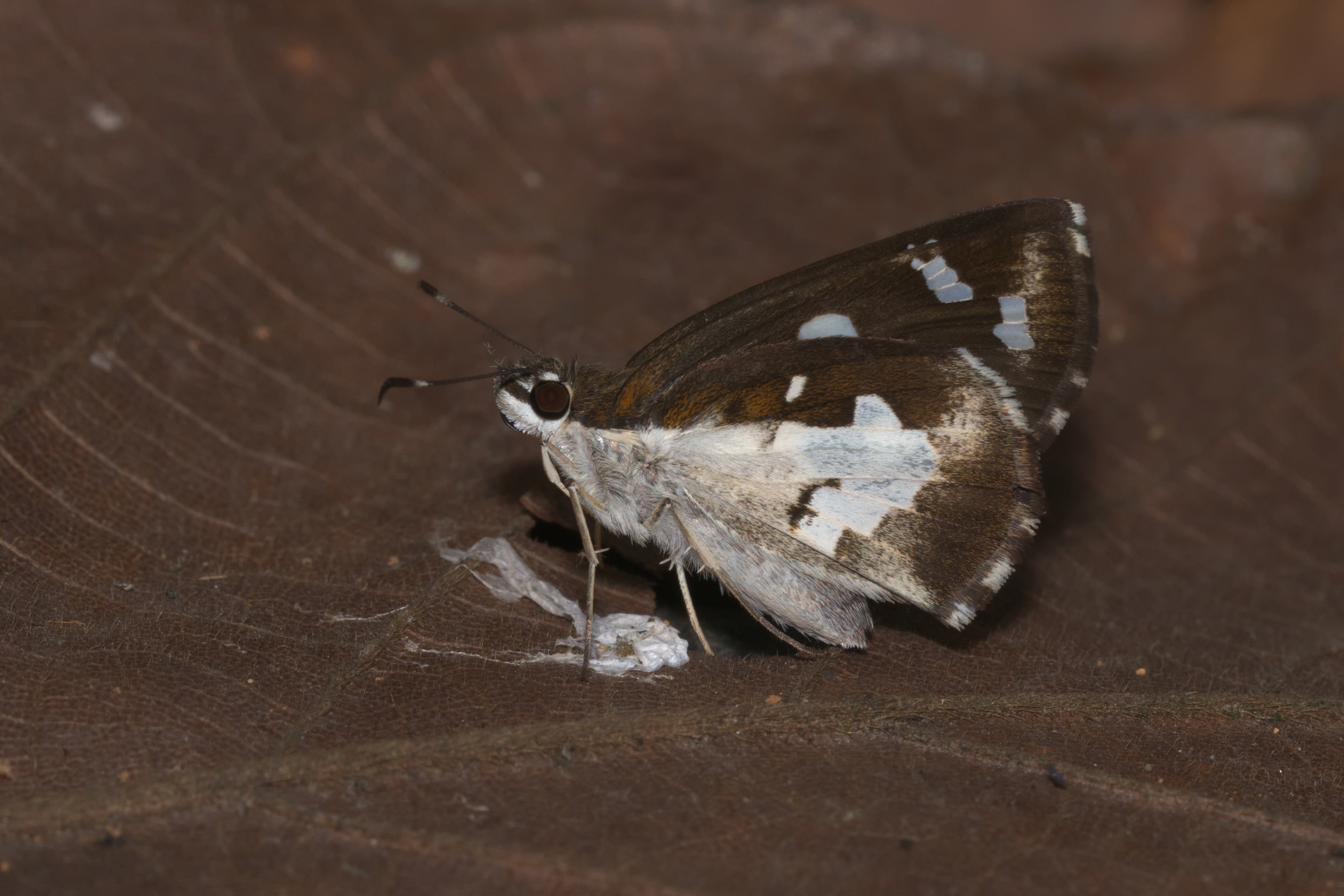
Underside

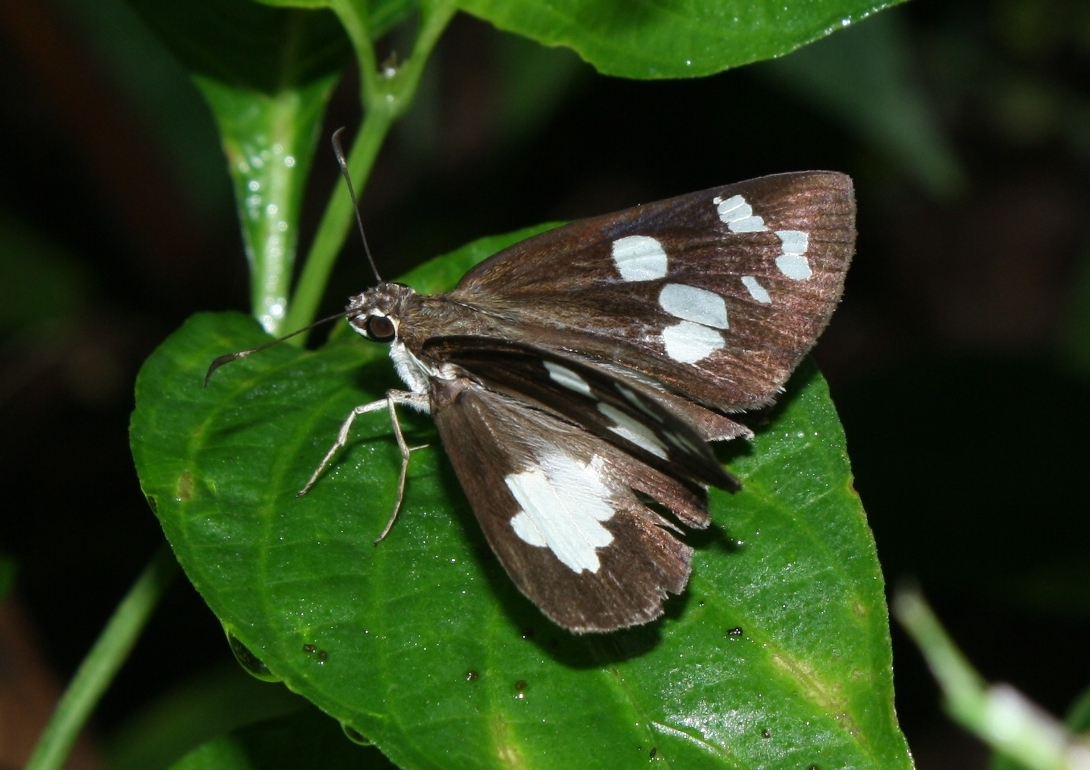
Upperside

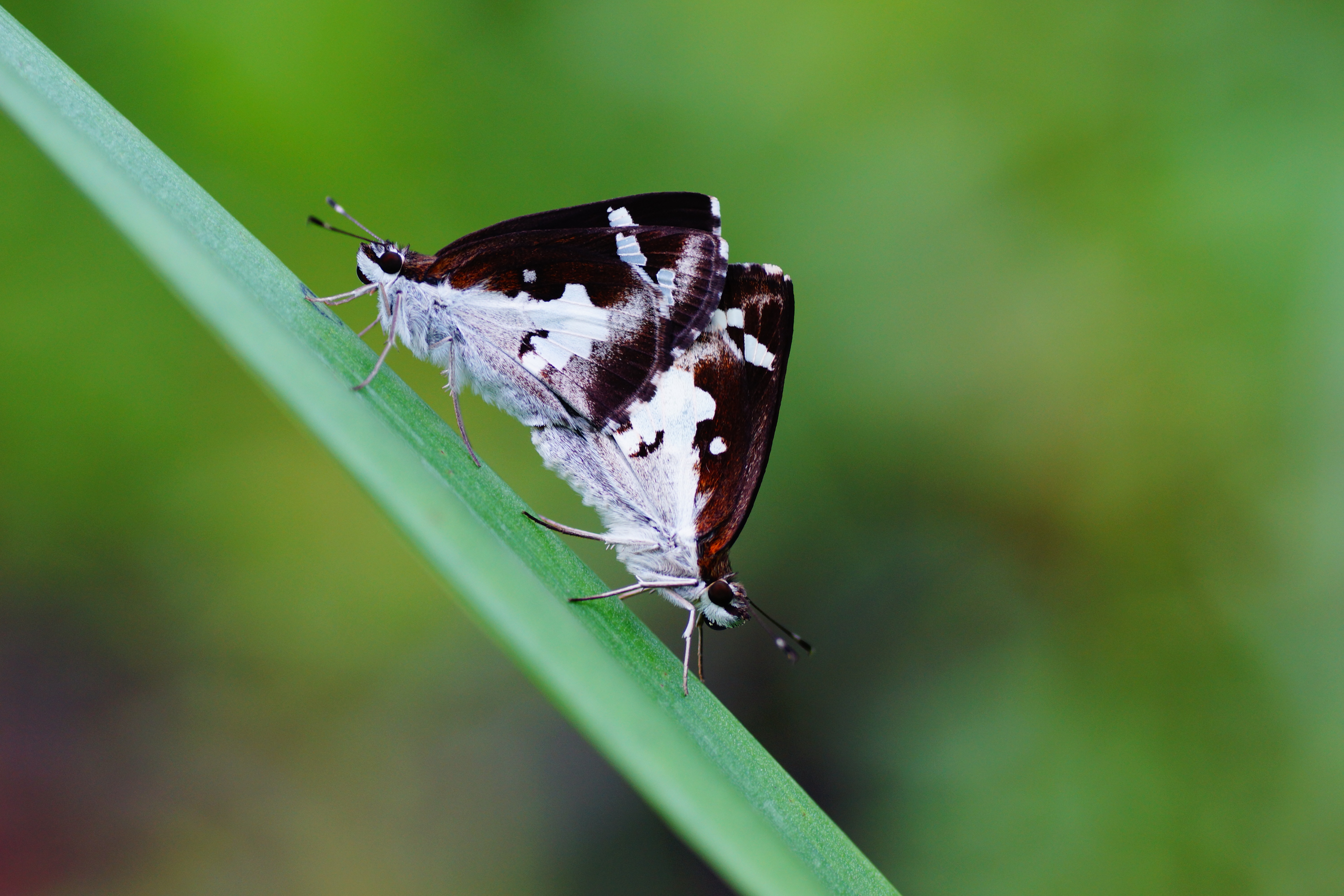
Mating pair

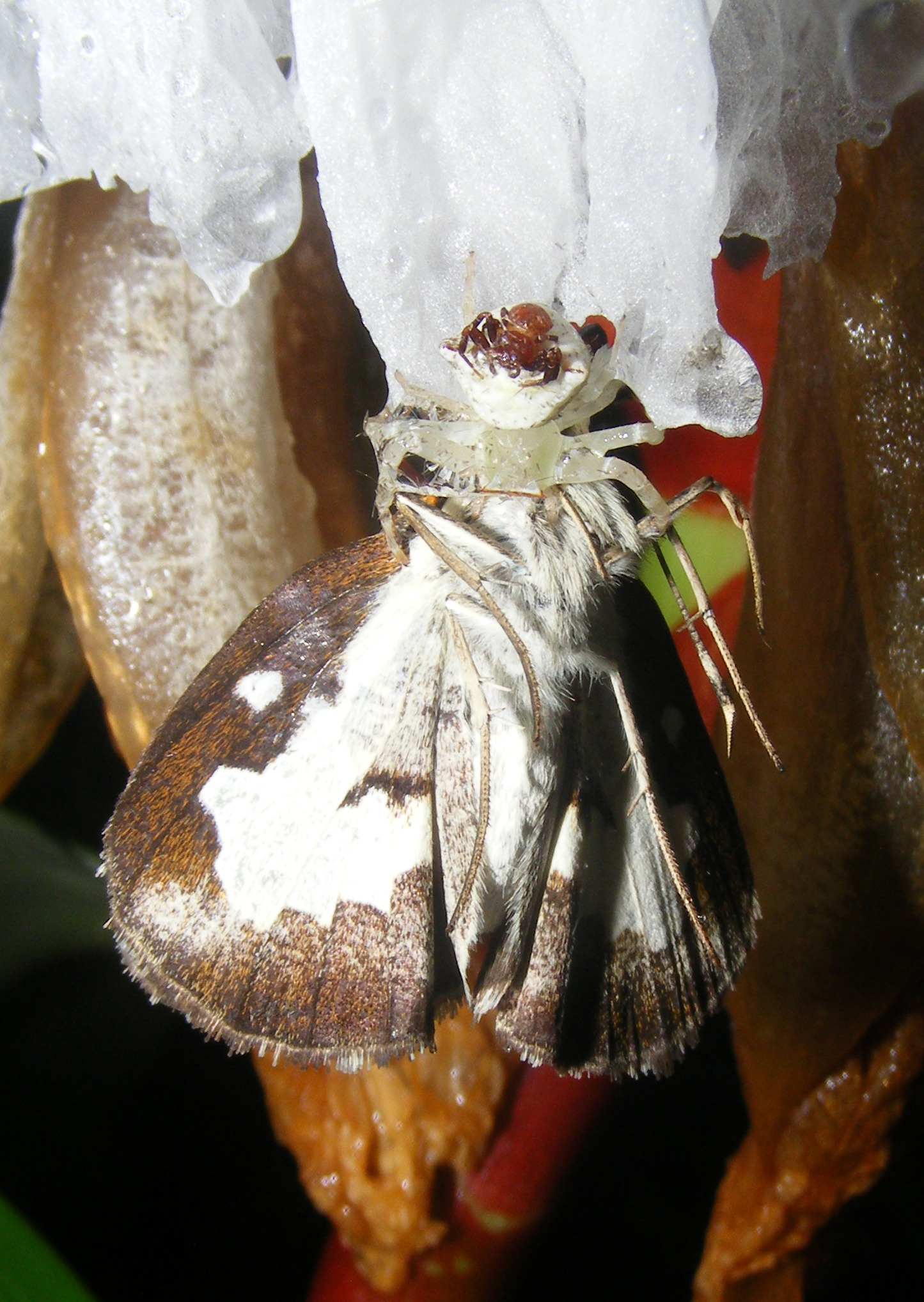
As prey of a crab spider

When basking it sits on the upperside of leaves of herbs or bushes with its hindwings pressed flat against the surface and its forewings held half open at an angle above the hindwings.

This butterfly also has a distinctive wing flashing display most often seen just after it has alighted on a leaf. It will move its hindwings down toward the leaf surface. When the hindwings are about halfway down the forewings also start moving downwards. On the upward beat both wings are moved simultaneously till the hindwings come together. Then it again begins the downward beat. Each beat is performed very slowly and the butterfly is very conspicuous during this time.

This display is unique since no other peninsular Indian butterfly is known to display the capability of moving forewings and hindwings separately.

== Life cycle ==
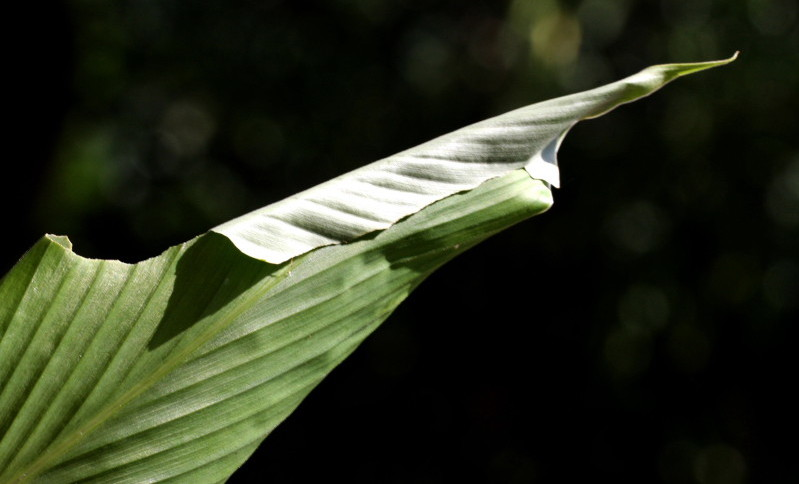
Leaf cell

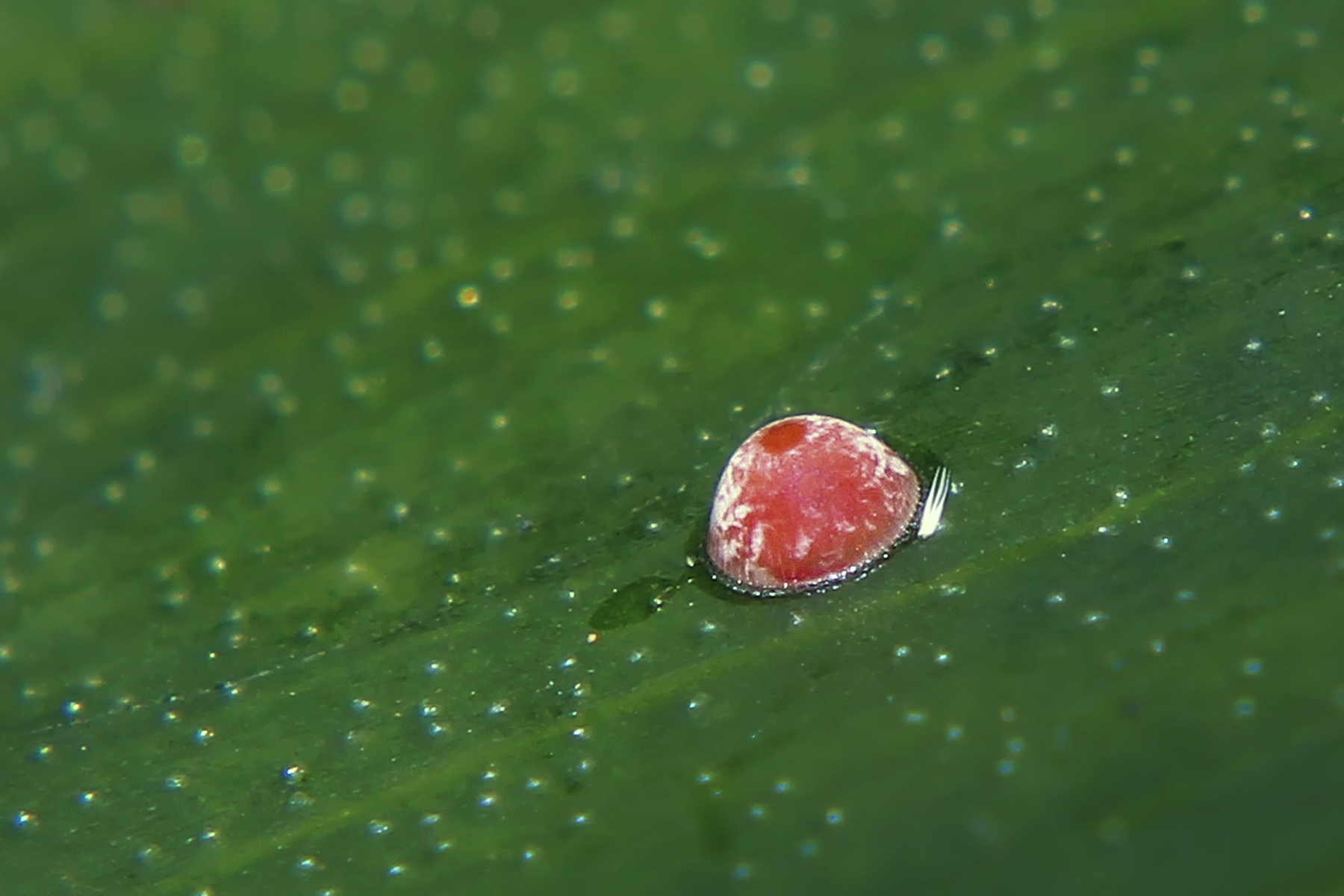
Egg

The butterflies emerge in February or March and lay eggs before they die. The eggs remain dormant till the rains, that is, usually the month of May, when they hatch. The caterpillars pupate in September and October and the adults emerge four to six months later. In some cases the caterpillars pupate later and in these cases the pupa remain dormant, throughout the dry season, till May when the rains begin.

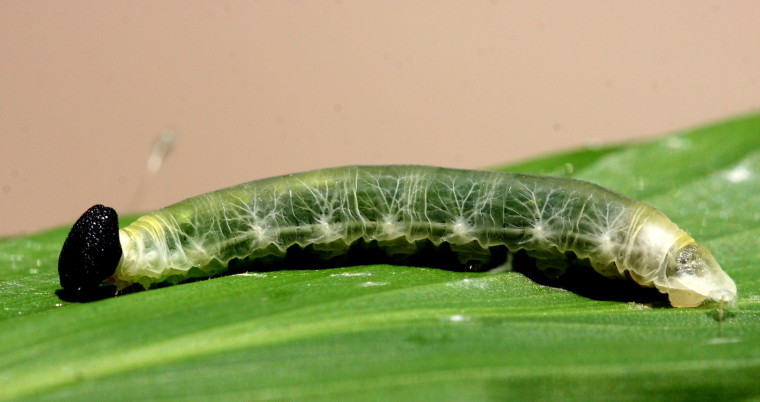
Larva

=== Eggs ===
The female normally sits on the underside of the leaf of the host plant and lays a single egg. The egg is reddish and appears smooth and dome shaped. When about to hatch it turns white with a red top.

=== Caterpillars ===
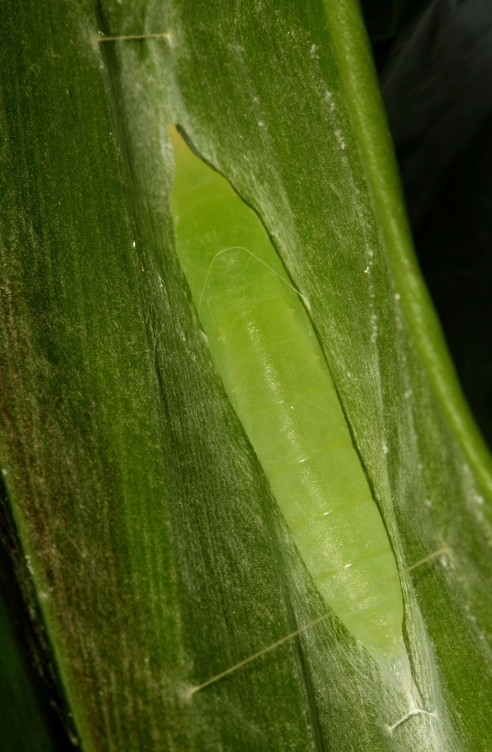
Pupa

Soon after hatching, the caterpillar does not consume the eggshell completely and it makes itself a spacious cell and hides inside it. The caterpillar is sluggish and comes out to feed only at night. Even when disturbed it is reluctant to leave its cell.

The caterpillar is a light uniform leaf green colour with a dark green pulsating line on the back and a relatively small, dark head. The full grown larva has the habit of resting with the first three segments contracted, so as to give a humped appearance. It always lies closely applied to the leaf, by turning over a triangular piece from the edge onto the upper surface over itself. Specific host plants include Zingiber zerumbet.

Caterpillar of grass demon are frequently parasitised by wasps and horsehair worms. When parasitised, the caterpillar becomes translucent allowing the internal parasites to be clearly visible.

=== Pupa ===
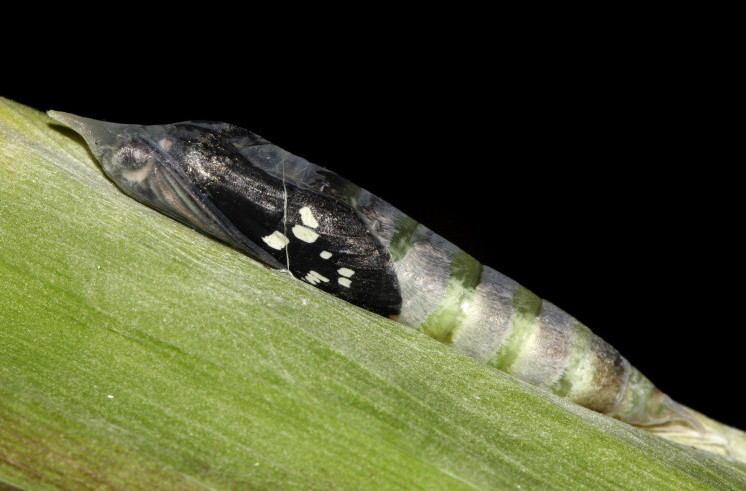
Pupa

Pupation takes place on the same plant within a cell. The pupa is long and cylindrical, watery green in colour. It has a long conical projection in front of the head. The eyes are easily seen but do not protrude out of the outline of the pupa. The pupa broadens towards the shoulders and the abdomen gradually tapers to the last segment.

The most striking characteristic of the pupa is its proboscis. It is long and thin generally extending up to and a little beyond the tip of the abdomen. The pupa is the same colour of the caterpillar and unmarked. It is covered in a thin layer of white powder. The body band is neither too tight nor too loose and allows the pupa to wriggle if disturbed.

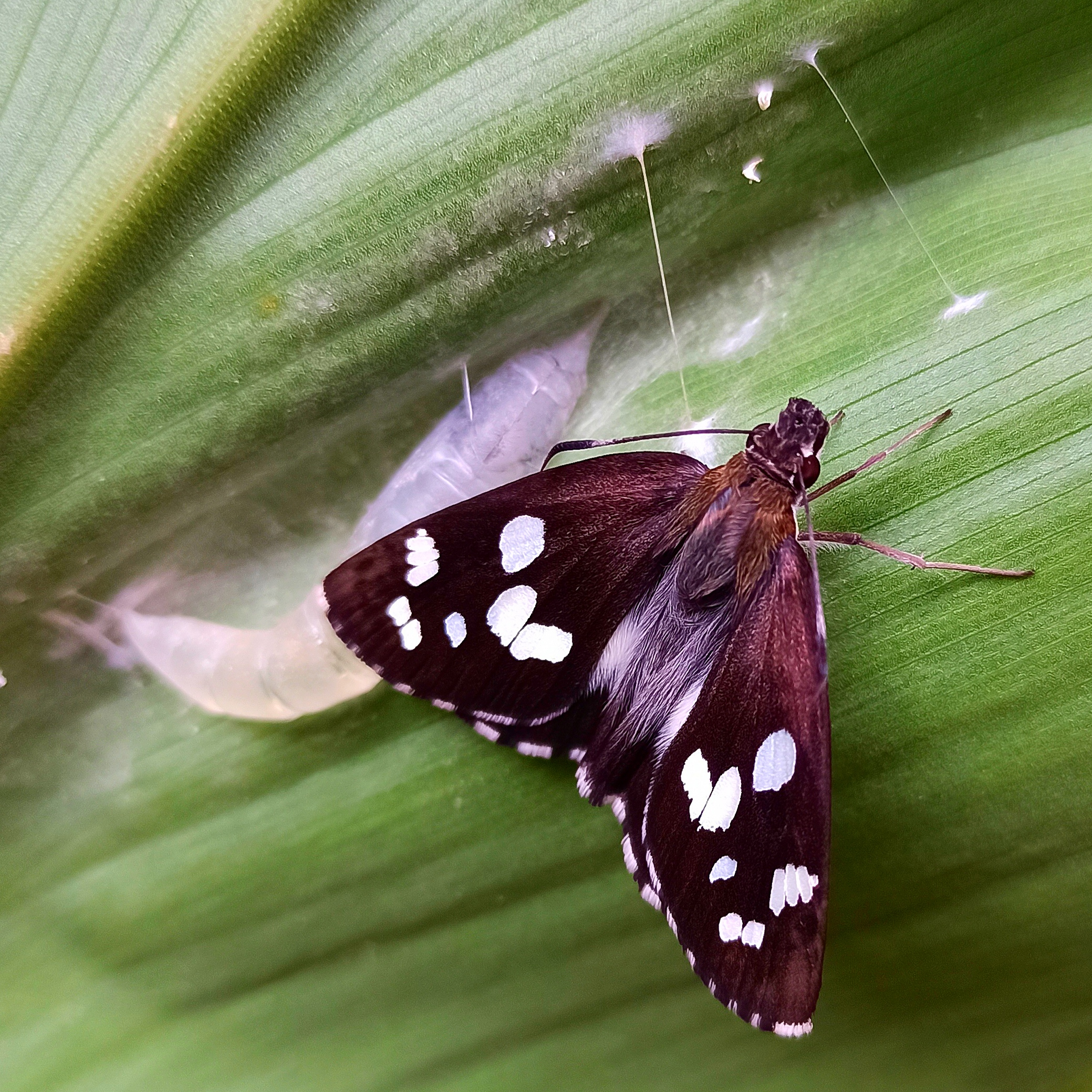
Butterfly just after emerging out of its pupa

== Food plants ==
The grass demon feeds on ginger, turmeric, and their relatives Curcuma aromatica, Curcuma decipiens, Hedychium sp. and other plants of family Sctiaminae. It has also been recorded on Zingiber sp. and on grasses.

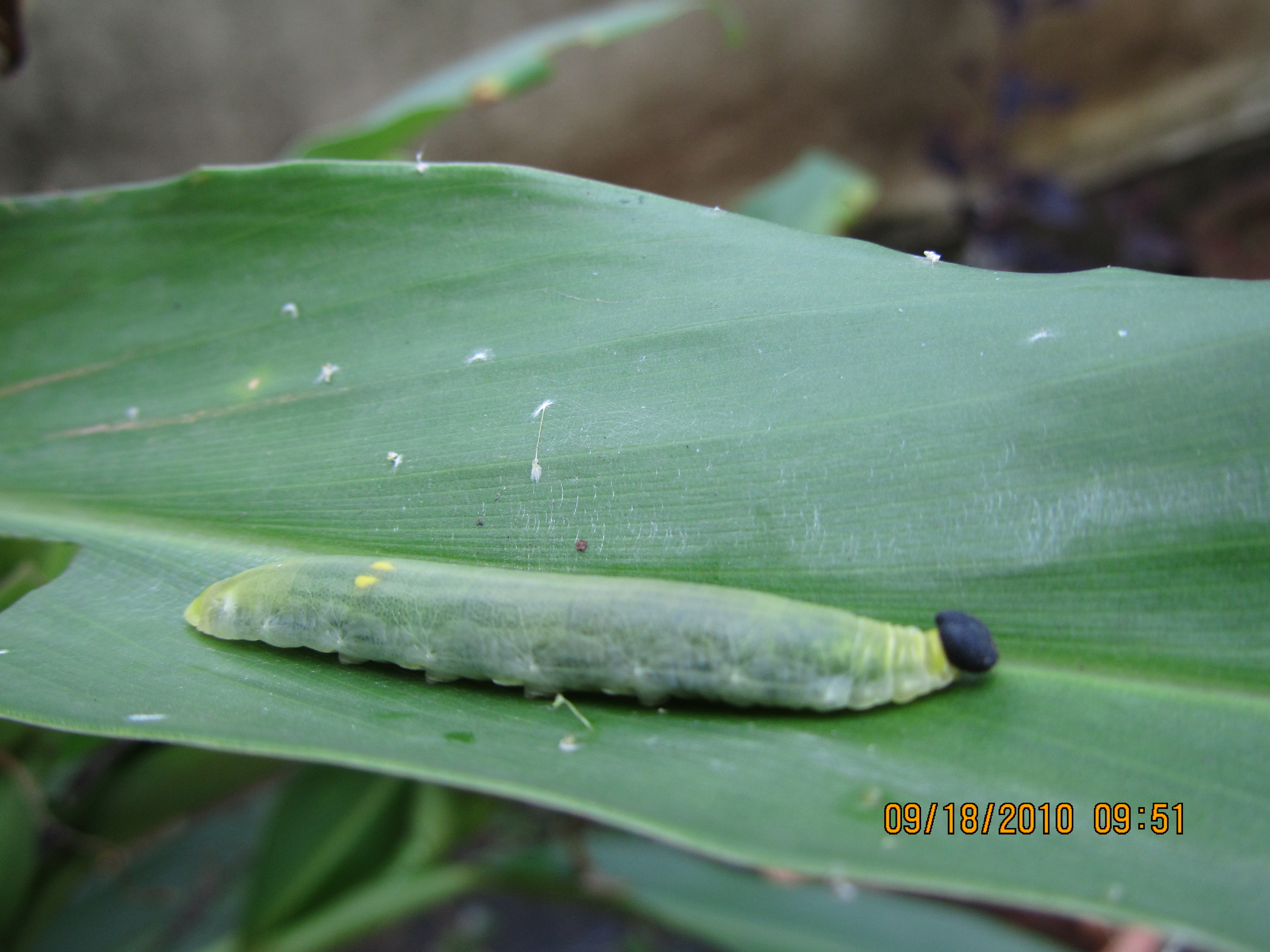
Caterpillar on ginger leaf

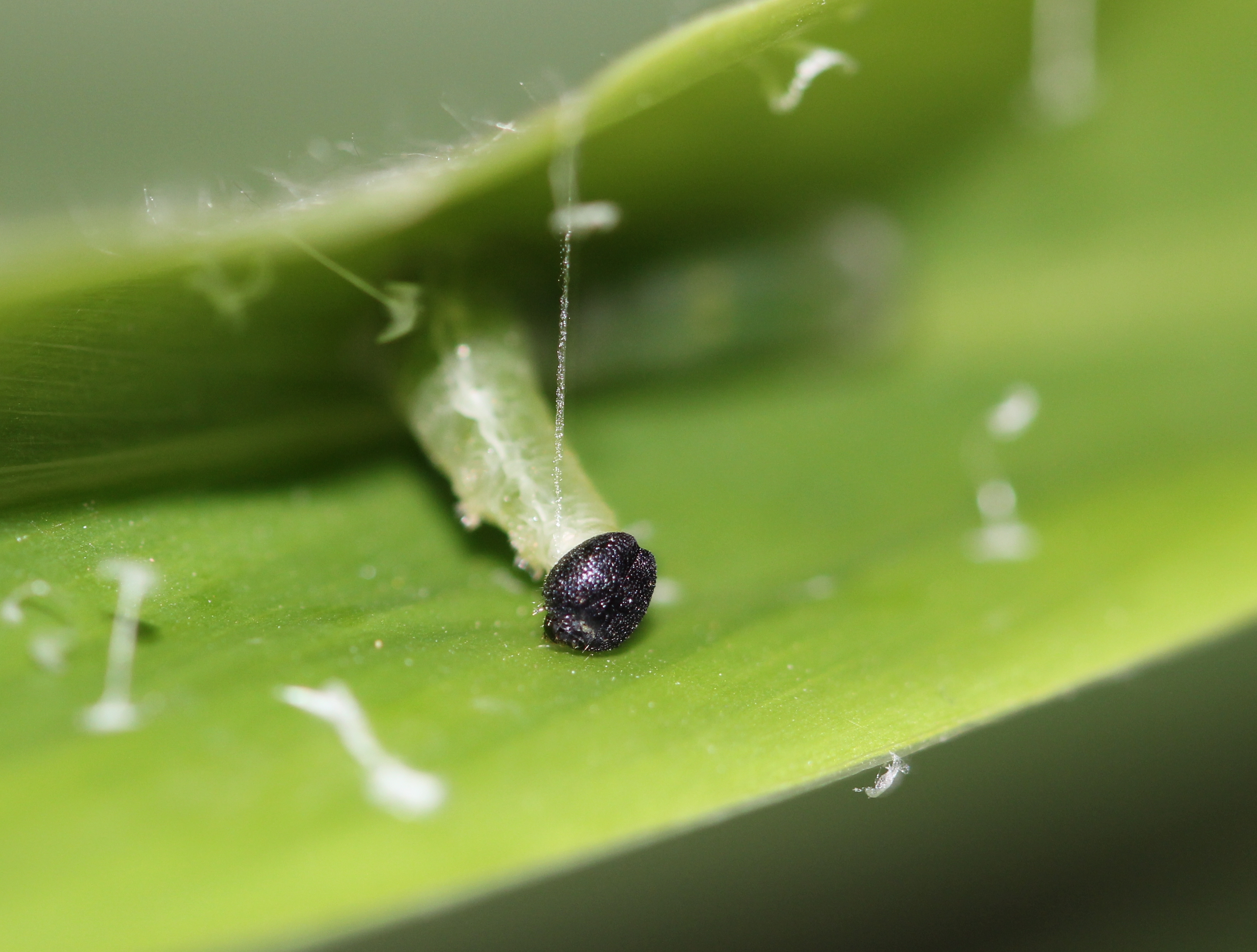
Caterpillar constructing its leaf shelter

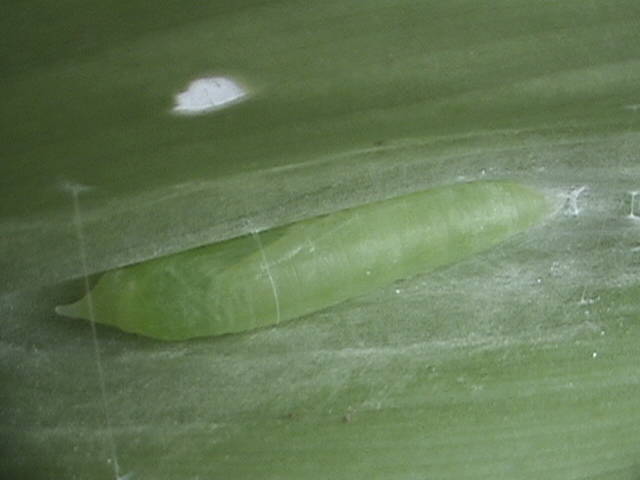
Pupa on turmeric

Grass demon is a well known pest on turmeric Curcuma longa in India, and is subjected to chemical and bio-pesticide treatment regularly to control populations. Grass demons have shown to develop chemical resilience, especially to carbofuran and quinalops, but showed high mortality when sprayed with entomopathogenic fungus such as Hirsutella citriformis and Metrarhizium anisophilae.
