= Argemma bonga =

Scientific classification
- Kingdom: Animalia
- Phylum: Arthropoda
- Class: Insecta
- Order: Lepidoptera
- Family: Hesperiidae
- Genus: Argemma
- Species: A. bonga

Binomial name
- Argemma bonga (Evans, 1947)

Synonyms
- Ceratrichia bonga Evans, 1947

Species of butterfly

Argemma bonga is a butterfly in the family Hesperiidae. It is found in Tanzania (Usambara and Uluguru mountains). The habitat consists of forests.
