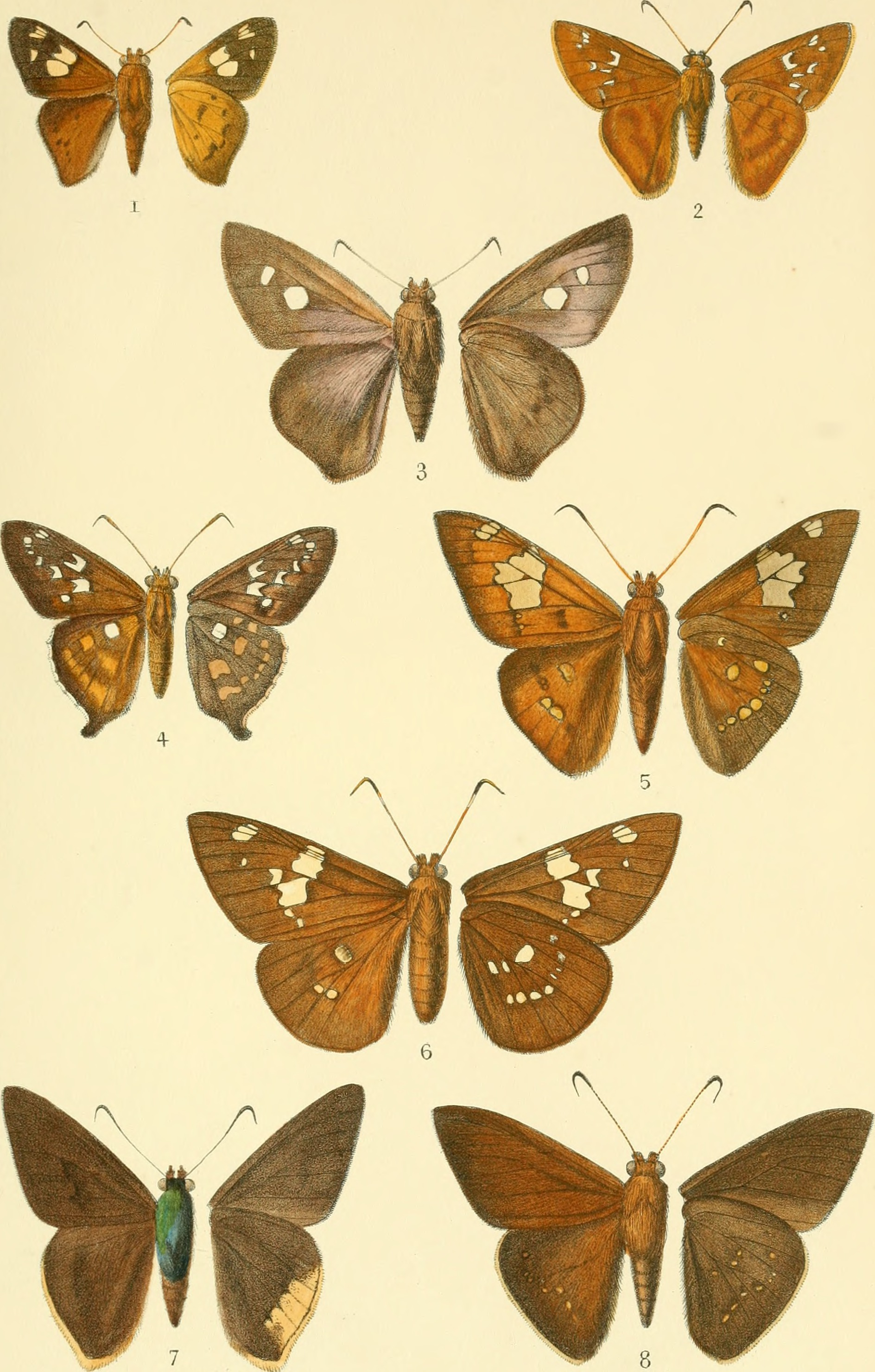
- Euriphellus euribates polygius figure 5 male figure 6 female

Scientific classification
- Kingdom: Animalia
- Phylum: Arthropoda
- Class: Insecta
- Order: Lepidoptera
- Family: Hesperiidae
- Genus: Euriphellus
- Species: E. euribates

Binomial name
- Euriphellus euribates (Stoll, 1872)

Synonyms
- List: Papilio euribates Stoll, 1872; Dyscophellus euribates (Stoll, 1872); Papilio nicias Fabricius, 1787; Telegonus hesus Westwood, [1852]; Eudamus etias Hewitson, 1867; Telegonus gaurus Plötz, 1882; Telegonus tychios Plötz, 1882; Hesperia polygius Latreille, [1824]

= Euriphellus euribates =

Species of butterflies

Euriphellus euribates is a species of butterfly in the family Hesperiidae.

== Description ==
The wingspan is 28–30 mm. The forewings are tawny brown, with three large yellow-orange discal partially translucent macules and two to three translucent subapical macules of the same colour. The hindwings have a small area of shiny scales. Adults are crepuscular.

== Distribution and habitat ==
Euriphellus euribates is found from Costa Rica southwards to Bolivia and southern Brazil.
