= Stempfferia cinerea =

Scientific classification
- Domain: Eukaryota
- Kingdom: Animalia
- Phylum: Arthropoda
- Class: Insecta
- Order: Lepidoptera
- Family: Lycaenidae
- Genus: Stempfferia
- Species: S. cinerea

Binomial name
- Stempfferia cinerea (Berger, 1981)

Synonyms
- Epitola cinerea Berger, 1981; Stempfferia (Cercenia) cinerea

Species of butterfly

Stempfferia cinerea is a butterfly in the family Lycaenidae. It is found in Cameroon, the Republic of the Congo, the Central African Republic and the Democratic Republic of the Congo.
