= Stempfferia bouyeri =

Scientific classification
- Domain: Eukaryota
- Kingdom: Animalia
- Phylum: Arthropoda
- Class: Insecta
- Order: Lepidoptera
- Family: Lycaenidae
- Genus: Stempfferia
- Species: S. bouyeri

Binomial name
- Stempfferia bouyeri Libert & Collins, 1999

Synonyms
- Stempfferia (Cercenia) bouyeri

Species of butterfly

Stempfferia bouyeri is a butterfly in the family Lycaenidae. It is found in Cameroon and Gabon.
