= Stempfferia schultzei =

Scientific classification
- Kingdom: Animalia
- Phylum: Arthropoda
- Class: Insecta
- Order: Lepidoptera
- Family: Lycaenidae
- Genus: Stempfferia
- Species: S. schultzei

Binomial name
- Stempfferia schultzei Libert, 1999

Synonyms
- Stempfferia (Cercenia) schultzei

Species of butterfly

Stempfferia schultzei is a butterfly in the family Lycaenidae. It is found in Cameroon.
