= Stempfferia ife =

Scientific classification
- Domain: Eukaryota
- Kingdom: Animalia
- Phylum: Arthropoda
- Class: Insecta
- Order: Lepidoptera
- Family: Lycaenidae
- Genus: Stempfferia
- Species: S. ife

Binomial name
- Stempfferia ife Libert, 1999

Synonyms
- Stempfferia (Cercenia) ife

Species of butterfly

Stempfferia ife, the Lamborn's furry epitola, is a butterfly in the family Lycaenidae. It is found in western Nigeria. The habitat consists of forests.
