= Stempfferia boormani =

Scientific classification
- Domain: Eukaryota
- Kingdom: Animalia
- Phylum: Arthropoda
- Class: Insecta
- Order: Lepidoptera
- Family: Lycaenidae
- Genus: Stempfferia
- Species: S. boormani

Binomial name
- Stempfferia boormani Libert, 1999

Synonyms
- Stempfferia (Cercenia) boormani

Species of butterfly

Stempfferia boormani, the Boorman's epitola, is a butterfly in the family Lycaenidae. It is found in eastern Nigeria. The habitat consists of forests.
