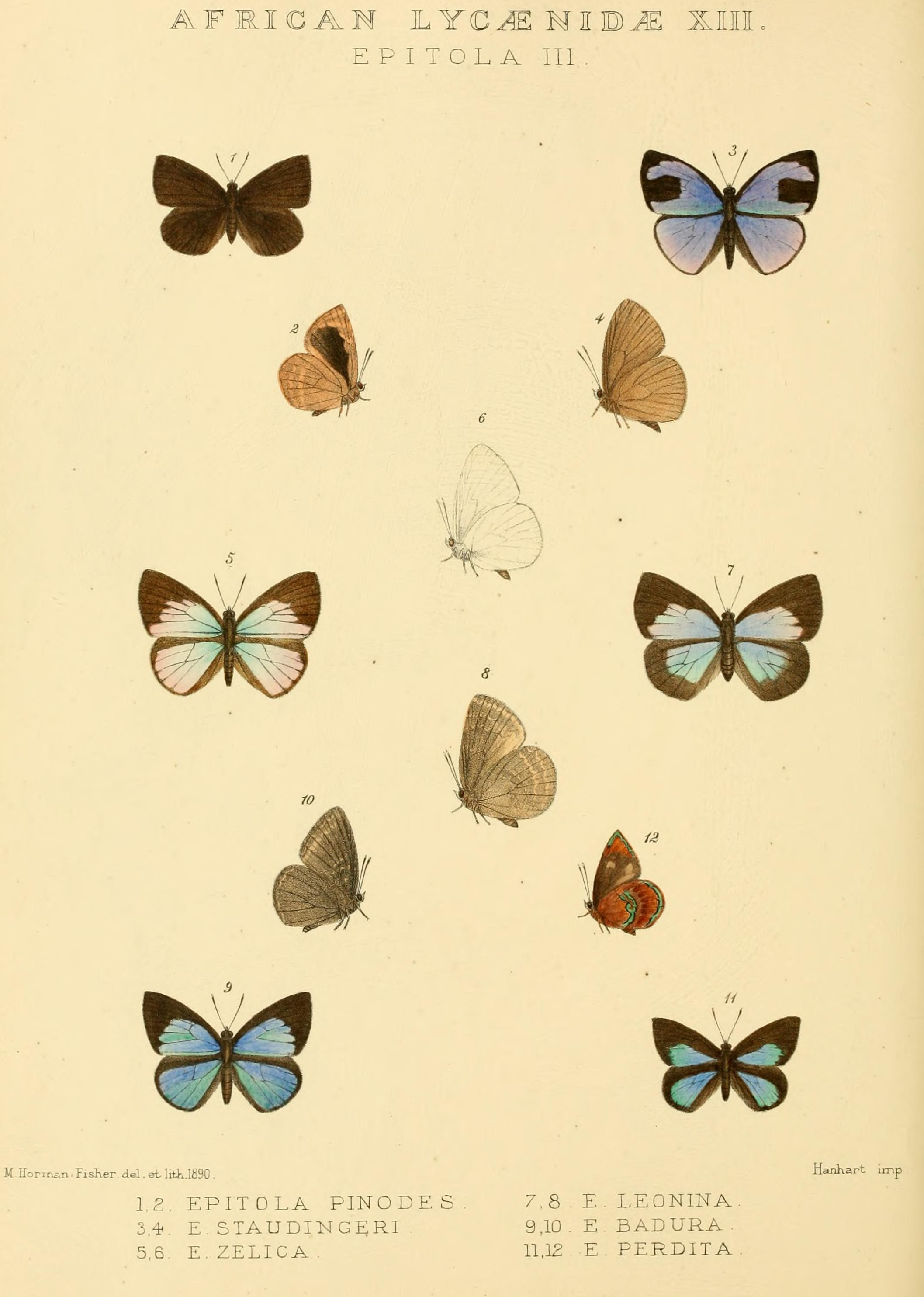

Scientific classification
- Kingdom: Animalia
- Phylum: Arthropoda
- Class: Insecta
- Order: Lepidoptera
- Family: Lycaenidae
- Genus: Stempfferia
- Species: S. badura

Binomial name
- Stempfferia badura (Kirby, 1890)

Synonyms
- Epitola badura Kirby, 1890; Stempfferia (Cercenia) badura

= Stempfferia badura =

Species of butterfly

Stempfferia badura is a butterfly in the family Lycaenidae. It is found in Cameroon, the Republic of the Congo, Gabon, the Democratic Republic of the Congo and Uganda.

== Subspecies ==
- Stempfferia badura badura (Cameroon, Congo, Gabon, Democratic Republic of the Congo)
- Stempfferia badura contrasta Libert, 1999 (Democratic Republic of the Congo, Uganda)
