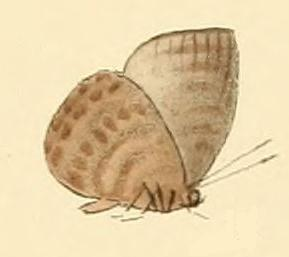

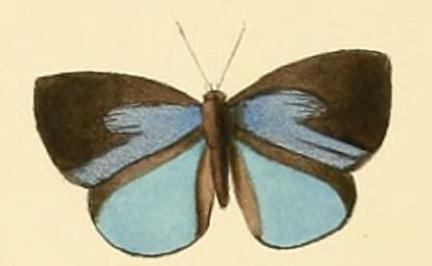

Scientific classification
- Kingdom: Animalia
- Phylum: Arthropoda
- Clade: Pancrustacea
- Class: Insecta
- Order: Lepidoptera
- Family: Lycaenidae
- Genus: Stempfferia
- Species: S. zelza

Binomial name
- Stempfferia zelza (Hewitson, 1873)

Synonyms
- Epitola zelza Hewitson, 1873; Stempfferia (Cercenia) zelza; Epitola badia Kirby, 1887

= Stempfferia zelza =

Species of butterfly

Stempfferia zelza, the little epitola, is a butterfly in the family Lycaenidae. It is found in Ivory Coast, Ghana (the Volta Region), Togo, Nigeria (south and the Cross River loop), Cameroon, Gabon, the Republic of the Congo, the Central African Republic and the Democratic Republic of the Congo. The habitat consists of forests.
