= Stempfferia magnifica =

Scientific classification
- Domain: Eukaryota
- Kingdom: Animalia
- Phylum: Arthropoda
- Class: Insecta
- Order: Lepidoptera
- Family: Lycaenidae
- Genus: Stempfferia
- Species: S. magnifica

Binomial name
- Stempfferia magnifica (Jackson, 1964)

Synonyms
- Epitola magnifica Jackson, 1964; Stempfferia (Cercenia) magnifica

Species of butterfly

Stempfferia magnifica is a butterfly in the family Lycaenidae. It is found in the Republic of the Congo and the Democratic Republic of the Congo.
