= Stempfferia mara =

Scientific classification
- Kingdom: Animalia
- Phylum: Arthropoda
- Class: Insecta
- Order: Lepidoptera
- Family: Lycaenidae
- Genus: Stempfferia
- Species: S. mara

Binomial name
- Stempfferia mara (Talbot, 1935)

Synonyms
- Epitola staudingeri mara Talbot, 1935; Stempfferia (Cercenia) mara

Species of butterfly

Stempfferia mara is a butterfly in the family Lycaenidae. It is found in Uganda (the western shore of Lake Victoria) and north-western Tanzania.
