= Stempfferia moyambina =

Scientific classification
- Domain: Eukaryota
- Kingdom: Animalia
- Phylum: Arthropoda
- Class: Insecta
- Order: Lepidoptera
- Family: Lycaenidae
- Genus: Stempfferia
- Species: S. moyambina

Binomial name
- Stempfferia moyambina (Bethune-Baker, 1903)

Synonyms
- Epitola moyambina Bethune-Baker, 1903; Stempfferia (Cercenia) moyambina

Species of butterfly

Stempfferia moyambina, the Moyamba epitola, is a butterfly in the family Lycaenidae. It is found in Sierra Leone, Ivory Coast, Ghana and southern and eastern Nigeria. The habitat consists of forests.
