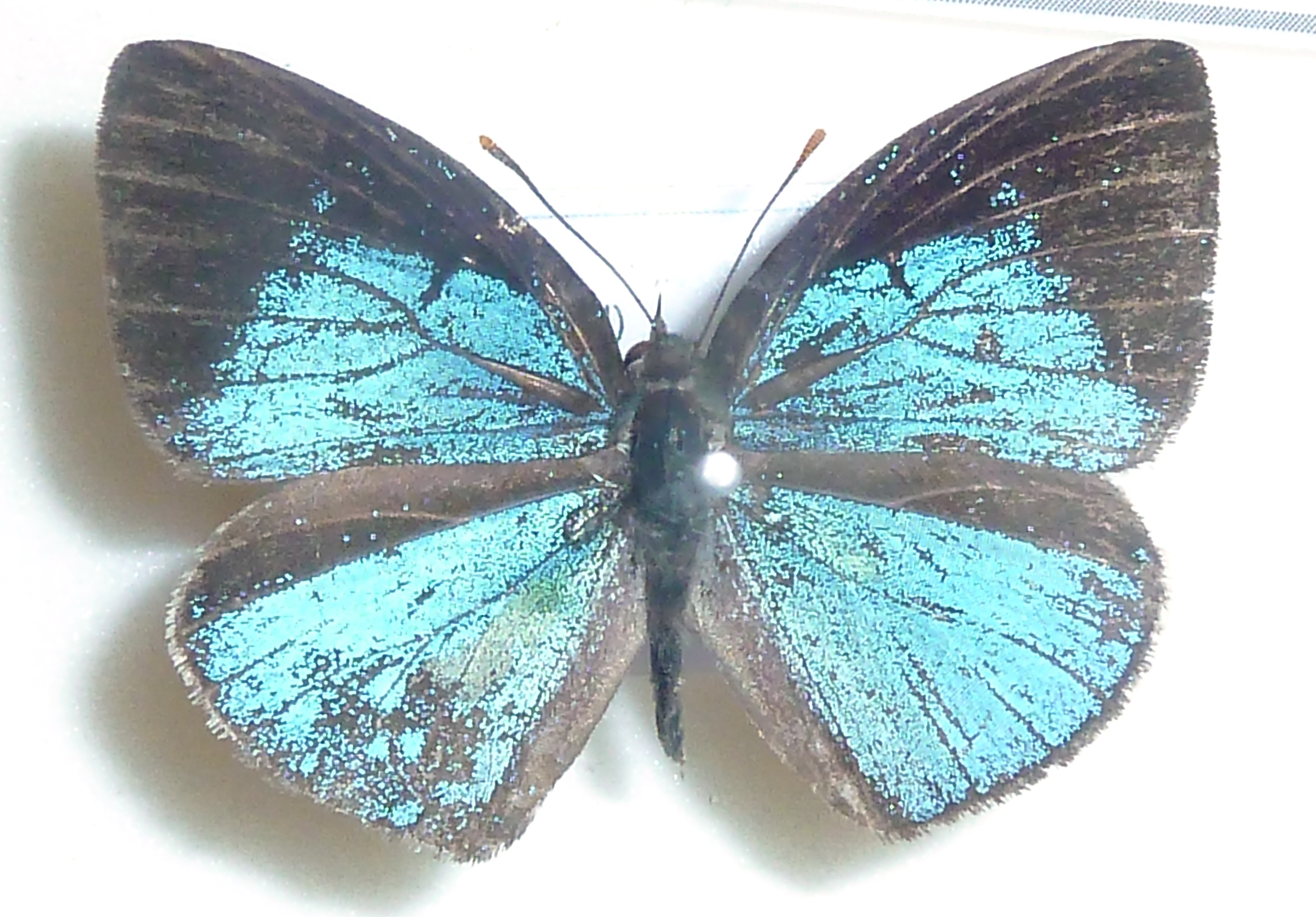

Scientific classification
- Domain: Eukaryota
- Kingdom: Animalia
- Phylum: Arthropoda
- Class: Insecta
- Order: Lepidoptera
- Family: Lycaenidae
- Genus: Stempfferia
- Species: S. ciconia

Binomial name
- Stempfferia ciconia (Grose-Smith & Kirby, 1892)

Synonyms
- Epitola ciconia Grose-Smith & Kirby, 1892; Stempfferia (Cercenia) ciconia; Epitola mongiro Jackson, 1968

= Stempfferia ciconia =

Stork epitola

Species of butterfly

Stempfferia ciconia, the stork epitola, is a butterfly in the family Lycaenidae. It is found in Sierra Leone, Ivory Coast, Ghana, Cameroon, the Democratic Republic of the Congo and Uganda. The habitat consists of forests.

== Subspecies ==
- Stempfferia ciconia ciconia (Sierra Leone, Ivory Coast, Ghana)
- Stempfferia ciconia camerunica Libert, 1999 (Cameroon)
- Stempfferia ciconia mongiro (Jackson, 1968) (eastern Democratic Republic of the Congo, Uganda)
