= Stempfferia annae =

Scientific classification
- Domain: Eukaryota
- Kingdom: Animalia
- Phylum: Arthropoda
- Class: Insecta
- Order: Lepidoptera
- Family: Lycaenidae
- Genus: Stempfferia
- Species: S. annae

Binomial name
- Stempfferia annae Libert, 1999

Synonyms
- Stempfferia (Cercenia) annae

Species of butterfly

Stempfferia annae, the Anne's epitola, is a butterfly in the family Lycaenidae. It is found in Nigeria (the Cross River loop), Cameroon, Gabon, the Republic of the Congo, the Central African Republic and the Democratic Republic of the Congo. The habitat consists of forests.
