= Stempfferia suzannae =

Scientific classification
- Kingdom: Animalia
- Phylum: Arthropoda
- Class: Insecta
- Order: Lepidoptera
- Family: Lycaenidae
- Genus: Stempfferia
- Species: S. suzannae

Binomial name
- Stempfferia suzannae (Berger, 1981)

Synonyms
- Epitola suzannae Berger, 1981; Stempfferia (Cercenia) suzannae

Species of butterfly

Stempfferia suzannae is a butterfly in the family Lycaenidae.
