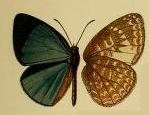

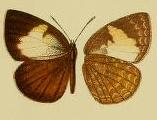

Scientific classification
- Domain: Eukaryota
- Kingdom: Animalia
- Phylum: Arthropoda
- Class: Insecta
- Order: Lepidoptera
- Family: Lycaenidae
- Genus: Stempfferia
- Species: S. cercenoides

Binomial name
- Stempfferia cercenoides (Holland, 1890)

Synonyms
- Epitola cercenoides Holland, 1890; Stempfferia (Cercenia) cercenoides; Epitola batesi Druce, 1910

= Stempfferia cercenoides =

Species of butterfly

Stempfferia cercenoides, the common epitola, is a butterfly in the family Lycaenidae. It is found in Nigeria (east and the Cross River loop), Cameroon, Gabon, the Republic of the Congo, the Central African Republic, the Democratic Republic of the Congo, southern Sudan, Uganda and north-western Tanzania. The habitat consists of forests.
