= Stempfferia congoana =

Scientific classification
- Domain: Eukaryota
- Kingdom: Animalia
- Phylum: Arthropoda
- Class: Insecta
- Order: Lepidoptera
- Family: Lycaenidae
- Genus: Stempfferia
- Species: S. congoana

Binomial name
- Stempfferia congoana (Aurivillius, 1923)

Synonyms
- Epitola congoana Aurivillius, 1923; Stempfferia (Cercenia) congoana; Epitola nigrovenata Jackson, 1962

Species of butterfly

Stempfferia congoana, the black-veined epitola, is a butterfly in the family Lycaenidae. It is found in Nigeria (the Cross River loop), Cameroon, Gabon, the Republic of the Congo, the Central African Republic and the Democratic Republic of the Congo. The habitat consists of forests.
