= Stempfferia katherinae =

Scientific classification
- Domain: Eukaryota
- Kingdom: Animalia
- Phylum: Arthropoda
- Class: Insecta
- Order: Lepidoptera
- Family: Lycaenidae
- Genus: Stempfferia
- Species: S. katherinae

Binomial name
- Stempfferia katherinae (Poulton, 1929)

Synonyms
- Epitola katherinae Poulton, 1929; Stempfferia (Cercenia) katherinae

Species of butterfly

Stempfferia katherinae, the Poulton's epitola, is a butterfly in the family Lycaenidae. It is found in southern Nigeria. The habitat consists of forests.
