= Stempfferia abri =

Scientific classification
- Kingdom: Animalia
- Phylum: Arthropoda
- Clade: Pancrustacea
- Class: Insecta
- Order: Lepidoptera
- Family: Lycaenidae
- Genus: Stempfferia
- Species: S. abri

Binomial name
- Stempfferia abri Libert & Collins, 1997

Synonyms
- Stempfferia (Stempfferia) abri

Species of butterfly

Stempfferia abri is a butterfly in the family Lycaenidae. It is found in Cameroon.
