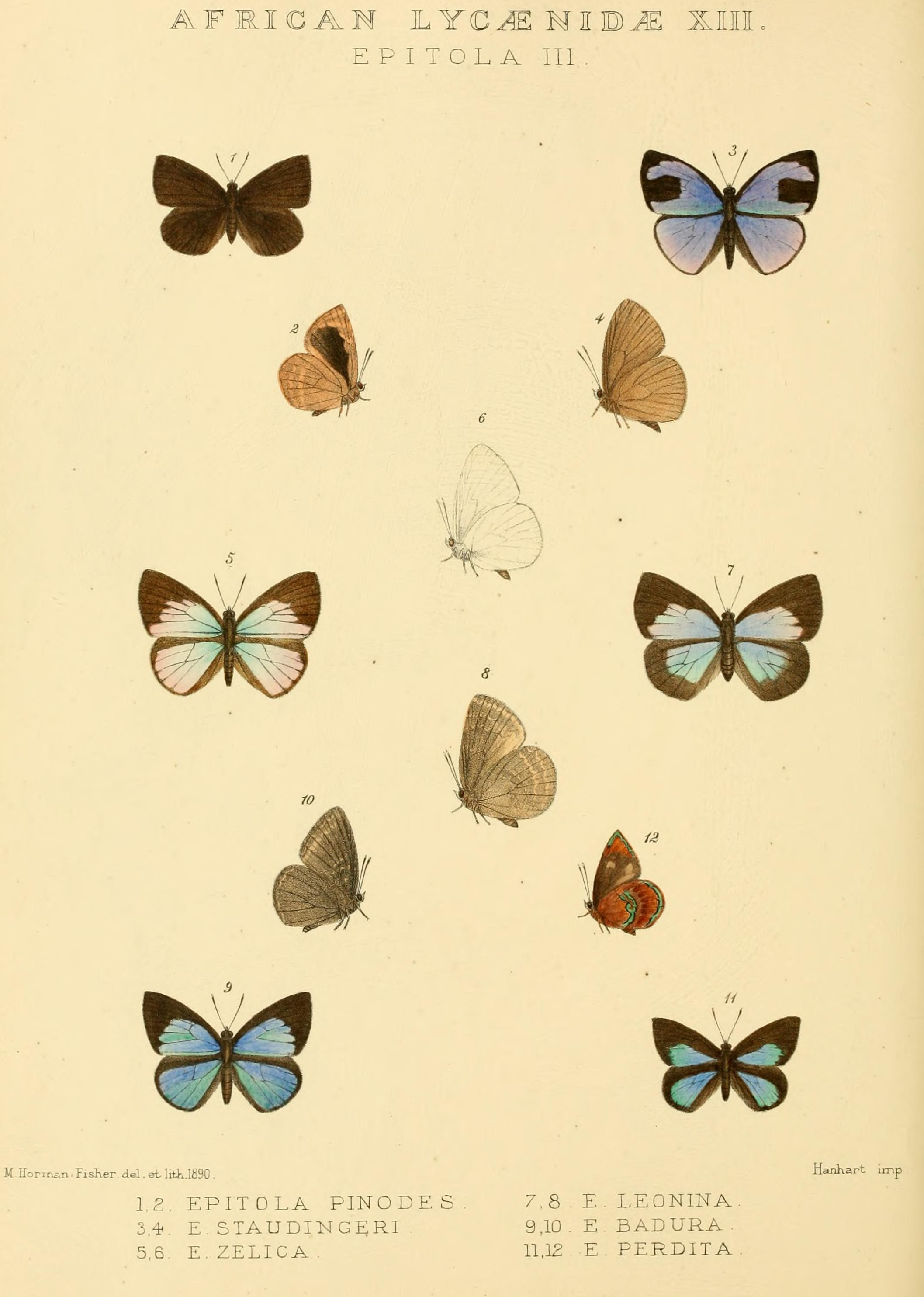

Scientific classification
- Domain: Eukaryota
- Kingdom: Animalia
- Phylum: Arthropoda
- Class: Insecta
- Order: Lepidoptera
- Family: Lycaenidae
- Genus: Stempfferia
- Species: S. staudingeri

Binomial name
- Stempfferia staudingeri (Kirby, 1890)

Synonyms
- Epitola staudingeri Kirby, 1890; Stempfferia (Cercenia) staudingeri

= Stempfferia staudingeri =

Species of butterfly

Stempfferia staudingeri, the black-square epitola, is a butterfly in the family Lycaenidae. It is found in Sierra Leone, Ivory Coast and Ghana. The habitat consists of forests.

== Etymology ==
The specific name honours Otto Staudinger.
