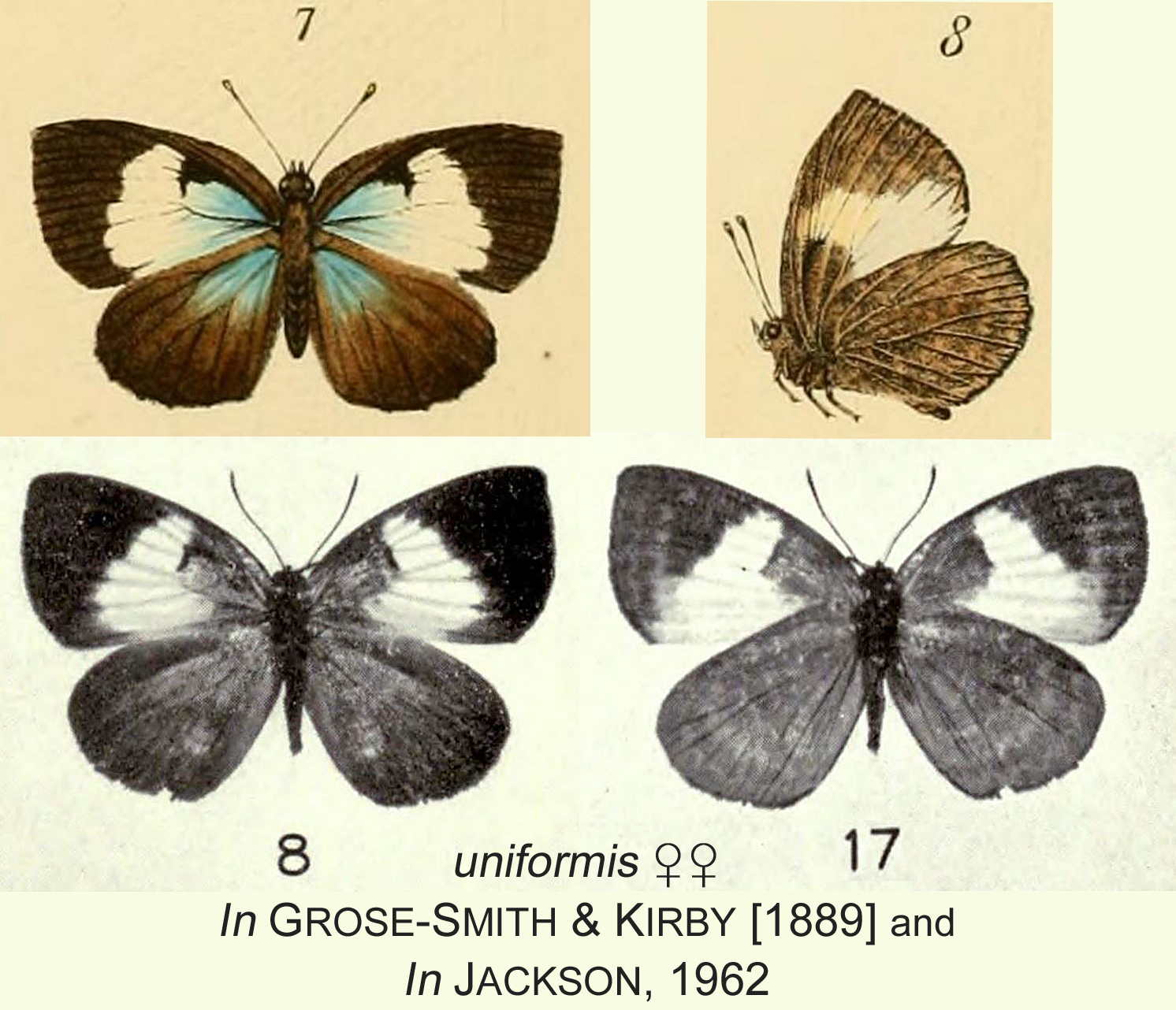

Scientific classification
- Domain: Eukaryota
- Kingdom: Animalia
- Phylum: Arthropoda
- Class: Insecta
- Order: Lepidoptera
- Family: Lycaenidae
- Genus: Stempfferia
- Species: S. uniformis

Binomial name
- Stempfferia uniformis (Kirby, 1887)

Synonyms
- Epitola uniformis Kirby, 1887; Stempfferia (Cercenia) uniformis; Epitola versicolor Kirby, 1887; Epitola ikoya Roche, 1954

= Stempfferia uniformis =

Species of butterfly

Stempfferia uniformis, the Ikoyi epitola, is a butterfly in the family Lycaenidae. It is found in Nigeria and possibly Cameroon and the Democratic Republic of the Congo. The habitat consists of forests.
