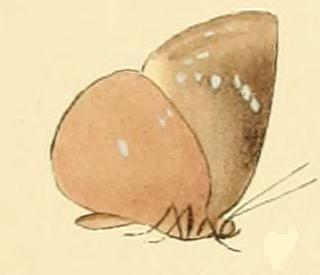

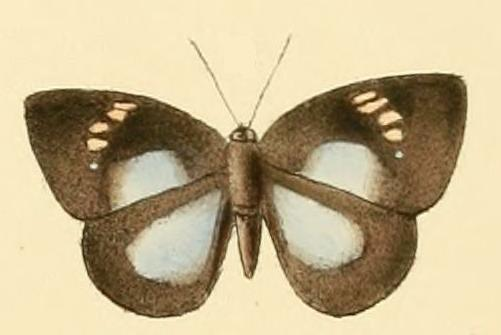

Scientific classification
- Domain: Eukaryota
- Kingdom: Animalia
- Phylum: Arthropoda
- Class: Insecta
- Order: Lepidoptera
- Family: Lycaenidae
- Genus: Stempfferia
- Species: S. carcina

Binomial name
- Stempfferia carcina (Hewitson, 1873)

Synonyms
- Epitola carcina Hewitson, 1873; Stempfferia (Cercenia) carcina; Epitola entebbeana Bethune-Baker, 1926; Epitola dunia Kirby, 1887

= Stempfferia carcina =

Species of butterfly

Stempfferia carcina, the dark furry epitola, is a butterfly in the family Lycaenidae. It is found in Nigeria (east and the Cross River loop) and Cameroon. The habitat consists of forests.
