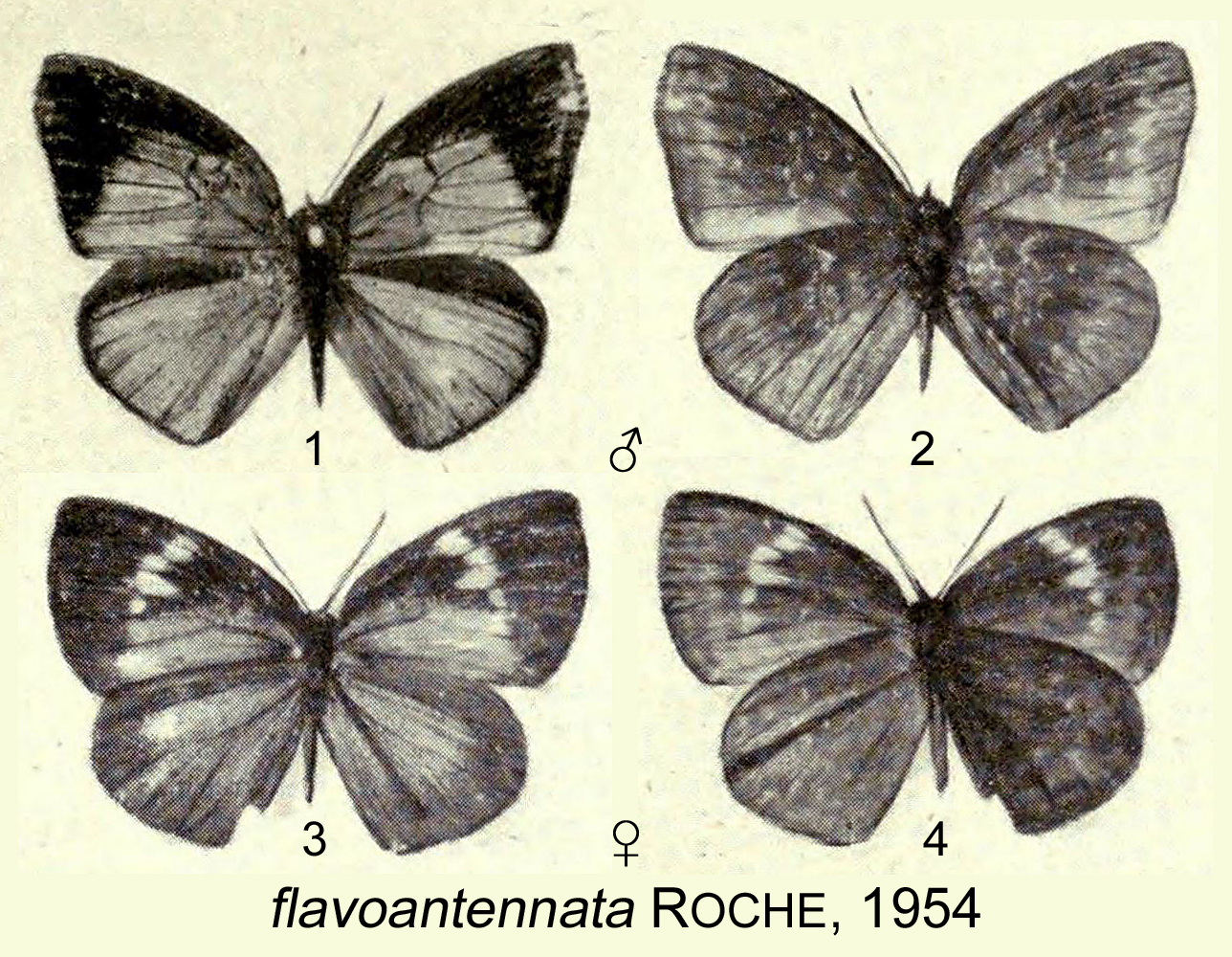

Scientific classification
- Domain: Eukaryota
- Kingdom: Animalia
- Phylum: Arthropoda
- Class: Insecta
- Order: Lepidoptera
- Family: Lycaenidae
- Genus: Stempfferia
- Species: S. flavoantennata

Binomial name
- Stempfferia flavoantennata (Roche, 1954)

Synonyms
- Epitola flavoantennata Roche, 1954; Stempfferia (Cercenia) flavoantennata

= Stempfferia flavoantennata =

Species of butterfly

Stempfferia flavoantennata is a butterfly in the family Lycaenidae. It is found in Cameroon, the Republic of the Congo and the Democratic Republic of the Congo.
