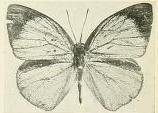

Scientific classification
- Kingdom: Animalia
- Phylum: Arthropoda
- Class: Insecta
- Order: Lepidoptera
- Family: Lycaenidae
- Genus: Stempfferia
- Species: S. iturina

Binomial name
- Stempfferia iturina (Joicey & Talbot, 1921)

Synonyms
- Epitola iturina Joicey & Talbot, 1921; Stempfferia (Cercenia) iturina; Epitola bella Aurivillius, 1923

= Stempfferia iturina =

Species of butterfly

Stempfferia iturina is a butterfly in the family Lycaenidae. It is found in Cameroon, the Republic of the Congo, Gabon and the Democratic Republic of the Congo.
