= Stempfferia insulana =

Scientific classification
- Domain: Eukaryota
- Kingdom: Animalia
- Phylum: Arthropoda
- Class: Insecta
- Order: Lepidoptera
- Family: Lycaenidae
- Genus: Stempfferia
- Species: S. insulana

Binomial name
- Stempfferia insulana (Aurivillius, 1923)

Synonyms
- Epitola insulana Aurivillius, 1923; Stempfferia (Cercenia) insulana; Epitola convexa Roche, 1954; Epitola intermedia Roche, 1954

Species of butterfly

Stempfferia insulana is a butterfly in the family Lycaenidae. It is found in Cameroon, Gabon, the Republic of the Congo, the Central African Republic, the Democratic Republic of the Congo, Uganda and north-western Tanzania.
