= Stempfferia francisci =

Scientific classification
- Domain: Eukaryota
- Kingdom: Animalia
- Phylum: Arthropoda
- Class: Insecta
- Order: Lepidoptera
- Family: Lycaenidae
- Genus: Stempfferia
- Species: S. francisci

Binomial name
- Stempfferia francisci Libert, 1999

Synonyms
- Stempfferia (Cercenia) flavoantennata

Species of butterfly

Stempfferia francisci, the brown epitola, is a butterfly in the family Lycaenidae. It is found in Nigeria. The habitat consists of forests.
