= Stempfferia baoule =

Scientific classification
- Domain: Eukaryota
- Kingdom: Animalia
- Phylum: Arthropoda
- Class: Insecta
- Order: Lepidoptera
- Family: Lycaenidae
- Genus: Stempfferia
- Species: S. baoule

Binomial name
- Stempfferia baoule Libert, 1999

Synonyms
- Stempfferia (Cercenia) baoule

Species of butterfly

Stempfferia baoule, the Baoule epitola, is a butterfly in the family Lycaenidae. It is found in Sierra Leone and Ivory Coast. The habitat consists of forests.
