= Stempfferia sylviae =

Scientific classification
- Domain: Eukaryota
- Kingdom: Animalia
- Phylum: Arthropoda
- Class: Insecta
- Order: Lepidoptera
- Family: Lycaenidae
- Genus: Stempfferia
- Species: S. sylviae

Binomial name
- Stempfferia sylviae Libert, 1999

Synonyms
- Stempfferia (Cercenia) sylviae

Species of butterfly

Stempfferia sylviae is a butterfly in the family Lycaenidae. It is found in the Republic of the Congo, the Central African Republic, the Democratic Republic of the Congo and Uganda.
