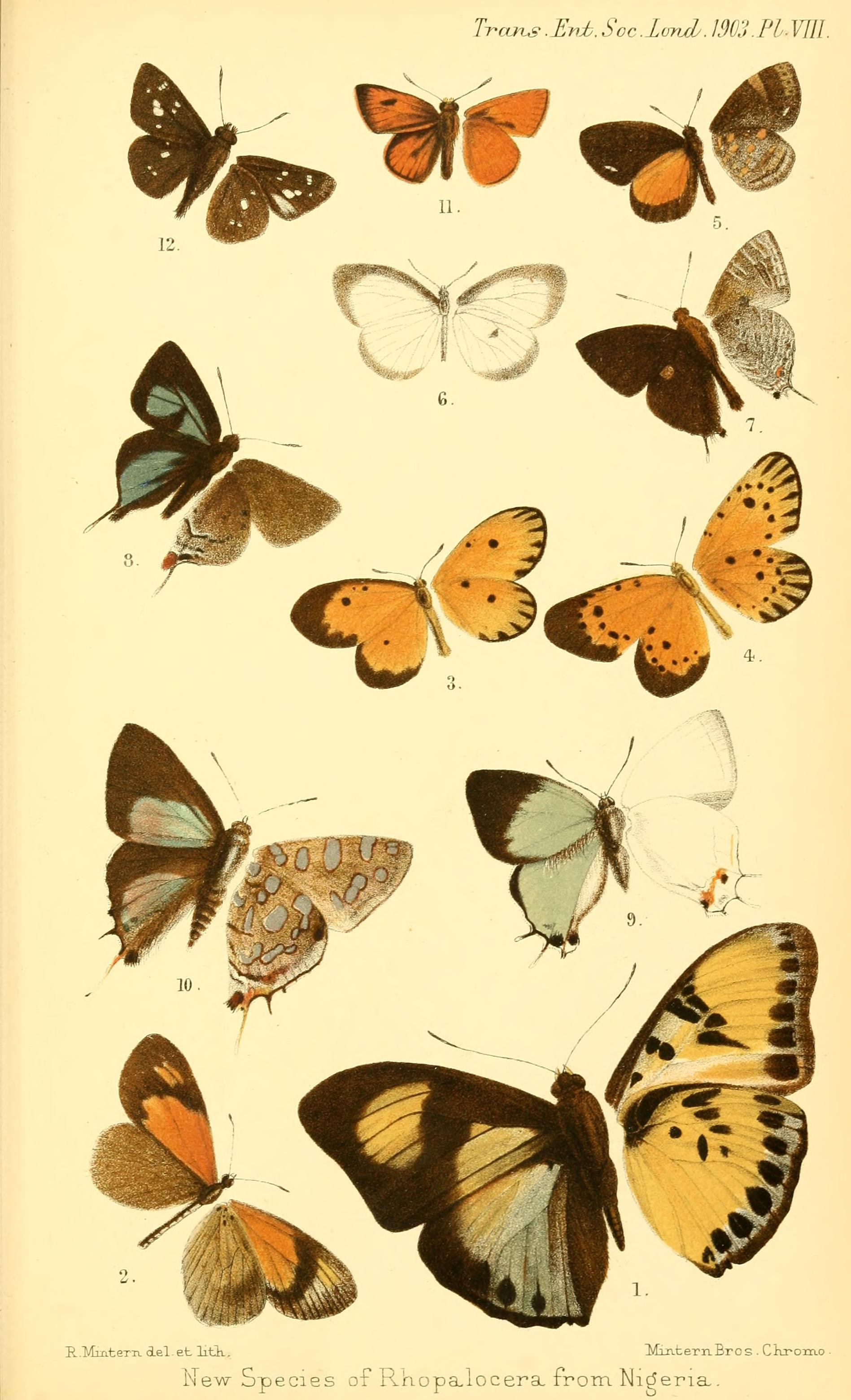
- Figure 5

Scientific classification
- Domain: Eukaryota
- Kingdom: Animalia
- Phylum: Arthropoda
- Class: Insecta
- Order: Lepidoptera
- Family: Lycaenidae
- Genus: Stempfferia
- Species: S. gordoni

Binomial name
- Stempfferia gordoni (H. H. Druce, 1903)

Synonyms
- Epitola gordoni H. H. Druce, 1903; Stempfferia (Cercinia) gordoni; Epitola staudingeri aequatorialis Jackson, 1962

= Stempfferia gordoni =

Species of butterfly

Stempfferia gordoni, the brown black-square epitola, is a butterfly in the family Lycaenidae. The family was first described by Hamilton Herbert Druce in 1903. It is found in Nigeria (east and the Cross River loop), Cameroon, Bioko, Gabon, the Republic of the Congo, the Central African Republic and the Democratic Republic of the Congo. The habitat consists of forests.
