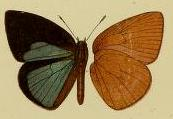

Scientific classification
- Domain: Eukaryota
- Kingdom: Animalia
- Phylum: Arthropoda
- Class: Insecta
- Order: Lepidoptera
- Family: Lycaenidae
- Genus: Stempfferia
- Species: S. tumentia

Binomial name
- Stempfferia tumentia (H. H. Druce, 1910)

Synonyms
- Epitola tumentia H. H. Druce, 1910; Stempfferia (Cercenia) tumentia

= Stempfferia tumentia =

Species of butterfly

Stempfferia tumentia, the swollen epitola, is a butterfly in the family Lycaenidae. The species was first described by Hamilton Herbert Druce in 1910. It is found in Nigeria (east and the Cross River loop), Cameroon, the Republic of the Congo, the Central African Republic and the Democratic Republic of the Congo. The habitat consists of forests.
