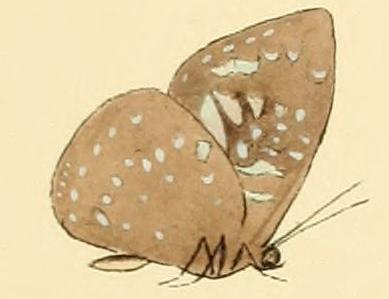

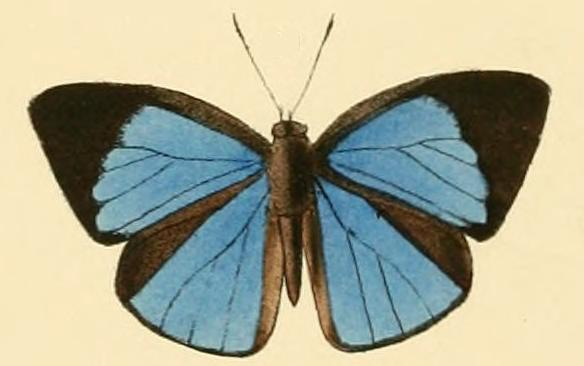

Scientific classification
- Domain: Eukaryota
- Kingdom: Animalia
- Phylum: Arthropoda
- Class: Insecta
- Order: Lepidoptera
- Family: Lycaenidae
- Genus: Stempfferia
- Species: S. cercene

Binomial name
- Stempfferia cercene (Hewitson, 1873)

Synonyms
- Epitola cercene Hewitson, 1873; Stempfferia (Cercenia) cercene; Epitola versicolor Kirby, 1887; Epitola convexa Roche, 1954

= Stempfferia cercene =

Species of butterfly

Stempfferia cercene, the cercene epitola, is a butterfly in the family Lycaenidae. It is found in Sierra Leone, Ghana, Nigeria (south and the Cross River loop), Cameroon, the Republic of the Congo, the Central African Republic, Angola, the Democratic Republic of the Congo, Uganda and north-western Tanzania. The habitat consists of forests.

Adult females oviposit on lichens on the bark of twigs and tree trunks. The larvae are attended by ants.
