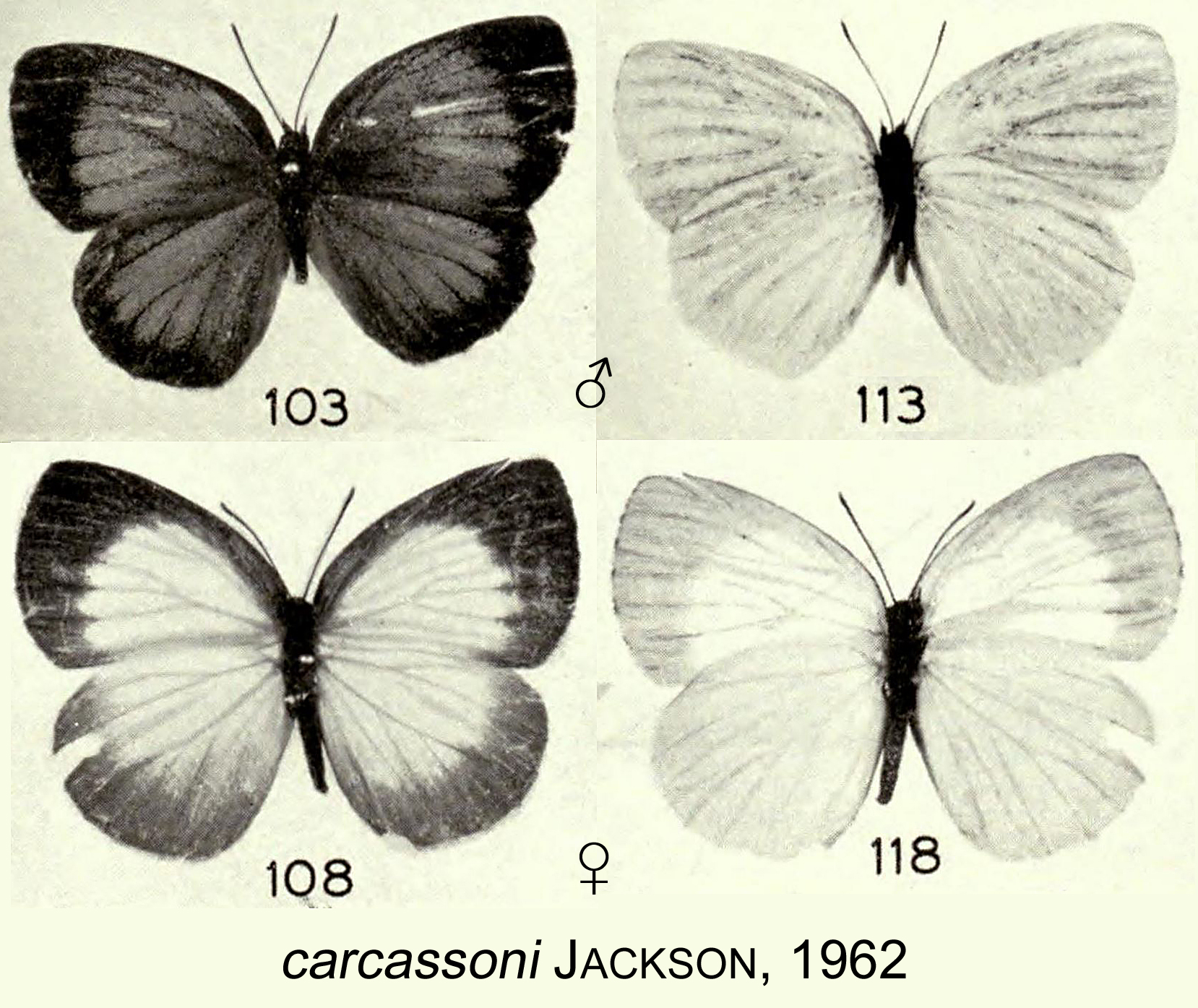
- Stempfferia carcassoni, Types, from original description.

Scientific classification
- Domain: Eukaryota
- Kingdom: Animalia
- Phylum: Arthropoda
- Class: Insecta
- Order: Lepidoptera
- Family: Lycaenidae
- Genus: Stempfferia
- Species: S. carcassoni

Binomial name
- Stempfferia carcassoni Jackson, 1962

Synonyms
- Stempfferia (Stempfferia) carcassoni

= Stempfferia carcassoni =

Species of butterfly

Stempfferia carcassoni is a butterfly in the family Lycaenidae. It is found in Cameroon, the Republic of the Congo and the Democratic Republic of the Congo.
