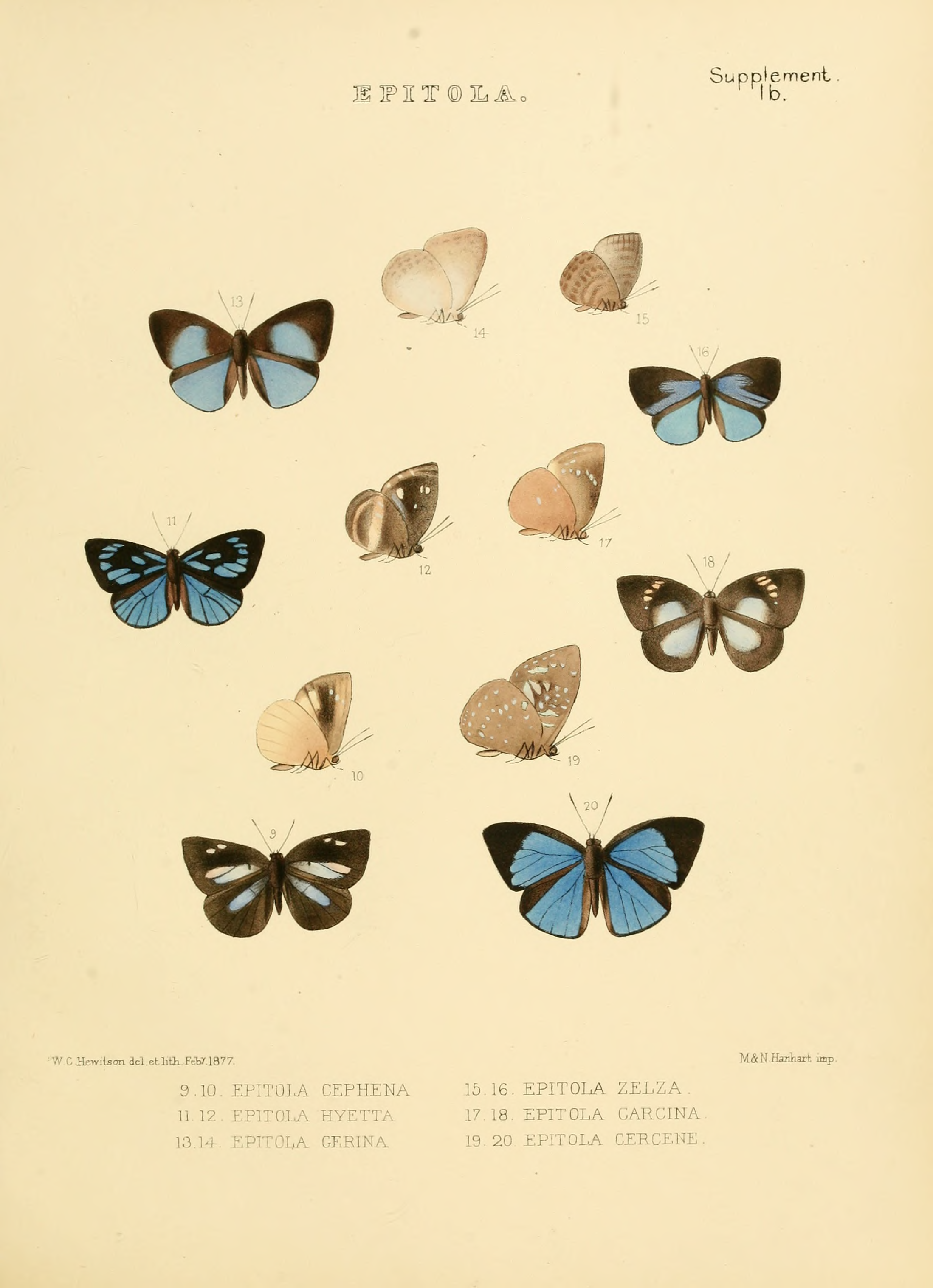
- S. zelza figures 15 and 16; S. carcina 17 and 18; S. cercene 19 and 20

Scientific classification
- Kingdom: Animalia
- Phylum: Arthropoda
- Clade: Pancrustacea
- Class: Insecta
- Order: Lepidoptera
- Family: Lycaenidae
- Subfamily: Poritiinae
- Genus: Stempfferia; Jackson, 1962

= Stempfferia =

Genus of butterflies

Stempfferia is a genus of butterflies in the family Lycaenidae. The species of this genus are endemic to the Afrotropical realm.

== Species ==
- Subgenus Stempfferia Jackson, 1962
  - Stempfferia abri Libert & Collins, 1997
  - Stempfferia carcassoni Jackson, 1962
- Subgenus Cercenia Libert, 1999
  - Stempfferia alba (Jackson, 1962)
  - Stempfferia annae Libert, 1999
  - Stempfferia badura (Kirby, 1890)
  - Stempfferia baoule Libert, 1999
  - Stempfferia boormani Libert, 1999
  - Stempfferia bouyeri Libert & Collins, 1999
  - Stempfferia carcina (Hewitson, 1873)
  - Stempfferia carilla (Roche, 1954)
  - Stempfferia cercene (Hewitson, 1873)
  - Stempfferia cercenoides (Holland, 1890)
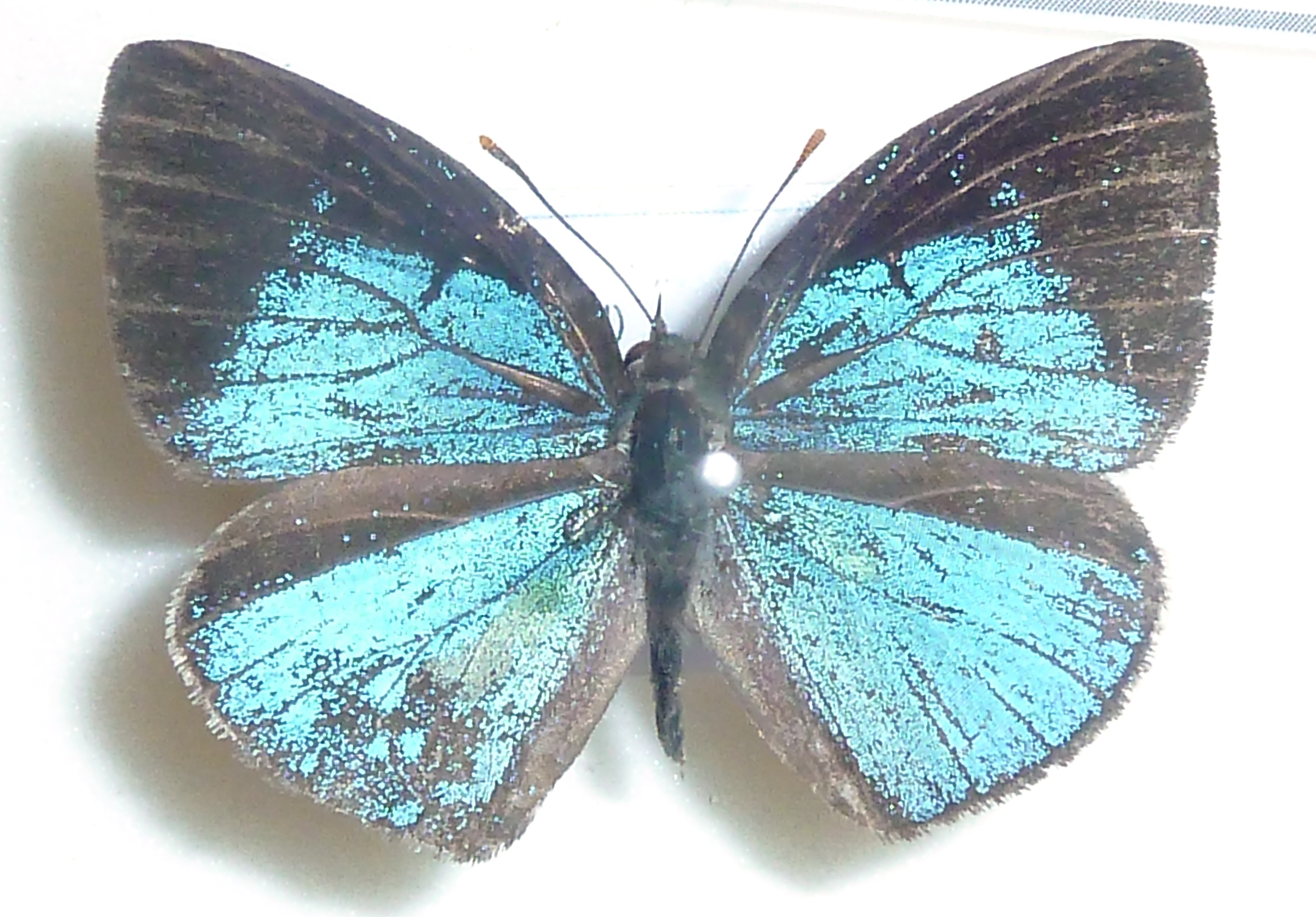
    S. ciconia
  - Stempfferia ciconia (Grose-Smith & Kirby, 1892)
  - Stempfferia cinerea (Berger, 1981)
  - Stempfferia coerulea (Jackson, 1962)
  - Stempfferia congoana (Aurivillius, 1923)
  - Stempfferia dorothea (Bethune-Baker, 1904)
  - Stempfferia elissa (Grose-Smith, 1898)
  - Stempfferia flavoantennata (Roche, 1954)
  - Stempfferia francisci Libert, 1999
  - Stempfferia ginettae Libert, 1999
  - Stempfferia gordoni (Druce, 1903)
  - Stempfferia ife Libert, 1999
  - Stempfferia insulana (Aurivillius, 1923)
  - Stempfferia iturina (Joicey & Talbot, 1921)
  - Stempfferia jolyana Libert & Bouyer, 1999
  - Stempfferia katherinae (Poulton, 1929)
  - Stempfferia kholifa (Bethune-Baker, 1904)
  - Stempfferia leonina (Staudinger, 1888)
  - Stempfferia liberti (Collins, 1998)
  - Stempfferia magnifica (Jackson, 1964)
  - Stempfferia mara (Talbot, 1935)
  - Stempfferia marginata (Kirby, 1887)
  - Stempfferia michelae Libert, 1999
  - Stempfferia moyambina (Bethune-Baker, 1903)
  - Stempfferia piersoni Libert & Bouyer, 1999
  - Stempfferia schultzei Libert, 1999
  - Stempfferia similis Libert, 1999
  - Stempfferia staudingeri (Kirby, 1890)
  - Stempfferia subtumescens Libert, 1999
  - Stempfferia suzannae (Berger, 1981)
  - Stempfferia sylviae Libert, 1999
  - Stempfferia tumentia (Druce, 1910)
  - Stempfferia uniformis (Kirby, 1887)
  - Stempfferia zelza (Hewitson, 1873)
