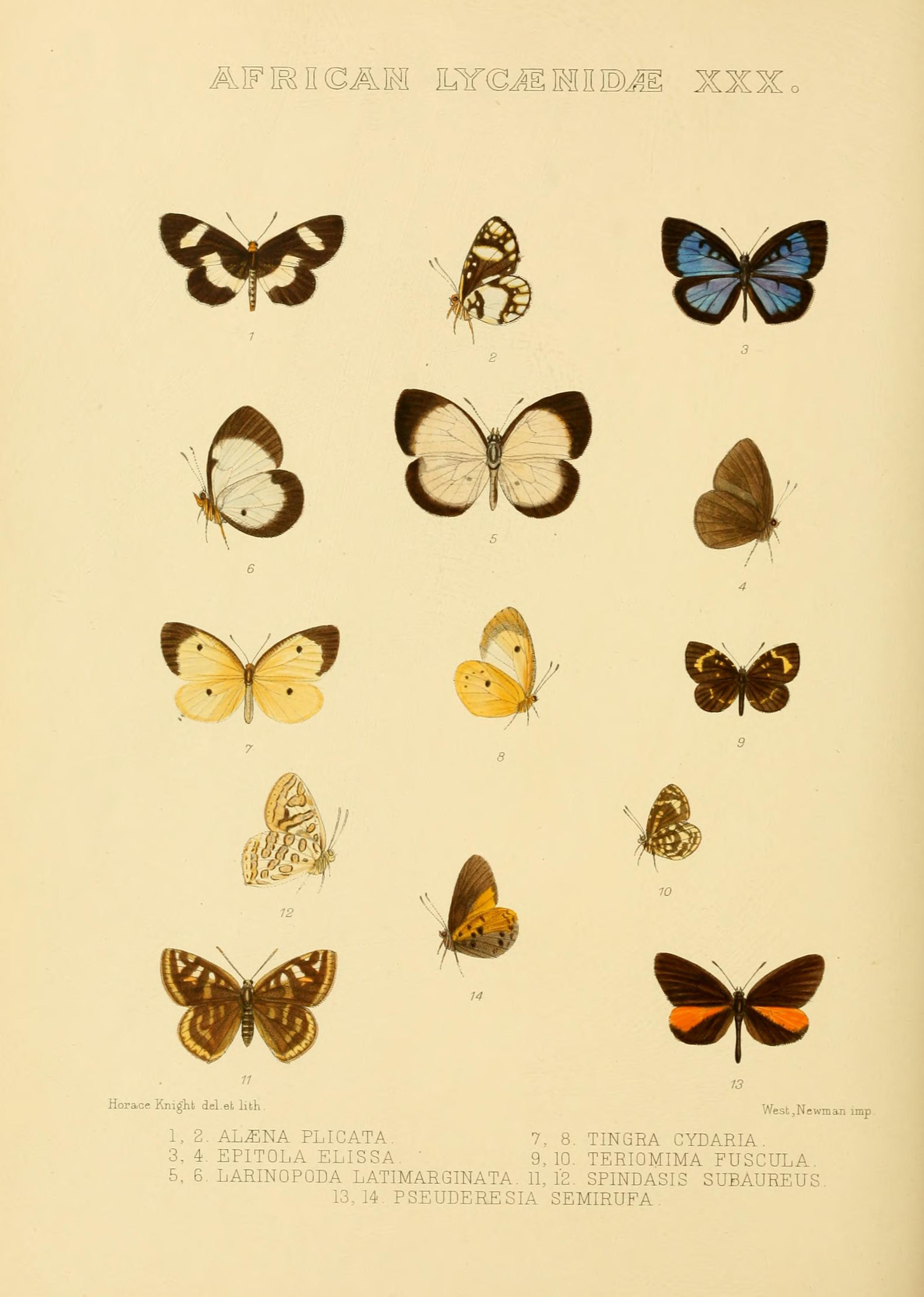
- Figures 3 and 4

Scientific classification
- Domain: Eukaryota
- Kingdom: Animalia
- Phylum: Arthropoda
- Class: Insecta
- Order: Lepidoptera
- Family: Lycaenidae
- Genus: Stempfferia
- Species: S. elissa

Binomial name
- Stempfferia elissa (Grose-Smith, 1898)

Synonyms
- Epitola elissa Grose-Smith, 1898; Stempfferia (Cercenia) elissa; Epitola oniensis Roche, 1954; Epitola pseudelissa Jackson, 1968

= Stempfferia elissa =

Species of butterfly

Stempfferia elissa, the Elissa epitola, is a butterfly in the family Lycaenidae. It is found in Nigeria and western Cameroon. The habitat consists of forests.
