= Stempfferia coerulea =

Scientific classification
- Domain: Eukaryota
- Kingdom: Animalia
- Phylum: Arthropoda
- Class: Insecta
- Order: Lepidoptera
- Family: Lycaenidae
- Genus: Stempfferia
- Species: S. coerulea

Binomial name
- Stempfferia coerulea (Jackson, 1962)

Synonyms
- Epitola coerulea Jackson, 1962; Stempfferia (Cercenia) coerulea

Species of butterfly

Stempfferia coerulea is a butterfly in the family Lycaenidae. It is found in Cameroon, the Republic of the Congo, the Central African Republic and the Democratic Republic of the Congo.

== Subspecies ==
- Stempfferia coerulea coerulea (Congo, Democratic Republic of the Congo)
- Stempfferia coerulea pierri Libert, 1999 (Cameroon, Central African Republic)
