= Stempfferia liberti =

Scientific classification
- Kingdom: Animalia
- Phylum: Arthropoda
- Class: Insecta
- Order: Lepidoptera
- Family: Lycaenidae
- Genus: Stempfferia
- Species: S. liberti

Binomial name
- Stempfferia liberti (Collins, 1998)

Synonyms
- Epitola liberti Collins, 1998; Stempfferia (Cercenia) liberti

Species of butterfly

Stempfferia liberti is a butterfly in the family Lycaenidae. It is found in Cameroon. The habitat consists of riverine mosaic forest along the Nyong River.
