= Stempfferia carilla =

Scientific classification
- Domain: Eukaryota
- Kingdom: Animalia
- Phylum: Arthropoda
- Class: Insecta
- Order: Lepidoptera
- Family: Lycaenidae
- Genus: Stempfferia
- Species: S. carilla

Binomial name
- Stempfferia carilla (Roche, 1954)

Synonyms
- Epitola carilla Roche, 1954; Stempfferia (Cercenia) carilla

Species of butterfly

Stempfferia carilla is a butterfly in the family Lycaenidae. It is found in Uganda.
