= Stempfferia subtumescens =

Scientific classification
- Domain: Eukaryota
- Kingdom: Animalia
- Phylum: Arthropoda
- Class: Insecta
- Order: Lepidoptera
- Family: Lycaenidae
- Genus: Stempfferia
- Species: S. subtumescens

Binomial name
- Stempfferia subtumescens Libert, 1999

Synonyms
- Stempfferia (Cercenia) subtumescens

Species of butterfly

Stempfferia subtumescens, the toothed epitola, is a butterfly in the family Lycaenidae. It is found in Nigeria. The habitat consists of forests.
