= Stempfferia similis =

Scientific classification
- Domain: Eukaryota
- Kingdom: Animalia
- Phylum: Arthropoda
- Class: Insecta
- Order: Lepidoptera
- Family: Lycaenidae
- Genus: Stempfferia
- Species: S. similis

Binomial name
- Stempfferia similis Libert, 1999

Synonyms
- Stempfferia (Cercenia) similis

Species of butterfly

Stempfferia similis is a butterfly in the family Lycaenidae. It is found in Cameroon, the Republic of the Congo, the Central African Republic and Gabon.
