= Stempfferia alba =

Scientific classification
- Domain: Eukaryota
- Kingdom: Animalia
- Phylum: Arthropoda
- Class: Insecta
- Order: Lepidoptera
- Family: Lycaenidae
- Genus: Stempfferia
- Species: S. alba

Binomial name
- Stempfferia alba (Jackson, 1962)

Synonyms
- Epitola alba Jackson, 1962; Stempfferia (Cercenia) alba

Species of butterfly

Stempfferia alba is a butterfly in the family Lycaenidae. It is found in Cameroon and the Republic of the Congo.
