= Stempfferia piersoni =

Scientific classification
- Kingdom: Animalia
- Phylum: Arthropoda
- Class: Insecta
- Order: Lepidoptera
- Family: Lycaenidae
- Genus: Stempfferia
- Species: S. piersoni

Binomial name
- Stempfferia piersoni Libert & Bouyer, 1999

Synonyms
- Stempfferia (Cercenia) piersoni

Species of butterfly

Stempfferia piersoni is a butterfly in the family Lycaenidae. It is found in Cameroon.
