= Stempfferia marginata =

Scientific classification
- Domain: Eukaryota
- Kingdom: Animalia
- Phylum: Arthropoda
- Class: Insecta
- Order: Lepidoptera
- Family: Lycaenidae
- Genus: Stempfferia
- Species: S. marginata

Binomial name
- Stempfferia marginata (Kirby, 1887)

Synonyms
- Epitola marginata Kirby, 1887; Stempfferia (Cercenia) marginata; Epitola umbratilis Holland, 1890

Species of butterfly

Stempfferia marginata, the scalloped epitola, is a butterfly in the family Lycaenidae. It is found in Nigeria (south and the Cross River loop), Cameroon, Gabon, the Republic of the Congo, the Central African Republic, the Democratic Republic of the Congo and Uganda. The habitat consists of forests.
