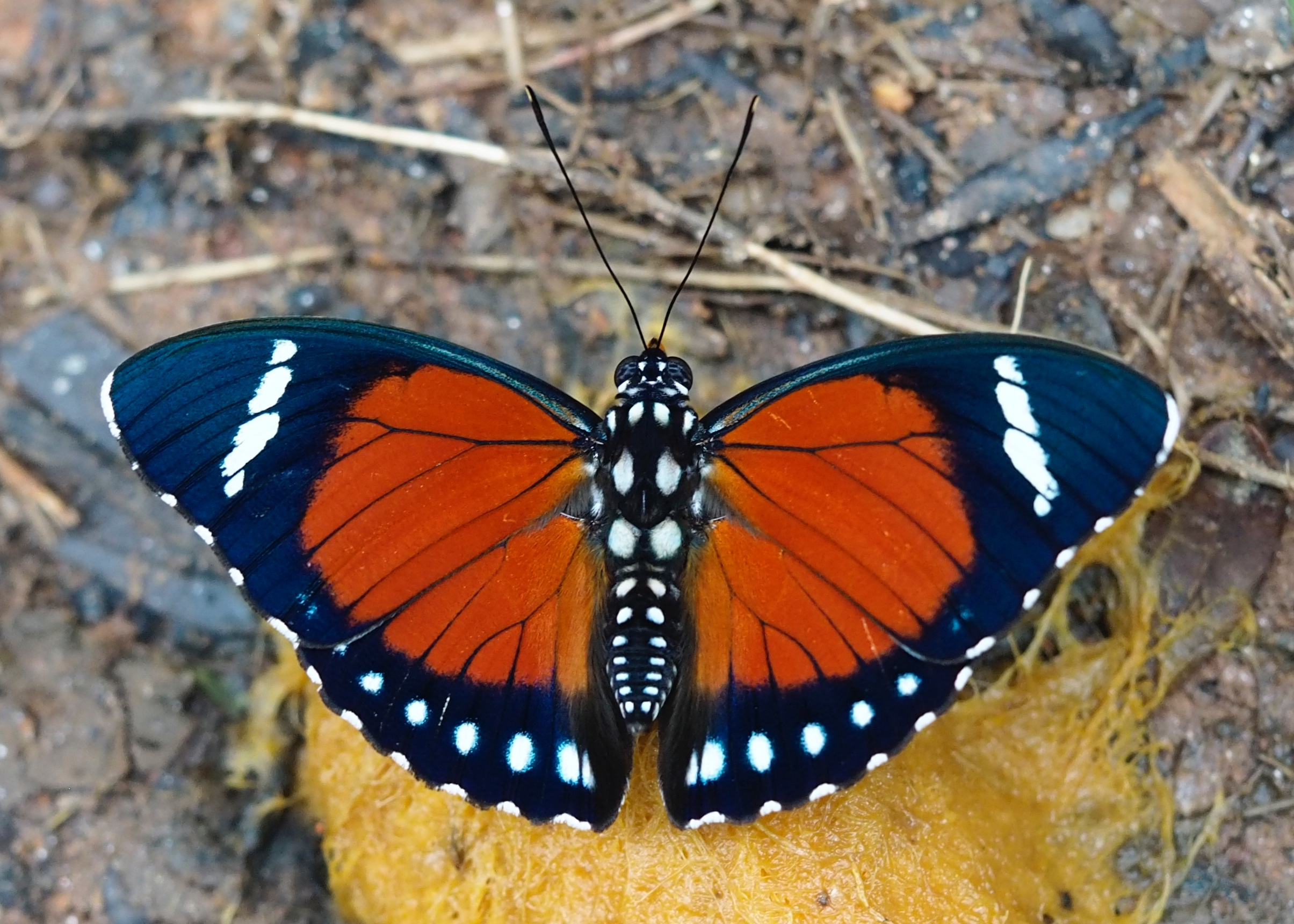
- in Ankasa Conservation Area, Ghana
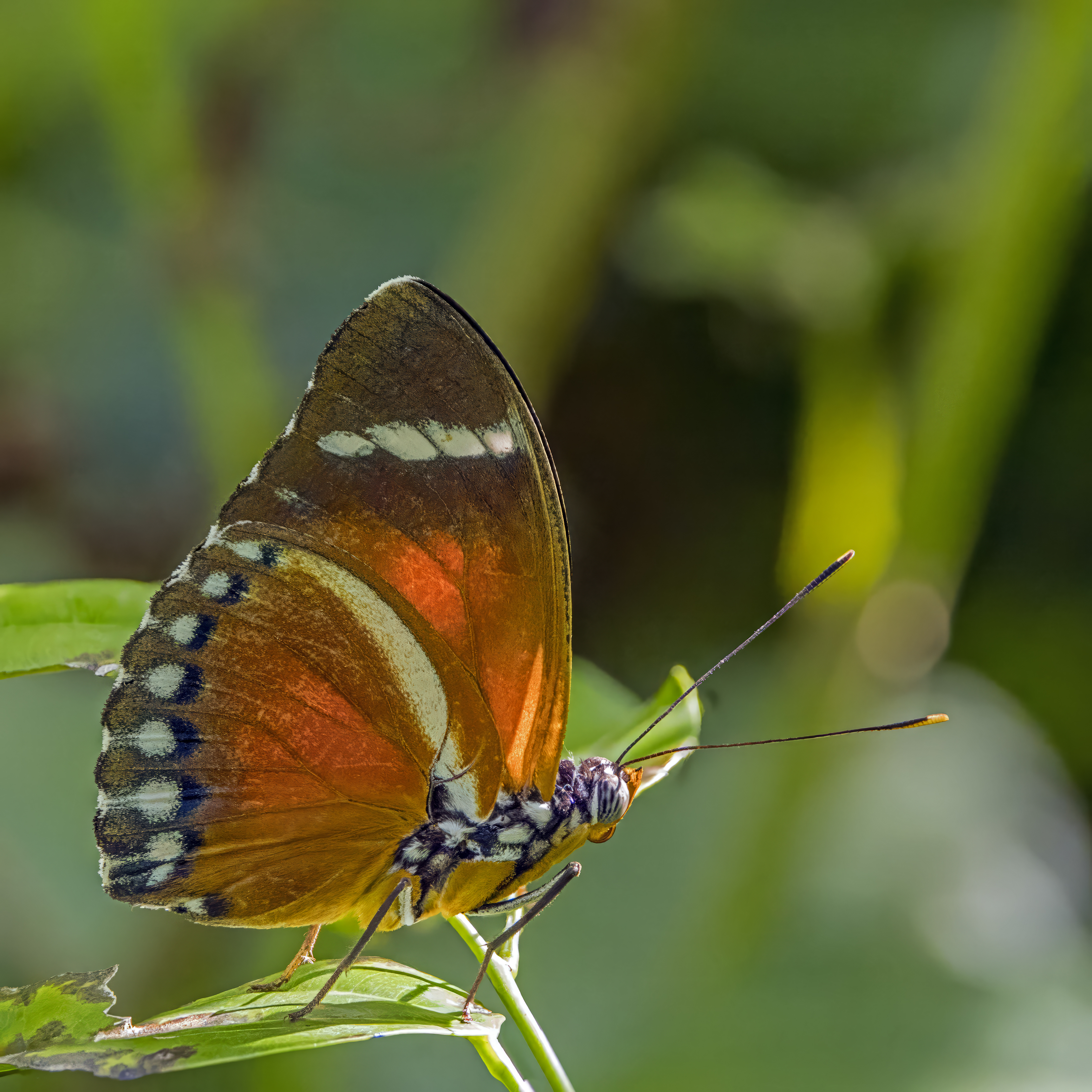
- Nyamebe Bepo Forest Reserve, Ghana

Scientific classification
- Kingdom: Animalia
- Phylum: Arthropoda
- Clade: Pancrustacea
- Class: Insecta
- Order: Lepidoptera
- Family: Nymphalidae
- Genus: Euphaedra
- Species: E. eleus

Binomial name
- Euphaedra eleus (Drury, 1782)

Synonyms
- Papilio eleus Drury, 1782; Euphaedra (Euphaedrana) eleus

= Euphaedra eleus =

Species of butterfly

Euphaedra eleus, the Eleus orange forester, is a butterfly in the family Nymphalidae. It is found in Guinea, Sierra Leone, Liberia, Ivory Coast, Ghana, Nigeria, Cameroon, Gabon, the Republic of the Congo, Angola, the Democratic Republic of the Congo and Uganda. The habitat consists of primary forests and secondary forests with a closed canopy.

Adults mimic the day-flying moth Scopula helcita.

The larvae feed on Phialodiscus unijugatus, Deinbollia, Allophylus and Paullinia species.

== Description ==
Upperside. Antennae black, with two small white spots at the base. Thorax and abdomen]] black, spotted with two rows of white spots, in pairs, from the neck to the anus; those on the abdomen being the least. Half the superior wings next the tips black, with two white streaks thereon placed obliquely; the other half next to the body dirty orange, the anterior edges being black. Posterior wings dirty orange, bordered along the external edges with black, whereon is a row of seven oval white spots on each wing, placed at equal distances.

Underside. Palpi and breast orange. Forelegs orange, the rest white. Wings on this side dark orange coloured. The white streaks near the tips of the anterior ones are very plain. Anterior edges of the posterior wings white, and the row of white spots along the external edges are here very conspicuous, each being verged with black. Wingspan 3 1/2 inches (88 mm).

== Description in Seitz ==
E. eleus is very variable and is distinguished at once from Euphaedra ruspina and Euphaedra edwardsi by the underside of the hindwing having at the costal margin a broad white longitudinal stripe, just as in E. preussi, beginning at the base and almost entirely filling up cellule 7 as far as the submarginal spot. The submarginal spots of the hindwing are pure white and the cell entirely without a spot at the end; the subapical band of the forewing is narrow, above white or yellow, beneath always white. - zampa [now species Euphaedra zampa ] Westw. (42 c). Forewing above unicolorous light bluish grey-green, with very narrow, sometimes interrupted, white subapical band and white apical spot; hindwing above similarly coloured, only occasionally tinged with red-yellow in the cell, and with very broad, white-spotted marginal band. Beneath both wings are red-yellow, at the distal margin more or less greenish grey; cell of the forewing with 3, of the hindwing with one black dot. Sierra Leone. - ab. ferruginea Stgr.[ now species Euphaedra ferruginea ] only differs in having the hindwing above brown-red to beyond the middle and only close to the marginal band narrowly greenish. Old Calabar, Cameroons. - ab. rattrayi E. Sharpe [now species Euphaedra rattrayi ] is another near ally of eleus, apparently only differing in having the forewing above brown-red near the base. Uganda.- eleus Drury (42 b; erroneously called ruspina). Both wings above in the basal half red-brown to yellow-brown; the apex of the fore wing without white spot, only the fringes white. The apical part of the forewing and the marginal band of the hindwing above black or black-blue; the cell of the forewing above without black dots; the black colour of the forewing does not reach the base of vein 3. Sierra Leone to Angola and Uganda. ab. hybrida Auriv.[ now species Euphaedra hybrida ] . The apical part of the forewing and the marginal band of the hindwing are tinged with greenish; the apical part of the forewing is narrower and does not cover the base of cellules 4 and 5, which is orange- yellow for a breadth of about 5 mm., the subapical band of the fore wing above is light yellow and irregular, the spot in cellule 3 being punctiform and that in 4 much larger than the others; otherwise agrees with eleus Congo.- ab. coprates Druce [ now species Euphaedra coprates(42 a, as hybridus; 42 b). The cell of the forewing above with 2 black dots; the marginal band of the hindwing and the apical part of the forewing above more or less tinged with greenish; otherwise similar to E. eleus. Congo and Angola. - ab. orientalis [now species Euphaedra orientalis Rothsch. only differs from eleus in having the white subapical band of the fore wing broader, the black apical part of the upperside of the forewing extending to the base of vein 3 and in the presence of two black spots in the cell of the forewing above, as in coprates. Congo and German East Africa.

== Subspecies ==
- Euphaedra eleus eleus (Guinea, Sierra Leone, Liberia, Ivory Coast, Ghana, Nigeria, Cameroon, Gabon, Congo, northern Angola, Democratic Republic of the Congo, western Uganda)
- Euphaedra eleus gigas Hecq, 1996 (south-eastern Democratic Republic of the Congo)

Torben Larsen developed a species numbering system for his 2005 publication Butterflies of West Africa. The nominate subspecies is #1108. The 'Larsen' numbers have since been used with permission in A Sharp Eye on Butterflies of Ghana.

== Similar species ==
Other members of the Euphaedra eleus species group q.v.
