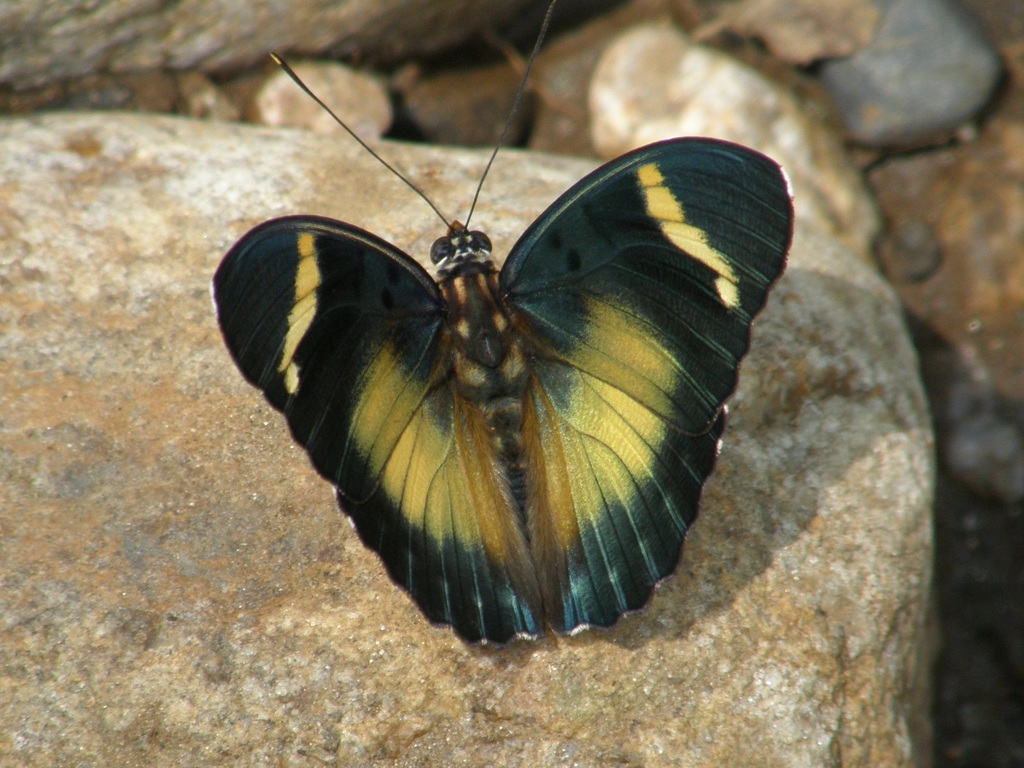

Scientific classification
- Kingdom: Animalia
- Phylum: Arthropoda
- Class: Insecta
- Order: Lepidoptera
- Family: Nymphalidae
- Genus: Euphaedra
- Species: E. neumanni

Binomial name
- Euphaedra neumanni Rothschild, 1902

Synonyms
- Euphaedra (Euphaedrana) neumanni; Euphaedra preussi perochrata Ungemach, 1932; Euphaedra cooksoni attenuata Gabriel, 1949

= Euphaedra neumanni =

Species of butterfly

Euphaedra neumanni is a butterfly in the family Nymphalidae. It is found in south-western Ethiopia and southern Sudan. It is a member of the Euphaedra preussi species group q.v.
