= Euphaedra orientalis =

Scientific classification
- Kingdom: Animalia
- Phylum: Arthropoda
- Class: Insecta
- Order: Lepidoptera
- Family: Nymphalidae
- Genus: Euphaedra
- Species: E. orientalis

Binomial name
- Euphaedra orientalis Rothschild, 1898

Synonyms
- Euphaedra eleus orientalis Rothschild, 1898; Euphaedra (Euphaedrana) orientalis; Euphaedra eleus nguruensis Stoneham, 1956

Species of butterfly

Euphaedra orientalis, the orange forester, is a butterfly in the family Nymphalidae. It is found along the coast of Kenya and in eastern Tanzania, Malawi, Mozambique (from the northern coast to Beira) and eastern Zimbabwe. The habitat consists of dense forests.

Adults are attracted by fermenting bananas and ripe wild figs on the forest floor.

The larvae possibly feed on Blighia unijugata and Phoenix reclinata.

== Original description ==
4. Euphaedra eleus orientalis subsp. nov.

Male :upperside : forewing, subapical band half as wide again as in the common West African form; the black area more extended, its inner edge crossing median nervure at origin of vein 3 and being 1.5 mm. distant from outer margin at vein 2; two black dots in cell. Hindwing, submarginal blue and white dots smaller than in eleus eleus.

Underside : forewing, subapical band as broad as above, an interrupted black line at apex of cell, and three black dots in cell. Hindwing with two black dots in cell and three white patches on disc; submarginal spots smaller than in eleus.

Bab. Mikindani, German East Africa, between January and May 1897, 1 male (Reimer).

== Similar species ==
Other members of the Euphaedra eleus species group q.v.
