= Euphaedra olivacea =

Scientific classification
- Kingdom: Animalia
- Phylum: Arthropoda
- Class: Insecta
- Order: Lepidoptera
- Family: Nymphalidae
- Genus: Euphaedra
- Species: E. olivacea

Binomial name
- Euphaedra olivacea Grünberg, 1908

Synonyms
- Euphaedra preussi var. olivacea Grünberg, 1908; Euphaedra (Euphaedrana) olivacea; Euphaedra preussi sordida Talbot, 1929

Species of butterfly

Euphaedra olivacea is a butterfly in the family Nymphalidae. It is found in central and western Uganda.

It is a member of the Euphaedra preussi species group q.v. ab. olivacea Grunb. Seitz - has the upper surface uniformly dark except for the white subapical band, without a trace of light or dark submarginal spots on the hindwing and the under surface quite as uniform brownish green with the black cell-spots much reduced. Uganda.It was described as an aberration of preussi later raised to a species by Carcasson.
