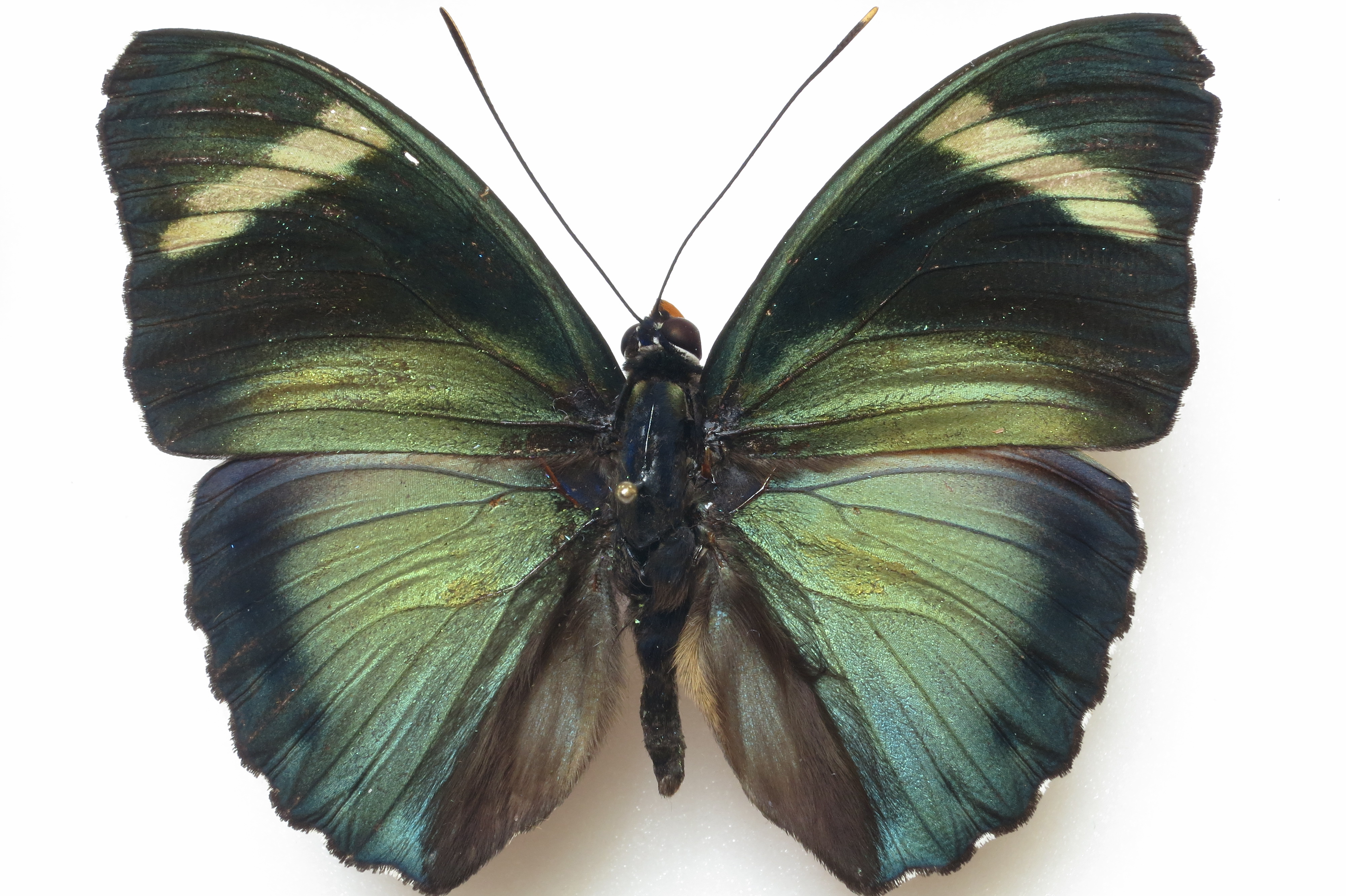

Scientific classification
- Kingdom: Animalia
- Phylum: Arthropoda
- Class: Insecta
- Order: Lepidoptera
- Family: Nymphalidae
- Genus: Euphaedra
- Species: E. preussi

Binomial name
- Euphaedra preussi Staudinger, 1891

Synonyms
- Euphaedra (Euphaedrana) preussi; Euphaedra preussi var. njami Staudinger, 1891; Euphaedra preussi var. njamnjami Staudinger, 1891; Euphaedra peculiaris ab. albovittata Aurivillius, 1912; Euphaedra preussi ab. ochrofasciata Rebel, 1914; Euphaedra preussi var. albipunctata Gaede, 1916; Euphaedra preussi var. marginemaculata Gaede, 1916; Euphaedra preussi var. flavofasciata Gaede, 1916; Euphaedra × scintillans Schultze, 1920 (hybrid of E. preussi or E. ravola and E. eleus); Euphaedra × perturbans Schultze, 1920 (hybrid of E. preussi and E. eleus); Euphaedra × monticola Schultze, 1920 (hybrid of E. preussi and E. eleus); Euphaedra × versicolora Schultze, 1920 (hybrid of E. preussi and E. eleus); Euphaedra preussi var. notata Holland, 1920; Euphaedra preussi var. latefasciata Holland, 1920; Euphaedra preussi f. obsoleta Joicey and Talbot, 1921; Euphaedra preussi f. lacteata Talbot, 1929; Euphaedra preussi preussi ab. nigrodiscalis Birket-Smith, 1960

= Euphaedra preussi =

Species of butterfly

Euphaedra preussi is a butterfly in the family Nymphalidae. It is found in Cameroon, the Central African Republic, the Democratic Republic of the Congo, Angola and Uganda.

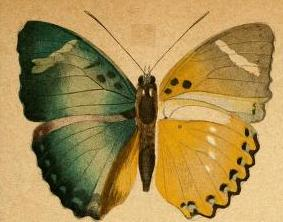
Deutsche Entomologische Zeitschrift (Iris, Dresden) Plate 1 Otto Staudinger, 1891 Neue exotische Lepidopteren

== Description ==
E. preussi differs from all the other forms of the subgroup in having a broad white longitudinal band, sometimes tinged with bluish, at the costal margin of the- hindwing beneath, covering the base of this margin and then in cellule 7 extending far beyond the middle; the under surface has no black discal spots and the submarginal spots are small or entirely absent; the subapical band of the forewing is always narrow, in the male often very narrow, of uniform breadth, more or less broken up into spots and white, or in the male greenish; the green or bluish hindmarginal spot on the upperside of the forewing is large, reaching at least to vein 2. preussi Stgr. (42 d). The forewing above sometimes dark green almost throughout, with two black dots in the cell, sometimes deep black transversely across the middle, as is usual in the species of this group; the ground colour of the under surface is very inconstant, varying from greenish to yellowish and ochre-brown; the sub marginal spots are distinct on the hindwing and in cellule 1 b of the forewing. Cameroons to Angola and the Albert Nyanza. -ab. njami Stgr. has the forewing blacker above, not greenish in the apical part, and the under surface dark rust-brown with distinct submarginal spots. Njam-Njam-Land. -ab. njamnjami Stgr. only differs from njami in the entire absence of the submarginal spots on the under surface. Njam-Njam-Land. - ab. olivacea Grunb. [ now species Euphaedra olivacea] has the upper surface uniformly dark except for the white subapical band, without a trace of light or dark submarginal spots on the hindwing and the under surface quite as uniform brownish green with the black cell-spots much reduced. Uganda.-ab. neumanni Rothsch. [now species Euphaedra neumanni ] is distinguished by having on the upper surface an ill-defined yellowish nebulous band, running from the apex of the cell of the forewing to the hindmargin and across the middle of the hindwing, thus restricting the greenish colour; the hindwing with distinct submarginal spots above and beneath; the under surface light grey-green. Abyssinia.

== Subspecies ==
- Euphaedra preussi preussi (Cameroon, Central African Republic, Democratic Republic of the Congo, Angola, Uganda)
- Euphaedra preussi pallida Hecq, 1984 (Democratic Republic of the Congo: Shaba)

== Similar species ==
Other members of the Euphaedra preussi species group q.v.
