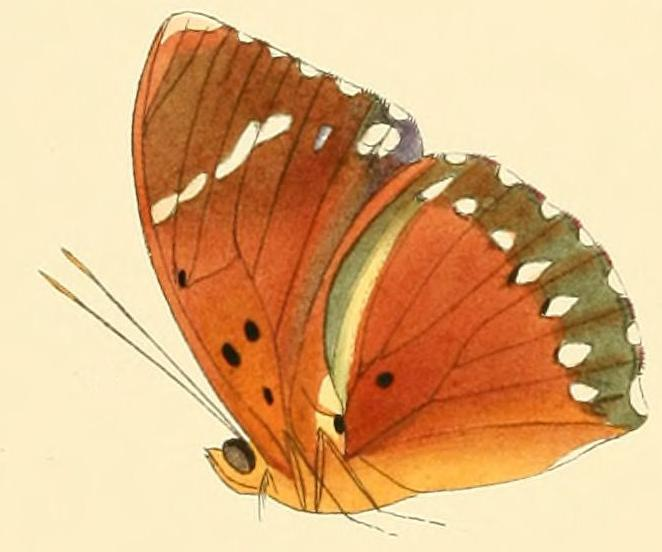

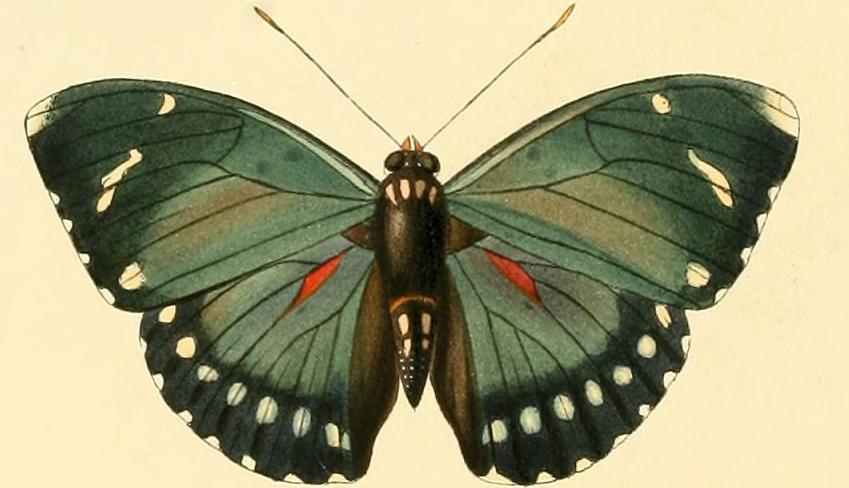

Scientific classification
- Kingdom: Animalia
- Phylum: Arthropoda
- Clade: Pancrustacea
- Class: Insecta
- Order: Lepidoptera
- Family: Nymphalidae
- Genus: Euphaedra
- Species: E. zampa

Binomial name
- Euphaedra zampa (Westwood, 1850)

Synonyms
- Romalaeosoma zampa Westwood, 1850; Euphaedra (Euphaedrana) zampa

= Euphaedra zampa =

Species of butterfly

Euphaedra zampa, the green orange forester, is a butterfly in the family Nymphalidae. It is found in Sierra Leone, Liberia, Ivory Coast and Ghana. The habitat consists of primary wet forests.

== Description ==
zampa Westw. (42 c)[under eleus] Forewing above unicolorous light bluish grey-green, with very narrow, sometimes interrupted, white subapical band and white apical spot; hindwing above similarly coloured, only occasionally tinged with red-yellow in the cell, and with very broad, white-spotted marginal band. Beneath both wings are red-yellow, at the distal margin more or less greenish grey; cell of the forewing with 3, of the hindwing with one black dot. Sierra Leone. — ab. ferruginea Stgr.[ now species Euphaedra ferruginea] only differs in having the hindwing above brown-red to beyond the middle and only close to the marginal band narrowly greenish. Old Calabar, Cameroons. Images GBIF

== Biology ==
Adults are attracted to fruit.

== Taxonomy ==
Elevated to species by Michel Guillaumin

Torben Larsen developed a species numbering system for his 2005 publication Butterflies of West Africa. This species is #1112. The 'Larsen' numbers have since been used with permission in A Sharp Eye on Butterflies of Ghana.

== Similar species ==
Other members of the Euphaedra eleus species group q.v.
