= Euphaedra rattrayi =

Scientific classification
- Kingdom: Animalia
- Phylum: Arthropoda
- Class: Insecta
- Order: Lepidoptera
- Family: Nymphalidae
- Genus: Euphaedra
- Species: E. rattrayi

Binomial name
- Euphaedra rattrayi Sharpe, 1904

Synonyms
- Euphaedra (Euphaedrana) rattrayi; Euphaedra eleus f. bwambaensis Stoneham, 1956; Euphaedra eleus f. nigroextensa Stoneham, 1932; Euphaedra eleus f. coeruleomaculata Stoneham, 1932; Euphaedra eleus f. orientis Stoneham, 1932; Euphaedra eleus f. rufobrunneus Stoneham, 1932; Euphaedra eleus f. subreducta Stoneham, 1956; Euphaedra eleus f. coerulefacies Stoneham, 1956

Species of butterfly

Euphaedra rattrayi is a butterfly in the family Nymphalidae. It is found in the Democratic Republic of the Congo, Uganda, Kenya and Tanzania.

== Subspecies ==
- Euphaedra rattrayi rattrayi (Democratic Republic of the Congo: Kivu, Uganda: west to the Ruwenzori massif)
- Euphaedra rattrayi coeruleomaculata Hecq, 1991 (Kenya: west to the Kakamega district)

== Original description ==
Euphaedra rattrayi Sp. n.

Allied to E. zampa, Westw., but distinguished by the chestnut patch near the base of the fore wing.

Male. Fore wing: Ground colour rather darker green than in E. zampa, With an oblique band near the apical area creamy white, broader than in the above-named species; near the base a deep chestnut-red patch, with a suffusion of the same colour extending between the nervules towards the hind margin. Hind wing with the central area reddish brown, deeper in colour on the subcostal nervules; hind margin bluish green, relieved by internervular white spots suffused with blue. Under side: General colour of both wings yellowish buff, tinged with green; the white bands and spots similar to those of zampa, with the three whitish spots rather more strongly indicated than in the latter species. Expanse, 2:7 in.

Female. Scarcely different from that of E. zampa, the oblique apical band being somewhat broader, the white spot near the posterior angle indicated by a faint bluish line. Under side somewhat more dingy in colour, the apical area having a greenish tint; all the other white spots and markings strongly pronounced, especially those at the end of the cell of the hind wing. The dark outlines of the white spots on the hind margin less strongly indicated. Expanse, 3:4 in. Hab. Toro; November—December, 1900 (H. B. Rattray).

== Similar species ==
Other members of the Euphaedra eleus species group q.v.
