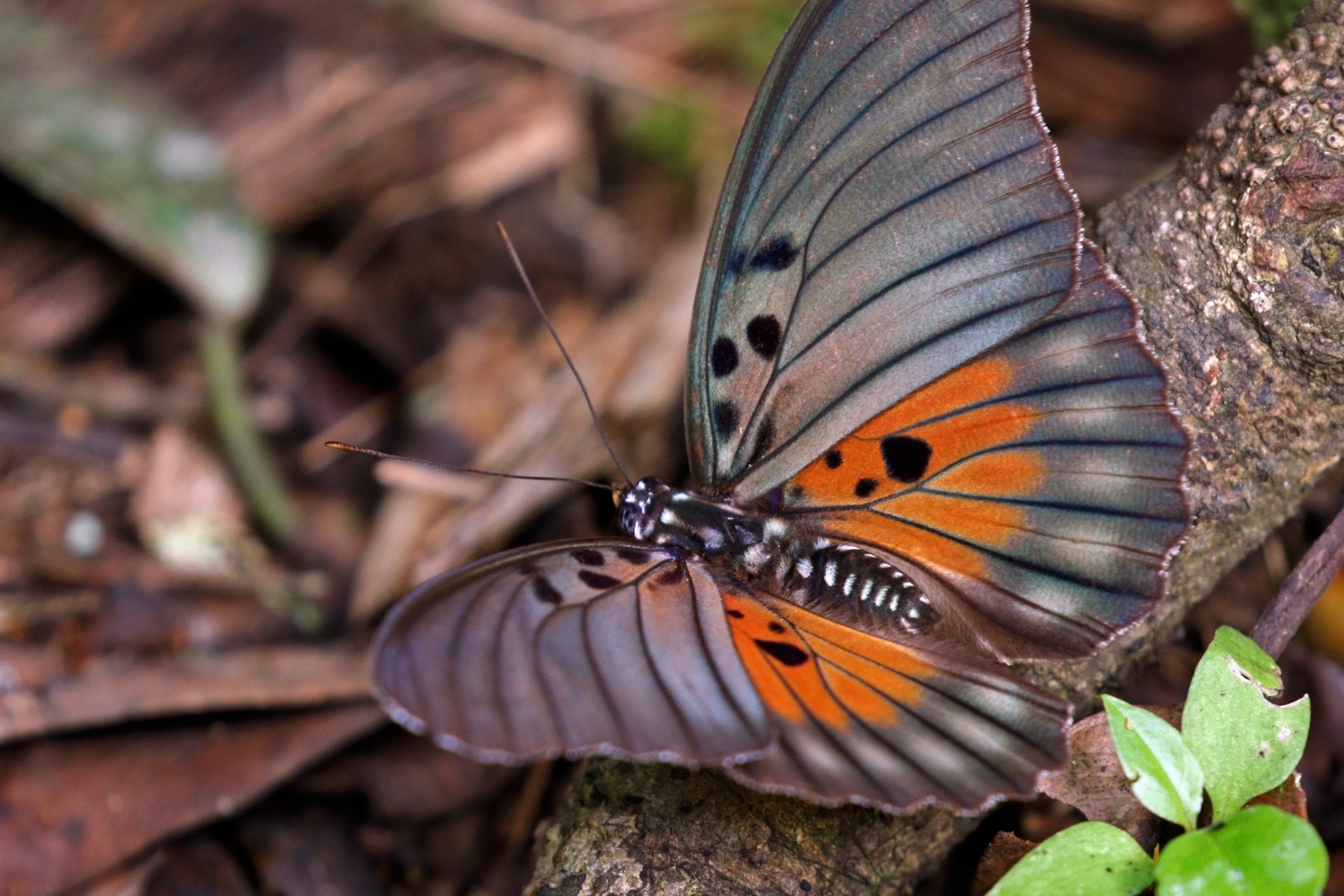
- Kibale National Park, Uganda

Scientific classification
- Kingdom: Animalia
- Phylum: Arthropoda
- Clade: Pancrustacea
- Class: Insecta
- Order: Lepidoptera
- Family: Nymphalidae
- Genus: Euphaedra
- Species: E. edwardsii

Binomial name
- Euphaedra edwardsii (van der Hoeven, 1845)

Synonyms
- Nymphalis (Aterica) edwardsii van der Hoeven, 1845; Euphaedra (Euphaedrana) edwardsii; Romaleosoma pratinas Doubleday, 1848; Euphaedra edwardsi viridis Suffert, 1904; Euphaedra edwardsi ab. clarus Aurivillius, 1912; Euphaedra edwardsi clarus d’Abrera, 1980

= Euphaedra edwardsii =

Species of butterfly

Euphaedra edwardsii, or Edwards' forester, is a butterfly in the family Nymphalidae. It is found in Guinea, Sierra Leone, Liberia, Ivory Coast, Ghana, Togo, Benin, Nigeria, Cameroon, Gabon, the Republic of the Congo, the Central African Republic, the Democratic Republic of the Congo and Uganda.

== Description ==
E. edwardsi Hoeven (42 female, not male). Hindwing on both surfaces with a black discocellular spot. The cells above and beneath with three large black spots. Forewing in the usually uniform greenish grey-brown above, with black veins, in the female red-yellow in the basal part; hindwing yellow-brown above with blackish marginal band and light yellow submarginal spots. The under surface lighter, with or without whitish submarginal spots. Ashanti to Dahomey-In ab. viridis Suff. the basal part of the hindwing is dusky green above instead of red-brownish and the cell-spots are indistinct. Togo. ab. clarus Auriv. is on an average lighter and occurs in the Congo region.

Torben Larsen developed a species numbering system for his 2005 publication Butterflies of West Africa. This species is #1115. The 'Larsen' numbers have since been used with permission in A Sharp Eye on Butterflies of Ghana.

== Similar species ==
Other members of the Euphaedra eleus species group q.v.

== Biology ==
It is found in a wide variety of habitats, from wet forests to almost open country.

The larvae feed on Lecaniodiscus cupanioides.
