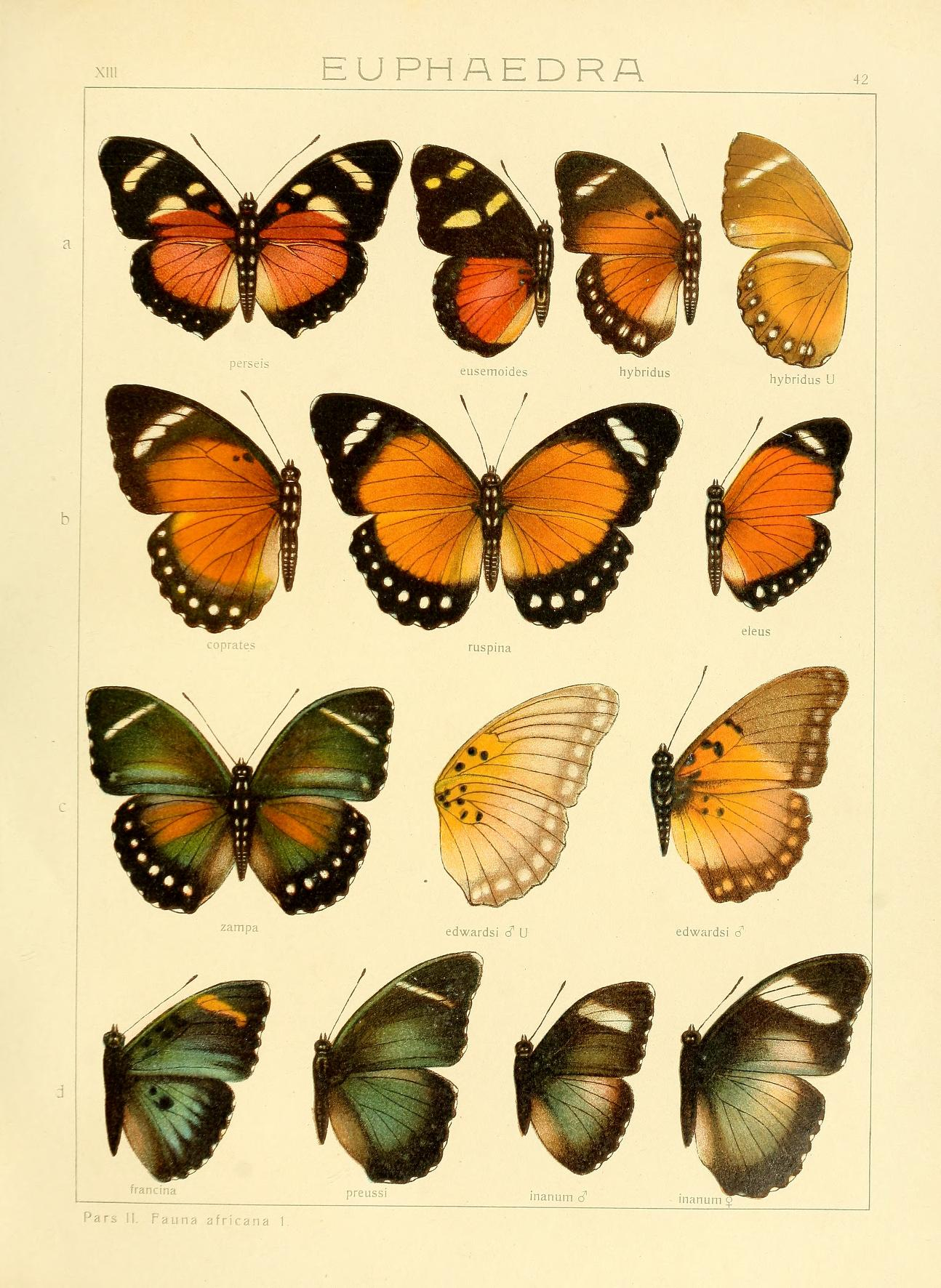
- In Adalbert Seitz's Fauna Africana

Scientific classification
- Domain: Eukaryota
- Kingdom: Animalia
- Phylum: Arthropoda
- Class: Insecta
- Order: Lepidoptera
- Family: Nymphalidae
- Genus: Euphaedra
- Species: E. coprates

Binomial name
- Euphaedra coprates (H. Druce, 1875)

Synonyms
- Romaleosoma coprates H. Druce, 1875; Euphaedra (Euphaedrana) coprates; Euphaedra eleus ab. moderata Neustetter, 1916; Euphaedra eleus eleus f. congoensis Schmidt, 1921; Euphaedra eleus f. angustimarginata Schmidt, 1921

= Euphaedra coprates =

Species of butterfly

Euphaedra coprates is a butterfly in the family Nymphalidae first described by Herbert Druce in 1875. It is found in the Angola and the Democratic Republic of the Congo (Kongo Central province).

The larvae feed on Phialodiscus and Allophylus species.

== Similar species ==
Other members of the Euphaedra eleus species group q.v.
