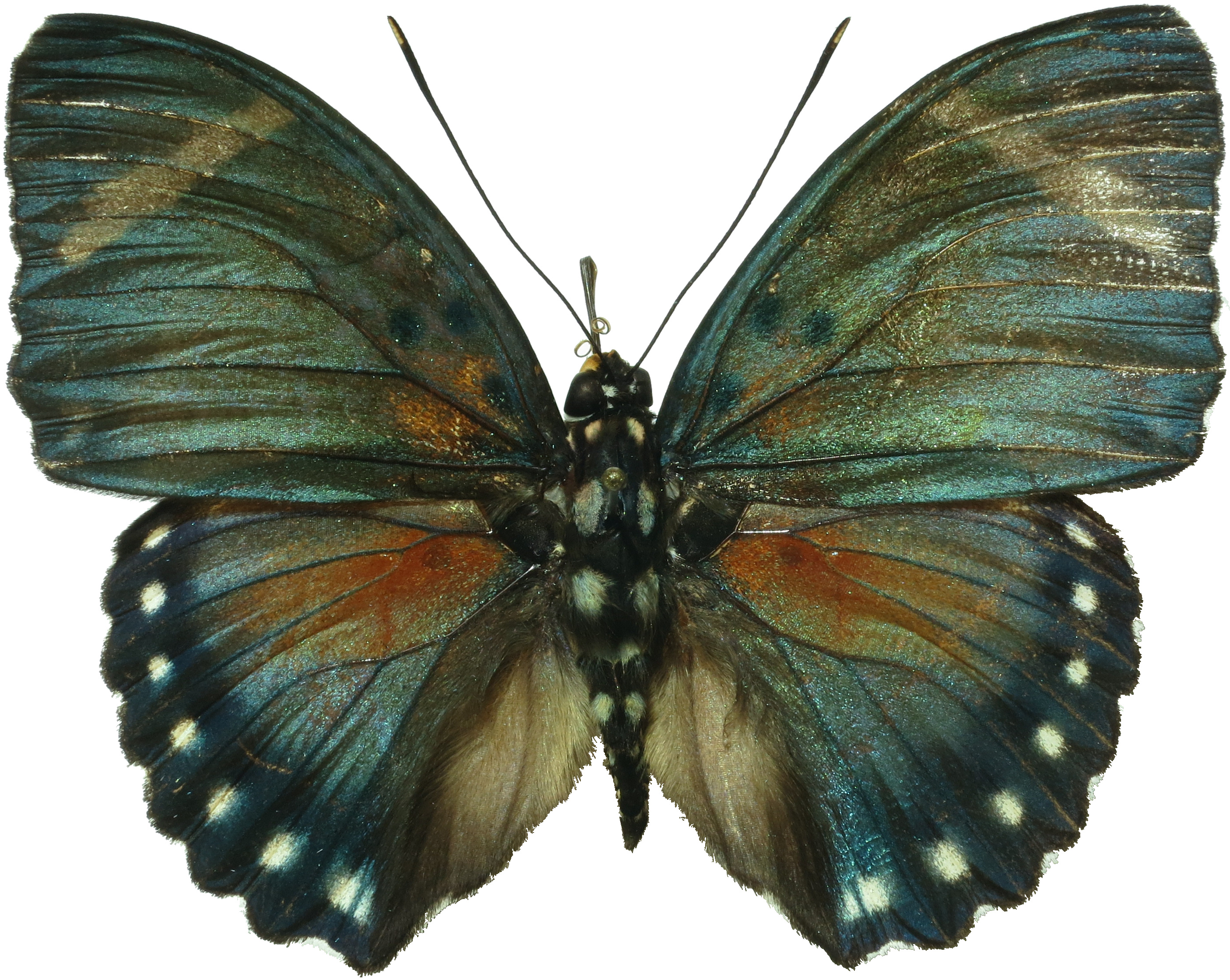
- Mbalmayo, Cameroon

Scientific classification
- Kingdom: Animalia
- Phylum: Arthropoda
- Class: Insecta
- Order: Lepidoptera
- Family: Nymphalidae
- Genus: Euphaedra
- Species: E. ferruginea

Binomial name
- Euphaedra ferruginea Staudinger, 1886

Synonyms
- Euphaedra zampa var. ferruginea Staudinger, 1886; Euphaedra (Euphaedrana) ferruginea; Euphaedra eleus var. occidentalis Gaede, 1916; Euphaedra erasmus Birket-Smith, 1960

= Euphaedra ferruginea =

Species of butterfly

Euphaedra ferruginea, the ferruginous orange forester, is a butterfly in the family Nymphalidae. It is found in eastern Nigeria and Cameroon. The habitat consists of forests.

== Similar species ==
Other members of the Euphaedra eleus species group q.v. It was described as a form of eleus zampa — ab. ferruginea Stgr. only differs in having the hindwing above brown-red to beyond the middle and only close to the marginal band narrowly greenish. Old Calabar, Cameroons.

== Gallery ==
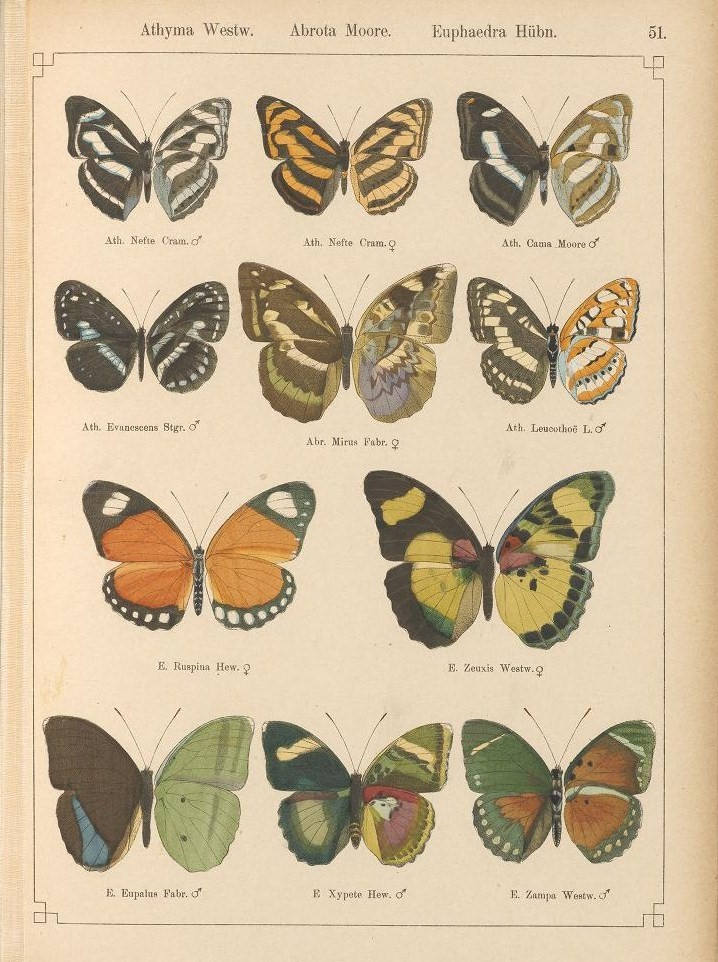
Euphaedra zampa var. ferruginea depicted in Exotische schmetterlinge von dr. O. Staudinger und dr. E. Schatz.
