= Leona (skipper) =

Scientific classification
- Kingdom: Animalia
- Phylum: Arthropoda
- Class: Insecta
- Order: Lepidoptera
- Family: Hesperiidae
- Tribe: Erionotini
- Genus: Leona; Evans, 1937

Genus of butterflies

Leona is a genus of skippers in the family Hesperiidae.

== Taxonomy ==
The genus was treated as a synonym of Caenides by Lindsey & Miller in 1965 and by Ackery et al. in 1995. It was later treated as a valid genus by Larsen in 2005.

=== Species ===
- Leona allyni (Miller, 1971)
- Leona halma Evans, 1937
- Leona leonora (Plötz, 1879)
- Leona meloui (Riley, 1926)
- Leona na (Lindsey & Miller, 1965)
- Leona stoehri (Karsch, 1893)

=== Former species ===
- Leona binoevatus (Mabille, 1891) - transferred to Lennia binoevatus (Mabille, 1891)
- Leona lena Evans, 1937 - transferred to Lennia lena (Evans, 1937)
- Leona lissa Evans, 1937 - transferred to Lissia lissa (Evans, 1937)
- Leona lota Evans, 1937 - transferred to Lennia lota (Evans, 1937)
- Leona luehderi (Plötz, 1879) - transferred to Lissia luehderi (Plötz, 1879)
- Leona maracanda (Hewitson, 1876) - transferred to Lennia maracanda (Hewitson, 1876)
