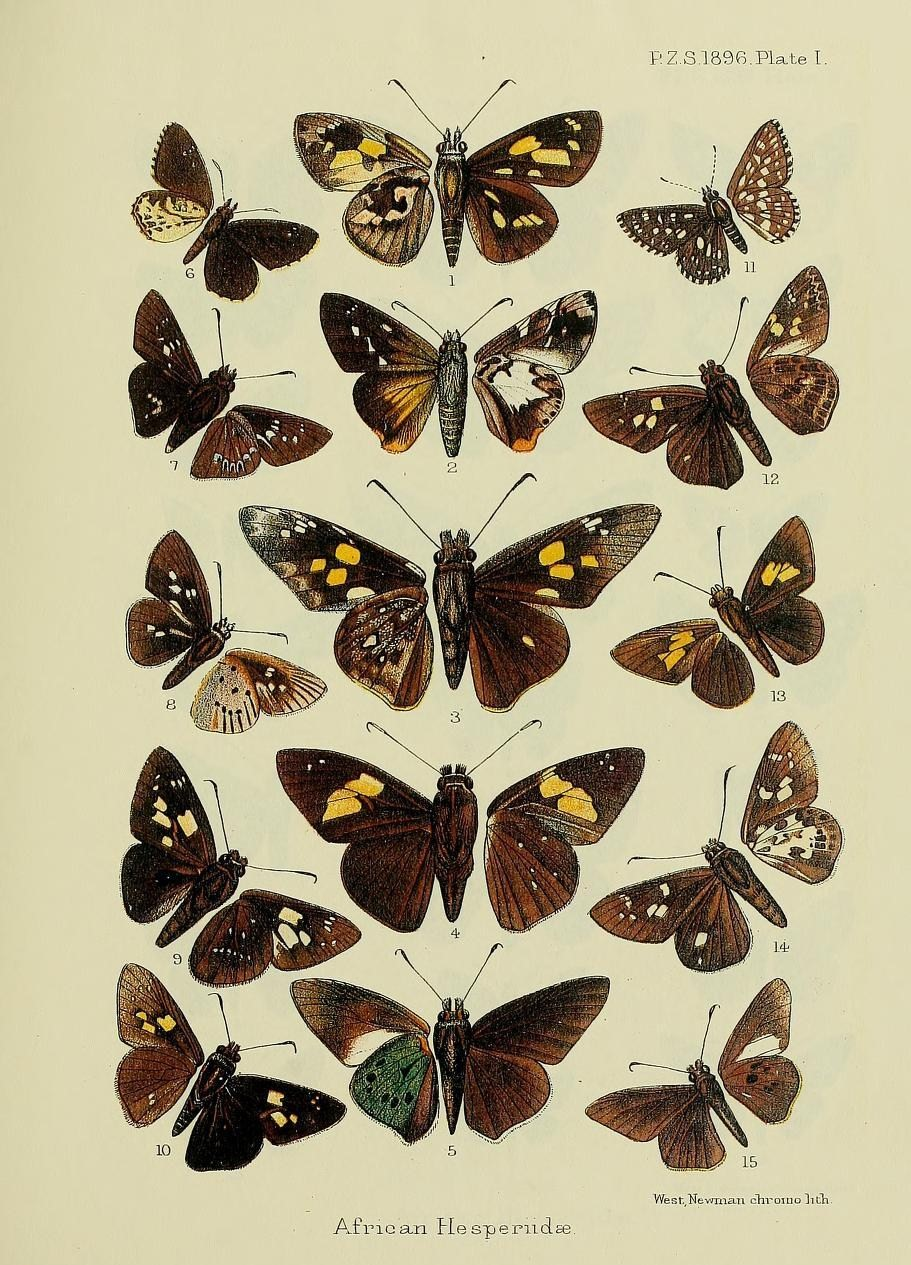

Scientific classification
- Kingdom: Animalia
- Phylum: Arthropoda
- Class: Insecta
- Order: Lepidoptera
- Family: Hesperiidae
- Tribe: Astictopterini
- Genus: Caenides; Holland, 1896

= Caenides =

Genus of butterflies

Caenides is a genus of skippers in the family Hesperiidae.

== Species ==
- Caenides benga (Holland, 1891) – yellow-patch recluse
- Caenides dacenilla Aurivillius, 1925 – no-spot recluse
- Caenides hidaroides Aurivillius, 1896 – Aurivillius' recluse
- Caenides kangvensis Holland, 1896 – yellow-spotted recluse
- Caenides otilia Belcastro, 1990 – Otilia's recluse
- Caenides sophia (Evans, 1937)
- Caenides soritia (Hewitson, 1876) – well-spotted recluse
- Caenides xychus (Mabille, 1891) – unbranded recluse

=== Former species ===
- Caenides dacena (Hewitson, 1876) - transferred to Hypoleucis dacena (Hewitson, 1876) per Zhang et al., 2022: 41.
- Caenides stoehri (Karsch, 1893) - transferred to Leona stoehri (Karsch, 1893)
- Caenides binoevatus (Mabille, 1891) - transferred to Lennia binoevatus (Mabille, 1891)
- Caenides leonora (Plötz, 1879) - transferred to Leona leonora (Plötz, 1879)
- Caenides maracanda (Hewitson, 1876) - transferred to Leona maracanda (Hewitson, 1876)
