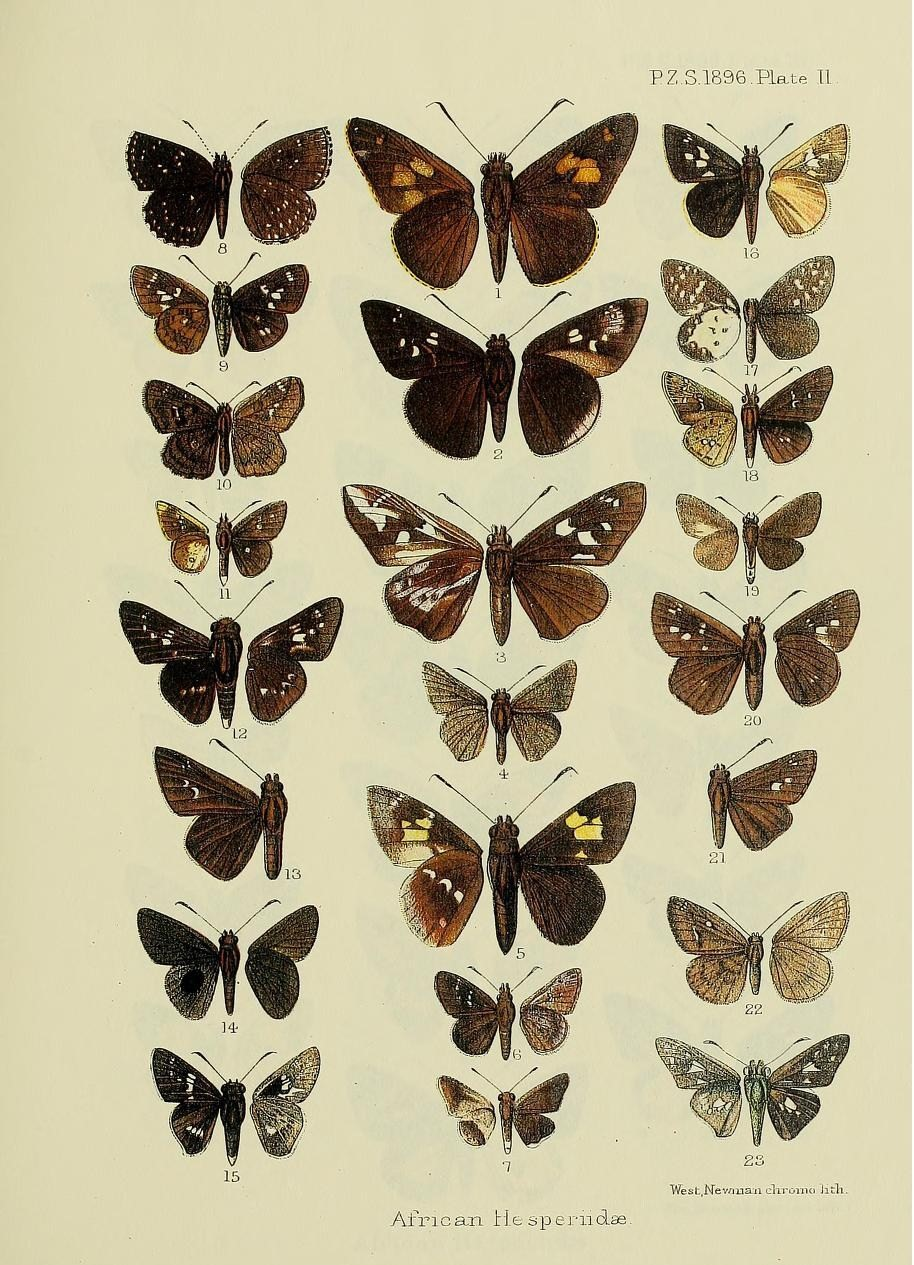
- Caenides dacela figure 2

Scientific classification
- Kingdom: Animalia
- Phylum: Arthropoda
- Class: Insecta
- Order: Lepidoptera
- Family: Hesperiidae
- Genus: Caenides
- Species: C. dacela

Binomial name
- Caenides dacela (Hewitson, 1876)

Synonyms
- Hesperia dacela Hewitson, 1876; Hesperia nydia Plötz, 1879

= Caenides dacela =

Common recluse

Species of butterfly

Caenides dacela, commonly known as the common recluse, is a species of butterfly in the family Hesperiidae. It is found within the geographical range that stretches from the Basse Casamance in Senegal to Uganda and Kenya, but generally does not penetrate much south of the Equator (mainly to Gabon and upper Kasai).

The larvae feed on Raphia and Phoenix species (including Phoenix dactylifera).
