= Caenides sophia =

Scientific classification
- Kingdom: Animalia
- Phylum: Arthropoda
- Class: Insecta
- Order: Lepidoptera
- Family: Hesperiidae
- Genus: Caenides
- Species: C. sophia

Binomial name
- Caenides sophia (Evans, 1937)

Synonyms
- Hypoleucis sophia (Evans, 1937)

Species of butterfly

Caenides sophia, the scarce costus skipper, is a species of butterfly in the family Hesperiidae. It is found in Ivory Coast, Ghana, Nigeria, Cameroon, the Central African Republic, the Democratic Republic of the Congo and Uganda. The habitat consists of wetter forests.

Adults are attracted to flowers.

The larvae feed on Sorghum arundinaceum.
