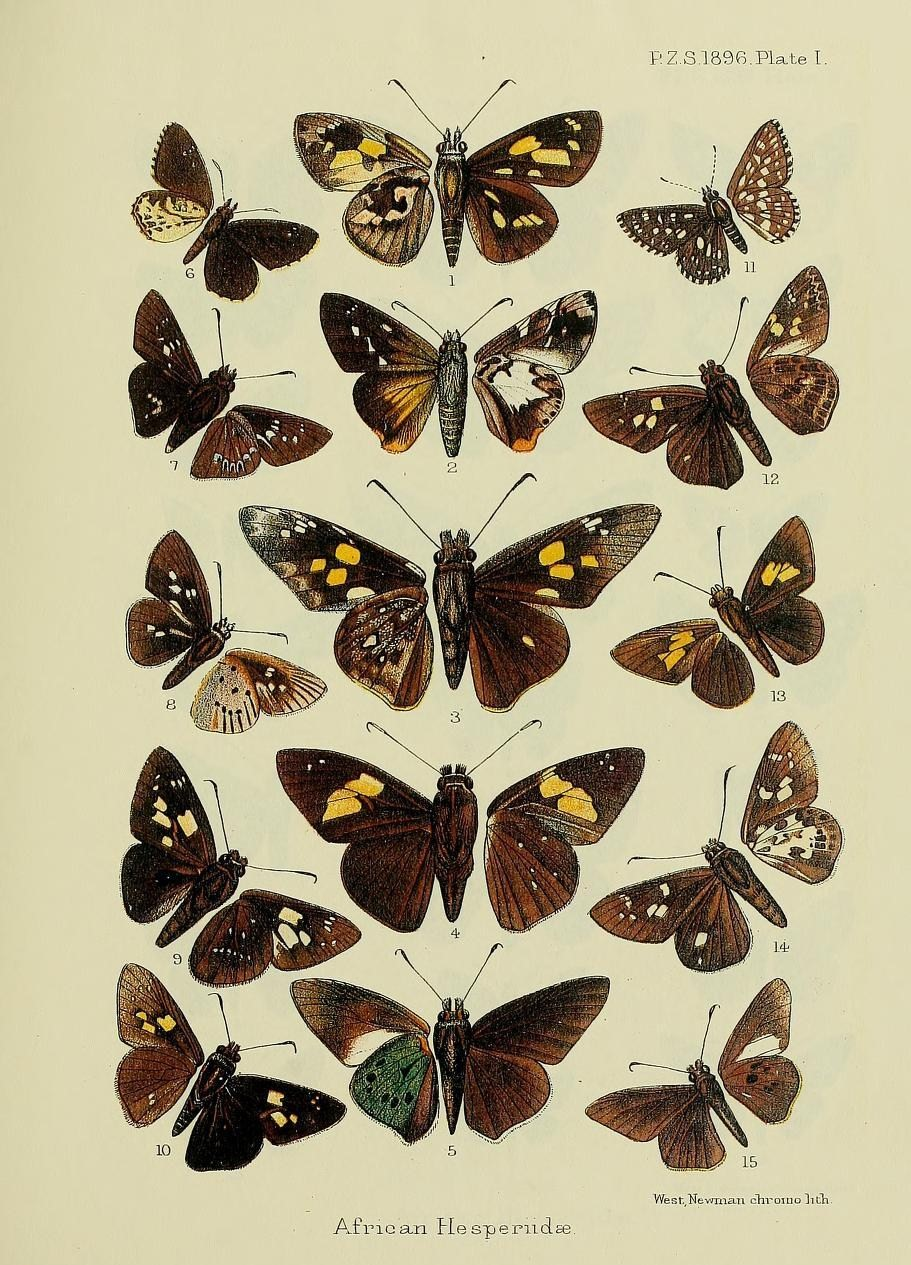
- Figure 10

Scientific classification
- Kingdom: Animalia
- Phylum: Arthropoda
- Class: Insecta
- Order: Lepidoptera
- Family: Hesperiidae
- Genus: Caenides
- Species: C. kangvensis

Binomial name
- Caenides kangvensis Holland, 1896

= Caenides kangvensis =

Species of butterfly

Caenides kangvensis, the yellow-spotted recluse, is a species of butterfly in the family Hesperiidae. It is found in Ivory Coast, Ghana, Nigeria, Cameroon, Gabon, the Republic of the Congo, the Democratic Republic of the Congo, Uganda and north-western Tanzania. The habitat consists of forests and mature secondary growth.

The larvae feed on Thalia welwitschii and Gloriosa superba.
