= Caenides otilia =

Otilia's recluse

Scientific classification
- Kingdom: Animalia
- Phylum: Arthropoda
- Class: Insecta
- Order: Lepidoptera
- Family: Hesperiidae
- Genus: Caenides
- Species: C. otilia

Binomial name
- Caenides otilia Belcastro, 1990

Synonyms
- Caenides banta Evans (manuscript name); Caenides evansi Berger (manuscript name)

Species of butterfly

Caenides otilia, the Otilia's recluse, is a species of butterfly in the family Hesperiidae. It is found in Sierra Leone, Ivory Coast, Ghana, Nigeria and southern Cameroon. The habitat consists of dense, dark forest.
