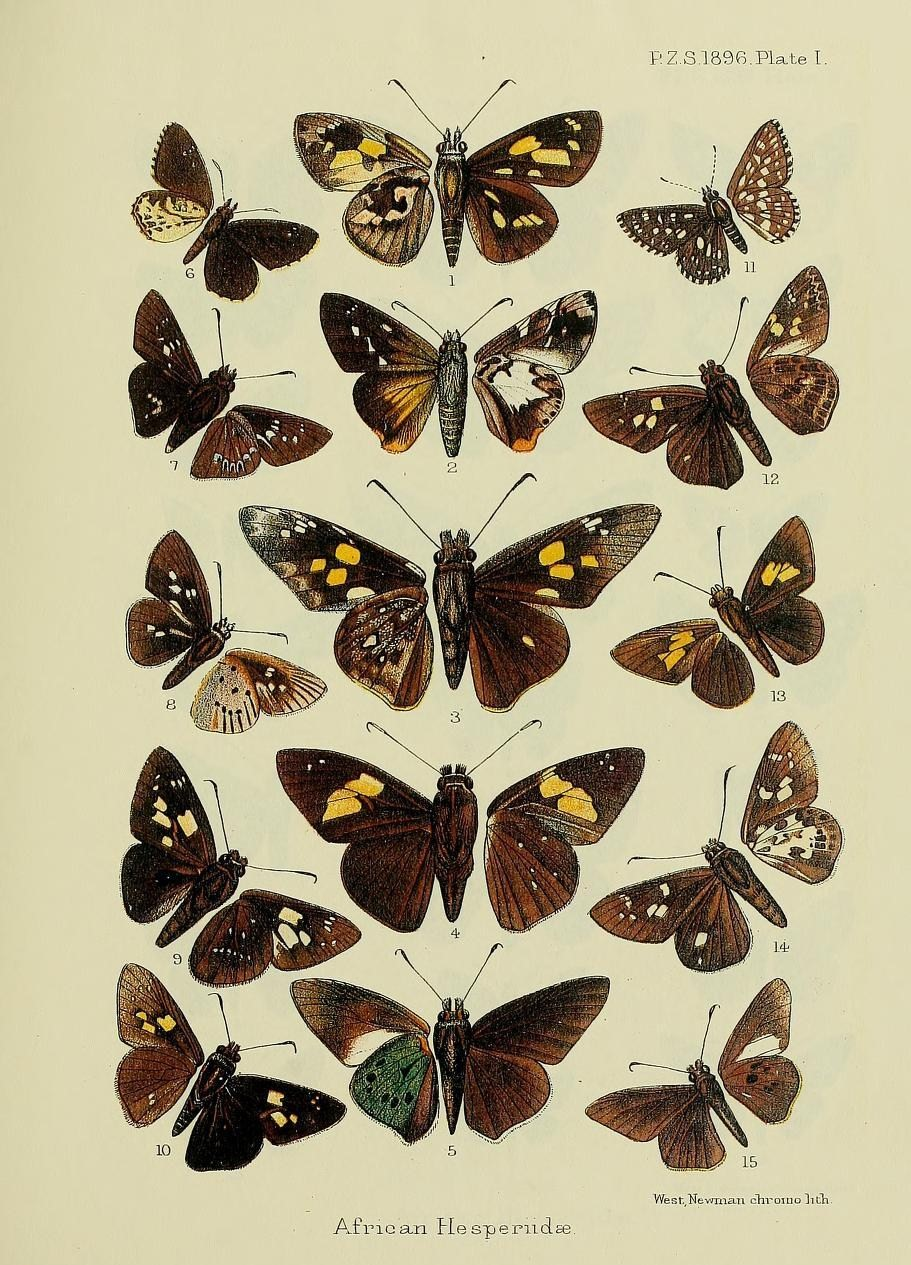
- Figure 9

Scientific classification
- Kingdom: Animalia
- Phylum: Arthropoda
- Class: Insecta
- Order: Lepidoptera
- Family: Hesperiidae
- Genus: Caenides
- Species: C. soritia

Binomial name
- Caenides soritia (Hewitson, 1876)

Synonyms
- Hesperia soritia Hewitson, 1876; Proteides xantho Mabille, 1891

= Caenides soritia =

Well-spotted recluse

Species of butterfly

Caenides soritia, the well-spotted recluse, is a species of butterfly in the family Hesperiidae. It is found in Guinea, Sierra Leone, Liberia, Ivory Coast, Ghana, Nigeria, Cameroon, Bioko, Gabon and possibly Malawi. The habitat consists of forests.

The larvae feed on Elaeis guineensis and Zingiber species.
