= Leona halma =

Scientific classification
- Domain: Eukaryota
- Kingdom: Animalia
- Phylum: Arthropoda
- Class: Insecta
- Order: Lepidoptera
- Family: Hesperiidae
- Genus: Leona
- Species: L. halma

Binomial name
- Leona halma Evans, 1937

Synonyms
- Caenides halma

Species of butterfly

Leona halma, or Evans' recluse, is a butterfly in the family Hesperiidae. It is found in Senegal, Guinea, Nigeria, Cameroon, the Central African Republic, the eastern part of the Democratic Republic of the Congo, Uganda, western Kenya, Tanzania and Zambia. The habitat consists of forests.

In Senegal, adults feed almost exclusively on the flowers of Costus species. Here, the adult flight period and flowering period of the plant are synchronized.

The larvae feed on Aframomum species.
