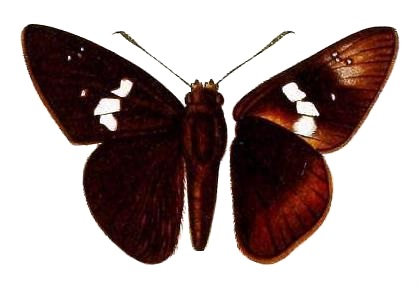
- Male

Scientific classification
- Kingdom: Animalia
- Phylum: Arthropoda
- Class: Insecta
- Order: Lepidoptera
- Family: Hesperiidae
- Genus: Caenides
- Species: C. hidaroides

Binomial name
- Caenides hidaroides Aurivillius, 1896

Synonyms
- Caenides artopta Druce, 1910

= Caenides hidaroides =

Aurivillius' recluse

Species of butterfly

Caenides hidaroides, commonly known as Aurivillius' recluse, is a species of butterfly in the family Hesperiidae. It is found in Guinea, Sierra Leone, Liberia, Ivory Coast, Ghana, Nigeria, Cameroon, the Republic of the Congo, the Central African Republic, the Democratic Republic of the Congo and western Tanzania. The habitat consists of forests.
