= Leona meloui =

Scientific classification
- Domain: Eukaryota
- Kingdom: Animalia
- Phylum: Arthropoda
- Class: Insecta
- Order: Lepidoptera
- Family: Hesperiidae
- Genus: Leona
- Species: L. meloui

Binomial name
- Leona meloui (Riley, 1926)

Synonyms
- Coenides meloui Riley, 1926; Caenides meloui

Species of butterfly

Leona meloui, the Melou's recluse, is a butterfly in the family Hesperiidae. It is found in Sierra Leone, Liberia, Ivory Coast, Ghana, Togo, Nigeria, Cameroon, the Republic of the Congo and the Democratic Republic of the Congo. The habitat consists of forests.
