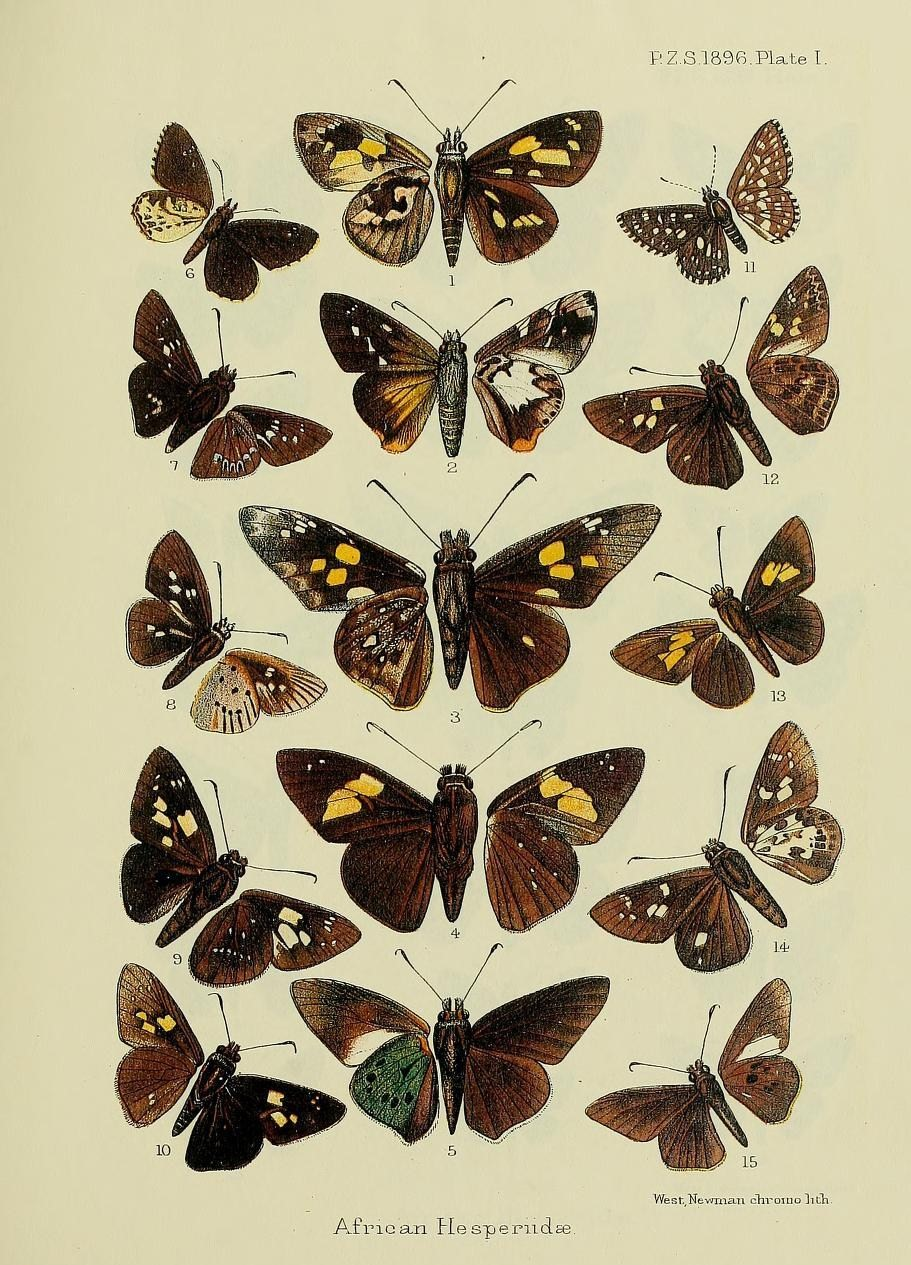
- Figure 13

Scientific classification
- Kingdom: Animalia
- Phylum: Arthropoda
- Class: Insecta
- Order: Lepidoptera
- Family: Hesperiidae
- Genus: Caenides
- Species: C. benga

Binomial name
- Caenides benga (Holland, 1891)

Synonyms
- Proteides benga Holland, 1891

= Caenides benga =

Species of butterfly

Caenides benga, the yellow-patch recluse, is a species of butterfly in the family Hesperiidae. It is found in Sierra Leone, Liberia, Ivory Coast, Ghana, Nigeria, Cameroon, Gabon, the Republic of the Congo and the Democratic Republic of the Congo. The habitat consists of tall secondary forests with a closed canopy.
