= Caenides dacenilla =

Scientific classification
- Kingdom: Animalia
- Phylum: Arthropoda
- Class: Insecta
- Order: Lepidoptera
- Family: Hesperiidae
- Genus: Caenides
- Species: C. dacenilla

Binomial name
- Caenides dacenilla Aurivillius, 1925

Species of butterfly

Caenides dacenilla, the no-spot recluse, is a species of butterfly in the family Hesperiidae. It is found in Ivory Coast, Ghana, Nigeria (the Cross River loop) and Cameroon. The habitat consists of dense forest.
