= Leona allyni =

Scientific classification
- Kingdom: Animalia
- Phylum: Arthropoda
- Class: Insecta
- Order: Lepidoptera
- Family: Hesperiidae
- Genus: Leona
- Species: L. allyni

Binomial name
- Leona allyni (Miller, 1971)

Synonyms
- Caenides allyni Miller, 1971

Species of butterfly

Leona allyni is a butterfly in the family Hesperiidae. It is found in the Democratic Republic of the Congo.
