= Caenides xychus =

Unbranded recluse

Scientific classification
- Kingdom: Animalia
- Phylum: Arthropoda
- Clade: Pancrustacea
- Class: Insecta
- Order: Lepidoptera
- Family: Hesperiidae
- Genus: Caenides
- Species: C. xychus

Binomial name
- Caenides xychus (Mabille, 1891)

Synonyms
- Proteides xychus Mabille, 1891; Caenides kanguensis ab. feminina Strand, 1913

Species of butterfly

Caenides xychus, the unbranded recluse, is a species of butterfly in the family Hesperiidae. It is found in Sierra Leone, Ivory Coast, Ghana, Cameroon, the Republic of the Congo, the Central African Republic, the Democratic Republic of the Congo and Uganda. The habitat consists of dense forests.
