= Lennia lena =

Scientific classification
- Kingdom: Animalia
- Phylum: Arthropoda
- Class: Insecta
- Order: Lepidoptera
- Family: Hesperiidae
- Genus: Lennia
- Species: L. lena

Binomial name
- Lennia lena (Evans, 1937)

Synonyms
- Caenides lena; Leona lena Evans, 1937

Species of butterfly

Lennia lena, the lesser recluse, is a species of butterfly in the family Hesperiidae. It is found in Ivory Coast, eastern Nigeria, Cameroon and Gabon. The habitat consists of dense forests.
