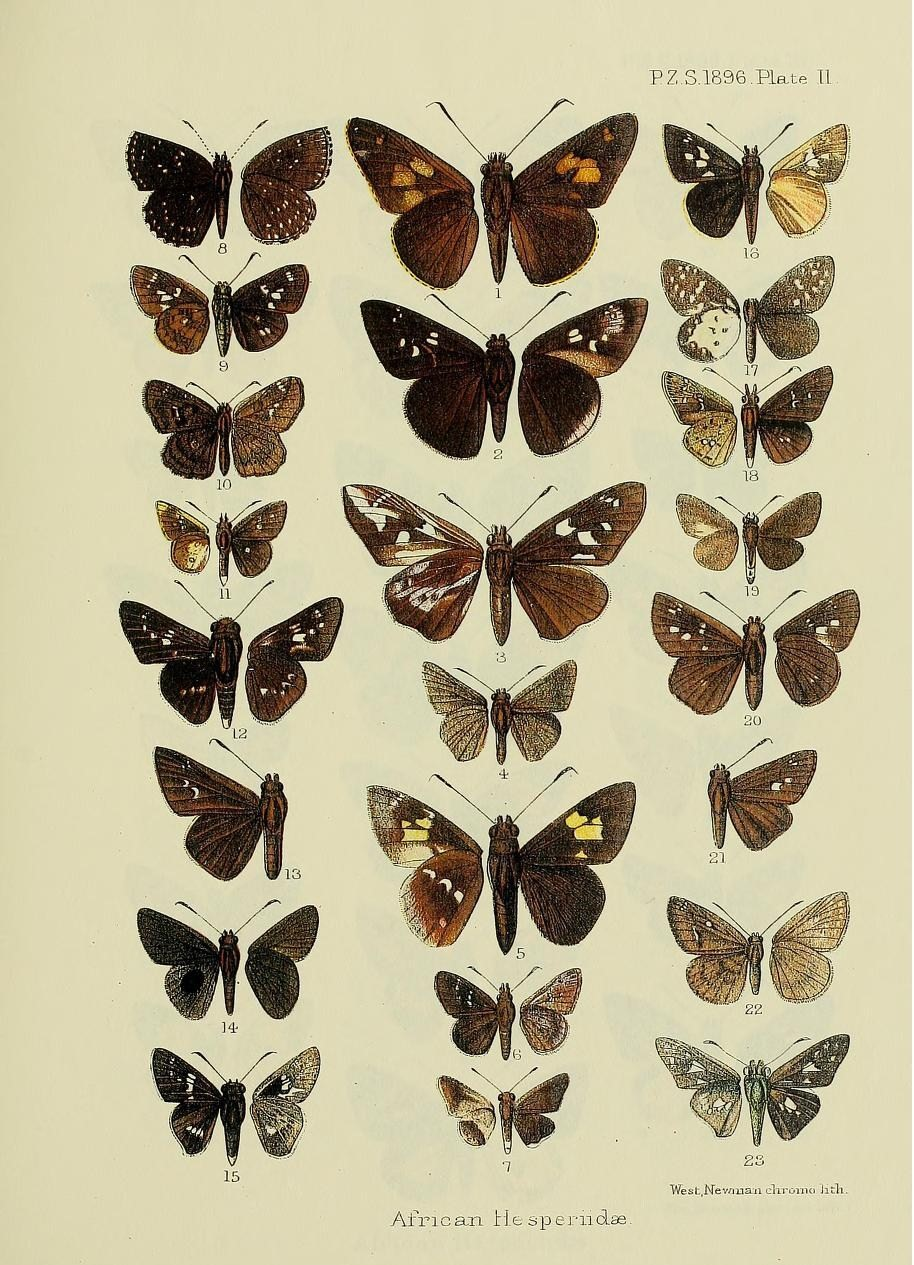
- Figure 5

Scientific classification
- Kingdom: Animalia
- Phylum: Arthropoda
- Clade: Pancrustacea
- Class: Insecta
- Order: Lepidoptera
- Family: Hesperiidae
- Genus: Leona
- Species: L. leonora

Binomial name
- Leona leonora (Plötz, 1879)

Synonyms
- Hesperia leonora Plötz, 1879; Proteides xanthagyra Mabille, 1891; Caenides leonora

= Leona leonora =

Species of butterfly

Leona leonora, the white-spotted recluse, is a butterfly in the family Hesperiidae. It is found in Guinea, Sierra Leone, Liberia, Ivory Coast, Ghana, Togo, Nigeria, Cameroon, Gabon, the Republic of the Congo, the Democratic Republic of the Congo, Uganda, Tanzania, Malawi and Zambia. Its habitat consists of forests.

== Subspecies ==
- Leona leonora leonora (Guinea, Sierra Leone, Liberia, Ivory Coast, Ghana, Togo, Cameroon, Nigeria, Gabon, Congo, Democratic Republic of the Congo, Uganda, western Tanzania)
- Leona leonora dux Evans, 1937 (Democratic Republic of the Congo: Shaba, southern Tanzania, Malawi, Zambia)
