= Lennia lota =

Scientific classification
- Kingdom: Animalia
- Phylum: Arthropoda
- Class: Insecta
- Order: Lepidoptera
- Family: Hesperiidae
- Genus: Lennia
- Species: L. lota

Binomial name
- Lennia lota (Evans, 1937)

Synonyms
- Caenides lota; Leona lota Evans, 1937

Species of butterfly

Lennia lota, the scarce small recluse, is a species of butterfly in the family Hesperiidae. It is found in Ghana, Cameroon, the Central African Republic and the central part of the Democratic Republic of the Congo. The habitat consists of forests.
