= Lissia lissa =

Scientific classification
- Kingdom: Animalia
- Phylum: Arthropoda
- Class: Insecta
- Order: Lepidoptera
- Family: Hesperiidae
- Genus: Lissia
- Species: L. lissa

Binomial name
- Lissia lissa (Evans, 1937)

Synonyms
- Caenides lissa; Leona lissa Evans, 1937

Species of butterfly

Lissia lissa, the Lissa recluse, is a species of butterfly in the family Hesperiidae. It is found in Cameroon, the Central African Republic, Uganda, Kenya and possibly Nigeria.

The larvae feed on Dracaena species.

== Subspecies ==
- Lissia lissa lissa - Cameroon, Central African Republic, and possibly Nigeria
- Lissia lissa lima Evans, 1937 - Uganda, western Kenya
