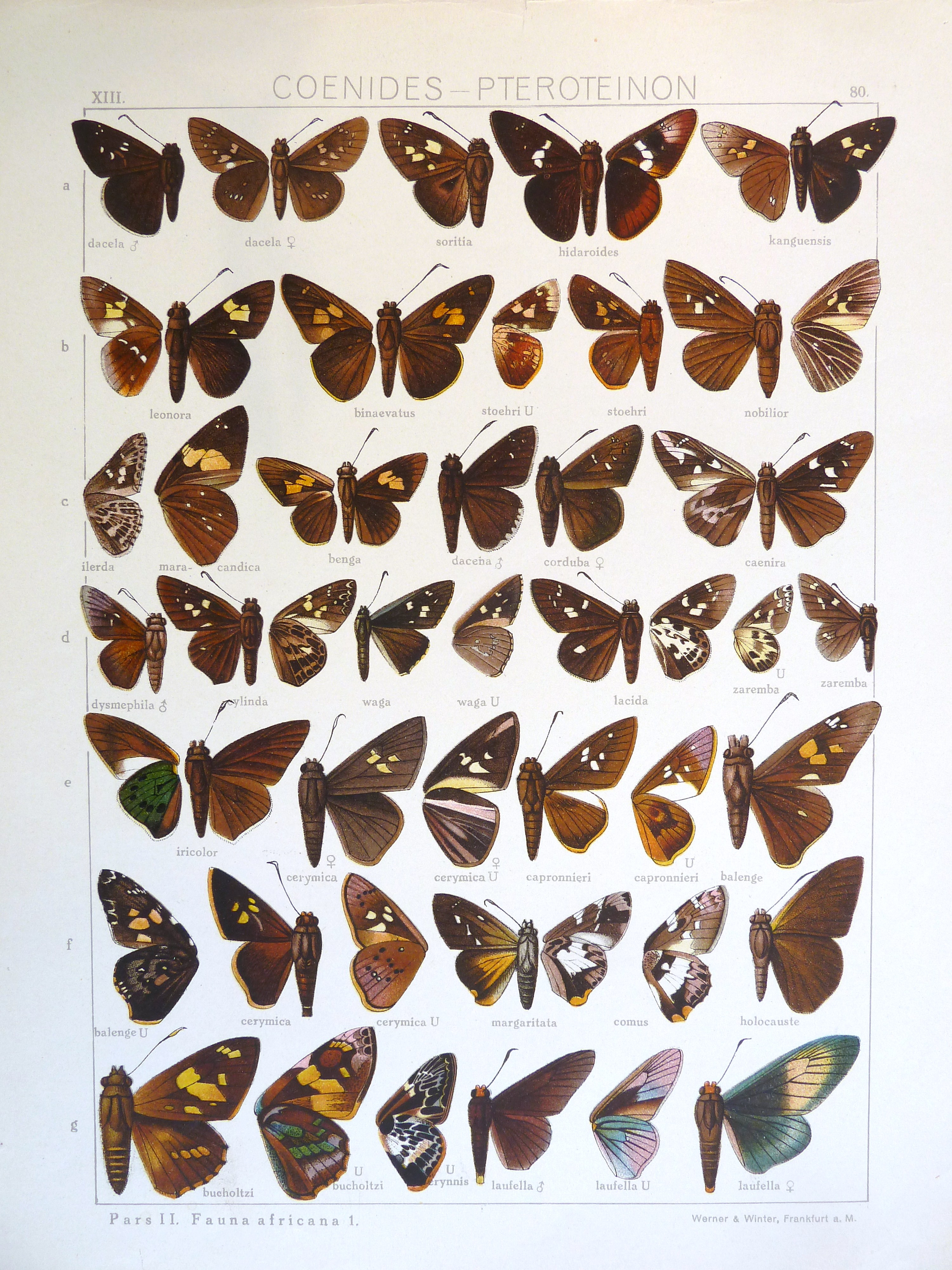
- in Seitz b

Scientific classification
- Domain: Eukaryota
- Kingdom: Animalia
- Phylum: Arthropoda
- Class: Insecta
- Order: Lepidoptera
- Family: Hesperiidae
- Genus: Leona
- Species: L. stoehri

Binomial name
- Leona stoehri (Karsch, 1893)

Synonyms
- Pamphila stoehri Karsch, 1893; Leona volta Evans, 1937; Caenides volta; Caenides stoehri

= Leona stoehri =

Species of butterfly

Leona stoehri, the confused recluse, is a butterfly in the family Hesperiidae. It is found in Ivory Coast, Ghana, Togo, Cameroon, the Central African Republic and the Democratic Republic of the Congo. The habitat consists of forests.
