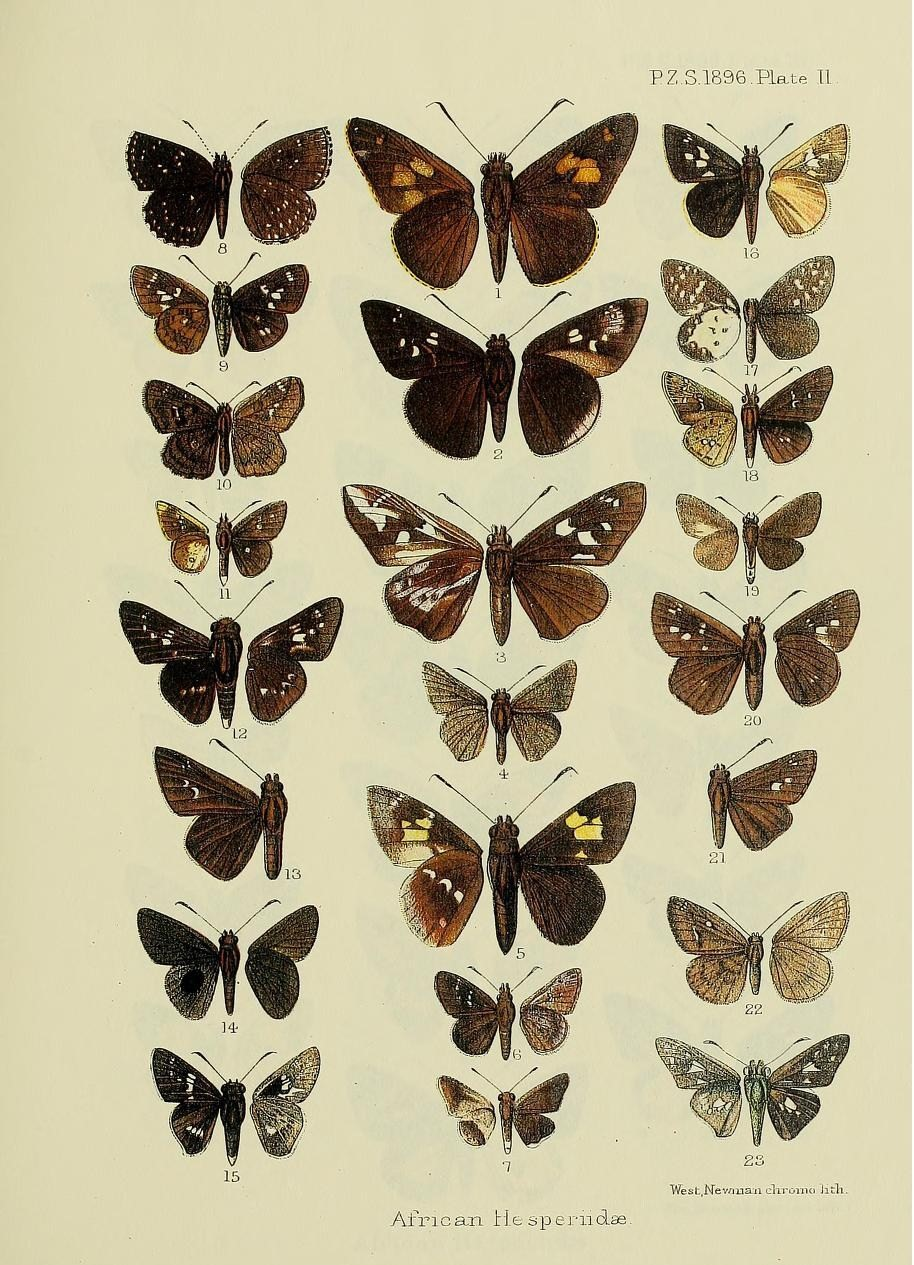
- Figure 1

Scientific classification
- Kingdom: Animalia
- Phylum: Arthropoda
- Class: Insecta
- Order: Lepidoptera
- Family: Hesperiidae
- Genus: Lennia
- Species: L. binoevatus

Binomial name
- Lennia binoevatus (Mabille, 1891)

Synonyms
- Proteides binoevatus Mabille, 1891; Caenides binoevatus; Leona binoevatus (Mabille, 1891)

= Lennia binoevatus =

Species of butterfly

Lennia binoevatus, the large recluse, is a species of butterfly in the family Hesperiidae. It is found in Ghana, Nigeria, Cameroon, Gabon, the Republic of the Congo, the Central African Republic and the Democratic Republic of the Congo. The habitat consists of forests.
