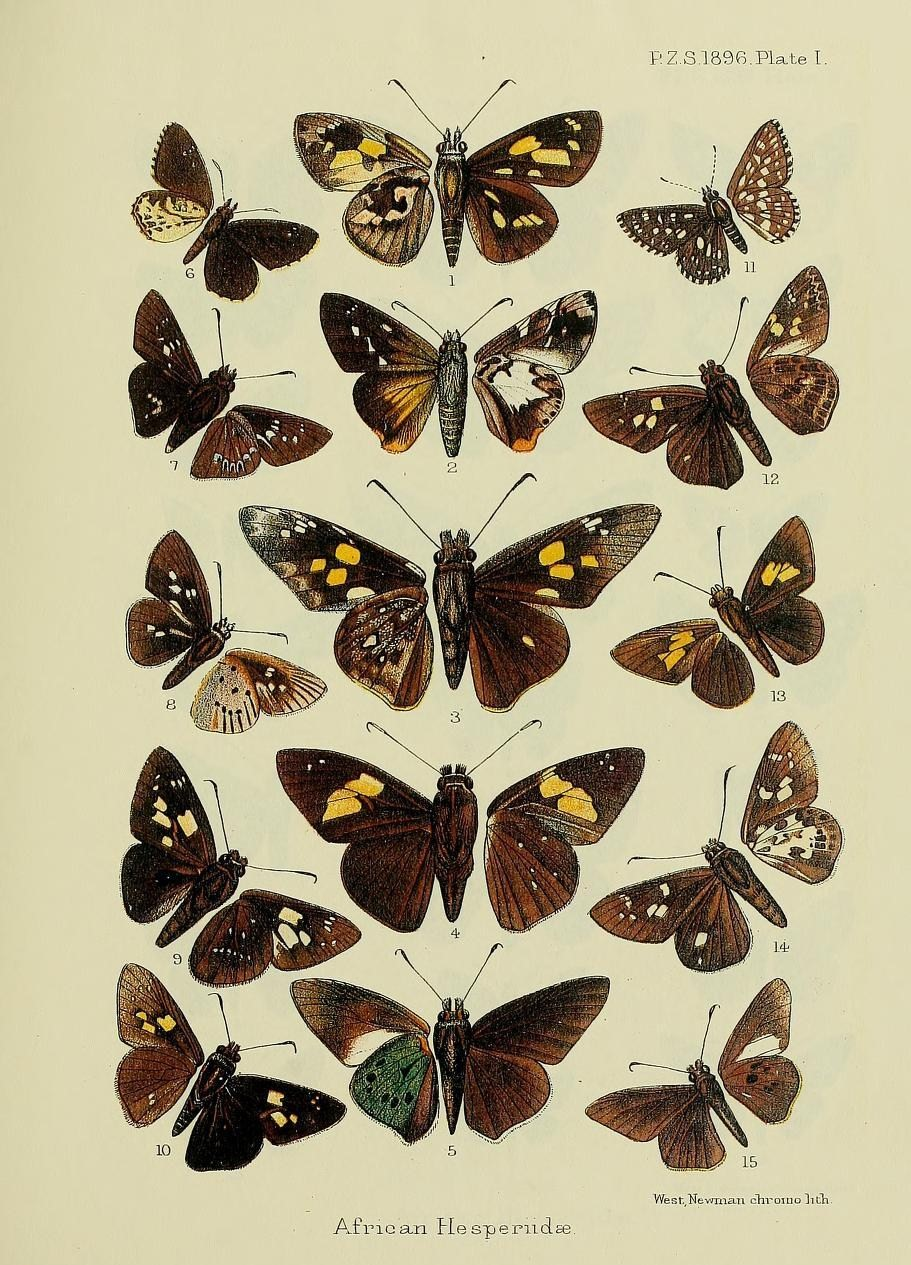
- Figure 4

Scientific classification
- Kingdom: Animalia
- Phylum: Arthropoda
- Class: Insecta
- Order: Lepidoptera
- Family: Hesperiidae
- Genus: Lennia
- Species: L. maracanda

Binomial name
- Lennia maracanda (Hewitson, 1876)

Synonyms
- Hesperia maracanda Hewitson, 1876; Caenides maracanda; Leona maracanda (Hewitson, 1876)

= Lennia maracanda =

Species of butterfly

Lennia maracanda, the scarce large recluse, is a species of butterfly in the family Hesperiidae. It is found in Ivory Coast, Nigeria, Cameroon, Angola, the Democratic Republic of the Congo and north-western Zambia.

The larvae have been recorded feeding on a climbing rattan palm in the family Arecaceae.
