= List of butterflies of Guinea =

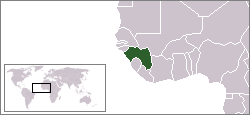
Location of Guinea

This is a list of butterflies of Guinea. About 583 species are known from Guinea, seven of which are endemic.

== Papilionidae ==
=== Papilioninae ===
==== Papilionini ====
- Papilio antimachus Drury, 1782
- Papilio zalmoxis Hewitson, 1864
- Papilio nireus Linnaeus, 1758
- Papilio chrapkowskoides nurettini Koçak, 1983
- Papilio sosia Rothschild & Jordan, 1903
- Papilio dardanus Brown, 1776
- Papilio phorcas Cramer, 1775
- Papilio zenobia Fabricius, 1775
- Papilio cyproeofila Butler, 1868
- Papilio demodocus Esper, [1798]
- Papilio horribilis Butler, 1874
- Papilio menestheus Drury, 1773

==== Leptocercini ====
- Graphium antheus (Cramer, 1779)
- Graphium policenes (Cramer, 1775)
- Graphium liponesco (Suffert, 1904)
- Graphium angolanus baronis (Ungemach, 1932)
- Graphium leonidas (Fabricius, 1793)
- Graphium tynderaeus (Fabricius, 1793)
- Graphium latreillianus (Godart, 1819)
- Graphium adamastor (Boisduval, 1836)
- Graphium almansor dufranei Collins & Larsen, 2008

== Pieridae ==
=== Pseudopontiinae ===
- Pseudopontia paradoxa (Felder & Felder, 1869)

=== Coliadinae ===
- Eurema brigitta (Stoll, [1780])
- Eurema desjardinsii marshalli (Butler, 1898)
- Eurema regularis (Butler, 1876)
- Eurema hapale (Mabille, 1882)
- Eurema hecabe solifera (Butler, 1875)
- Eurema senegalensis (Boisduval, 1836)
- Catopsilia florella (Fabricius, 1775)

=== Pierinae ===
- Colotis antevippe (Boisduval, 1836)
- Colotis euippe (Linnaeus, 1758)
- Colotis evagore antigone (Boisduval, 1836)
- Nepheronia argia (Fabricius, 1775)
- Nepheronia pharis (Boisduval, 1836)
- Nepheronia thalassina (Boisduval, 1836)
- Leptosia alcesta (Stoll, [1782])
- Leptosia hybrida Bernardi, 1952
- Leptosia medusa (Cramer, 1777)

==== Pierini ====
- Appias epaphia (Cramer, [1779])
- Appias sabina (Felder & Felder, [1865])
- Mylothris aburi Larsen & Collins, 2003
- Mylothris chloris (Fabricius, 1775)
- Mylothris hilara (Karsch, 1892)
- Mylothris poppea (Cramer, 1777)
- Mylothris schumanni Suffert, 1904
- Mylothris dimidiata Aurivillius, 1898
- Belenois aurota (Fabricius, 1793)
- Belenois calypso (Drury, 1773)
- Belenois creona (Cramer, [1776])
- Belenois hedyle ianthe (Doubleday, 1842)
- Belenois subeida (Felder & Felder, 1865)
- Belenois theora (Doubleday, 1846)

== Lycaenidae ==
=== Miletinae ===
==== Liphyrini ====
- Euliphyra hewitsoni Aurivillius, 1899
- Aslauga guineensis Collins & Libert, 1997

==== Miletini ====
- Spalgis lemolea lemolea Druce, 1890
- Spalgis lemolea pilos Druce, 1890
- Lachnocnema emperamus (Snellen, 1872)
- Lachnocnema vuattouxi Libert, 1996

=== Poritiinae ===
==== Liptenini ====
- Ptelina carnuta (Hewitson, 1873)
- Pentila abraxas (Westwood, 1851)
- Pentila bennetti Collins & Larsen, 2003
- Pentila hewitsoni (Grose-Smith & Kirby, 1887)
- Pentila pauli abri Collins & Larsen, 2001 (manuscript name)
- Pentila petreoides Bethune-Baker, 1915
- Pentila preussi preussi Staudinger, 1888
- Pentila preussi fayei Stempffer, 1963
- Ornipholidotos issia Stempffer, 1969
- Mimacraea neurata Holland, 1895
- Liptena albicans Cator, 1904
- Liptena alluaudi Mabille, 1890
- Liptena ferrymani bigoti Stempffer, 1964
- Liptena ferrymani bissau Collins & Larsen, 2003
- Liptena griveaudi Stempffer, 1969
- Liptena helena (Druce, 1888)
- Liptena septistrigata (Bethune-Baker, 1903)
- Liptena similis (Kirby, 1890)
- Liptena simplicia Möschler, 1887
- Liptena xanthostola coomassiensis Hawker-Smith, 1933
- Kakumia otlauga (Grose-Smith & Kirby, 1890)
- Tetrarhanis diversa (Bethune-Baker, 1904)
- Falcuna leonensis Stempffer & Bennett, 1963
- Larinopoda eurema (Plötz, 1880)
- Eresina maesseni Stempffer, 1956
- Eresiomera isca occidentalis Collins & Larsen, 1998
- Citrinophila similis (Kirby, 1887)

==== Epitolini ====
- Epitola posthumus (Fabricius, 1793)
- Epitola uranioides occidentalis Libert, 1999
- Cerautola crowleyi (Sharpe, 1890)
- Cerautola miranda (Staudinger, 1889)
- Stempfferia leonina (Staudinger, 1888)
- Stempfferia michelae Libert, 1999
- Cephetola cephena (Hewitson, 1873)
- Epitolina dispar (Kirby, 1887)
- Epitolina melissa (Druce, 1888)
- Aethiopana honorius divisa (Butler, 1901)
- Hewitsonia boisduvalii (Hewitson, 1869)
- Hewitsonia occidentalis Bouyer, 1997

=== Aphnaeinae ===
- Pseudaletis malangi Collins & Larsen, 1995
- Pseudaletis leonis (Staudinger, 1888)
- Pseudaletis richardi Stempffer, 1952
- Lipaphnaeus leonina (Sharpe, 1890)
- Cigaritis avriko (Karsch, 1893)
- Cigaritis iza (Hewitson, 1865)
- Cigaritis mozambica (Bertoloni, 1850)
- Cigaritis nilus (Hewitson, 1865)
- Zeritis neriene Boisduval, 1836
- Axiocerses harpax (Fabricius, 1775)
- Axiocerses amanga borealis Aurivillius, 1905
- Aphnaeus jefferyi Hawker-Smith, 1928
- Aphnaeus orcas (Drury, 1782)

=== Theclinae ===
- Myrina silenus (Fabricius, 1775)
- Myrina subornata Lathy, 1903
- Oxylides faunus (Drury, 1773)
- Dapidodigma hymen (Fabricius, 1775)
- Hypolycaena anara Larsen, 1986
- Hypolycaena antifaunus (Westwood, 1851)
- Hypolycaena dubia Aurivillius, 1895
- Hypolycaena hatita Hewitson, 1865
- Hypolycaena liara Druce, 1890
- Hypolycaena philippus (Fabricius, 1793)
- Hypolycaena scintillans Stempffer, 1957
- Iolaus eurisus eurisus (Cramer, 1779)
- Iolaus eurisus helius (Fabricius, 1781)
- Iolaus aethria Karsch, 1893
- Iolaus leonis (Riley, 1928)
- Iolaus djaloni Collins & Larsen, 1998
- Iolaus iasis Hewitson, 1865
- Iolaus maesa (Hewitson, 1862)
- Iolaus moyambina (Stempffer & Bennett, 1959)
- Iolaus normani meamui Collins & Larsen, 2005
- Iolaus menas Druce, 1890
- Iolaus alcibiades Kirby, 1871
- Iolaus calisto (Westwood, 1851)
- Iolaus mane Collins & Larsen, 2003
- Iolaus timon (Fabricius, 1787)
- Iolaus catori Bethune-Baker, 1904
- Iolaus kyabobo Larsen, 1996
- Stugeta marmoreus (Butler, 1866)
- Pilodeudorix catori (Bethune-Baker, 1903)
- Pilodeudorix leonina (Bethune-Baker, 1904)
- Pilodeudorix otraeda (Hewitson, 1863)
- Pilodeudorix caerulea (Druce, 1890)
- Pilodeudorix camerona (Plötz, 1880)
- Pilodeudorix diyllus diyllus (Hewitson, 1878)
- Pilodeudorix diyllus occidentalis Libert, 2004
- Pilodeudorix zela (Hewitson, 1869)
- Pilodeudorix aucta (Karsch, 1895)
- Pilodeudorix violetta (Aurivillius, 1897)
- Paradeudorix eleala viridis (Stempffer, 1964)
- Paradeudorix eleala parallela (Collins & Larsen, 2000)
- Paradeudorix petersi (Stempffer & Bennett, 1956)
- Hypomyrina mimetica Libert, 2004
- Deudorix antalus (Hopffer, 1855)
- Deudorix dinochares Grose-Smith, 1887
- Deudorix dinomenes diomedes Jackson, 1966
- Deudorix galathea (Swainson, 1821)
- Deudorix lorisona lorisona (Hewitson, 1862)
- Deudorix lorisona abriana Libert, 2004
- Deudorix odana Druce, 1887

=== Polyommatinae ===
==== Lycaenesthini ====
- Anthene amarah (Guérin-Méneville, 1849)
- Anthene crawshayi (Butler, 1899)
- Anthene definita (Butler, 1899)
- Anthene irumu (Stempffer, 1948)
- Anthene juba (Fabricius, 1787)
- Anthene larydas (Cramer, 1780)
- Anthene liodes (Hewitson, 1874)
- Anthene lunulata (Trimen, 1894)
- Anthene princeps (Butler, 1876)
- Anthene rubricinctus (Holland, 1891)
- Anthene starki Larsen, 2005
- Anthene sylvanus (Drury, 1773)
- Anthene chryseostictus (Bethune-Baker, 1910)
- Anthene lusones fulvimacula (Mabille, 1890)
- Anthene hades (Bethune-Baker, 1910)
- Anthene lamias (Hewitson, 1878)
- Anthene nigeriae (Aurivillius, 1905)
- Cupidesthes lithas (Druce, 1890)

==== Polyommatini ====
- Cupidopsis cissus (Godart, [1824])
- Cupidopsis jobates mauritanica Riley, 1932
- Pseudonacaduba sichela (Wallengren, 1857)
- Lampides boeticus (Linnaeus, 1767)
- Uranothauma belcastroi Larsen, 1997
- Uranothauma falkensteini (Dewitz, 1879)
- Phlyaria cyara stactalla Karsch, 1895
- Cacyreus audeoudi Stempffer, 1936
- Cacyreus lingeus (Stoll, 1782)
- Cacyreus virilis Stempffer, 1936
- Leptotes babaulti (Stempffer, 1935)
- Leptotes brevidentatus (Tite, 1958)
- Leptotes jeanneli (Stempffer, 1935)
- Leptotes pirithous (Linnaeus, 1767)
- Tuxentius carana kontu (Karsch, 1893)
- Tarucus rosacea (Austaut, 1885)
- Tarucus ungemachi Stempffer, 1942
- Zizeeria knysna (Trimen, 1862)
- Zizina antanossa (Mabille, 1877)
- Azanus jesous (Guérin-Méneville, 1849)
- Azanus mirza (Plötz, 1880)
- Azanus moriqua (Wallengren, 1857)
- Azanus isis (Drury, 1773)
- Eicochrysops dudgeoni Riley, 1929
- Eicochrysops hippocrates (Fabricius, 1793)
- Euchrysops albistriata greenwoodi d'Abrera, 1980
- Euchrysops malathana (Boisduval, 1833)
- Euchrysops osiris (Hopffer, 1855)
- Euchrysops reducta Hulstaert, 1924
- Thermoniphas micylus (Cramer, 1780)
- Oboronia guessfeldti (Dewitz, 1879)
- Oboronia ornata (Mabille, 1890)
- Oboronia punctatus (Dewitz, 1879)
- Lepidochrysops labeensis Larsen & Warren-Gash, 2000
- Lepidochrysops parsimon (Fabricius, 1775)
- Lepidochrysops synchrematiza (Bethune-Baker, [1923])

== Riodinidae ==
=== Nemeobiinae ===
- Abisara tantalus (Hewitson, 1861)

== Nymphalidae ==
=== Libytheinae ===
- Libythea labdaca Westwood, 1851

=== Danainae ===
==== Danaini ====
- Danaus chrysippus alcippus (Cramer, 1777)
- Tirumala petiverana (Doubleday, 1847)
- Amauris niavius (Linnaeus, 1758)
- Amauris tartarea Mabille, 1876
- Amauris damocles (Fabricius, 1793)
- Amauris hecate (Butler, 1866)

Satyrinae Melanitini

- Gnophodes betsimena parmeno Doubleday, 1849
- Melanitis leda (Linnaeus, 1758)
- Melanitis libya Distant, 1882

==== Satyrini ====
- Bicyclus abnormis (Dudgeon, 1909)
- Bicyclus angulosa (Butler, 1868)
- Bicyclus auricruda (Butler, 1868)
- Bicyclus campus (Karsch, 1893)
- Bicyclus dekeyseri (Condamin, 1958)
- Bicyclus dorothea (Cramer, 1779)
- Bicyclus ephorus Weymer, 1892
- Bicyclus evadne (Cramer, 1779)
- Bicyclus funebris (Guérin-Méneville, 1844)
- Bicyclus ignobilis (Butler, 1870)
- Bicyclus istaris (Plötz, 1880)
- Bicyclus madetes (Hewitson, 1874)
- Bicyclus mandanes Hewitson, 1873
- Bicyclus milyas (Hewitson, 1864)
- Bicyclus nobilis (Aurivillius, 1893)
- Bicyclus pavonis (Butler, 1876)
- Bicyclus procora (Karsch, 1893)
- Bicyclus safitza (Westwood, 1850)
- Bicyclus martius (Fabricius, 1793)
- Bicyclus sandace (Hewitson, 1877)
- Bicyclus sangmelinae Condamin, 1963
- Bicyclus taenias (Hewitson, 1877)
- Bicyclus trilophus jacksoni Condamin, 1961
- Bicyclus vulgaris (Butler, 1868)
- Bicyclus xeneas occidentalis Condamin, 1965
- Bicyclus zinebi (Butler, 1869)
- Hallelesis halyma (Fabricius, 1793)
- Heteropsis elisi (Karsch, 1893)
- Heteropsis peitho (Plötz, 1880)
- Ypthima antennata cornesi Kielland, 1982
- Ypthima asterope (Klug, 1832)
- Ypthima doleta Kirby, 1880
- Ypthima pupillaris Butler, 1888
- Ypthimomorpha itonia (Hewitson, 1865)

=== Charaxinae ===
==== Charaxini ====
- Charaxes varanes vologeses (Mabille, 1876)
- Charaxes fulvescens senegala van Someren, 1975
- Charaxes candiope (Godart, 1824)
- Charaxes protoclea Feisthamel, 1850
- Charaxes boueti Feisthamel, 1850
- Charaxes lucretius Cramer, [1775]
- Charaxes lactetinctus Karsch, 1892
- Charaxes jasius Poulton, 1926
- Charaxes epijasius Reiche, 1850
- Charaxes castor (Cramer, 1775)
- Charaxes brutus (Cramer, 1779)
- Charaxes pollux (Cramer, 1775)
- Charaxes eudoxus eudoxus (Drury, 1782)
- Charaxes eudoxus goubandana Nicat, 2002
- Charaxes numenes (Hewitson, 1859)
- Charaxes tiridates (Cramer, 1777)
- Charaxes smaragdalis butleri Rothschild, 1900
- Charaxes imperialis Butler, 1874
- Charaxes ameliae doumeti Henning, 1989
- Charaxes hadrianus Ward, 1871
- Charaxes nobilis claudei le Moult, 1933
- Charaxes fournierae jolybouyeri Vingerhoedt, 1998
- Charaxes zingha (Stoll, 1780)
- Charaxes etesipe (Godart, 1824)
- Charaxes achaemenes atlantica van Someren, 1970
- Charaxes eupale (Drury, 1782)
- Charaxes anticlea (Drury, 1782)
- Charaxes virilis van Someren & Jackson, 1952
- Charaxes etheocles (Cramer, 1777)
- Charaxes plantroui Minig, 1975
- Charaxes cedreatis Hewitson, 1874
- Charaxes viola Butler, 1866
- Charaxes northcotti Rothschild, 1899
- Charaxes pleione (Godart, 1824)
- Charaxes paphianus falcata (Butler, 1872)
- Charaxes nichetes leopardinus Plantrou, 1974
- Charaxes lycurgus (Fabricius, 1793)
- Charaxes zelica Butler, 1869
- Charaxes porthos gallayi van Someren, 1968

==== Euxanthini ====
- Euxanthe eurinome (Cramer, 1775)

==== Pallini ====
- Palla ussheri (Butler, 1870)
- Palla decius (Cramer, 1777)
- Palla violinitens (Crowley, 1890)

=== Apaturinae ===
- Apaturopsis cleochares (Hewitson, 1873)

=== Nymphalinae ===
- Kallimoides rumia (Doubleday, 1849)
- Vanessula milca (Hewitson, 1873)

==== Nymphalini ====
- Vanessa cardui (Linnaeus, 1758)
- Junonia chorimene (Guérin-Méneville, 1844)
- Junonia hierta cebrene Trimen, 1870
- Junonia oenone (Linnaeus, 1758)
- Junonia orithya madagascariensis Guenée, 1865
- Junonia sophia (Fabricius, 1793)
- Junonia stygia (Aurivillius, 1894)
- Junonia terea (Drury, 1773)
- Junonia westermanni Westwood, 1870
- Junonia cymodoce (Cramer, 1777)
- Salamis cacta (Fabricius, 1793)
- Protogoniomorpha parhassus (Drury, 1782)
- Protogoniomorpha cytora (Doubleday, 1847)
- Precis antilope (Feisthamel, 1850)
- Precis ceryne ceruana Rothschild & Jordan, 190
- Precis coelestina Dewitz, 1879
- Precis frobeniusi Strand, 1909
- Precis octavia (Cramer, 1777)
- Precis pelarga (Fabricius, 1775)
- Precis sinuata Plötz, 1880
- Hypolimnas anthedon (Doubleday, 1845)
- Hypolimnas aubergeri Hecq, 1987
- Hypolimnas misippus (Linnaeus, 1764)
- Catacroptera cloanthe ligata Rothschild & Jordan, 1903

=== Cyrestinae ===
==== Cyrestini ====
- Cyrestis camillus (Fabricius, 1781)

=== Biblidinae ===
==== Biblidini ====
- Byblia anvatara crameri Aurivillius, 1894
- Mesoxantha ethosea (Drury, 1782)
- Neptidopsis ophione (Cramer, 1777)
- Eurytela dryope (Cramer, [1775])

==== Epicaliini ====
- Sevenia umbrina (Karsch, 1892)

=== Limenitinae ===
==== Limenitidini ====
- Harma theobene Doubleday, 1848
- Cymothoe adela Staudinger, 1890
- Cymothoe althea (Cramer, 1776)
- Cymothoe aubergeri Plantrou, 1977
- Cymothoe caenis (Drury, 1773)
- Cymothoe fumana (Westwood, 1850)
- Cymothoe hartigi Belcastro, 1990
- Cymothoe jodutta (Westwood, 1850)
- Cymothoe mabillei Overlaet, 1944
- Cymothoe sangaris (Godart, 1824)
- Pseudoneptis bugandensis ianthe Hemming, 1964
- Pseudacraea boisduvalii (Doubleday, 1845)
- Pseudacraea eurytus (Linnaeus, 1758)
- Pseudacraea lucretia (Cramer, [1775])
- Pseudacraea semire (Cramer, 1779)
- Pseudacraea warburgi Aurivillius, 1892

==== Neptidini ====
- Neptis alta Overlaet, 1955
- Neptis najo Karsch, 1893
- Neptis kiriakoffi Overlaet, 1955
- Neptis melicerta (Drury, 1773)
- Neptis metella (Doubleday, 1848)
- Neptis morosa Overlaet, 1955
- Neptis nebrodes Hewitson, 1874
- Neptis nemetes Hewitson, 1868
- Neptis quintilla Mabille, 1890
- Neptis serena Overlaet, 1955

==== Adoliadini ====
- Catuna crithea (Drury, 1773)
- Euryphura chalcis (Felder & Felder, 1860)
- Hamanumida daedalus (Fabricius, 1775)
- Aterica galene (Brown, 1776)
- Cynandra opis (Drury, 1773)
- Euriphene ampedusa (Hewitson, 1866)
- Euriphene atossa (Hewitson, 1865)
- Euriphene coerulea Boisduval, 1847
- Euriphene gambiae gambiae Feisthamel, 1850
- Euriphene gambiae vera Hecq, 2002
- Euriphene simplex (Staudinger, 1891)
- Euriphene veronica (Stoll, 1780)
- Bebearia osyris (Schultze, 1920)
- Bebearia absolon (Fabricius, 1793)
- Bebearia mandinga (Felder & Felder, 1860)
- Bebearia barce (Doubleday, 1847)
- Bebearia mardania (Fabricius, 1793)
- Bebearia cocalia (Fabricius, 1793)
- Bebearia senegalensis (Herrich-Schaeffer, 1858)
- Bebearia sophus sophus (Fabricius, 1793)
- Bebearia sophus phreone (Feisthamel, 1850)
- Bebearia arcadius (Fabricius, 1793)
- Bebearia laetitia (Plötz, 1880)
- Bebearia phantasina phantasina (Staudinger, 1891)
- Bebearia phantasina ultima Hecq, 1990
- Bebearia demetra (Godart, 1824)
- Euphaedra medon pholus (van der Hoeven, 1840)
- Euphaedra gausape (Butler, 1866)
- Euphaedra judith Weymer, 1892
- Euphaedra melpomene aubergeriana Hecq, 1981
- Euphaedra hastiri Hecq, 1981
- Euphaedra pallas Hecq, 2004
- Euphaedra xypete (Hewitson, 1865)
- Euphaedra hebes Hecq, 1980
- Euphaedra diffusa albocoerulea Hecq, 1976
- Euphaedra crockeri (Butler, 1869)
- Euphaedra eusemoides (Grose-Smith & Kirby, 1889)
- Euphaedra cyparissa nimbina Pyrcz & Warren-Gash, 2013
- Euphaedra sarcoptera ferrea Pyrcz & Warren-Gash, 2013
- Euphaedra sarcoptera sarcoptera (Butler, 1871)
- Euphaedra themis (Hübner, 1807)
- Euphaedra dubreka Collins & Larsen, 2005
- Euphaedra laboureana laboureana de Toulgëot, 1957
- Euphaedra laboureana eburnensis Hecq, 1979
- Euphaedra modesta Hecq, 1982
- Euphaedra janetta (Butler, 1871)
- Euphaedra aberrans Staudinger, 1891
- Euphaedra occulta Hecq, 1982
- Euphaedra ceres (Fabricius, 1775)
- Euphaedra inanum (Butler, 1873)
- Euphaedra phaethusa aurea Hecq, 1983
- Euphaedra villiersi Condamin, 1964
- Euphaedra tenebrosa Hecq, 1983
- Euphaedra eleus (Drury, 1782)
- Euphaedra edwardsii (van der Hoeven, 1845)
- Euphaedra perseis (Drury, 1773)
- Euphaedra harpalyce (Cramer, 1777)
- Euphaedra eupalus (Fabricius, 1781)
- Euptera dorothea dorothea Bethune-Baker, 1904
- Euptera dorothea warrengashi Libert, 2002
- Pseudathyma falcata Jackson, 1969
- Pseudathyma neptidina Karsch, 1894
- Pseudathyma plutonica sibyllina (Staudinger, 1890)

=== Heliconiinae ===
==== Acraeini ====
- Acraea camaena (Drury, 1773)
- Acraea endoscota Le Doux, 1928
- Acraea neobule Doubleday, 1847
- Acraea quirina (Fabricius, 1781)
- Acraea zetes (Linnaeus, 1758)
- Acraea egina (Cramer, 1775)
- Acraea caecilia (Fabricius, 1781)
- Acraea pseudegina Westwood, 1852
- Acraea rogersi Hewitson, 1873
- Acraea alcinoe Felder & Felder, 1865
- Acraea macaria (Fabricius, 1793)
- Acraea umbra carpenteri (Le Doux, 1937)
- Acraea vestalis Felder & Felder, 1865
- Acraea acerata Hewitson, 1874
- Acraea alciope Hewitson, 1852
- Acraea pseudepaea Dudgeon, 1909
- Acraea bonasia (Fabricius, 1775)
- Acraea encedana Pierre, 1976
- Acraea encedon (Linnaeus, 1758)
- Acraea serena (Fabricius, 1775)
- Acraea jodutta (Fabricius, 1793)
- Acraea peneleos Ward, 1871
- Acraea polis Pierre, 1999
- Acraea pharsalus Ward, 1871
- Acraea vesperalis Grose-Smith, 1890
- Acraea parrhasia (Fabricius, 1793)

==== Vagrantini ====
- Lachnoptera anticlia (Hübner, 1819)
- Phalanta eurytis (Doubleday, 1847)
- Phalanta phalantha aethiopica (Rothschild & Jordan, 1903)

== Hesperiidae ==
=== Coeliadinae ===
- Coeliades aeschylus (Plötz, 1884)
- Coeliades bixana Evans, 1940
- Coeliades chalybe (Westwood, 1852)
- Coeliades forestan (Stoll, [1782])
- Coeliades hanno (Plötz, 1879)
- Coeliades pisistratus (Fabricius, 1793)
- Pyrrhochalcia iphis (Drury, 1773)

=== Pyrginae ===
==== Celaenorrhinini ====
- Celaenorrhinus galenus (Fabricius, 1793)
- Celaenorrhinus leona Berger, 1975
- Celaenorrhinus meditrina (Hewitson, 1877)
- Celaenorrhinus proxima maesseni Berger, 1976
- Celaenorrhinus rutilans (Mabille, 1877)
- Eretis lugens (Rogenhofer, 1891)
- Eretis melania Mabille, 1891
- Eretis plistonicus (Plötz, 1879)
- Sarangesa bouvieri (Mabille, 1877)
- Sarangesa brigida (Plötz, 1879)
- Sarangesa laelius (Mabille, 1877)
- Sarangesa majorella (Mabille, 1891)
- Sarangesa phidyle (Walker, 1870)
- Sarangesa tertullianus (Fabricius, 1793)
- Sarangesa thecla (Plötz, 1879)

==== Tagiadini ====
- Tagiades flesus (Fabricius, 1781)
- Eagris decastigma Mabille, 1891
- Eagris denuba (Plötz, 1879)
- Eagris hereus quaterna (Mabille, 1890)
- Eagris subalbida (Holland, 1893)
- Eagris tetrastigma subolivescens (Holland, 1892)
- Calleagris lacteus dannatti (Ehrmann, 1893)
- Caprona adelica Karsch, 1892
- Netrobalane canopus (Trimen, 1864)
- Abantis bismarcki Karsch, 1892
- Abantis elegantula (Mabille, 1890)
- Abantis leucogaster (Mabille, 1890)
- Abantis lucretia Druce, 1909
- Abantis nigeriana Butler, 1901
- Abantis pseudonigeriana Usher, 1984

==== Carcharodini ====
- Spialia diomus (Hopffer, 1855)
- Spialia dromus (Plötz, 1884)
- Spialia ploetzi occidentalis de Jong, 1977
- Spialia spio (Linnaeus, 1764)
- Gomalia elma (Trimen, 1862)

=== Hesperiinae ===
==== Aeromachini ====
- Astictopterus abjecta (Snellen, 1872)
- Astictopterus anomoeus (Plötz, 1879)
- Prosopalpus debilis (Plötz, 1879)
- Prosopalpus saga Evans, 1937
- Prosopalpus styla Evans, 1937
- Gorgyra aretina (Hewitson, 1878)
- Gorgyra diversata Evans, 1937
- Gorgyra heterochrus (Mabille, 1890)
- Gorgyra minima Holland, 1896
- Gorgyra subfacatus (Mabille, 1890)
- Gyrogra subnotata (Holland, 1894)
- Teniorhinus watsoni Holland, 1892
- Ceratrichia clara Evans, 1937
- Ceratrichia nothus (Fabricius, 1787)
- Ceratrichia phocion (Fabricius, 1781)
- Ceratrichia semilutea Mabille, 1891
- Pardaleodes edipus (Stoll, 1781)
- Pardaleodes incerta murcia (Plötz, 1883)
- Pardaleodes sator (Westwood, 1852)
- Pardaleodes tibullus (Fabricius, 1793)
- Xanthodisca rega (Mabille, 1890)
- Rhabdomantis galatia (Hewitson, 1868)
- Rhabdomantis sosia (Mabille, 1891)
- Osmodes adon (Mabille, 1890)
- Osmodes costatus Aurivillius, 1896
- Osmodes distincta Holland, 1896
- Osmodes laronia (Hewitson, 1868)
- Osmodes lindseyi occidentalis Miller, 1971
- Osmodes omar Swinhoe, 1916
- Osmodes thora (Plötz, 1884)
- Parosmodes morantii axis Evans, 1937
- Osphantes ogowena (Mabille, 1891)
- Acleros mackenii olaus (Plötz, 1884)
- Acleros ploetzi Mabille, 1890
- Semalea arela (Mabille, 1891)
- Semalea pulvina (Plötz, 1879)
- Semalea sextilis (Plötz, 1886)
- Hypoleucis tripunctata Mabille, 1891
- Meza cybeutes volta Miller, 1971
- Meza elba (Evans, 1937)
- Meza leucophaea (Holland, 1894)
- Meza mabea (Holland, 1894)
- Meza mabillei (Holland, 1893)
- Meza meza (Hewitson, 1877)
- Paronymus budonga (Evans, 1938)
- Paronymus nevea (Druce, 1910)
- Paronymus xanthias (Mabille, 1891)
- Andronymus caesar (Fabricius, 1793)
- Andronymus hero Evans, 1937
- Zophopetes cerymica (Hewitson, 1867)
- Zophopetes quaternata (Mabille, 1876)
- Gamia shelleyi (Sharpe, 1890)
- Artitropa comus (Stoll, 1782)
- Mopala orma (Plötz, 1879)
- Gretna waga (Plötz, 1886)
- Pteroteinon caenira (Hewitson, 1867)
- Pteroteinon laufella (Hewitson, 1868)
- Pteroteinon pruna Evans, 1937
- Leona leonora (Plötz, 1879)
- Leona halma Evans, 1937
- Caenides soritia (Hewitson, 1876)
- Caenides dacela (Hewitson, 1876)
- Caenides hidaroides Aurivillius, 1896
- Caenides dacena (Hewitson, 1876)
- Monza alberti (Holland, 1896)
- Monza cretacea (Snellen, 1872)
- Melphina noctula (Druce, 1909)
- Fresna cojo (Karsch, 1893)
- Fresna netopha (Hewitson, 1878)
- Fresna nyassae (Hewitson, 1878)
- Platylesches affinissima Strand, 1921
- Platylesches batangae (Holland, 1894)
- Platylesches chamaeleon (Mabille, 1891)
- Platylesches galesa (Hewitson, 1877)
- Platylesches moritili (Wallengren, 1857)
- Platylesches picanini (Holland, 1894)
- Platylesches robustus fofi Larsen & Mei, 1998
- Platylesches rossii Belcastro, 1986

==== Baorini ====
- Pelopidas mathias (Fabricius, 1798)
- Pelopidas thrax (Hübner, 1821)
- Borbo borbonica (Boisduval, 1833)
- Borbo fallax (Gaede, 1916)
- Borbo fanta (Evans, 1937)
- Borbo fatuellus (Hopffer, 1855)
- Borbo gemella (Mabille, 1884)
- Borbo holtzi (Plötz, 1883)
- Borbo perobscura (Druce, 1912)
- Parnara monasi (Trimen & Bowker, 1889)
- Gegenes hottentota (Latreille, 1824)
- Gegenes niso brevicornis (Plötz, 1884)
- Gegenes pumilio gambica (Mabille, 1878)

=== Heteropterinae ===
- Metisella tsadicus (Aurivillius, 1905)

== See also ==
- List of moths of Guinea
- Wildlife of Guinea
