= List of butterflies of Guinea-Bissau =

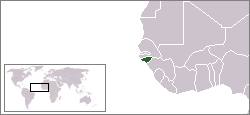
Location of Guinea-Bissau

About 154 species of butterfly are known from Guinea-Bissau, none of which are endemic.

== Papilionidae ==
=== Papilioninae ===
==== Papilionini ====
- Papilio nireus Linnaeus, 1758
- Papilio dardanus Brown, 1776
- Papilio demodocus Esper, [1798]
- Papilio menestheus Drury, 1773

==== Leptocercini ====
- Graphium angolanus baronis (Ungemach, 1932)
- Graphium leonidas (Fabricius, 1793)

== Pieridae ==
=== Coliadinae ===
- Eurema brigitta (Stoll, [1780])
- Eurema hecabe solifera (Butler, 1875)
- Catopsilia florella (Fabricius, 1775)

=== Pierinae ===
- Colotis antevippe (Boisduval, 1836)
- Colotis euippe (Linnaeus, 1758)
- Nepheronia argia (Fabricius, 1775)
- Leptosia alcesta (Stoll, [1782])
- Leptosia medusa (Cramer, 1777)

==== Pierini ====
- Mylothris chloris (Fabricius, 1775)
- Dixeia orbona (Geyer, [1837])
- Belenois aurota (Fabricius, 1793)
- Belenois calypso (Drury, 1773)
- Belenois hedyle ianthe (Doubleday, 1842)

== Lycaenidae ==
=== Miletinae ===
==== Miletini ====
- Spalgis lemolea lemolea Druce, 1890
- Spalgis lemolea pilos Druce, 1890

=== Poritiinae ===
==== Liptenini ====
- Liptena ferrymani bissau Collins & Larsen, 2003
- Pseuderesia eleaza (Hewitson, 1873)
- Eresina maesseni Stempffer, 1956

==== Epitolini ====
- Cerautola crowleyi (Sharpe, 1890)

=== Aphnaeinae ===
- Cigaritis mozambica (Bertoloni, 1850)
- Axiocerses harpax (Fabricius, 1775)
- Aphnaeus orcas (Drury, 1782)

=== Theclinae ===
- Myrina silenus (Fabricius, 1775)
- Myrina subornata Lathy, 1903
- Oxylides faunus (Drury, 1773)
- Dapidodigma hymen (Fabricius, 1775)
- Hypolycaena anara Larsen, 1986
- Hypolycaena philippus (Fabricius, 1793)
- Iolaus ismenias (Klug, 1834)
- Iolaus calisto (Westwood, 1851)
- Pilodeudorix zela (Hewitson, 1869)
- Pilodeudorix aurivilliusi (Stempffer, 1954)
- Paradeudorix eleala parallela (Collins & Larsen, 2000)
- Paradeudorix eleala cufadana (Mendes & De Sousa, 2003)
- Hypomyrina mimetica Libert, 2004
- Deudorix antalus (Hopffer, 1855)
- Deudorix lorisona abriana Libert, 2004

=== Polyommatinae ===
==== Lycaenesthini ====
- Anthene amarah (Guérin-Méneville, 1849)
- Anthene crawshayi (Butler, 1899)
- Anthene larydas (Cramer, 1780)
- Anthene liodes (Hewitson, 1874)
- Anthene sylvanus (Drury, 1773)
- Anthene hades (Bethune-Baker, 1910)

==== Polyommatini ====
- Lampides boeticus (Linnaeus, 1767)
- Cacyreus lingeus (Stoll, 1782)
- Zizeeria knysna (Trimen, 1862)
- Azanus mirza (Plötz, 1880)
- Azanus isis (Drury, 1773)
- Euchrysops malathana (Boisduval, 1833)
- Euchrysops osiris (Hopffer, 1855)
- Oboronia guessfeldti (Dewitz, 1879)
- Chilades eleusis (Demaison, 1888)

== Nymphalidae ==
=== Danainae ===
==== Danaini ====
- Danaus chrysippus alcippus (Cramer, 1777)
- Amauris niavius (Linnaeus, 1758)

=== Satyrinae ===
==== Melanitini ====
- Melanitis leda (Linnaeus, 1758)
- Melanitis libya Distant, 1882

==== Satyrini ====
- Bicyclus angulosa (Butler, 1868)
- Bicyclus dorothea (Cramer, 1779)
- Bicyclus funebris (Guérin-Méneville, 1844)
- Bicyclus mandanes Hewitson, 1873
- Bicyclus milyas (Hewitson, 1864)
- Bicyclus safitza (Westwood, 1850)
- Bicyclus taenias (Hewitson, 1877)
- Bicyclus vulgaris (Butler, 1868)
- Bicyclus zinebi (Butler, 1869)
- Ypthima doleta Kirby, 1880
- Ypthimomorpha itonia (Hewitson, 1865)

=== Charaxinae ===
==== Charaxini ====
- Charaxes varanes vologeses (Mabille, 1876)
- Charaxes fulvescens senegala van Someren, 1975
- Charaxes protoclea Feisthamel, 1850
- Charaxes boueti Feisthamel, 1850
- Charaxes jasius Poulton, 1926
- Charaxes epijasius Reiche, 1850
- Charaxes castor (Cramer, 1775)
- Charaxes brutus (Cramer, 1779)
- Charaxes numenes (Hewitson, 1859)
- Charaxes imperialis Butler, 1874
- Charaxes anticlea (Drury, 1782)
- Charaxes viola Butler, 1866

=== Nymphalinae ===
==== Nymphalini ====
- Vanessa cardui (Linnaeus, 1758)
- Junonia chorimene (Guérin-Méneville, 1844)
- Junonia hierta cebrene Trimen, 1870
- Junonia oenone (Linnaeus, 1758)
- Junonia orithya madagascariensis Guenée, 1865
- Junonia sophia (Fabricius, 1793)
- Junonia stygia (Aurivillius, 1894)
- Junonia terea (Drury, 1773)
- Precis antilope (Feisthamel, 1850)
- Precis pelarga (Fabricius, 1775)
- Hypolimnas anthedon (Doubleday, 1845)
- Hypolimnas misippus (Linnaeus, 1764)

=== Biblidinae ===
==== Biblidini ====
- Byblia anvatara crameri Aurivillius, 1894

=== Limenitinae ===
==== Limenitidini ====
- Cymothoe mabillei Overlaet, 1944
- Pseudacraea eurytus (Linnaeus, 1758)
- Pseudacraea lucretia (Cramer, [1775])

==== Neptidini ====
- Neptis agouale Pierre-Baltus, 1978
- Neptis kiriakoffi Overlaet, 1955
- Neptis melicerta (Drury, 1773)
- Neptis nemetes Hewitson, 1868
- Neptis quintilla Mabille, 1890
- Neptis nysiades Hewitson, 1868
- Neptis serena Overlaet, 1955

==== Adoliadini ====
- Hamanumida daedalus (Fabricius, 1775)
- Aterica galene (Brown, 1776)
- Euriphene ampedusa (Hewitson, 1866)
- Euriphene gambiae Feisthamel, 1850
- Bebearia cocalia (Fabricius, 1793)
- Bebearia senegalensis (Herrich-Schaeffer, 1858)
- Bebearia sophus phreone (Feisthamel, 1850)
- Bebearia phantasina ultima Hecq, 1990
- Euphaedra medon pholus (van der Hoeven, 1840)
- Euphaedra hastiri Hecq, 1981
- Euphaedra xypete (Hewitson, 1865)
- Euphaedra inanum (Butler, 1873)
- Euphaedra villiersi Condamin, 1964
- Euphaedra harpalyce (Cramer, 1777)

=== Heliconiinae ===
==== Acraeini ====
- Acraea camaena (Drury, 1773)
- Acraea neobule Doubleday, 1847
- Acraea zetes (Linnaeus, 1758)
- Acraea egina (Cramer, 1775)
- Acraea caecilia (Fabricius, 1781)
- Acraea pseudegina Westwood, 1852
- Acraea alcinoe Felder & Felder, 1865
- Acraea epaea (Cramer, 1779)
- Acraea umbra carpenteri (Le Doux, 1937)
- Acraea bonasia (Fabricius, 1775)
- Acraea encedon (Linnaeus, 1758)
- Acraea serena (Fabricius, 1775)

==== Vagrantini ====
- Phalanta phalantha aethiopica (Rothschild & Jordan, 1903)

== Hesperiidae ==
=== Coeliadinae ===
- Coeliades aeschylus (Plötz, 1884)
- Coeliades forestan (Stoll, [1782])
- Coeliades pisistratus (Fabricius, 1793)

=== Pyrginae ===
==== Celaenorrhinini ====
- Sarangesa brigida (Plötz, 1879)

==== Tagiadini ====
- Tagiades flesus (Fabricius, 1781)

==== Carcharodini ====
- Spialia ploetzi occidentalis de Jong, 1977
- Spialia spio (Linnaeus, 1764)

=== Hesperiinae ===
==== Aeromachini ====
- Gorgyra subfacatus (Mabille, 1890)
- Pardaleodes incerta murcia (Plötz, 1883)
- Xanthodisca rega (Mabille, 1890)
- Acleros ploetzi Mabille, 1890
- Semalea pulvina (Plötz, 1879)
- Meza indusiata (Mabille, 1891)
- Meza meza (Hewitson, 1877)
- Zophopetes cerymica (Hewitson, 1867)
- Fresna cojo (Karsch, 1893)

==== Baorini ====
- Pelopidas thrax (Hübner, 1821)
- Borbo fatuellus (Hopffer, 1855)
- Borbo gemella (Mabille, 1884)
- Gegenes niso brevicornis (Plötz, 1884)

== See also ==
- Geography of Guinea-Bissau
- Wildlife of Guinea-Bissau
