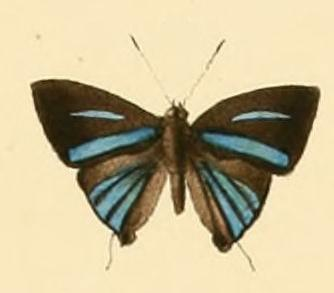

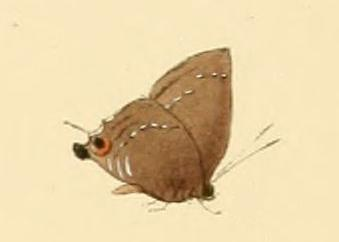

Scientific classification
- Kingdom: Animalia
- Phylum: Arthropoda
- Clade: Pancrustacea
- Class: Insecta
- Order: Lepidoptera
- Family: Lycaenidae
- Genus: Pilodeudorix
- Species: P. diyllus

Binomial name
- Pilodeudorix diyllus (Hewitson, 1878)

Synonyms
- Deudorix diyllus Hewitson, 1878; Hypolycaena debilis Staudinger, 1891

= Pilodeudorix diyllus =

Species of butterfly

Pilodeudorix diyllus, the green-streaked playboy, is a butterfly in the family Lycaenidae. It is found in Senegal, the Gambia, Guinea, Sierra Leone, Liberia, Ivory Coast, Ghana, Togo, Nigeria and Cameroon. The habitat consists of forests.

Adults have been recorded feeding from the flowers of Eupatorium odorata.

The larvae feed on Pterocarpus esculenta. They are attended by ants of the genus Oecophylla.

== Subspecies ==
- Pilodeudorix diyllus diyllus (Guinea, Sierra Leone, Liberia, Ivory Coast, Ghana, Togo, Nigeria: south and the Cross River loop, western Cameroon)
- Pilodeudorix diyllus occidentalis Libert, 2004 (Senegal, Gambia, Guinea)

Torben Larsen developed a species numbering system for his 2005 publication Butterflies of West Africa. The nominate subspecies is #458. The 'Larsen' numbers have since been used with permission in A Sharp Eye on Butterflies of Ghana.
