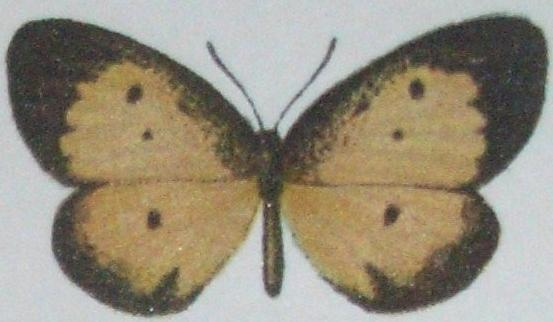

Scientific classification
- Domain: Eukaryota
- Kingdom: Animalia
- Phylum: Arthropoda
- Class: Insecta
- Order: Lepidoptera
- Family: Lycaenidae
- Genus: Pentila
- Species: P. preussi

Binomial name
- Pentila preussi Staudinger, 1888

Synonyms
- Pseuderesia paucipunctata Kirby, 1890; Tingra lunaris Weymer, 1892

= Pentila preussi =

Species of butterfly

Pentila preussi, the ochreous red pentila, is a butterfly in the family Lycaenidae. It is found in Senegal, Guinea, Sierra Leone and Ivory Coast. Their habitat consists primarily of drier forests.

== Subspecies ==
- Pentila preussi preussi (Guinea, Sierra Leone, western Ivory Coast)
- Pentila preussi fayei Stempffer, 1963 (Senegal, coast of Guinea)
