= Euptera dorothea =

Scientific classification
- Domain: Eukaryota
- Kingdom: Animalia
- Phylum: Arthropoda
- Class: Insecta
- Order: Lepidoptera
- Family: Nymphalidae
- Genus: Euptera
- Species: E. dorothea

Binomial name
- Euptera dorothea Bethune-Baker, 1904

Species of butterfly

Euptera dorothea, the western euptera, is a butterfly in the family Nymphalidae. It is found in Guinea, Sierra Leone, Ivory Coast and Ghana. The habitat consists of forests.

== Subspecies ==
- Euptera dorothea dorothea (Guinea, Sierra Leone)
- Euptera dorothea warrengashi Libert, 2002 (Guinea, Ivory Coast, western Ghana)
  (named in honour of Haydon Warren-Gash)
