= Euphaedra laboureana =

Scientific classification
- Kingdom: Animalia
- Phylum: Arthropoda
- Clade: Pancrustacea
- Class: Insecta
- Order: Lepidoptera
- Family: Nymphalidae
- Genus: Euphaedra
- Species: E. laboureana

Binomial name
- Euphaedra laboureana de Toulgëot, 1957

Synonyms
- Euphaedra themis laboureana; Euphaedra (Euphaedrana) laboureana; Euphaedra eburnensis Hecq, 1979; Euphaedra eburnensis bernaudi Hecq, 1996

Species of butterfly

Euphaedra laboureana, the brownish Themis forester, is a butterfly in the family Nymphalidae. It is found in Guinea, Sierra Leone, Liberia, Ivory Coast, and Ghana.

The larvae feed on Deinbollia pinnata.

== Subspecies ==
- Euphaedra laboureana laboureana (eastern Guinea, northern Sierra Leone)
- Euphaedra laboureana bernaudi Hecq, 1996 (Cameroon)
- Euphaedra laboureana eburnensis Hecq, 1979 (north-eastern Guinea, southern Sierra Leone, Liberia, Ivory Coast, Ghana)

Torben Larsen developed a species numbering system for his 2005 publication Butterflies of West Africa. The subspecies eburnensis is #1067. The 'Larsen' numbers have since been used with permission in A Sharp Eye on Butterflies of Ghana.
