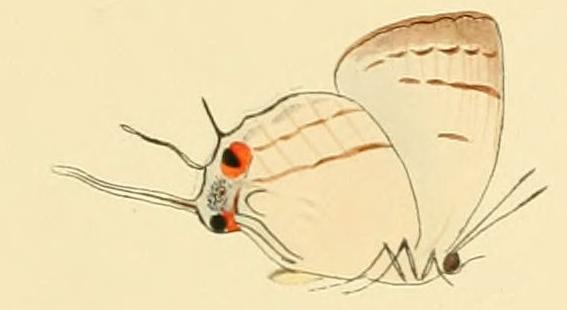

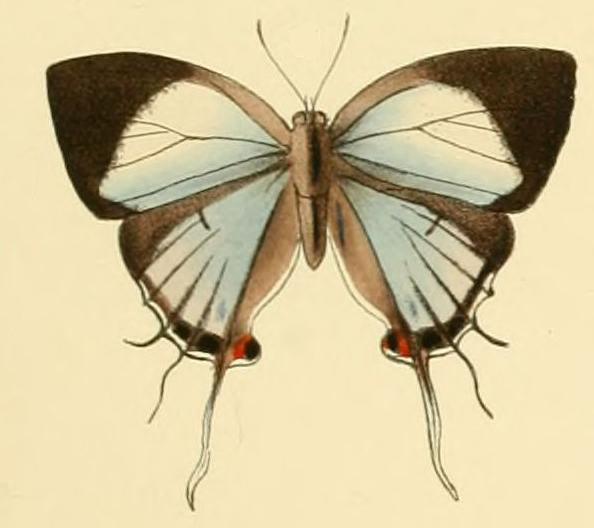

Scientific classification
- Kingdom: Animalia
- Phylum: Arthropoda
- Clade: Pancrustacea
- Class: Insecta
- Order: Lepidoptera
- Family: Lycaenidae
- Genus: Iolaus
- Species: I. eurisus

Binomial name
- Iolaus eurisus (Cramer, 1779)

Synonyms
- Papilio eurisus Cramer, 1779; Iolaus (Iolaus) eurisus; Jolaus thuraui Suffert, 1904; Papilio helius Fabricius, 1781; Iolaus vexillarius Clench, 1964

= Iolaus eurisus =

Species of butterfly

Iolaus eurisus, the royal sapphire, is a butterfly in the family Lycaenidae. It is found in Senegal, Guinea, Sierra Leone, Ivory Coast, Ghana, Togo, Nigeria, Cameroon, Equatorial Guinea, Gabon and the Democratic Republic of the Congo. The habitat consists of forests and disturbed and dry areas.

Adult males mud-puddle.

== Subspecies ==
- Iolaus eurisus eurisus (Guinea: from Conakry eastwards, Sierra Leone, Ivory Coast, Ghana, Togo, Nigeria: south and the Cross River loop)
- Iolaus eurisus helius (Fabricius, 1781) (Senegal, western Guinea)
- Iolaus eurisus vexillarius Clench, 1964 (Cameroon, Equatorial Guinea: Bioko, Gabon)

Torben Larsen developed a species numbering system for his 2005 publication Butterflies of West Africa. The nominate subspecies is #392. The 'Larsen' numbers have since been used with permission in A Sharp Eye on Butterflies of Ghana.
