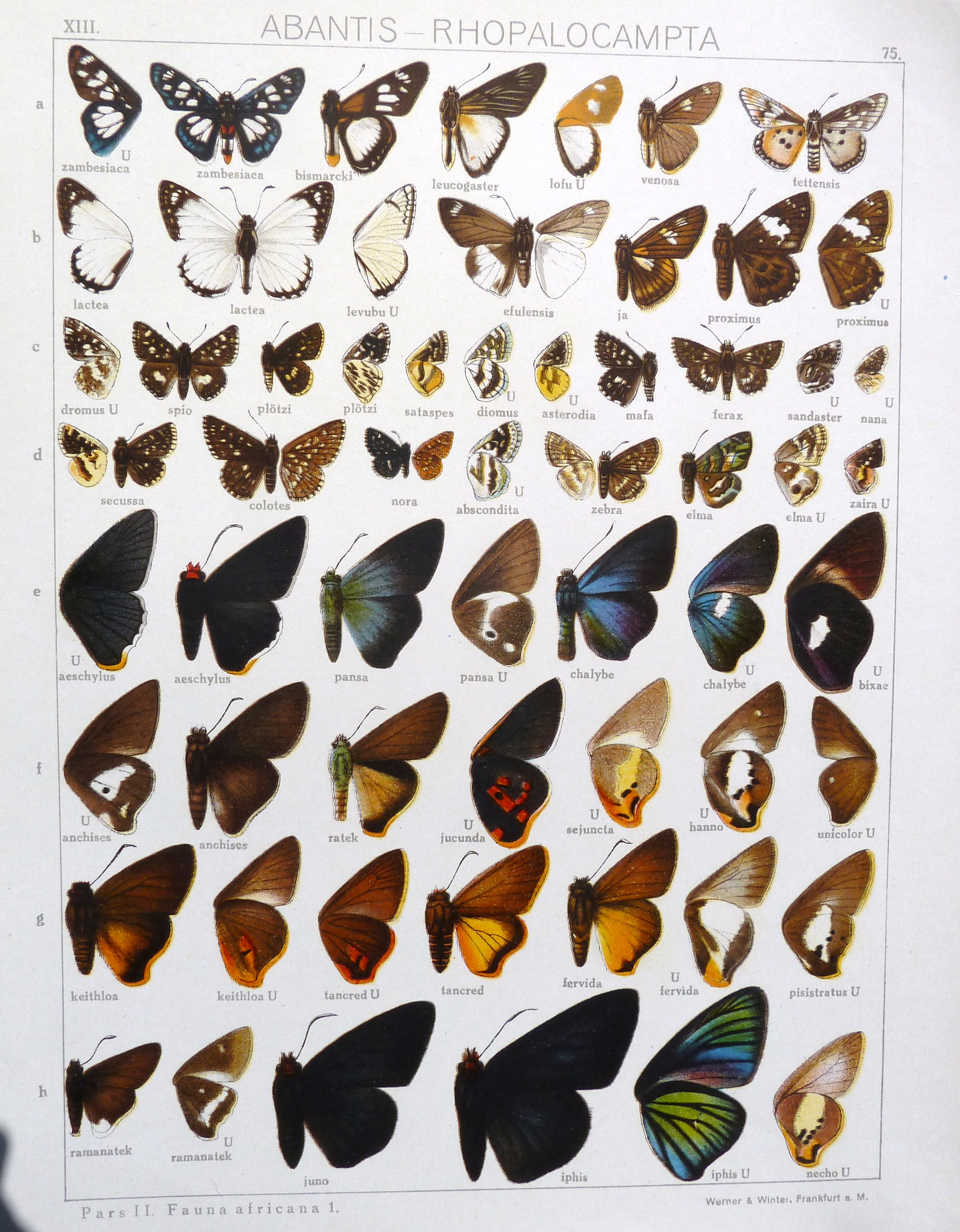

Scientific classification
- Kingdom: Animalia
- Phylum: Arthropoda
- Clade: Pancrustacea
- Class: Insecta
- Order: Lepidoptera
- Family: Hesperiidae
- Genus: Coeliades
- Species: C. aeschylus

Binomial name
- Coeliades aeschylus (Plötz, 1884)

Synonyms
- Ismene aeschylus Plötz, 1884

= Coeliades aeschylus =

Senegal blue policeman

Species of butterfly

Coeliades aeschylus, the Senegal blue policeman, is a butterfly of the family Hesperiidae. It is found in Senegal, Gambia, Guinea-Bissau, Mali, Guinea, Burkina Faso, and Sierra Leone (north). The habitat consists of the Guinea savanna zone.

The larvae feed on Acridocarpus smeathmanni.
