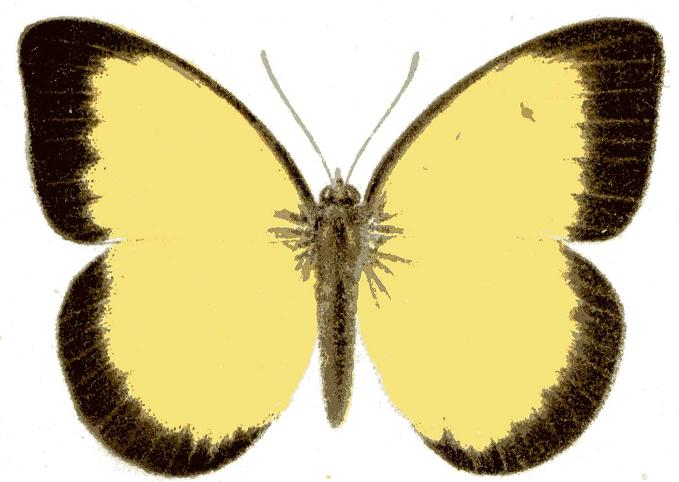

Scientific classification
- Kingdom: Animalia
- Phylum: Arthropoda
- Clade: Pancrustacea
- Class: Insecta
- Order: Lepidoptera
- Family: Pieridae
- Genus: Belenois
- Species: B. hedyle

Binomial name
- Belenois hedyle (Cramer, 1777)

Synonyms
- Papilio hedyle Cramer, 1777; Papilio sordidiflavicans Goeze, 1779; Pieris ianthe Doubleday, 1842; Belenois ianthe f. albunea Talbot, 1943; Belenois ianthe f. albicans Talbot, 1943; Belenois ianthe f. arenosa Talbot, 1943; Belenois ianthe f. popularis Talbot, 1943; Belenois ianthe f. asseris Talbot, 1943; Pieris rhena Doubleday, 1846; Belenois hedyle f. fumosa Talbot, 1943

= Belenois hedyle =

Western yellow caper white

Species of butterfly

Belenois hedyle, the western yellow caper white, is a butterfly in the family Pieridae. It is found in Guinea-Bissau, Guinea, Sierra Leone, Liberia, Ivory Coast, Ghana, Togo, Benin and western Nigeria. The habitat consists of edges of dry forests.

== Subspecies ==
- Belenois hedyle hedyle (eastern Ghana, Togo, Benin, western Nigeria)
- Belenois hedyle ianthe (Doubleday, 1842) (Guinea-Bissau, Guinea, Sierra Leone)
- Belenois hedyle rhena (Doubleday, 1846) (Sierra Leone, Liberia, Ivory Coast, western Ghana)

Torben Larsen developed a species numbering system for his 2005 publication Butterflies of West Africa. The nominate subspecies is #76. The 'Larsen' numbers have since been used with permission in A Sharp Eye on Butterflies of Ghana.
