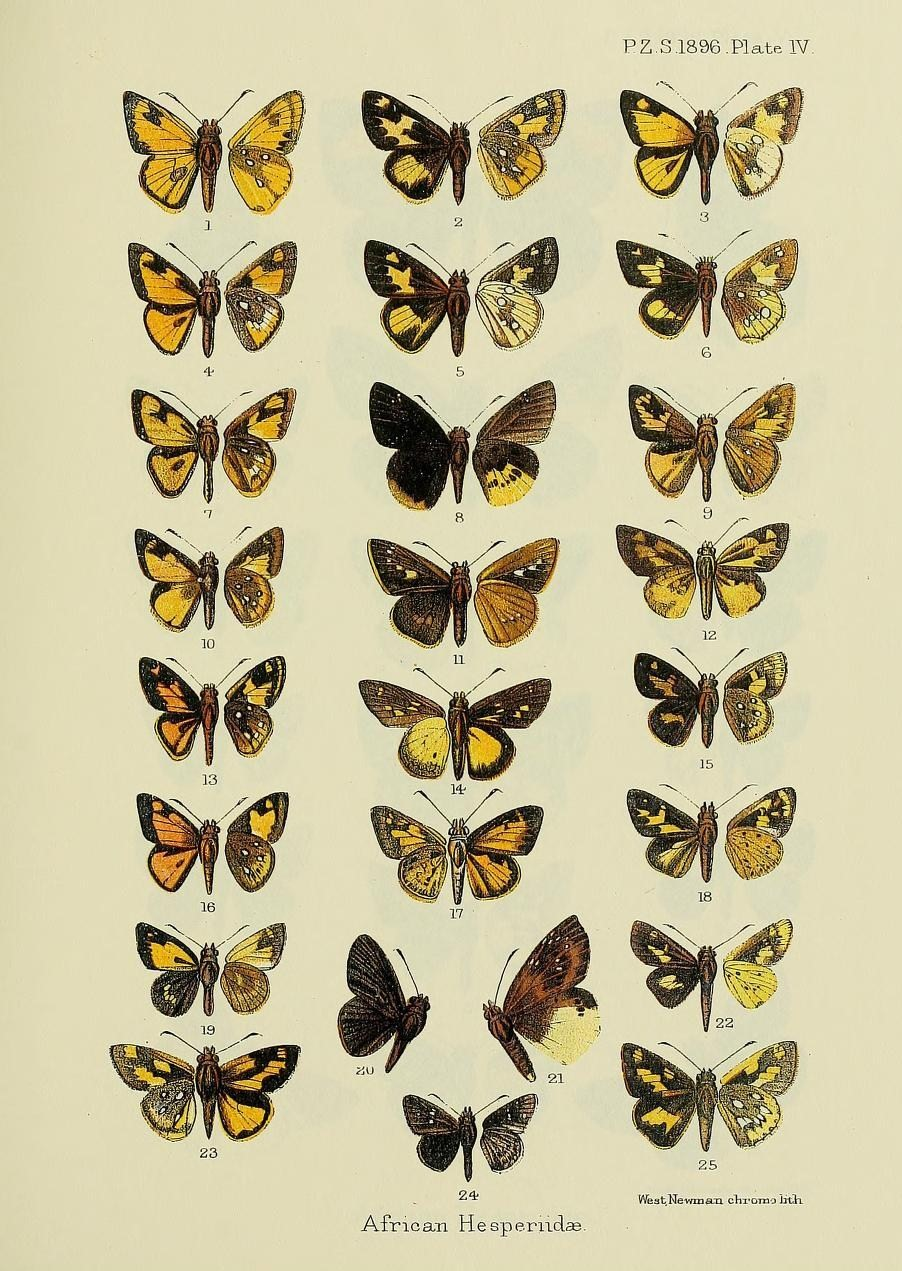
- Sarangesa brigida figure 8

Scientific classification
- Kingdom: Animalia
- Phylum: Arthropoda
- Class: Insecta
- Order: Lepidoptera
- Family: Hesperiidae
- Genus: Sarangesa
- Species: S. brigida

Binomial name
- Sarangesa brigida (Plötz, 1879)

Synonyms
- Antigonus brigida Plötz, 1879; Antigonus brigidella Plötz, 1886; Sarangesa aurimargo Holland, 1896

= Sarangesa brigida =

Species of butterfly

Sarangesa brigida, commonly known as Brigid's elfin, is a species of butterfly in the family Hesperiidae. It is found in Guinea-Bissau, Guinea, Sierra Leone, Liberia, Ivory Coast, Ghana, Nigeria, Cameroon, Gabon, the Central African Republic, the Democratic Republic of the Congo, Sudan, Uganda, Kenya, Tanzania and Zambia. The habitat consists of forest edges and clearings.

== Subspecies ==
- Sarangesa brigida brigida - Guinea-Bissau, Guinea, Sierra Leone, Liberia, Ivory Coast, Ghana, Nigeria, western Cameroon
- Sarangesa brigida atra Evans, 1937 - eastern Uganda, western Kenya, north-western Tanzania
- Sarangesa brigida sanaga Miller, 1964 - Cameroon, Gabon, Central African Republic, Democratic Republic of Congo, southern Sudan, western Uganda, north-western Zambia
