= Eresina maesseni =

Scientific classification
- Domain: Eukaryota
- Kingdom: Animalia
- Phylum: Arthropoda
- Class: Insecta
- Order: Lepidoptera
- Family: Lycaenidae
- Genus: Eresina
- Species: E. maesseni

Binomial name
- Eresina maesseni Stempffer, 1956

Species of butterfly

Eresina maesseni, the Maessen's eresina, is a butterfly in the family Lycaenidae. It is found in Senegal, Guinea-Bissau, Guinea, Sierra Leone, Ivory Coast, Ghana, southern Nigeria and Cameroon. Its habitat consists of dense, primary forests, including wet and drier forests.
