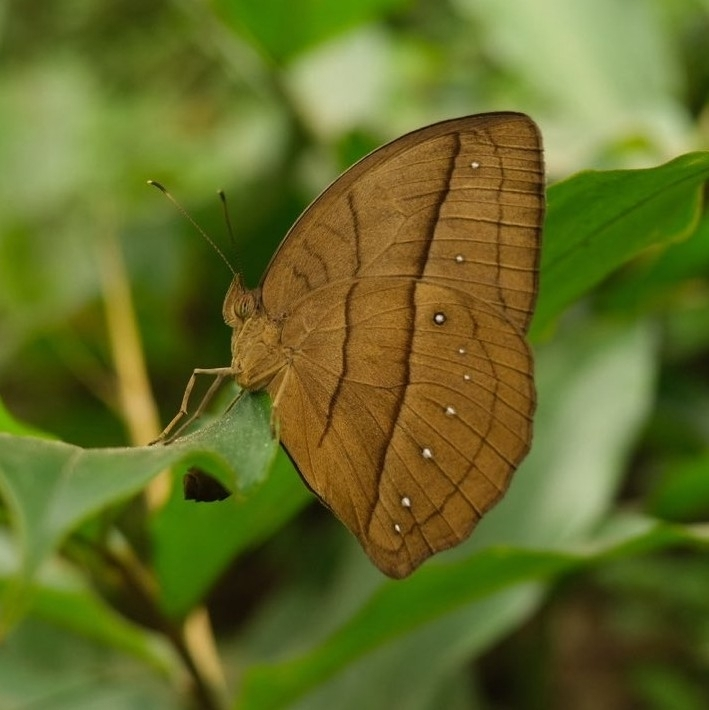

Scientific classification
- Kingdom: Animalia
- Phylum: Arthropoda
- Clade: Pancrustacea
- Class: Insecta
- Order: Lepidoptera
- Family: Nymphalidae
- Genus: Bicyclus
- Species: B. zinebi

Binomial name
- Bicyclus zinebi (Butler, 1869)

Synonyms
- Idiomorphus zinebi Butler, 1869

= Bicyclus zinebi =

Species of butterfly

Bicyclus zinebi, the western large bush brown, is a butterfly in the family Nymphalidae. It is found in Senegal, the Gambia, Guinea-Bissau, Guinea, Sierra Leone, Liberia, Ivory Coast and Ghana. The habitat consists of forests (especially drier forests).

The larvae feed on Afromomum latifolium.

Torben Larsen developed a species numbering system for his 2005 publication Butterflies of West Africa. This species is #673. The 'Larsen' numbers have since been used with permission in A Sharp Eye on Butterflies of Ghana.
