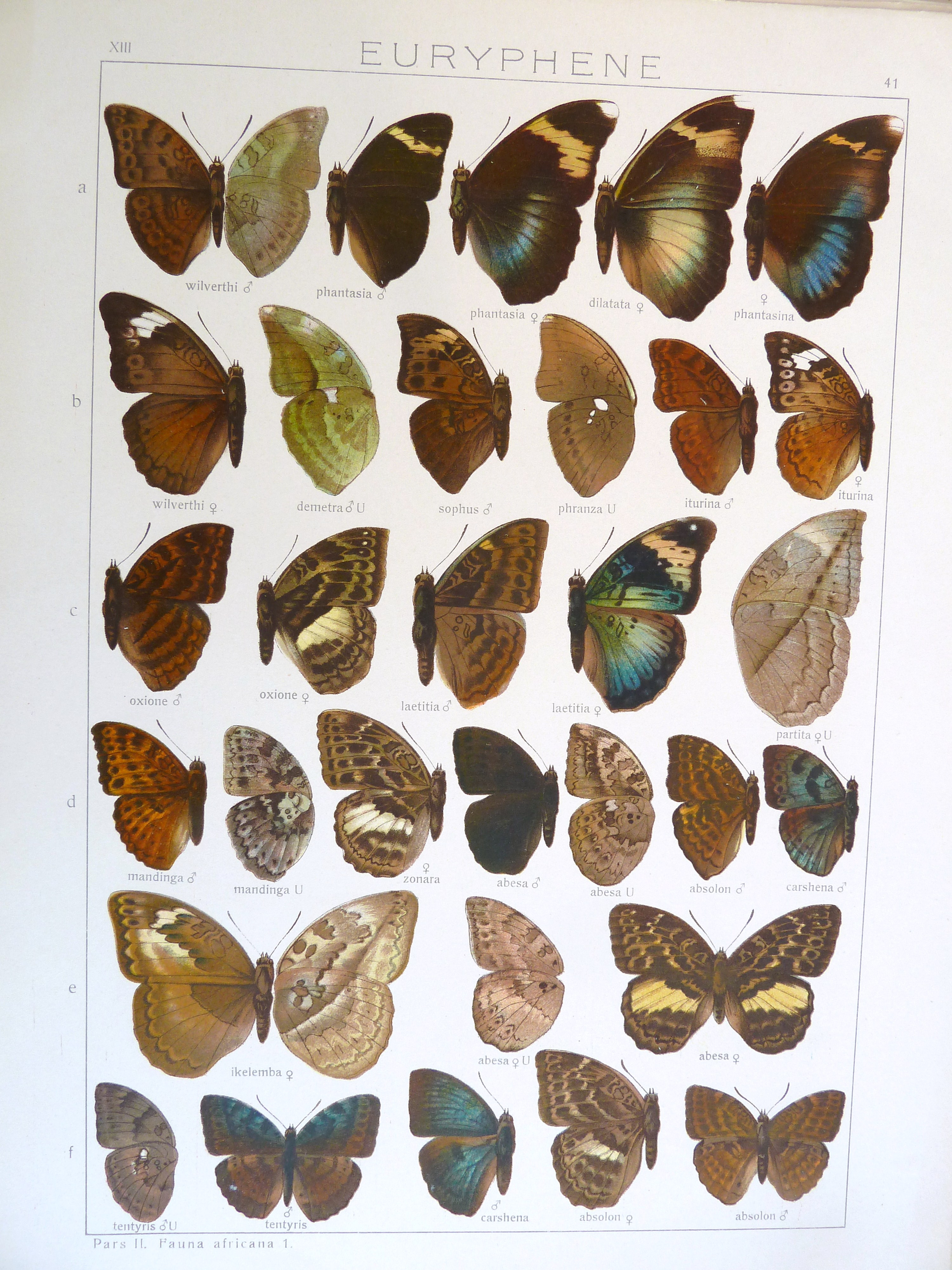
- In Adalbert Seitz's Fauna Africana
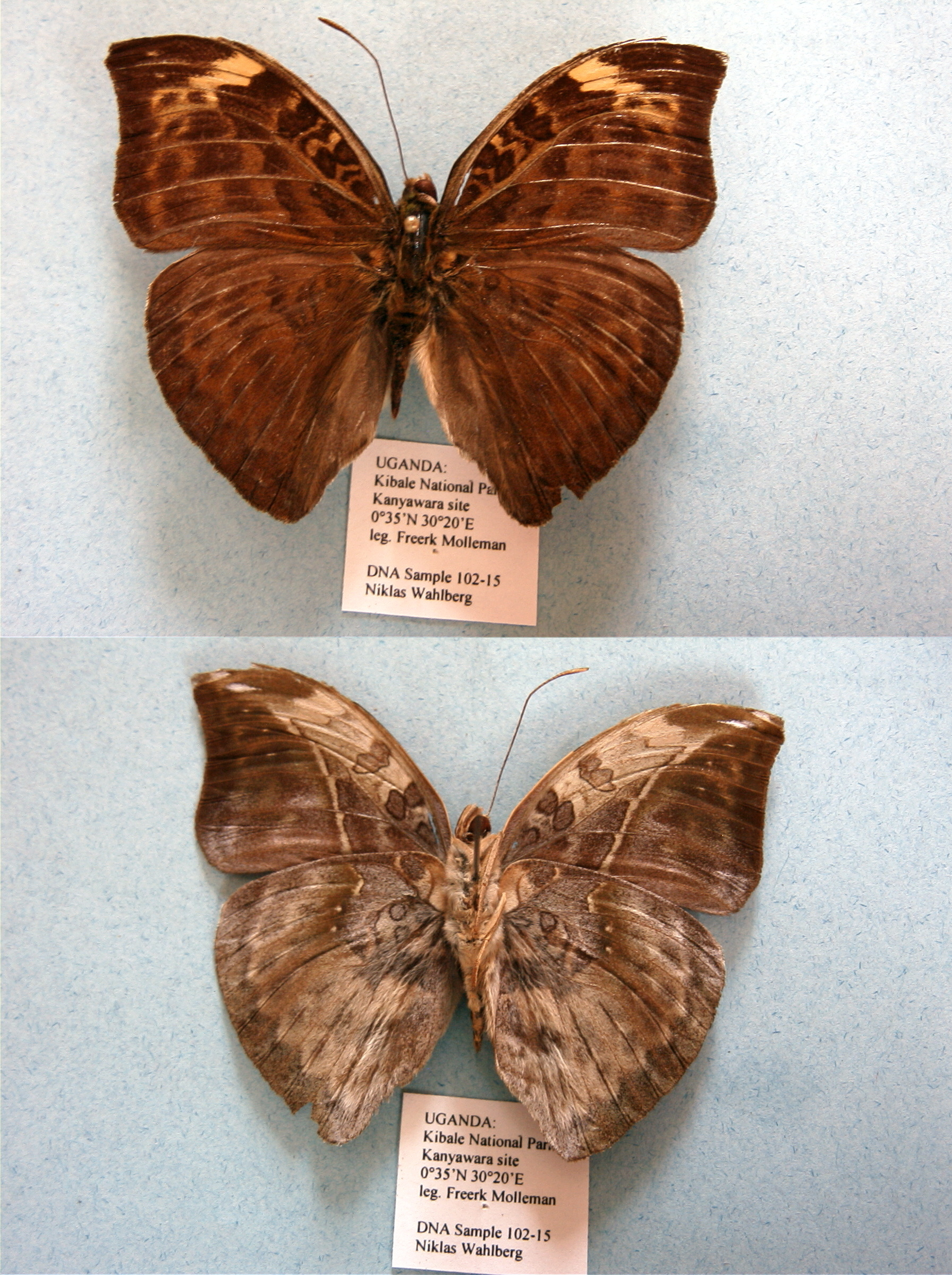

Scientific classification
- Kingdom: Animalia
- Phylum: Arthropoda
- Clade: Pancrustacea
- Class: Insecta
- Order: Lepidoptera
- Family: Nymphalidae
- Genus: Bebearia
- Species: B. sophus

Binomial name
- Bebearia sophus (Fabricius, 1793)

Synonyms
- Papilio sophus Fabricius, 1793; Bebearia (Apectinaria) sophus; Euriphene sophus aruunda Overlaet, 1955; Euriphene sophus aruunda f. albofasciata Overlaet, 1955; Euriphene sophus aruunda f. variegata Overlaet, 1955; Euryphene sophus audeoudi Riley, 1936; Euryphene sophus ochreata Carcasson, 1961; Euryphene phreone Feisthamel, 1850

= Bebearia sophus =

Species of butterfly

Bebearia sophus, the Sophus forester, is a butterfly in the family Nymphalidae. It is found in Senegal, Guinea-Bissau, Guinea, Sierra Leone, Liberia, Ivory Coast, Ghana, Togo, Benin, Nigeria, Cameroon, the Democratic Republic of the Congo, Uganda, Rwanda, Kenya, Tanzania and possibly Gabon, the Republic of the Congo, the Central African Republic and Angola. The habitat consists of low to montane forests.

E. sophus F. (41 b) is distinguished by the pointed, almost falcate forewing with the distal margin broadly emarginate. In the male the wings are very dark brown above with rather indistinct transverse bands; the forewing has between the costal margin and vein 4 or 3 a sharply defined yellow subapical band; the under surface is irregularly chequered with violet-grey and greenish brown and the costal margin of the forewing between the middle of the cell and the subapical band broadly yellow-grey; from the apex of the forewing to the middle of the hindmargin runs a whitish curved line, which at least from the hindmargin to vein 4 is distinct and dark-edged, on the hindwing it is continued as a transverse streak in cellule 7; the hindwing is broadly violet-grey at the anal angle. In the female the forewing at the base and at the hindmargin and the hindwing to the submarginal line are light greenish blue; the subapical band of the forewing is very broad, light yellow, and reaches vein 3; beneath both wings are violet-grey with the broad, proximally curved distal area of the forewing and a triangular transverse shadow on the hindwing, extending from the middle of the costal margin towards the middle of the distal margin, dark greenish brown. Sierra Leone to Angola, ab. phreone Feisth. only differs in the male in the somewhat lighter ground-colour; the female has a white subapical band on the upperside of the forewing and is lighter blue above. Senegal to Liberia and in the Congo region.

Adults are attracted to fallen fruit.

The larvae feed on Landolphia and Chrysophyllum species.

== Subspecies ==
- B. s. sophus (Guinea: Conakry, Sierra Leone, Liberia, Ivory Coast, Ghana, Togo, Benin, Nigeria, Cameroon, Gabon, Congo, Central African Republic, Angola, Democratic Republic of the Congo)
- B. s. aruunda (Overlaet, 1955) (Democratic Republic of the Congo: Mayumbe, Ubangi, Mongala, Uele, north Kivu, Tshopo, Equateur, Cataractes, Kwilu, Kasai, Sankuru, Lomami, Lualaba and Tanganika)
- B. s. audeoudi (Riley, 1936) (Uganda, western Kenya, north-western Tanzania)
- B. s. monforti Hecq, 1990 (Rwanda)
- B. s. ochreata (Carcasson, 1961) (western Tanzania)
- B. s. phreone (Feisthamel, 1850) (Senegal, Guinea-Bissau, Guinea)

Torben Larsen developed a species numbering system for his 2005 publication Butterflies of West Africa. The nominate subspecies is #1014. The 'Larsen' numbers have since been used with permission in A Sharp Eye on Butterflies of Ghana.
