= Anthene liodes =

Liodes hairtail

Scientific classification
- Kingdom: Animalia
- Phylum: Arthropoda
- Clade: Pancrustacea
- Class: Insecta
- Order: Lepidoptera
- Family: Lycaenidae
- Genus: Anthene
- Species: A. liodes

Binomial name
- Anthene liodes (Hewitson, 1874)

Synonyms
- Lycaenesthes bihe Bethune-Baker, 1910; Lycaena adherbal Mabille, 1877; Lycaenesthes monteironis Kirby, 1878

Species of butterfly

Anthene liodes, the liodes hairtail, is a butterfly of the family Lycaenidae. It is found from Sierra Leone to Kenya, then to Malawi, Zimbabwe and Angola. It is rarely found in South Africa found from KwaZulu-Natal to Eswatini, Mpumalanga and the Limpopo Province. Its habitat is usually woodlands, forest-edge habitats and dense savannah.

The wingspan is 21–25 mm for males and 21–27 mm for females. Adults are on wing year-round, with a peak in summer.

The larvae feed on Mangifera (including M. indica), Combretum, Myrica and Allophylus species

== Subspecies ==
- Anthene liodes liodes Hewitson, 1874
- Anthene liodes monteironis Libert, 2010

Torben Larsen developed a species numbering system for his 2005 publication Butterflies of West Africa. The species (without subspecies identification) is #512. The 'Larsen' numbers have since been used with permission in A Sharp Eye on Butterflies of Ghana.
