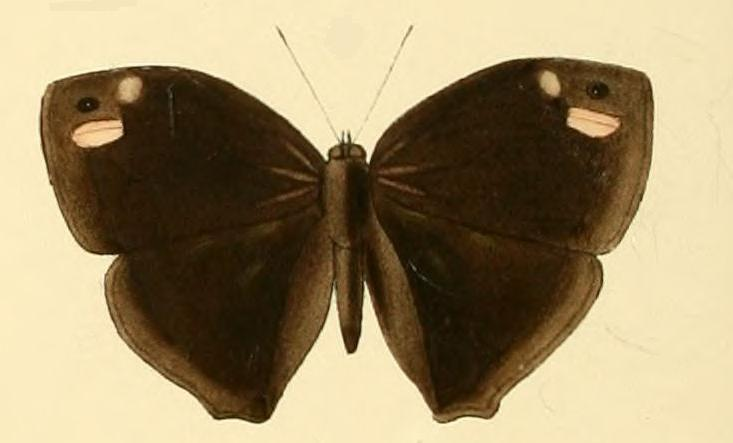

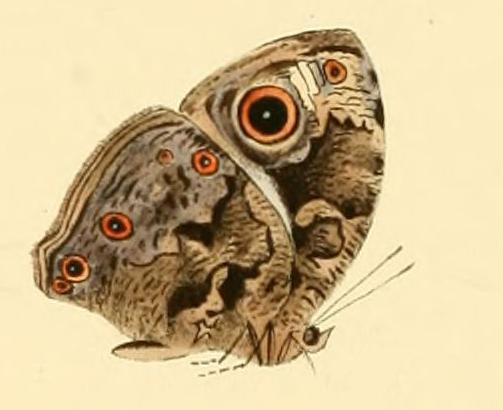

Scientific classification
- Kingdom: Animalia
- Phylum: Arthropoda
- Clade: Pancrustacea
- Class: Insecta
- Order: Lepidoptera
- Family: Nymphalidae
- Genus: Bicyclus
- Species: B. mandanes

Binomial name
- Bicyclus mandanes Hewitson, 1873

Synonyms
- Dichothyris graphidhabra Karsch, 1893

= Bicyclus mandanes =

Large marbled bush brown

Species of butterfly

Bicyclus mandanes, the large marbled bush brown, is a butterfly in the family Nymphalidae. It is found in Senegal, Guinea-Bissau, Guinea, Sierra Leone, Liberia, Ivory Coast, Ghana, Togo, southern Nigeria, Cameroon, Gabon, the Republic of the Congo, the Central African Republic, Angola, the Democratic Republic of the Congo, Uganda, western Kenya, western Tanzania and Zambia. The habitat consists of wet and dry forests.

Adults feed on fallen fruit and carnivore scats.

Torben Larsen developed a species numbering system for his 2005 publication Butterflies of West Africa. This species is #695. The 'Larsen' numbers have since been used with permission in A Sharp Eye on Butterflies of Ghana.
