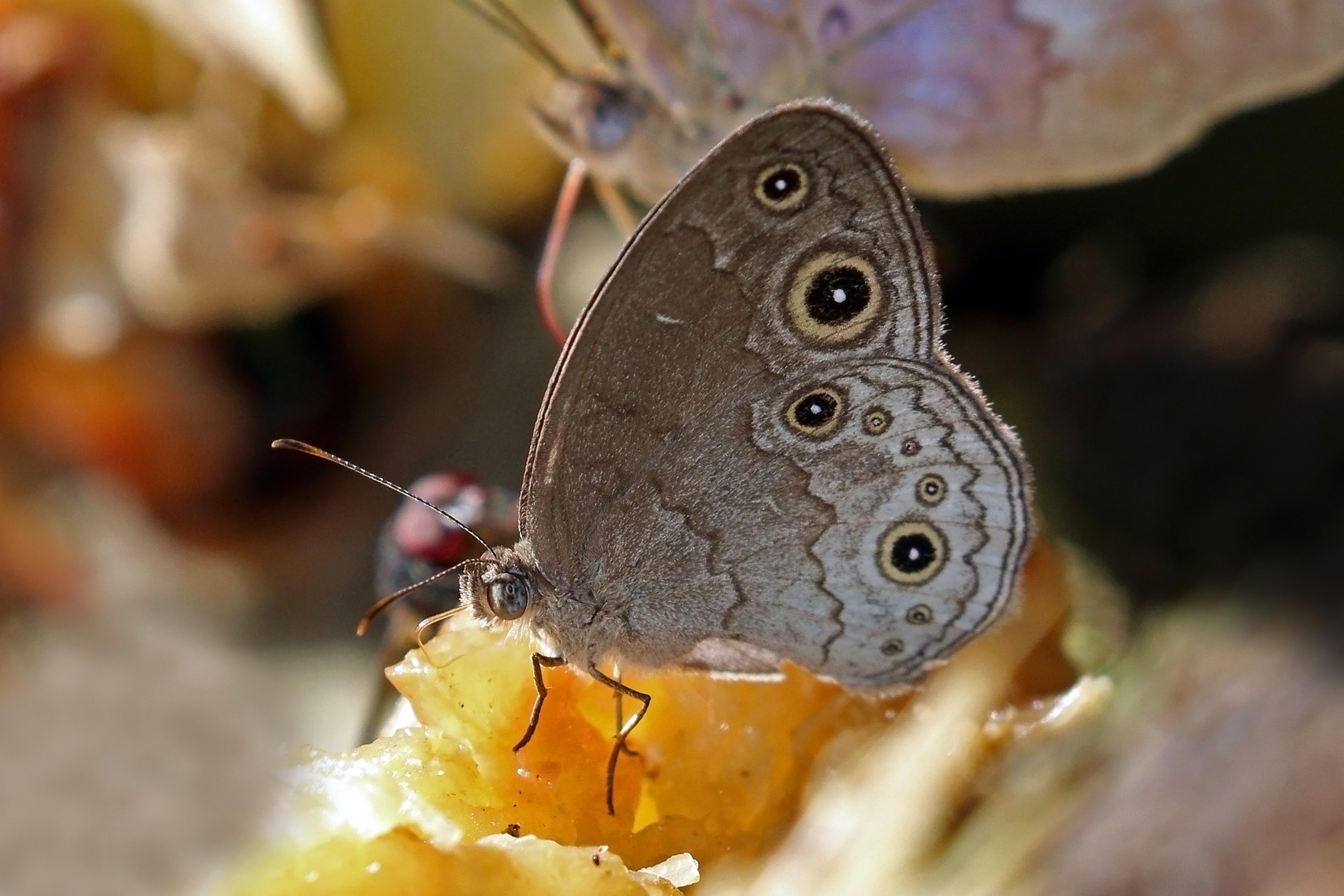
- Male
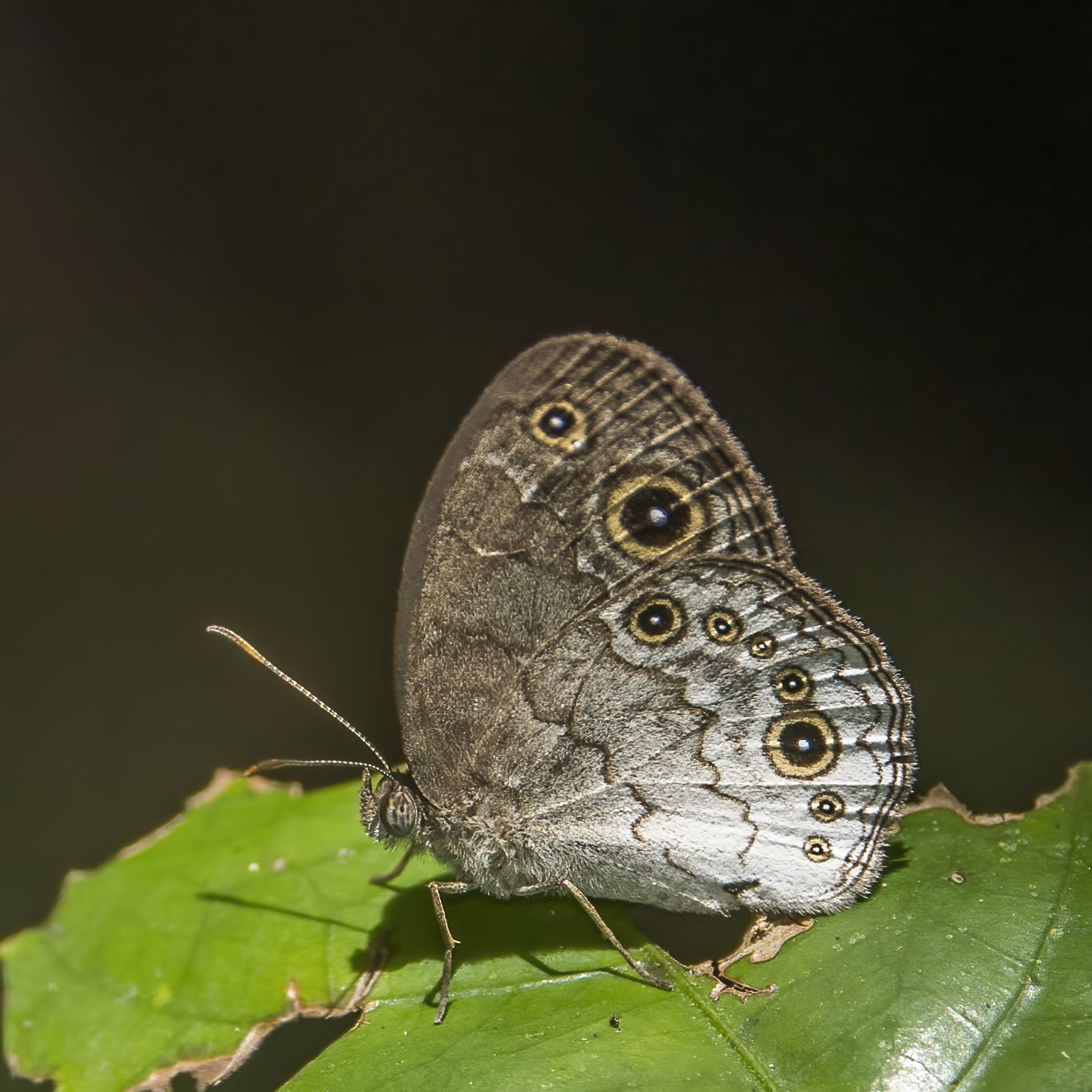
- Female

Scientific classification
- Kingdom: Animalia
- Phylum: Arthropoda
- Clade: Pancrustacea
- Class: Insecta
- Order: Lepidoptera
- Family: Nymphalidae
- Genus: Bicyclus
- Species: B. taenias

Binomial name
- Bicyclus taenias (Hewitson, 1877)

Synonyms
- Mycalesis taenias Hewitson, 1877; Mycalesis gerda Plötz, 1880; Bicyclus taenias f. pujoli Condamin, 1961

= Bicyclus taenias =

Species of butterfly

Bicyclus taenias, the grey bush brown, is a butterfly in the family Nymphalidae. It is found in Senegal, Guinea-Bissau, Guinea, Sierra Leone, Liberia, Ivory Coast, Ghana, Togo, Nigeria, Cameroon, Gabon, the Central African Republic and the Democratic Republic of the Congo. The habitat consists of dense forests.

Torben Larsen developed a species numbering system for his 2005 publication Butterflies of West Africa. This species is #687. The 'Larsen' numbers have since been used with permission in A Sharp Eye on Butterflies of Ghana.
