= Euriphene gambiae =

- both male Kakum National Park, Ghana

Scientific classification
- Kingdom: Animalia
- Phylum: Arthropoda
- Clade: Pancrustacea
- Class: Insecta
- Order: Lepidoptera
- Family: Nymphalidae
- Genus: Euriphene
- Species: E. gambiae

Binomial name
- Euriphene gambiae Feisthamel, 1850

Synonyms
- Euryphena gambiae Feisthamel, 1850; Euriphene (Euriphene) gambiae; Diestogina gambiae f. deformata Neustetter, 1916

Species of butterfly

Euriphene gambiae, the Gambia nymph, is a butterfly in the family Nymphalidae. It is found in Senegal, Guinea-Bissau, Guinea, Sierra Leone, Liberia, Ivory Coast, Ghana, Nigeria, Cameroon, Gabon, the Republic of the Congo, Angola and the Democratic Republic of the Congo. The habitat consists of forests.

== Subspecies ==
- Euriphene gambiae gambiae (Senegal, Guinea-Bissau, Guinea to Ghana)
- Euriphene gambiae gabonica Bernardi, 1966 (southern Nigeria, Cameroon, Gabon, Congo, Angola, Democratic Republic of the Congo: Mayumbe, Uele, northern Kivu, Tshopo, Equateur, Cataractes, Sankuru)

Torben Larsen developed a species numbering system for his 2005 publication Butterflies of West Africa. This species, then described as E. g. vera is #986. The 'Larsen' numbers have since been used with permission in A Sharp Eye on Butterflies of Ghana.
