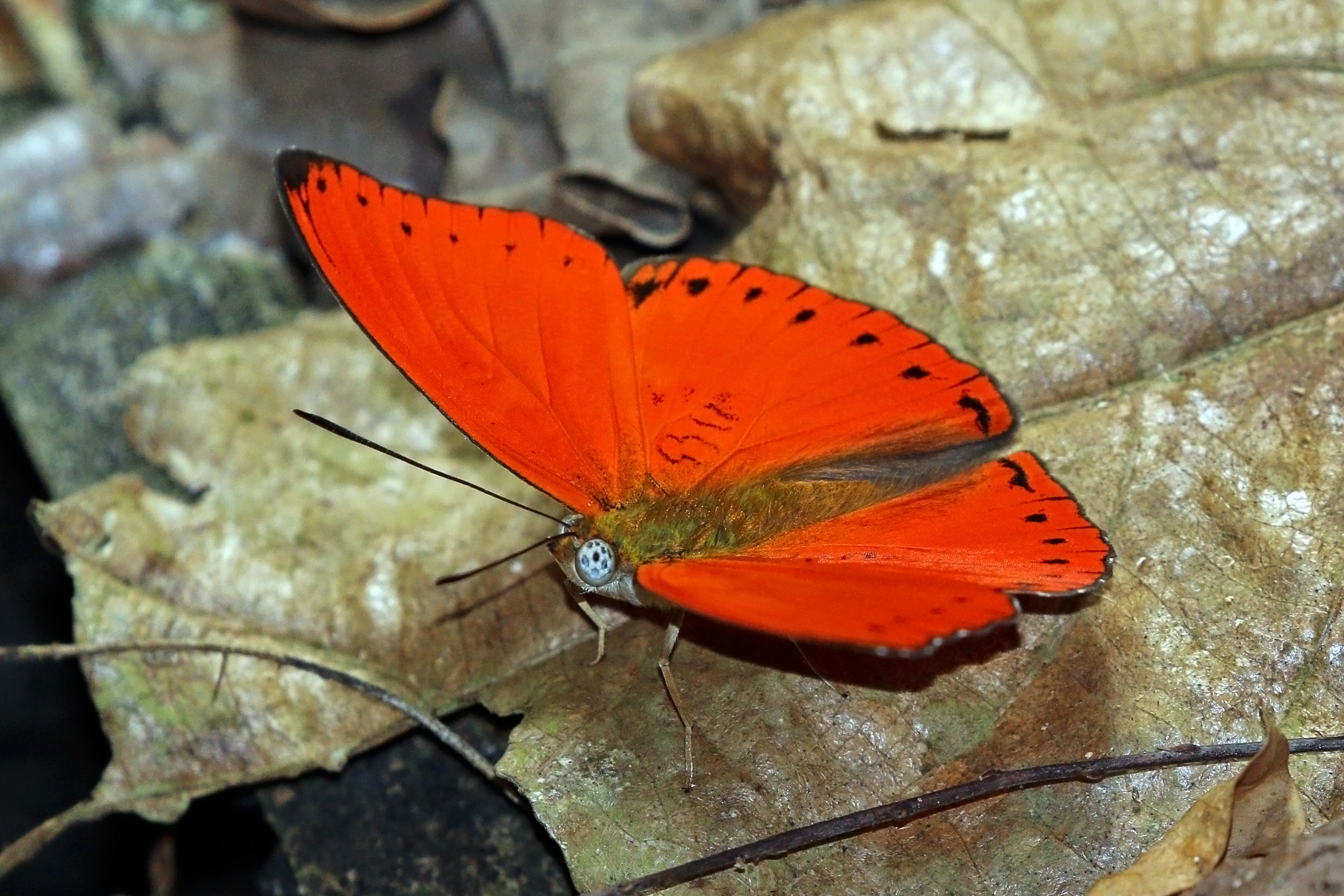

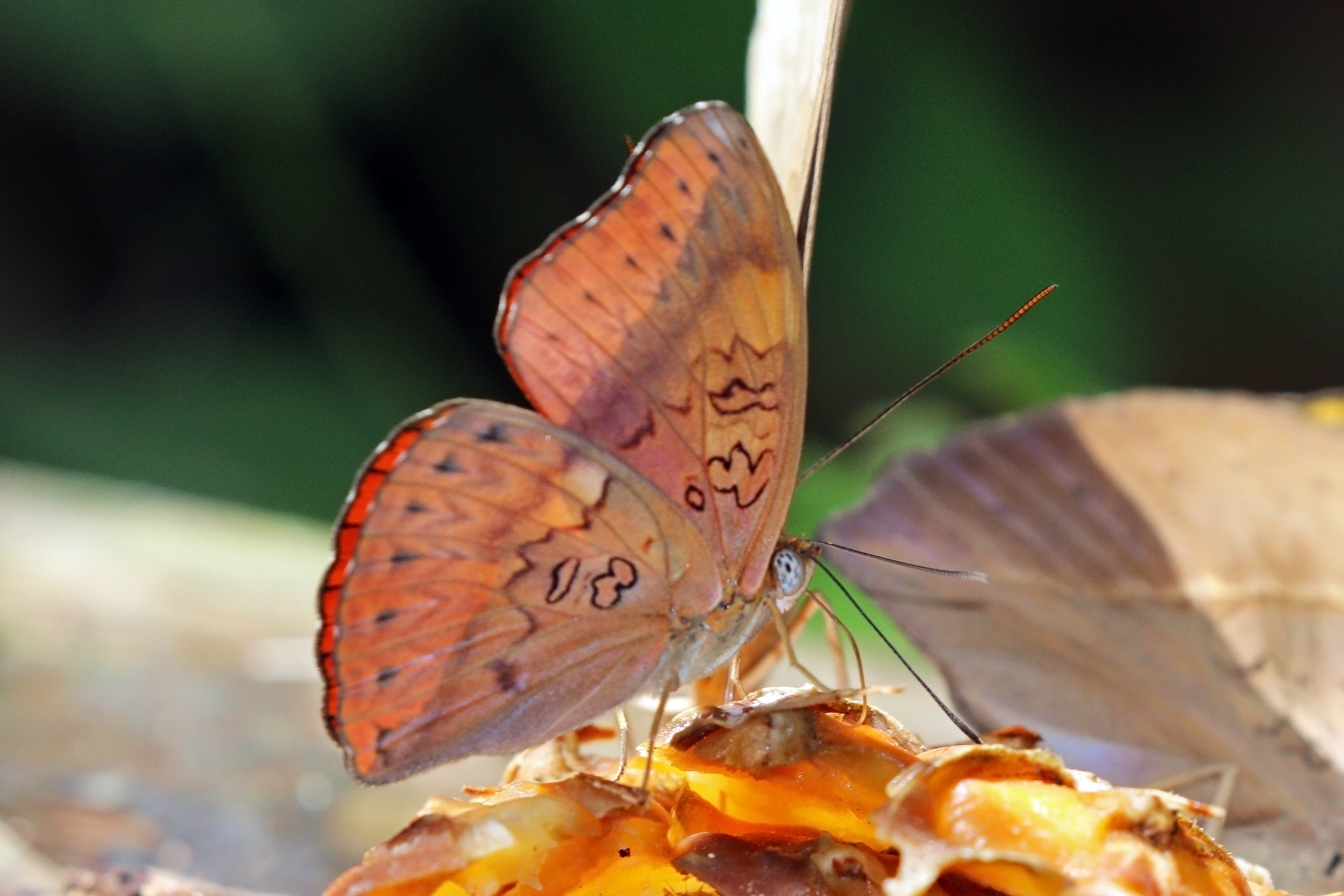
- both in Kakum National Park, Ghana

Scientific classification
- Kingdom: Animalia
- Phylum: Arthropoda
- Clade: Pancrustacea
- Class: Insecta
- Order: Lepidoptera
- Family: Nymphalidae
- Genus: Cymothoe
- Species: C. mabillei

Binomial name
- Cymothoe mabillei Overlaet, 1944

Synonyms
- Cymothoe aralus Mabille, 1890; Cymothoe anitorgis ab. leonis Aurivillius, 1912; Cymothoe mabillei f. testui Overlaet, 1944

= Cymothoe mabillei =

Species of butterfly

Cymothoe mabillei, the western red glider, is a butterfly in the family Nymphalidae. It is found in Guinea-Bissau, Guinea, Sierra Leone, Liberia, Ivory Coast and Ghana (west of the Volta River). The habitat consists of forests.

Torben Larsen developed a species numbering system for his 2005 publication Butterflies of West Africa. This species is #873. The 'Larsen' numbers have since been used with permission in A Sharp Eye on Butterflies of Ghana.
