= Hypolycaena anara =

Scientific classification
- Kingdom: Animalia
- Phylum: Arthropoda
- Clade: Pancrustacea
- Class: Insecta
- Order: Lepidoptera
- Family: Lycaenidae
- Genus: Hypolycaena
- Species: H. anara

Binomial name
- Hypolycaena anara Larsen, 1986

Synonyms
- Hypolycaena hatita anara Larsen, 1986

Species of butterfly

Hypolycaena anara, the savanna fairy hairstreak, is a butterfly in the family Lycaenidae. It is found in Guinea-Bissau, Guinea, southern Burkina Faso, northern Ivory Coast and north-eastern Nigeria. The habitat consists of dense savanna and dry forests in hilly country.
