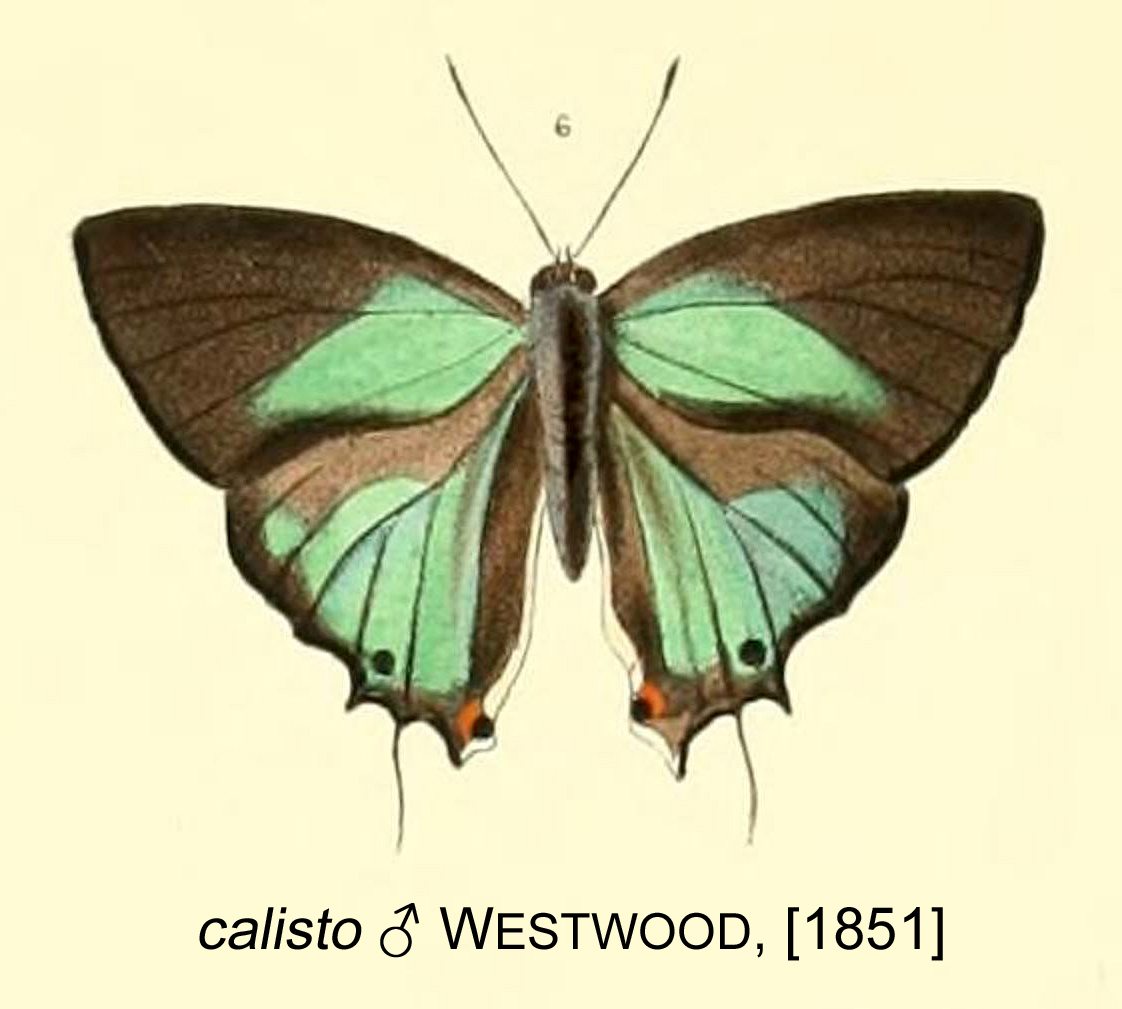

Scientific classification
- Kingdom: Animalia
- Phylum: Arthropoda
- Clade: Pancrustacea
- Class: Insecta
- Order: Lepidoptera
- Family: Lycaenidae
- Genus: Iolaus
- Species: I. calisto

Binomial name
- Iolaus calisto (Westwood, 1851)

Synonyms
- Anthene calisto Westwood, 1851; Iolaus (Philiolaus) calisto

= Iolaus calisto =

Species of butterfly

Iolaus calisto, the large green sapphire, is a butterfly in the family Lycaenidae. It is found in Senegal, Gambia, Guinea-Bissau, Guinea, southern Burkina Faso, Sierra Leone, Ivory Coast, Ghana, Togo, Nigeria (south and the Cross River loop), Cameroon, Gabon and the Central African Republic. The habitat consists of forests.

Torben Larsen developed a species numbering system for his 2005 publication Butterflies of West Africa. This species is #407. The 'Larsen' numbers have since been used with permission in A Sharp Eye on Butterflies of Ghana.
