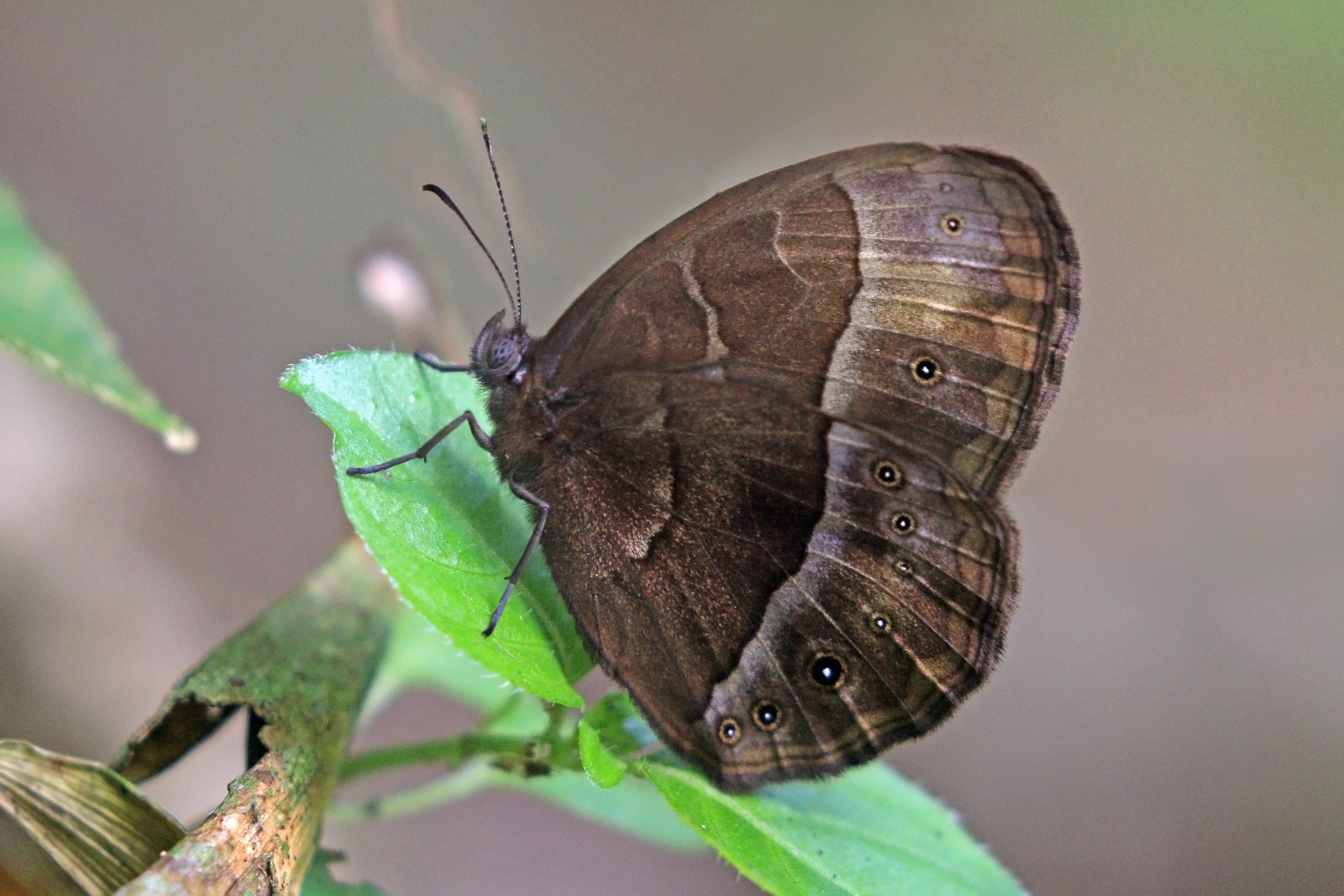
- In Kakamega Forest, Kenya

Scientific classification
- Kingdom: Animalia
- Phylum: Arthropoda
- Clade: Pancrustacea
- Class: Insecta
- Order: Lepidoptera
- Family: Nymphalidae
- Genus: Bicyclus
- Species: B. funebris

Binomial name
- Bicyclus funebris (Guérin-Méneville, 1844)

Synonyms
- Satyris funebris Guérin-Méneville, 1844; Mycalesis nebulosa Felder and Felder, 1867; Mycalesis saga Butler, 1868; Mycalesis agraphis Karsch, 1893; Mycalesis rhanidostroma Karsch, 1893; Mycalesis (Monotrichtis) funebris f. agraphides Strand, 1912

= Bicyclus funebris =

Species of butterfly

Bicyclus funebris, the funereal bush brown, is a butterfly in the family Nymphalidae. It is found in Senegal, the Gambia, Guinea-Bissau, Guinea, Sierra Leone, Liberia, Ivory Coast, Ghana, Togo, Benin, Nigeria, Cameroon, Gabon, the Republic of the Congo, Angola, the Central African Republic, the Democratic Republic of the Congo, Uganda, western Kenya, western Tanzania and northern Zambia. The habitat consists of drier forests, but extends to wet forests and dense savanna. It is also found in heavy woodland.

The larvae feed on Setaria barbata, Digitaria seminuda and Imperata cylindrica.

Torben Larsen developed a species numbering system for his 2005 publication Butterflies of West Africa. This species is #702. The 'Larsen' numbers have since been used with permission in A Sharp Eye on Butterflies of Ghana.
