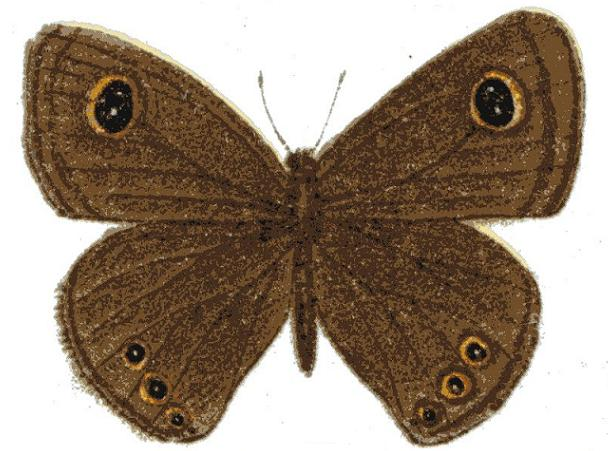

Scientific classification
- Kingdom: Animalia
- Phylum: Arthropoda
- Clade: Pancrustacea
- Class: Insecta
- Order: Lepidoptera
- Family: Nymphalidae
- Tribe: Satyrini
- Genus: Ypthimomorpha van Son, 1955
- Species: Y. itonia

Binomial name
- Ypthimomorpha itonia (Hewitson, 1865)

Synonyms
- Ypthima itonia Hewitson, 1865; Yphthima hoehneli Holland, 1896; Ypthima hoehneli; Ypthima itonia ab. microocellata Strand, 1909; Ypthima itonia ab. quadriocellata Strand, 1909; Ypthima itonia ab. pluripupillata Strand, 1909; Ypthima itonia ab. subocellata Strand, 1909; Ypthima itonia ab. pluriocellata Strand, 1913

= Ypthimomorpha =

Genus of butterflies

Ypthimomorpha is a monotypic butterfly genus from the subfamily Satyrinae in the family Nymphalidae. It contains only one species, Ypthimomorpha itonia, the marsh ringlet or swamp ringlet, which is found in Senegal, the Gambia, Guinea-Bissau, Guinea, Sierra Leone, Liberia, Ivory Coast, Burkina Faso, Ghana, Togo, Benin, Nigeria, Sudan, Ethiopia, Kenya, Tanzania, Zambia, northern and eastern Zimbabwe, western Mozambique and Botswana. The habitat consists of open, moist areas and marshes on forest margins.

Adults are on wing year round.

The larvae feed on Poaceae species.

Torben Larsen developed a species numbering system for his 2005 publication Butterflies of West Africa. This species is #724. The 'Larsen' numbers have since been used with permission in A Sharp Eye on Butterflies of Ghana.
