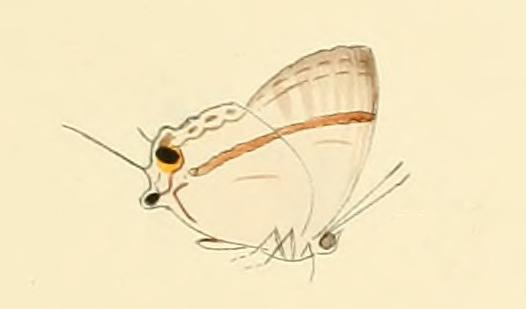

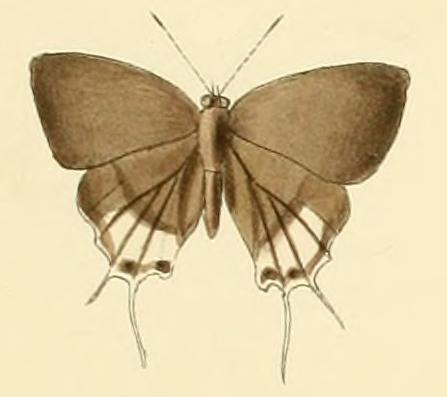

Scientific classification
- Kingdom: Animalia
- Phylum: Arthropoda
- Clade: Pancrustacea
- Class: Insecta
- Order: Lepidoptera
- Family: Lycaenidae
- Genus: Paradeudorix
- Species: P. eleala

Binomial name
- Paradeudorix eleala (Hewitson, 1865)

Synonyms
- Hypolycaena eleala Hewitson, 1865; Hypokopelates obscura Bethune-Baker, 1914; Deudorix (Hypokopelates) viridis Stempffer, 1964; Hypokopelates eleala parallela Collins & Larsen, 2000; Hypokopelates eleala cufadana Mendes & De Sousa, 2003

= Paradeudorix eleala =

Species of butterfly

Paradeudorix eleala, the western fairy playboy, is a butterfly in the family Lycaenidae. It is found in Guinea-Bissau, Guinea, Sierra Leone, Liberia, Ivory Coast, Ghana, Togo, Benin, Nigeria, Cameroon, Equatorial Guinea and the Democratic Republic of the Congo. The habitat consists of primary forests.

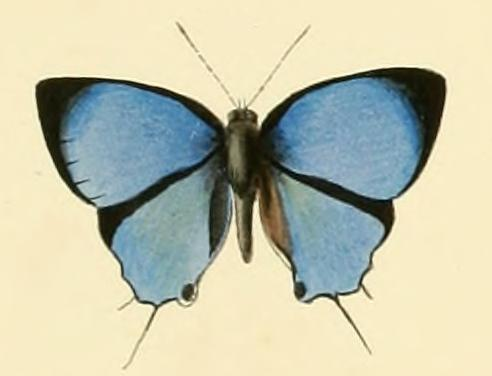

The larvae feed on Albizia zygia and Theobroma cacao. They are attended by the ant species Crematogaster buchneri.

== Subspecies ==
- Paradeudorix eleala eleala (eastern Nigeria, Cameroon, Bioko, Democratic Republic of the Congo: Mongala, Equateur, Kinshasa and Lualaba)
- Paradeudorix eleala cufadana (Mendes & De Sousa, 2003) (Guinea-Bissau)
- Paradeudorix eleala parallela (Collins & Larsen, 2000) (Guinea Bissau, Guinea)
- Paradeudorix eleala viridis (Stempffer, 1964) (coast of Guinea, Sierra Leone, Liberia, Ivory Coast, Ghana, Togo, Benin, western Nigeria)

Torben Larsen developed a species numbering system for his 2005 publication Butterflies of West Africa. The subspecies viridis is #484. The 'Larsen' numbers have since been used with permission in A Sharp Eye on Butterflies of Ghana.

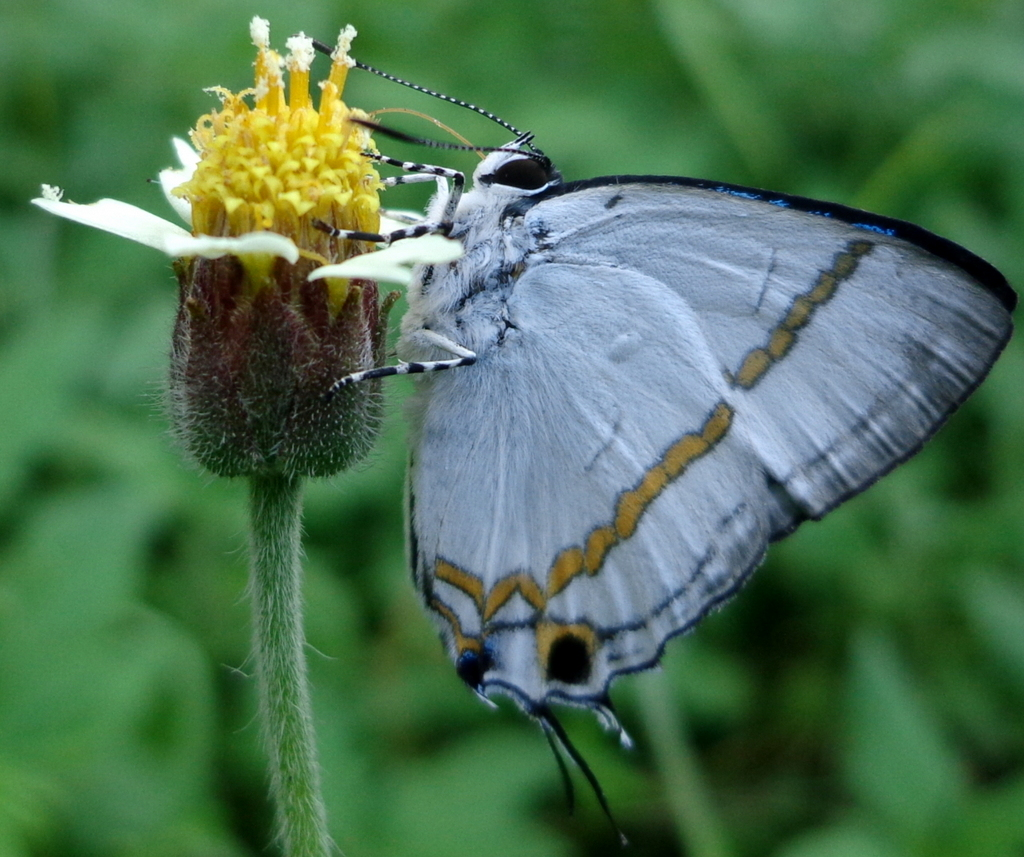
Feeding off flower of weed plant Tridax procumbens in Lagos, Nigeria

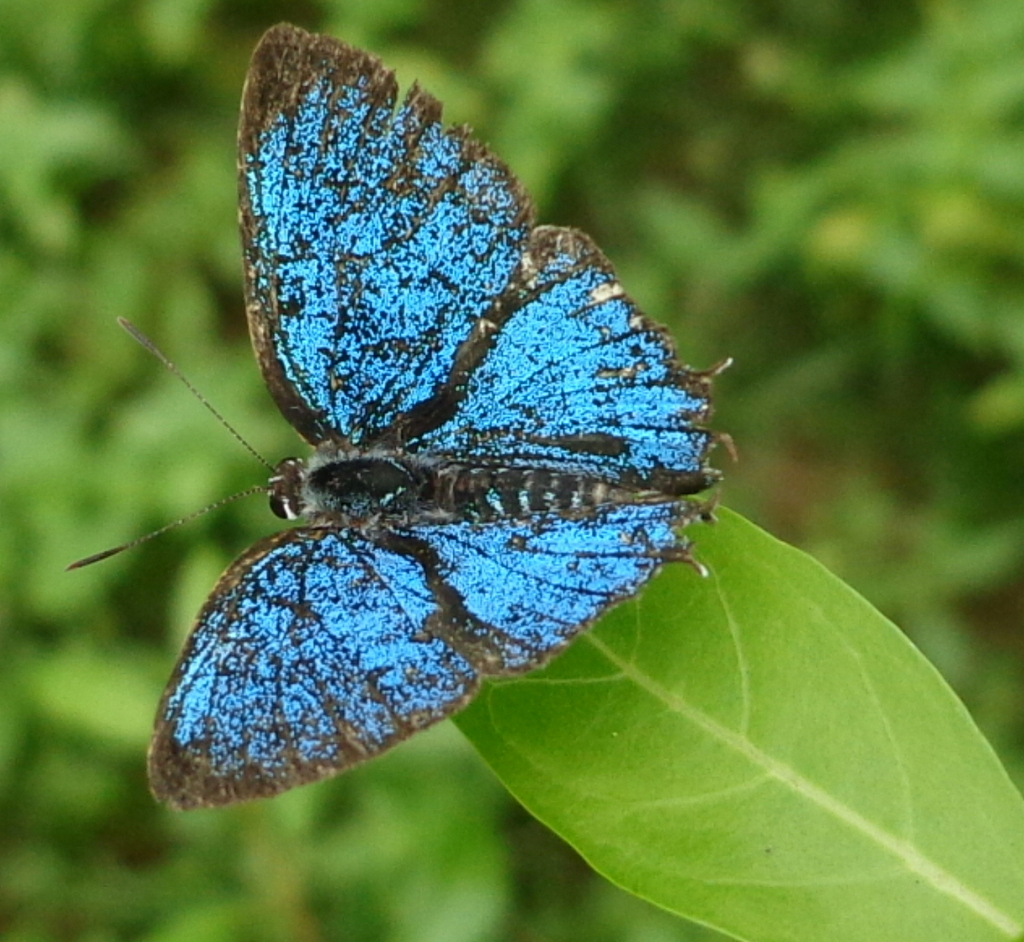
With exposed wings, Lagos

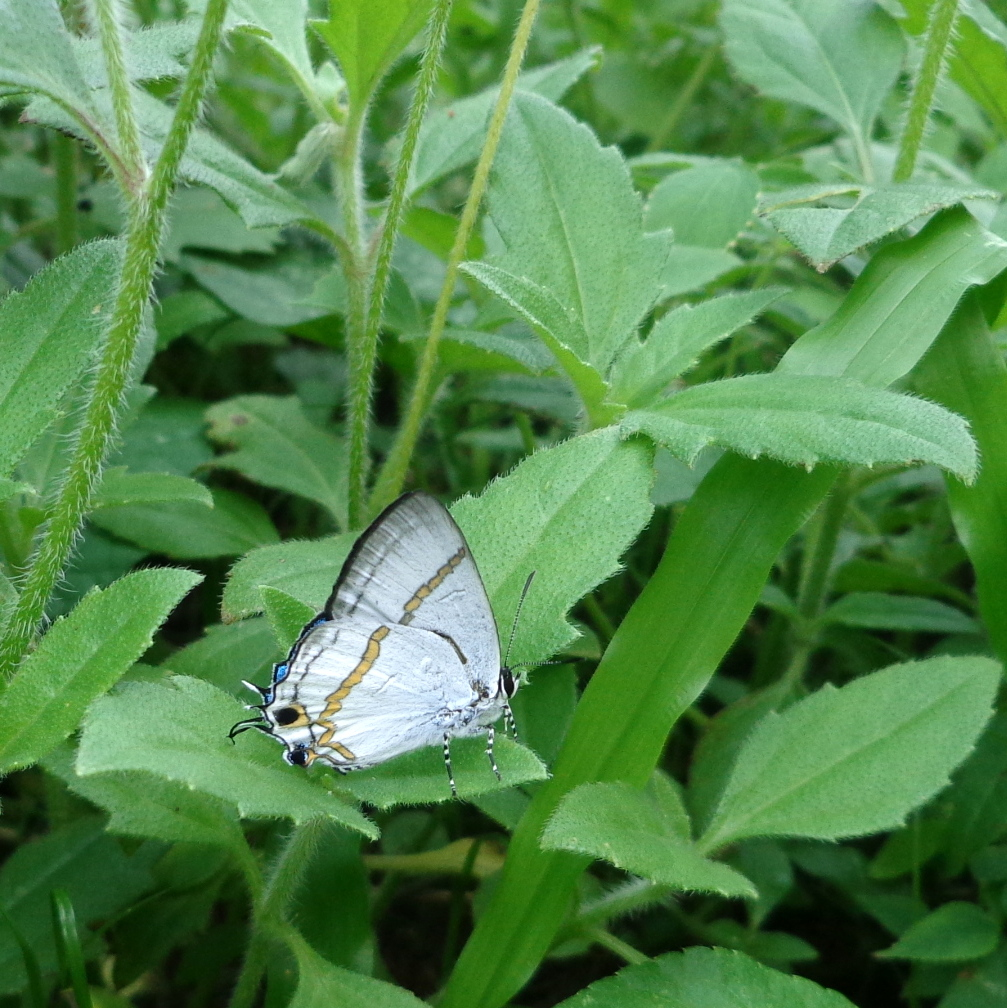
At rest, Lagos
