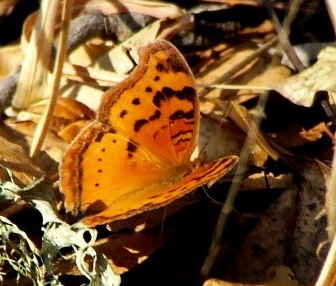

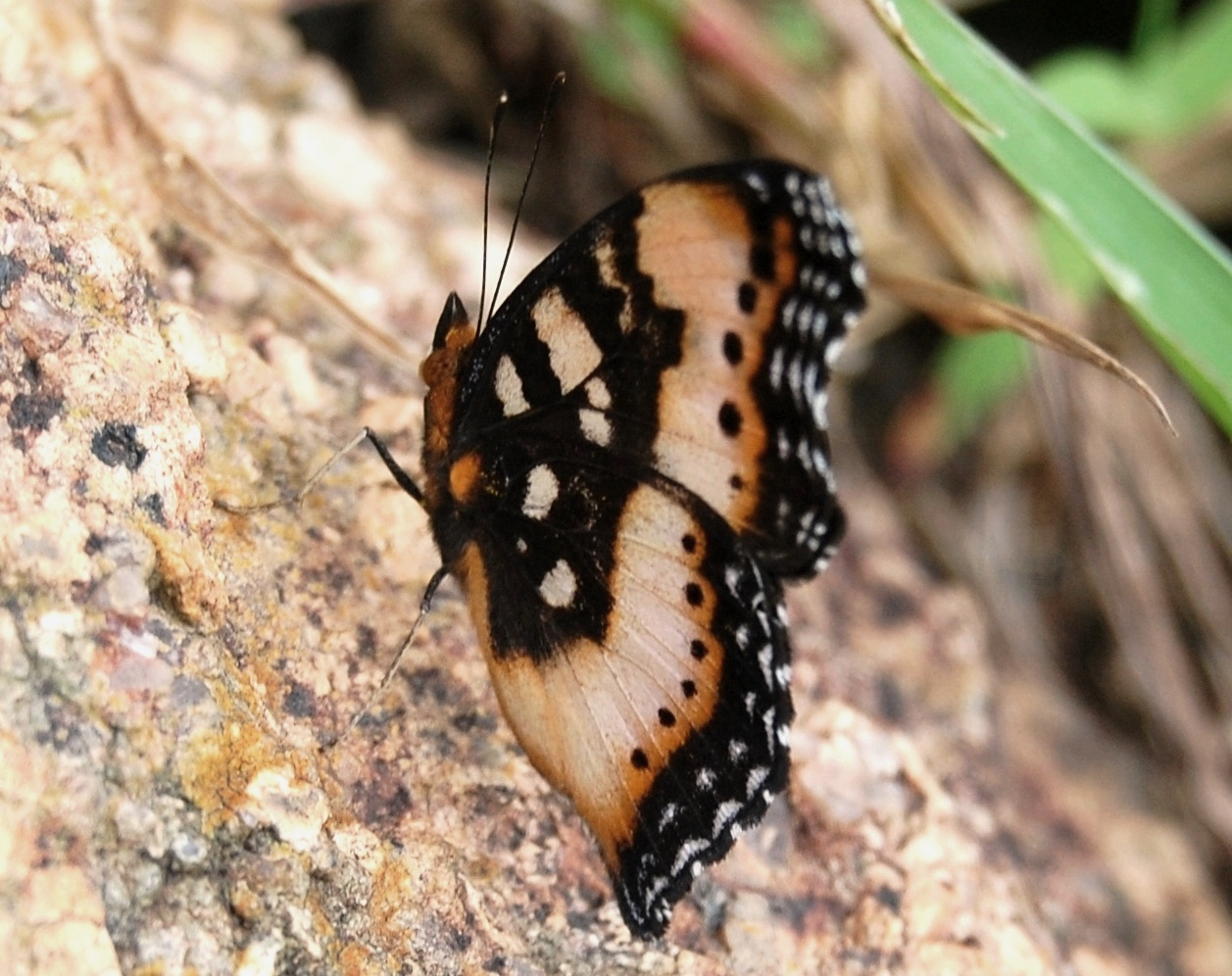
- The dry-season form (f. antilope) in Zimbabwe and Nigeria respectively

Scientific classification
- Kingdom: Animalia
- Phylum: Arthropoda
- Clade: Pancrustacea
- Class: Insecta
- Order: Lepidoptera
- Family: Nymphalidae
- Genus: Precis
- Species: P. antilope

Binomial name
- Precis antilope (Feisthamel, 1850)

Synonyms
- Papilio ibiris C. & R. Felder, [1867]; Salamis antilope Feisthamel, 1850; Precis simia Wallengren, 1857; Junonia micromera Butler, 1876; Precis petersi Dewitz, 1879

= Precis antilope =

Darker commodore

Species of butterfly

Precis antilope, the darker commodore, is a species of butterfly in the family Nymphalidae, found in the dry season and is native to Subsaharan Africa.

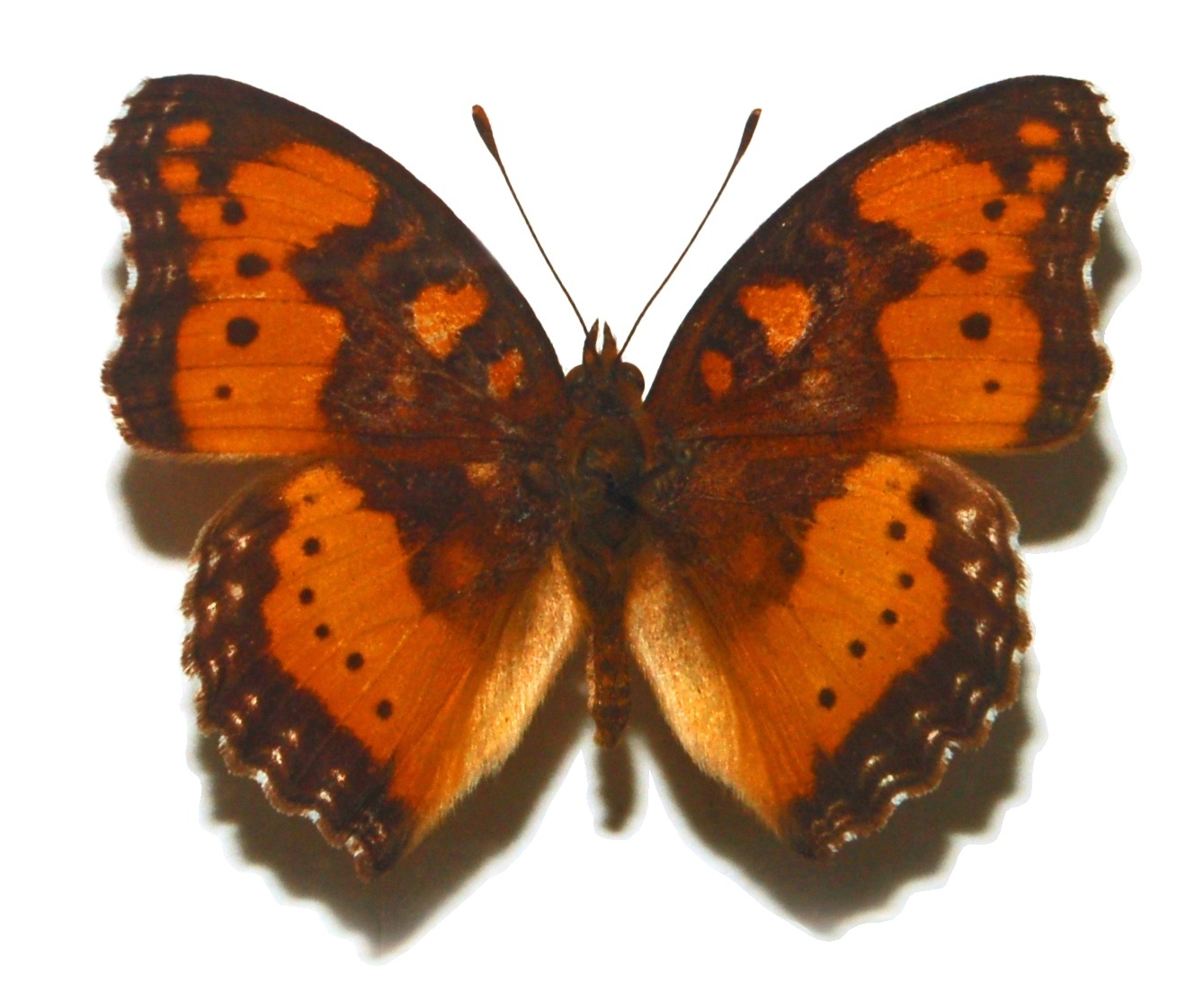
The wet-season form (f. simia) from Eritrea

The wingspan is 40–55 mm in males and 50–60 mm in females.

The flight period is from December to March.

The larvae feed on Coleus and Plastostema species.

Torben Larsen developed a species numbering system for his 2005 publication Butterflies of West Africa. This species is #793. The 'Larsen' numbers have since been used with permission in A Sharp Eye on Butterflies of Ghana.
