= Euphaedra villiersi =

Scientific classification
- Kingdom: Animalia
- Phylum: Arthropoda
- Clade: Pancrustacea
- Class: Insecta
- Order: Lepidoptera
- Family: Nymphalidae
- Genus: Euphaedra
- Species: E. villiersi

Binomial name
- Euphaedra villiersi Condamin, 1964

Synonyms
- Euphaedra (Euphaedrana) villiersi

Species of butterfly

Euphaedra villiersi, or Villiers' Ceres forester, is a butterfly in the family Nymphalidae. It is found in Senegal, Guinea-Bissau, Guinea and Sierra Leone. The habitat consists of forests.
