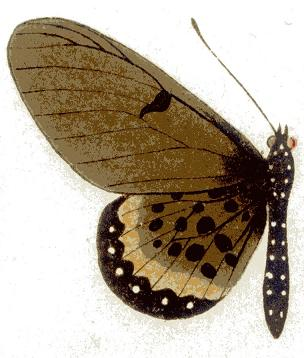

Scientific classification
- Kingdom: Animalia
- Phylum: Arthropoda
- Clade: Pancrustacea
- Class: Insecta
- Order: Lepidoptera
- Family: Nymphalidae
- Genus: Acraea
- Species: A. camaena

Binomial name
- Acraea camaena (Drury, 1773)

Synonyms
- Papilio camaena Drury, 1773; Acraea (Acraea) camaena; Papilio murcia Fabricius, 1781

= Acraea camaena =

Large smoky acraea

Species of butterfly

Acraea camaena, the large smoky acraea, is a butterfly in the family Nymphalidae. It is found in Senegal, Gambia, Guinea-Bissau, Guinea, Sierra Leone, southern Burkina Faso, Liberia, Ivory Coast, Ghana, Benin, Nigeria, Cameroon, Bioko, the Republic of the Congo and Angola (the Cabinda enclave).

== Description ==
A. camaena Drury (53 f). Forewing unicolorous smoke-black with black median spot but otherwise entirely without markings. Hindwing beyond the middle smoke-black with large free basal and discal dots, before the marginal band yellowish; marginal band incised at the veins, deep black with white dots. Sierra Leone to Nigeria and Fernando Po.

== Biology ==
The habitat consists of dry forests, including open coastal forests.

Both sexes are attracted to flowers.

The larvae feed on Premna hispida and Smeathmannia pubescens.

== Taxonomy ==
It is a member of the Acraea terpsicore species group - but see also Pierre & Bernaud, 2014
