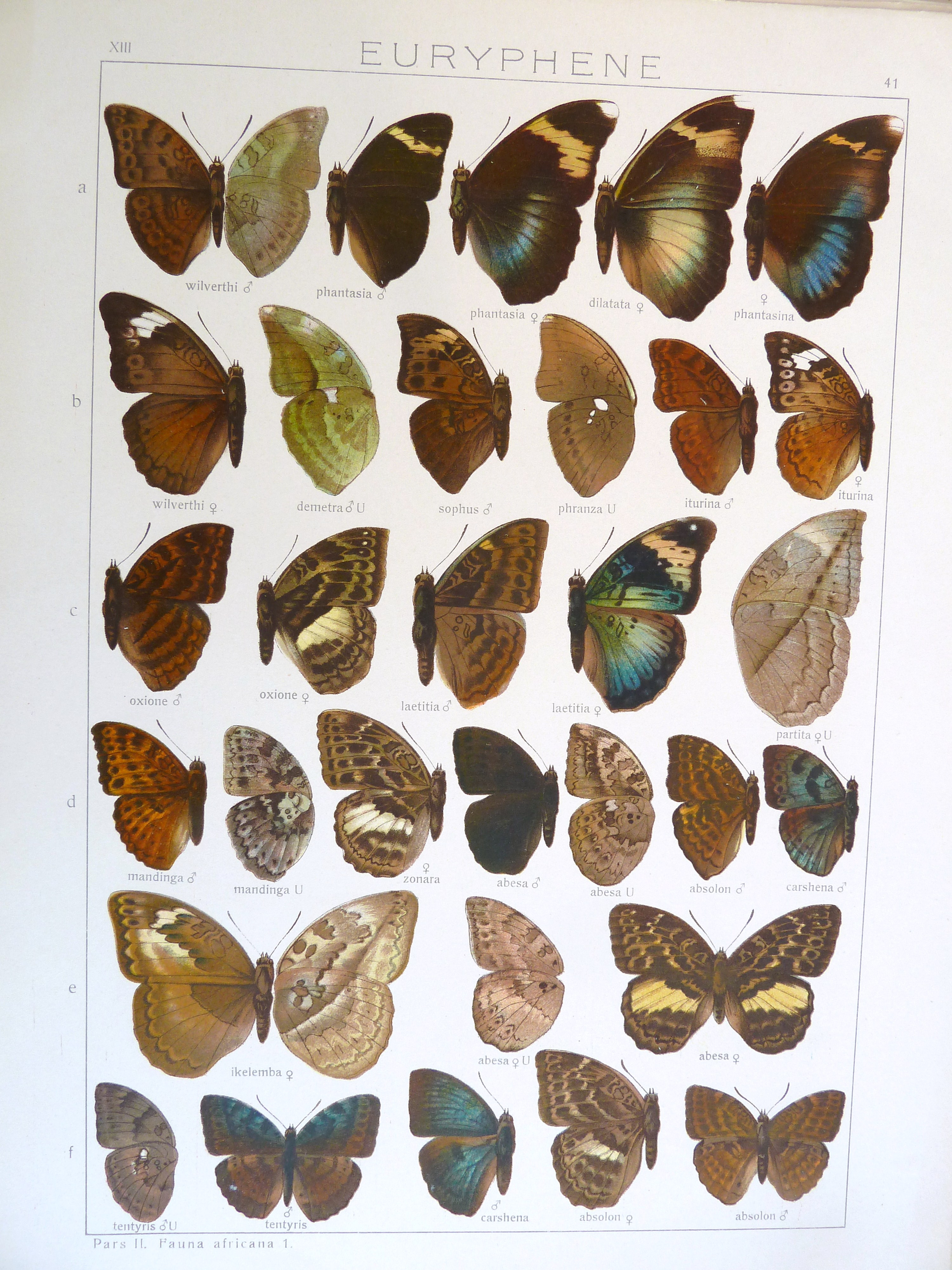
- In Adalbert Seitz's Fauna Africana

Scientific classification
- Kingdom: Animalia
- Phylum: Arthropoda
- Clade: Pancrustacea
- Class: Insecta
- Order: Lepidoptera
- Family: Nymphalidae
- Genus: Bebearia
- Species: B. phantasina

Binomial name
- Bebearia phantasina (Staudinger, 1891)

Synonyms
- Euryphene phantasiella var. phantasina Staudinger, 1891; Bebearia (Bebearia) phantasina; Bebearia phantasiella phantasina; Bebearia ultima Hecq, 1990

= Bebearia phantasina =

Western fantasia

Species of butterfly

Bebearia phantasina, the western fantasia, is a butterfly in the family Nymphalidae. It is found in Senegal, Guinea-Bissau, Guinea, Sierra Leone, Liberia, Ivory Coast, Ghana, Togo and Nigeria. The habitat consists of forests and dense secondary growth.

In phantasina Stgr. (41 a), from Sierra Leone and North Guinea to Lagos, the subapical band of the forewing is much narrower [than in Bebearia phantasiella ], only 1—2 mm. in breadth, and the distal area on the underside of the fore wing is only a little darker than the basal part, but proximally curved.

Adults are attracted to fermenting fruit.

== Subspecies ==
- Bebearia phantasina phantasina (Guinea, Sierra Leone, Liberia, Ivory Coast, Ghana, Togo, western Nigeria)
- Bebearia phantasina ultima Hecq, 1990 (Senegal, Guinea-Bissau, Guinea)

Torben Larsen developed a species numbering system for his 2005 publication Butterflies of West Africa. The nominate subspecies is #1027. The 'Larsen' numbers have since been used with permission in A Sharp Eye on Butterflies of Ghana.
