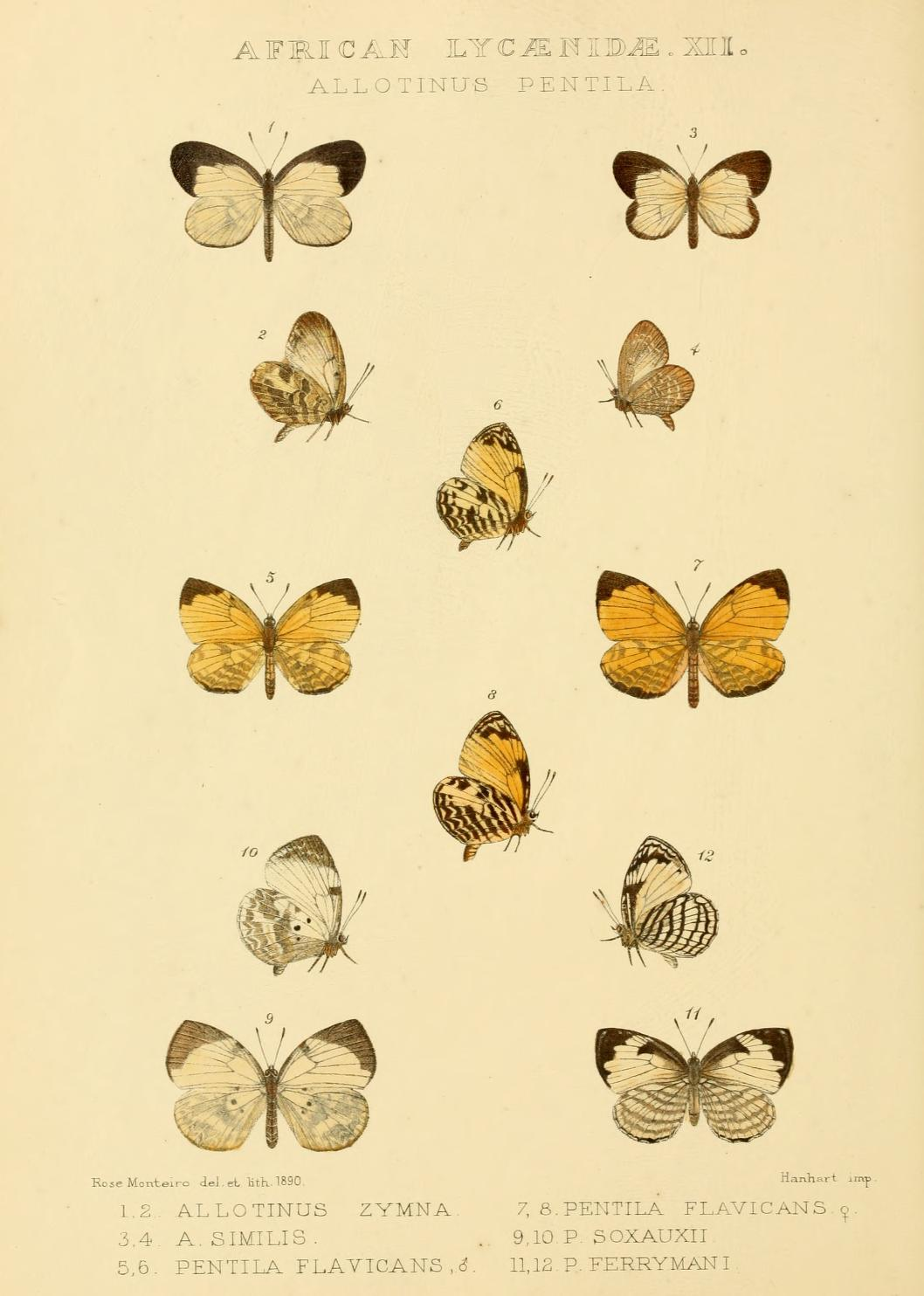

Scientific classification
- Kingdom: Animalia
- Phylum: Arthropoda
- Class: Insecta
- Order: Lepidoptera
- Family: Lycaenidae
- Genus: Liptena
- Species: L. ferrymani

Binomial name
- Liptena ferrymani (Grose-Smith & Kirby, 1891)

Synonyms
- Pentila ferrymani Grose-Smith & Kirby, 1891

= Liptena ferrymani =

Species of butterfly

Liptena ferrymani, the Ferryman's liptena, is a butterfly in the family Lycaenidae. It is found in Guinea-Bissau, Guinea, Ivory Coast, Nigeria, Cameroon and Sudan. The habitat consists of savanna, drier forests and gallery forests.

== Subspecies ==
- Liptena ferrymani ferrymani (Nigeria, northern Cameroon, southern Sudan)
- Liptena ferrymani bigoti Stempffer, 1964 (Guinea, northern Ivory Coast)
- Liptena ferrymani bissau Collins & Larsen, 2003 (Guinea-Bissau, Guinea)
