= Euphaedra hastiri =

Scientific classification
- Kingdom: Animalia
- Phylum: Arthropoda
- Clade: Pancrustacea
- Class: Insecta
- Order: Lepidoptera
- Family: Nymphalidae
- Genus: Euphaedra
- Species: E. hastiri

Binomial name
- Euphaedra hastiri Hecq, 1981

Synonyms
- Euphaedra (Gausapia) hastiri

Species of butterfly

Euphaedra hastiri, the insipid striped forester, is a butterfly in the family Nymphalidae. It is found in Senegal, Guinea-Bissau, Guinea and Sierra Leone. Its habitat consists of forests.

== Subspecies ==
- Euphaedra hastiri hastiri (Senegal, Guinea-Bissau, Guinea)
- Euphaedra hastiri polymnie Hecq, 1981 (western Sierra Leone)
