= Anthene hades =

Black ciliate blue

Scientific classification
- Domain: Eukaryota
- Kingdom: Animalia
- Phylum: Arthropoda
- Class: Insecta
- Order: Lepidoptera
- Family: Lycaenidae
- Genus: Anthene
- Species: A. hades

Binomial name
- Anthene hades (Bethune-Baker, 1910)

Synonyms
- Triclema hades Bethune-Baker, 1910; Anthene (Triclema) hades

Species of butterfly

Anthene hades, the black ciliate blue, is a butterfly in the family Lycaenidae. It is found in Guinea-Bissau, Guinea, Sierra Leone, Liberia, Ivory Coast, Ghana, Togo, Benin, Nigeria (south and the Cross River loop), Cameroon, Gabon, the Democratic Republic of the Congo (Uele, Tshuapa, Equateur, Sankuru and Lualaba), Uganda, western Kenya and western Tanzania. The habitat consists of forests, open country in the forest zone and Guinea savanna.

Adults have been recorded feeding from flowers. Males are also known to mud-puddle.
