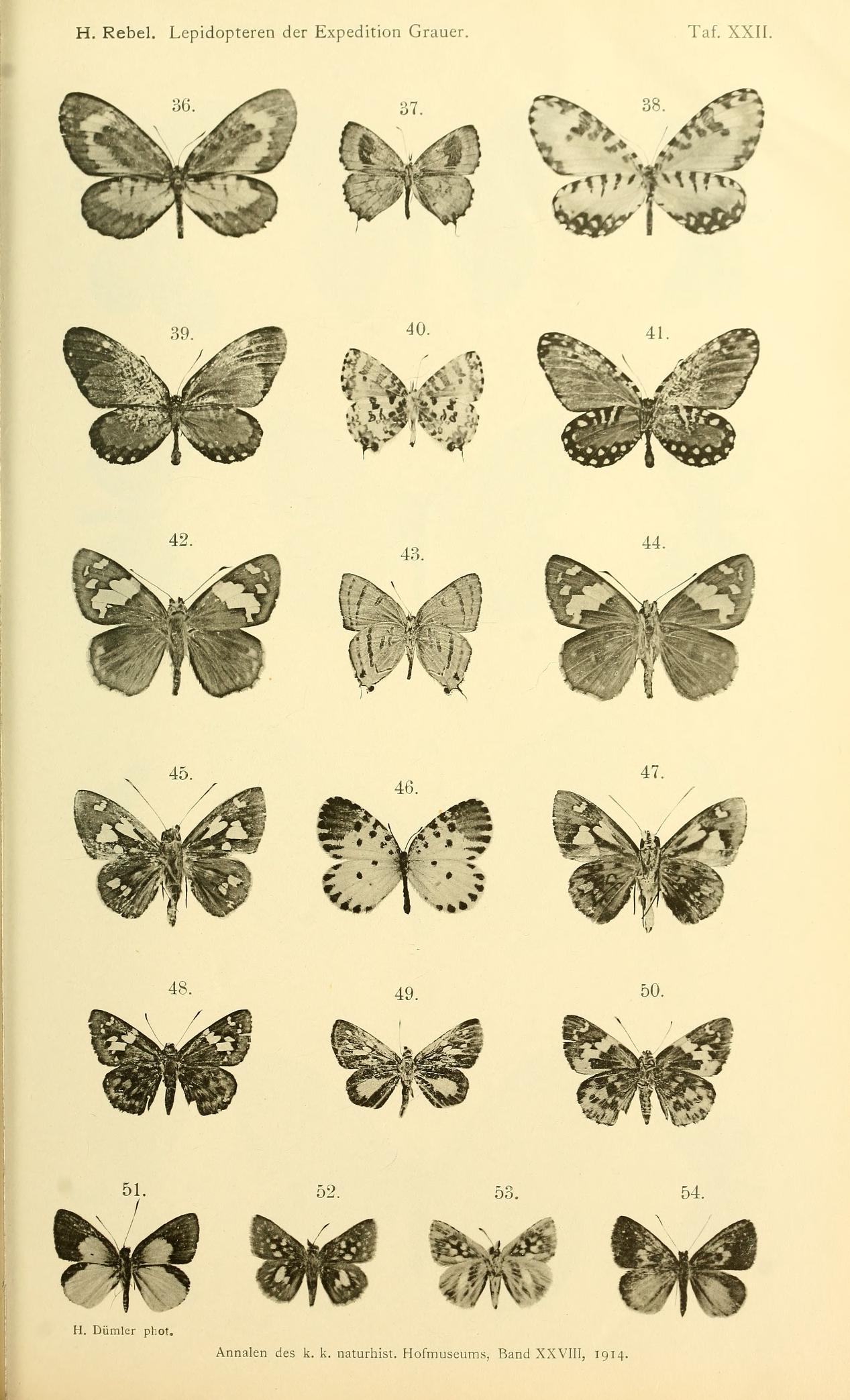
- Spialia ploetzi figures 52, 53

Scientific classification
- Kingdom: Animalia
- Phylum: Arthropoda
- Clade: Pancrustacea
- Class: Insecta
- Order: Lepidoptera
- Family: Hesperiidae
- Genus: Spialia
- Species: S. ploetzi

Binomial name
- Spialia ploetzi (Aurivillius, 1891)

Synonyms
- Hesperia ploetzi Aurivillius, 1891; Hesperia zebra Rebel, 1914 (not Butler, 1888); Spialia rebeli Higgins, 1924

= Spialia ploetzi =

Species of butterfly

Spialia ploetzi, the forest grizzled skipper, is a butterfly in the family Hesperiidae. It is found in Guinea-Bissau, Guinea, Sierra Leone, Liberia, Ivory Coast, Ghana, Togo, Benin, Nigeria, Cameroon, Gabon, the Republic of the Congo, Angola, the Democratic Republic of the Congo, Uganda, Kenya and Tanzania. The habitat consists of forests.

The larvae feed on Triumfetta species.

== Subspecies ==
- Spialia ploetzi ploetzi (Cameroon, Gabon, Congo, Angola, Democratic Republic of Congo, Uganda, western Kenya, north-western Tanzania)
- Spialia ploetzi occidentalis de Jong, 1977 (Guinea-Bissau, Guinea, Sierra Leone, Liberia, Ivory Coast, Ghana, Togo, Benin, Nigeria, western Cameroon)

Torben Larsen developed a species numbering system for his 2005 publication Butterflies of West Africa. The subspecies occidentalis is #1269. The 'Larsen' numbers have since been used with permission in A Sharp Eye on Butterflies of Ghana.

== Etymology ==
The name honours Carl Plötz.
