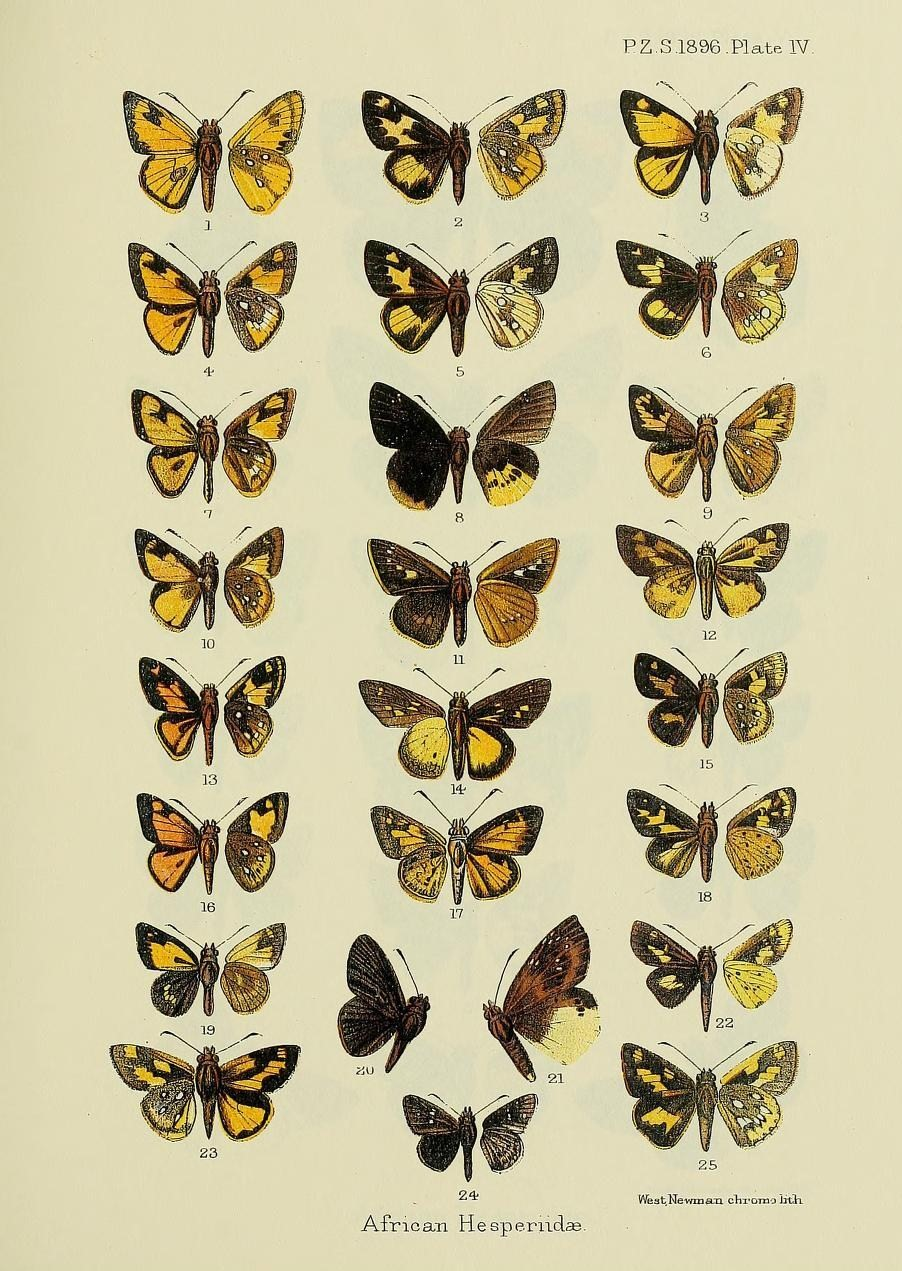
- Gorgyra rubescens figure 17 male, figure 18 female

Scientific classification
- Domain: Eukaryota
- Kingdom: Animalia
- Phylum: Arthropoda
- Class: Insecta
- Order: Lepidoptera
- Family: Hesperiidae
- Genus: Gorgyra
- Species: G. rubescens

Binomial name
- Gorgyra rubescens Holland, 1896

Synonyms
- Gorgyra tessmanni Strand, 1913

= Gorgyra rubescens =

Species of butterfly

Gorgyra rubescens, the rufous leaf sitter, is a butterfly in the family Hesperiidae. It is found in Nigeria (the Cross River loop), Cameroon, Gabon, the Republic of the Congo, the Central African Republic and the Democratic Republic of the Congo. The habitat consists of primary forests.
