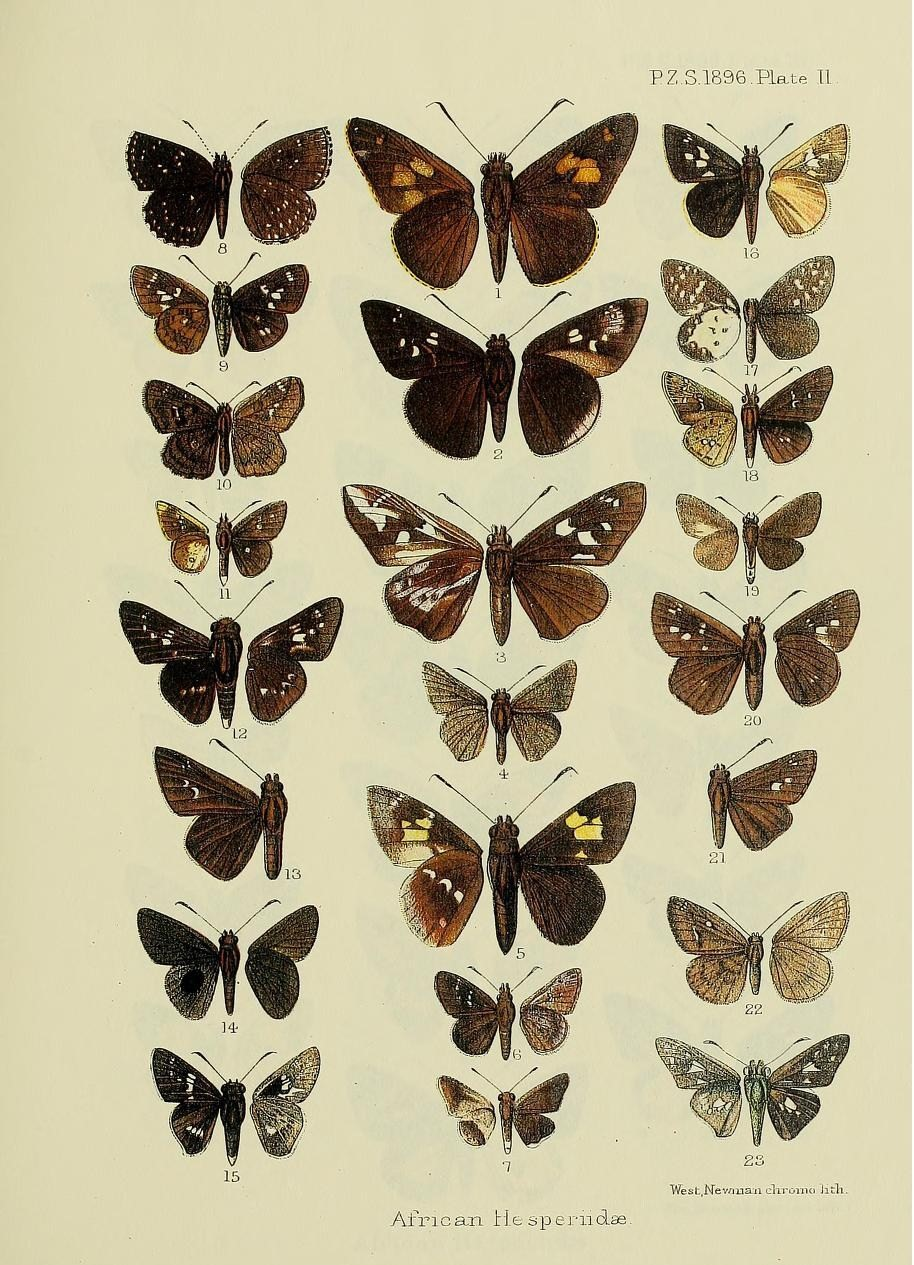
- Gorgyra johnstoni figure 6

Scientific classification
- Domain: Eukaryota
- Kingdom: Animalia
- Phylum: Arthropoda
- Class: Insecta
- Order: Lepidoptera
- Family: Hesperiidae
- Genus: Gorgyra
- Species: G. johnstoni

Binomial name
- Gorgyra johnstoni (Butler, 1894)

Synonyms
- Aeromachus johnstoni Butler, 1894

= Gorgyra johnstoni =

Species of butterfly

Gorgyra johnstoni, Johnston's ranger or Johnston's skipper, is a butterfly in the family Hesperiidae. It is found along the coast of Kenya and in Tanzania, the Democratic Republic of the Congo (Shaba), Malawi, Zambia, Mozambique and eastern Zimbabwe. The habitat consists of forests, riverine forests, forest margins, Brachystegia woodland and woodland.

Adults are attracted to flowers. They are on wing year-round.
