= Gorgyra warreni =

Scientific classification
- Kingdom: Animalia
- Phylum: Arthropoda
- Clade: Pancrustacea
- Class: Insecta
- Order: Lepidoptera
- Family: Hesperiidae
- Genus: Gorgyra
- Species: G. warreni

Binomial name
- Gorgyra warreni Collins & Larsen, 2008

Species of butterfly

Gorgyra warreni is a butterfly in the family Hesperiidae. It is found in Cameroon and Nigeria.
