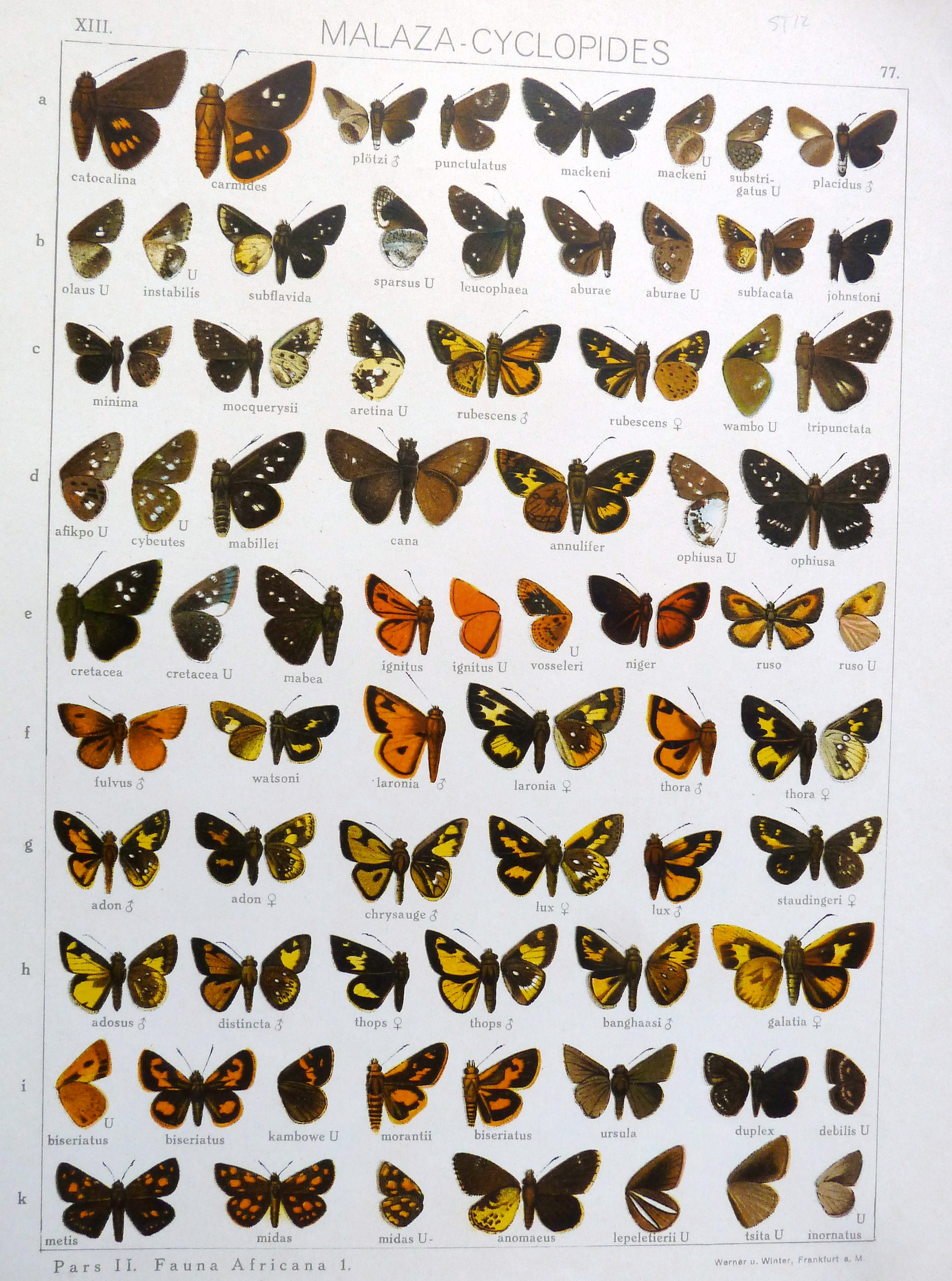

Scientific classification
- Kingdom: Animalia
- Phylum: Arthropoda
- Class: Insecta
- Order: Lepidoptera
- Family: Hesperiidae
- Genus: Gorgyra
- Species: G. vosseleri

Binomial name
- Gorgyra vosseleri Grünberg, 1907

Synonyms
- Gorgyra subfacatus vosseleri Grünberg, 1907

= Gorgyra vosseleri =

Species of butterfly

Gorgyra vosseleri is a butterfly in the family Hesperiidae. It is found in Tanzania (from the north-east to the Usambara Mountains). The habitat consists of submontane forests at altitudes between 900 and 1,200 meters.

Adult males are attracted to wet sand.
