= Gorgyra bibulus =

Scientific classification
- Domain: Eukaryota
- Kingdom: Animalia
- Phylum: Arthropoda
- Class: Insecta
- Order: Lepidoptera
- Family: Hesperiidae
- Genus: Gorgyra
- Species: G. bibulus

Binomial name
- Gorgyra bibulus Riley, 1929

Species of butterfly

Gorgyra bibulus is a butterfly in the family Hesperiidae. It is found in Cameroon, the Democratic Republic of the Congo (Kivu and Shaba), western Uganda, central Kenya, Tanzania, Malawi and Zambia. The habitat consists of montane forests.

The larvae feed on Drypetes gerrardii and Rourea thomsonii.
