= Gorgyra diva =

Scientific classification
- Domain: Eukaryota
- Kingdom: Animalia
- Phylum: Arthropoda
- Class: Insecta
- Order: Lepidoptera
- Family: Hesperiidae
- Genus: Gorgyra
- Species: G. diva

Binomial name
- Gorgyra diva Evans, 1937

Species of butterfly

Gorgyra diva is a butterfly in the family Hesperiidae. It is found in Kenya, Tanzania and Zambia. The habitat consists of forests, forest margins and heavy woodlands at altitudes up to 1,500 meters.

The larvae feed on Rourea orientalis.
