= Gorgyra kalinzu =

Scientific classification
- Kingdom: Animalia
- Phylum: Arthropoda
- Clade: Pancrustacea
- Class: Insecta
- Order: Lepidoptera
- Family: Hesperiidae
- Genus: Gorgyra
- Species: G. kalinzu

Binomial name
- Gorgyra kalinzu Evans, 1949

Species of butterfly

Gorgyra kalinzu, the Kalinzu leaf sitter, is a butterfly in the family Hesperiidae. It is found in eastern Nigeria, Cameroon, Gabon, the Republic of the Congo, the Central African Republic, the central and eastern part of the Democratic Republic of the Congo, western Uganda, western Kenya, western Tanzania and Zambia. The habitat consists of forests.
