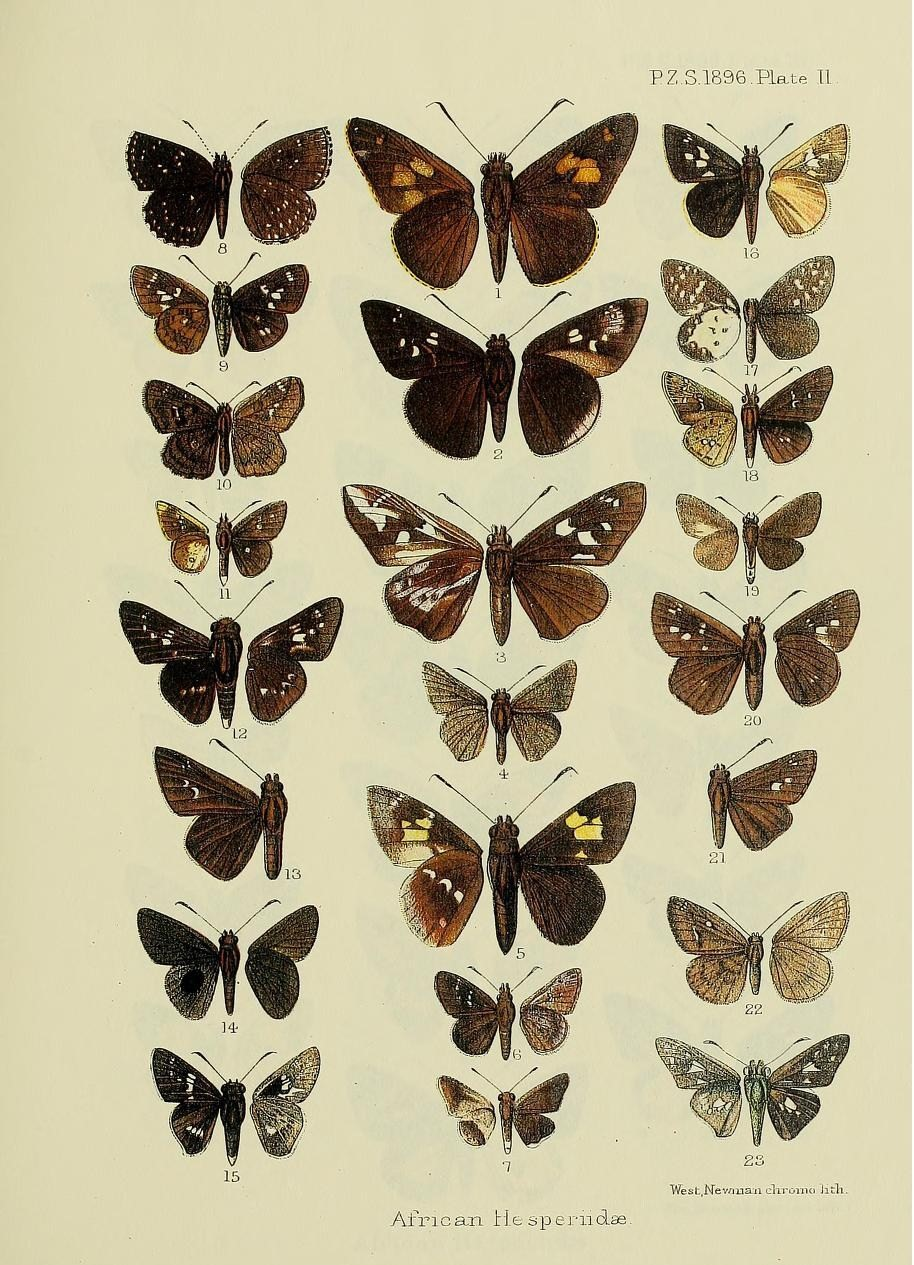
- Figures 6 and 11

Scientific classification
- Kingdom: Animalia
- Phylum: Arthropoda
- Class: Insecta
- Order: Lepidoptera
- Family: Hesperiidae
- Tribe: Astictopterini
- Genus: Gorgyra; Holland, 1896

Synonyms
- Oedaloneura Mabille, 1904

= Gorgyra (skipper) =

Genus of butterflies

Gorgyra is an Afrotropical genus of grass skippers in the family Hesperiidae. Larvae feed mainly on Connaraceae, including Rourea. Other recorded larval food plants include Drypetes and Macadamia. Their habitat is generally lowland tropical rain forest and savanna.

== Species ==
- Gorgyra aburae (Plötz, 1879)
- Gorgyra afikpo Druce, 1909
- Gorgyra aretina (Hewitson, 1878)
- Gorgyra bibulus Riley, 1929
- Gorgyra bina Evans, 1937
- Gorgyra bule Miller, 1964
- Gorgyra diva Evans, 1937
- Gorgyra diversata Evans, 1937
- Gorgyra heterochrus (Mabille, 1890)
- Gorgyra johnstoni (Butler, 1894)
- Gorgyra kalinzu Evans, 1949
- Gorgyra minima Holland, 1896
- Gorgyra mocquerysii Holland, 1896
- Gorgyra pali Evans, 1937
- Gorgyra rubescens Holland, 1896
- Gorgyra sara Evans, 1937
- Gorgyra sola Evans, 1937
- Gorgyra subfacatus (Mabille, 1890)
- Gorgyra subflavidus Holland, 1896
- Gorgyra vosseleri Grünberg, 1907
- Gorgyra warreni Collins & Larsen, 2008
