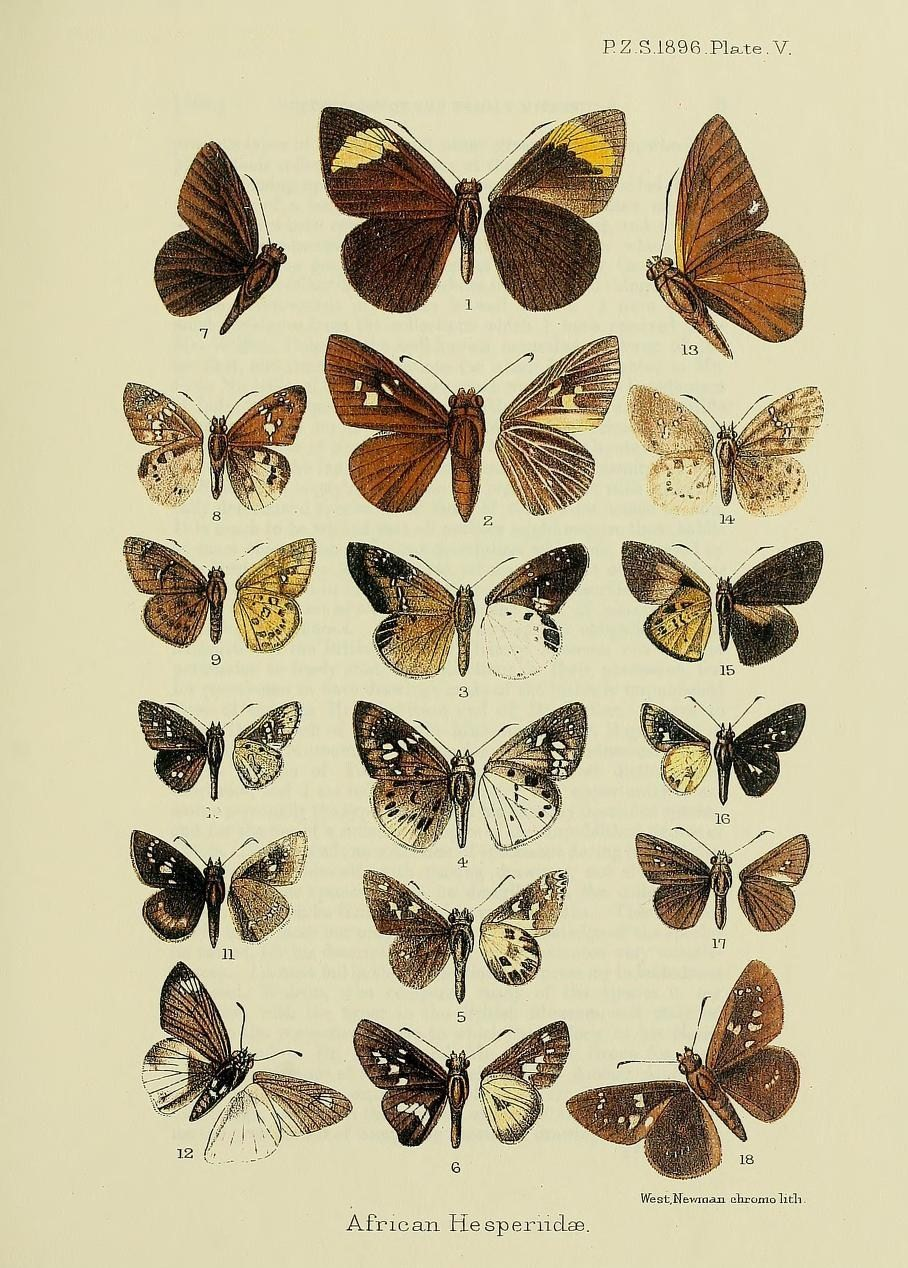
- Gorgyra subflavidus figure 16

Scientific classification
- Domain: Eukaryota
- Kingdom: Animalia
- Phylum: Arthropoda
- Class: Insecta
- Order: Lepidoptera
- Family: Hesperiidae
- Genus: Gorgyra
- Species: G. subflavidus

Binomial name
- Gorgyra subflavidus Holland, 1896

Synonyms
- Gorgyra pan Evans, 1947

= Gorgyra subflavidus =

Species of butterfly

Gorgyra subflavidus is a butterfly in the family Hesperiidae. It is found along the coasts of Kenya and Tanzania and in Mozambique (from the coast to the north). The habitat consists of forests.
