= Gorgyra bule =

Scientific classification
- Domain: Eukaryota
- Kingdom: Animalia
- Phylum: Arthropoda
- Class: Insecta
- Order: Lepidoptera
- Family: Hesperiidae
- Genus: Gorgyra
- Species: G. bule

Binomial name
- Gorgyra bule Miller, 1964

Species of butterfly

Gorgyra bule, or Miller's leaf sitter, is a butterfly in the family Hesperiidae. It is found in Ghana, western Nigeria, Cameroon and the Central African Republic. The habitat consists of forests.
