= Leona na =

Scientific classification
- Domain: Eukaryota
- Kingdom: Animalia
- Phylum: Arthropoda
- Class: Insecta
- Order: Lepidoptera
- Family: Hesperiidae
- Genus: Leona
- Species: L. na

Binomial name
- Leona na (Lindsey & Miller, 1965)

Synonyms
- Caenides na Lindsey and Miller, 1965

Species of butterfly

Leona na, the dark recluse, is a butterfly in the family Hesperiidae. It is found in Liberia. The habitat probably consists of dense forests.
