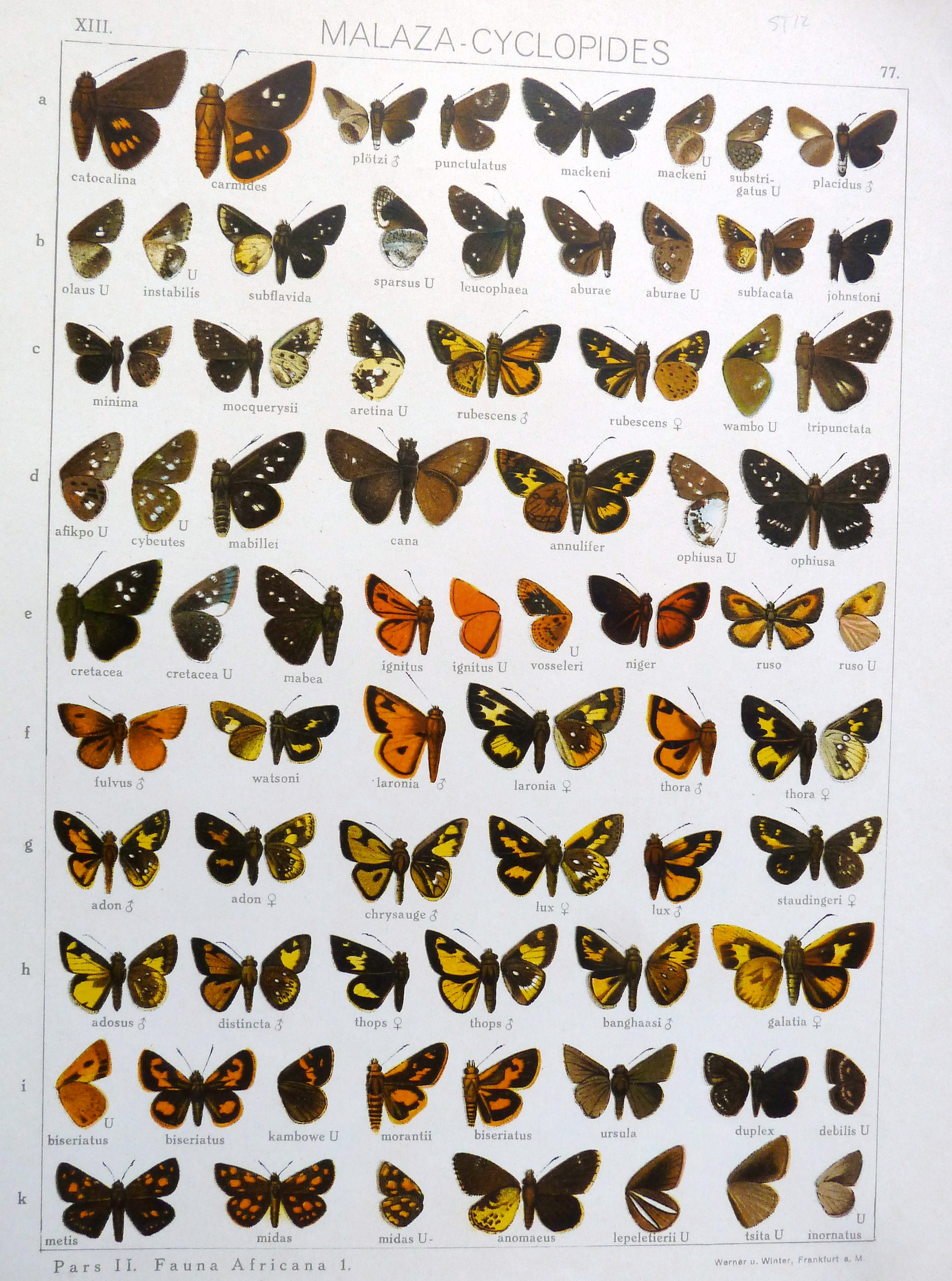

Scientific classification
- Kingdom: Animalia
- Phylum: Arthropoda
- Clade: Pancrustacea
- Class: Insecta
- Order: Lepidoptera
- Family: Hesperiidae
- Genus: Gorgyra
- Species: G. afikpo

Binomial name
- Gorgyra afikpo Druce, 1909

= Gorgyra afikpo =

Species of butterfly

Gorgyra afikpo, the large leaf sitter, is a butterfly in the family Hesperiidae. It is found in Senegal, Sierra Leone, Ivory Coast, Ghana, Nigeria, Cameroon, the Republic of the Congo, the Central African Republic, Uganda and north-western Tanzania. The habitat consists of forests.

The larvae feed on Connarus thonningii and Dichapetalum guineense.
