= Eresiomera petersi =

Scientific classification
- Kingdom: Animalia
- Phylum: Arthropoda
- Class: Insecta
- Order: Lepidoptera
- Family: Lycaenidae
- Genus: Eresiomera
- Species: E. petersi

Binomial name
- Eresiomera petersi (Stempffer & Bennett, 1956)

Synonyms
- Baliochila petersi Stempffer & Bennett, 1956; Pseuderesia issia Stempffer, 1969

Species of butterfly

Eresiomera petersi, the Peters' pearly, is a butterfly in the family Lycaenidae. It is found in central and eastern Liberia, Ivory Coast and Ghana. The habitat consists of forests.
