= Gorgyra diversata =

Scientific classification
- Domain: Eukaryota
- Kingdom: Animalia
- Phylum: Arthropoda
- Class: Insecta
- Order: Lepidoptera
- Family: Hesperiidae
- Genus: Gorgyra
- Species: G. diversata

Binomial name
- Gorgyra diversata Evans, 1937

Synonyms
- Gorgyra aburae var. diversata Holland, 1896

Species of butterfly

Gorgyra diversata, the dark leaf sitter, is a butterfly in the family Hesperiidae. It is found in Guinea, Sierra Leone, Liberia, Ivory Coast, Ghana, Togo, Nigeria, Cameroon, the Republic of the Congo, the Central African Republic, Angola, the Democratic Republic of the Congo, Uganda (from the western part of the country to Bwamba) and western Kenya. The habitat consists of forests.
