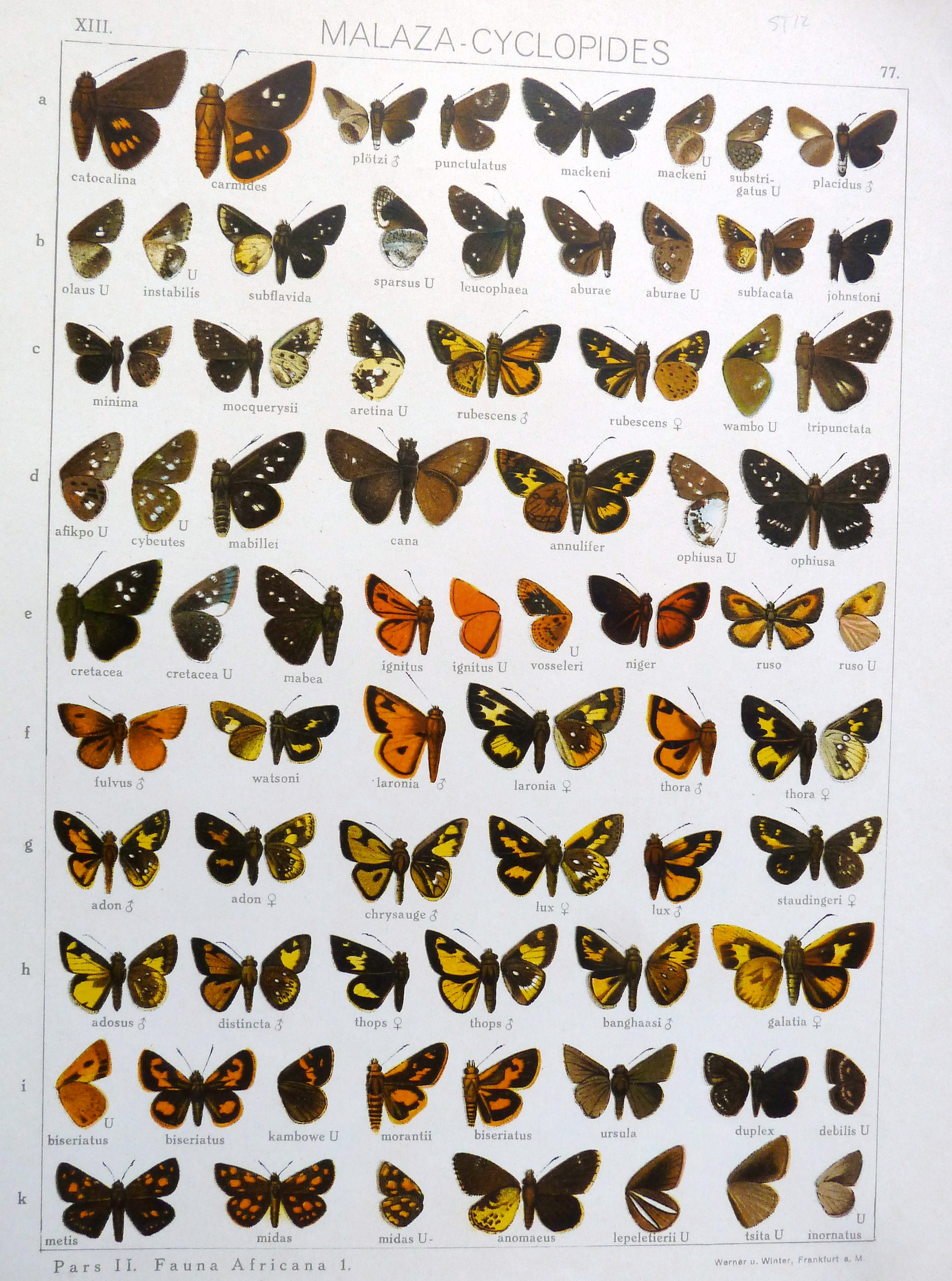

Scientific classification
- Kingdom: Animalia
- Phylum: Arthropoda
- Clade: Pancrustacea
- Class: Insecta
- Order: Lepidoptera
- Family: Hesperiidae
- Genus: Gorgyra
- Species: G. aretina

Binomial name
- Gorgyra aretina (Hewitson, 1878)

Synonyms
- Ceratrichia aretina Hewitson, 1878; Apaustus dolus Plötz, 1879; Gastrochaeta albiventris Mabille; Holland, 1896; Gorgyra aretina var. aretinodes Strand, 1913

= Gorgyra aretina =

Species of butterfly

Gorgyra aretina, the blotched leaf sitter, is a butterfly in the family Hesperiidae. It is found in Guinea, Sierra Leone, Liberia, Ivory Coast, Ghana, Togo, Nigeria, Cameroon, Gabon, the Central African Republic, the Democratic Republic of the Congo, Sudan, Uganda, western Kenya, western Tanzania and north-western Zambia. The habitat consists of forests.

Adults of both sexes are attracted to flowers and males mud-puddle.

Torben Larsen developed a species numbering system for his 2005 publication Butterflies of West Africa. This species is #1284. The 'Larsen' numbers have since been used with permission in A Sharp Eye on Butterflies of Ghana.
