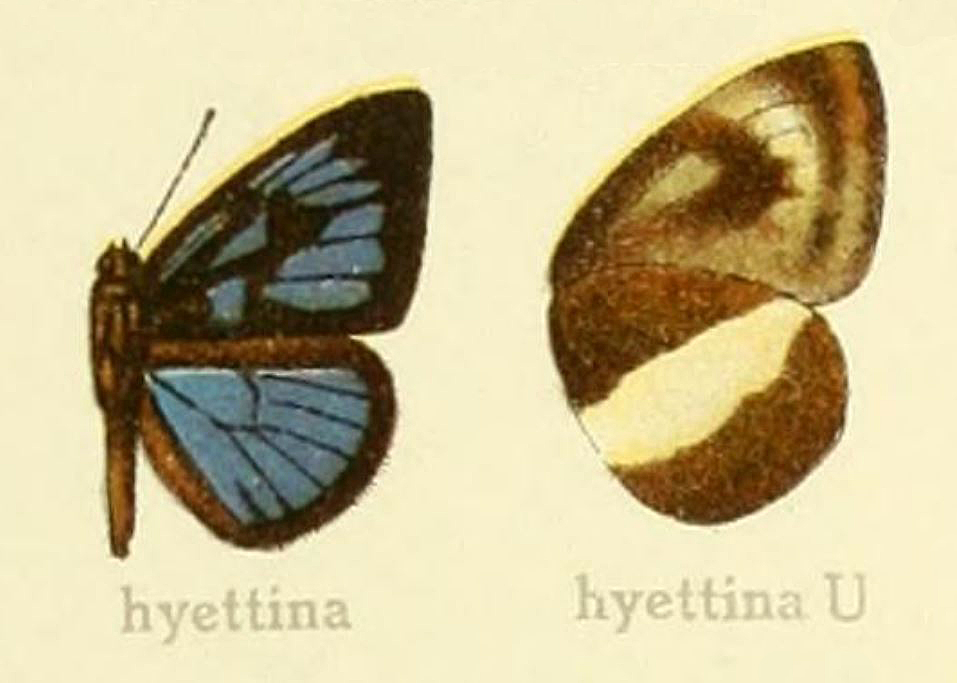

Scientific classification
- Domain: Eukaryota
- Kingdom: Animalia
- Phylum: Arthropoda
- Class: Insecta
- Order: Lepidoptera
- Family: Lycaenidae
- Genus: Hypophytala
- Species: H. hyettina

Binomial name
- Hypophytala hyettina (Aurivillius, 1897)

Synonyms
- Phytala hyettina Aurivillius, 1897

= Hypophytala hyettina =

Species of butterfly

Hypophytala hyettina, the western flash, is a butterfly in the family Lycaenidae. It is found in Sierra Leone, Liberia, Ivory Coast and Ghana. The habitat consists of forests.
