= Gorgyra bina =

Scientific classification
- Domain: Eukaryota
- Kingdom: Animalia
- Phylum: Arthropoda
- Class: Insecta
- Order: Lepidoptera
- Family: Hesperiidae
- Genus: Gorgyra
- Species: G. bina

Binomial name
- Gorgyra bina Evans, 1937

Species of butterfly

Gorgyra bina, the Bina leaf sitter, is a butterfly in the family Hesperiidae. It is found in Sierra Leone, Liberia, Ghana, Nigeria, Cameroon, Gabon, the Republic of the Congo, the Democratic Republic of the Congo, Uganda and north-western Tanzania. The habitat consists of forests.
