= Pentila condamini =

Scientific classification
- Domain: Eukaryota
- Kingdom: Animalia
- Phylum: Arthropoda
- Class: Insecta
- Order: Lepidoptera
- Family: Lycaenidae
- Genus: Pentila
- Species: P. condamini

Binomial name
- Pentila condamini Stempffer, 1963

Species of butterfly

Pentila condamini, the Condamin's red pentila, is a butterfly in the family Lycaenidae. It is found in Senegal, Sierra Leone, Liberia and possibly western Ivory Coast.
