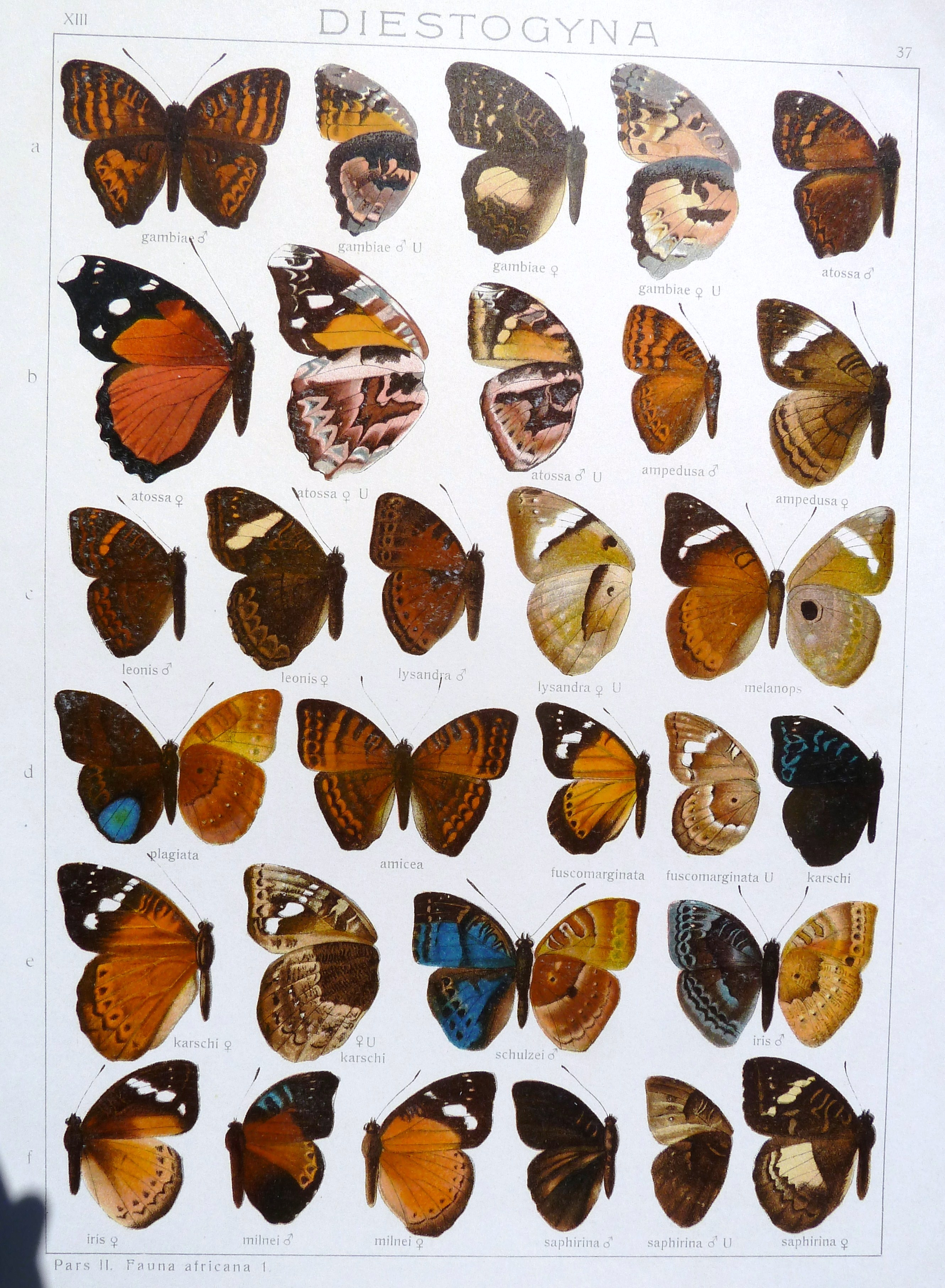
- In Adalbert Seitz's Fauna Africana

Scientific classification
- Kingdom: Animalia
- Phylum: Arthropoda
- Clade: Pancrustacea
- Class: Insecta
- Order: Lepidoptera
- Family: Nymphalidae
- Genus: Euriphene
- Species: E. leonis

Binomial name
- Euriphene leonis (Aurivillius, 1899)

Synonyms
- Diestogyna ampedusa var. leonis Aurivillius, 1899; Euriphene (Euriphene) leonis

= Euriphene leonis =

Species of butterfly

Euriphene leonis, the Sierra Leone nymph, is a butterfly in the family Nymphalidae. It is found in Sierra Leone, Liberia, Ivory Coast and possibly western Ghana. The habitat consists of forests.

Torben Larsen developed a species numbering system for his 2005 publication Butterflies of West Africa. This species is #988. The 'Larsen' numbers have since been used with permission in A Sharp Eye on Butterflies of Ghana.
