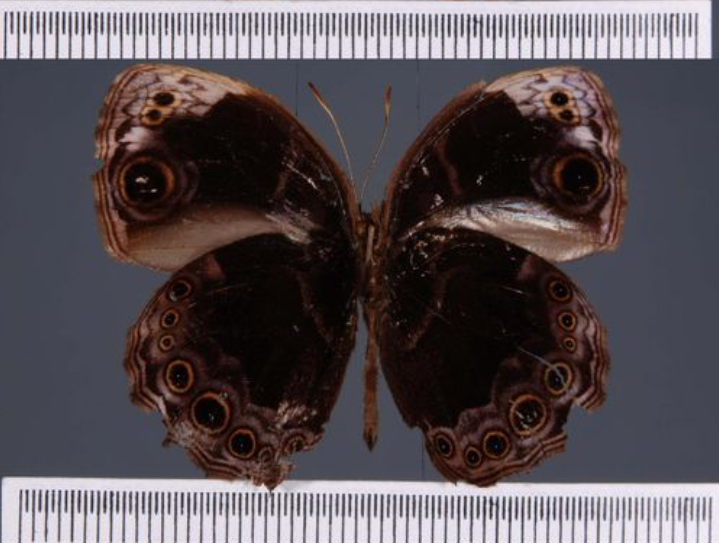

Scientific classification
- Kingdom: Animalia
- Phylum: Arthropoda
- Clade: Pancrustacea
- Class: Insecta
- Order: Lepidoptera
- Family: Nymphalidae
- Genus: Bicyclus
- Species: B. dekeyseri

Binomial name
- Bicyclus dekeyseri (Condamin, 1958)

Synonyms
- Mycalesis dekeyseri Condamin, 1958

= Bicyclus dekeyseri =

Western scalloped bush brown

Species of butterfly

Bicyclus dekeyseri, the western scalloped bush brown, is a butterfly in the family Nymphalidae. It is found in Guinea, Liberia, Ivory Coast and Ghana. The habitat consists of deep forests.
