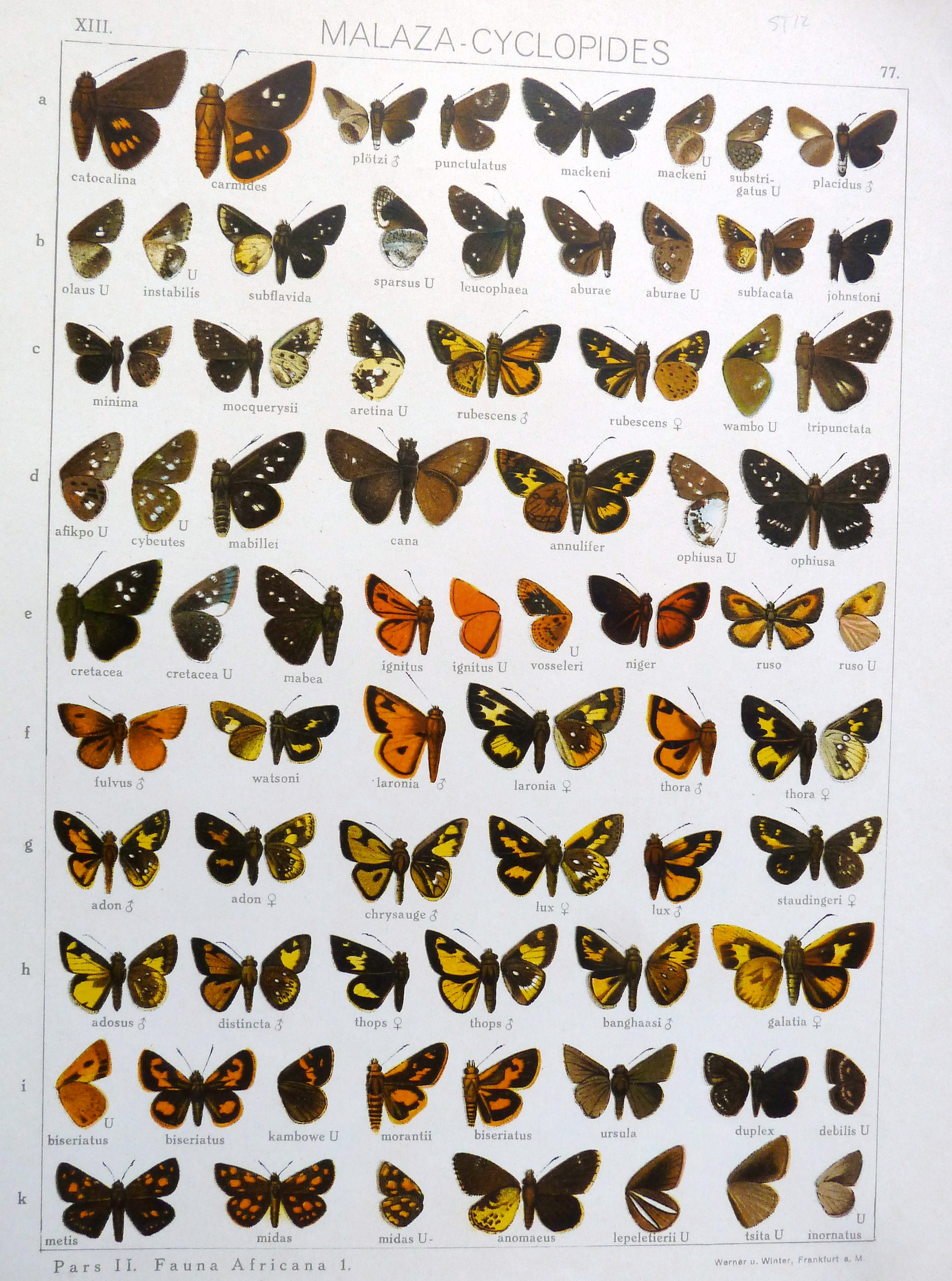

Scientific classification
- Domain: Eukaryota
- Kingdom: Animalia
- Phylum: Arthropoda
- Class: Insecta
- Order: Lepidoptera
- Family: Hesperiidae
- Genus: Gorgyra
- Species: G. aburae

Binomial name
- Gorgyra aburae (Plötz, 1879)

Synonyms
- Apaustus aburae Plötz, 1879

= Gorgyra aburae =

Species of butterfly

Gorgyra aburae, the swollen leaf sitter, is a butterfly in the family Hesperiidae. It is found in Sierra Leone, Liberia, Ivory Coast, Ghana, Nigeria and western Cameroon. The habitat consists of forests.
