= Gorgyra sola =

Scientific classification
- Kingdom: Animalia
- Phylum: Arthropoda
- Class: Insecta
- Order: Lepidoptera
- Family: Hesperiidae
- Genus: Gorgyra
- Species: G. sola

Binomial name
- Gorgyra sola Evans, 1937

Species of butterfly

Gorgyra sola, the rare leaf sitter, is a butterfly in the family Hesperiidae. It is found in Sierra Leone, Liberia, Ivory Coast, Ghana, Nigeria, Cameroon, Gabon and the western part of the Democratic Republic of the Congo. The habitat consists of forests.
