= Gorgyra pali =

Scientific classification
- Domain: Eukaryota
- Kingdom: Animalia
- Phylum: Arthropoda
- Class: Insecta
- Order: Lepidoptera
- Family: Hesperiidae
- Genus: Gorgyra
- Species: G. pali

Binomial name
- Gorgyra pali Evans, 1937

Species of butterfly

Gorgyra pali, the pale leaf sitter, is a butterfly in the family Hesperiidae. It is found in Sierra Leone, Liberia, Ivory Coast, Ghana, Togo, Nigeria, Cameroon, the Central African Republic, the Democratic Republic of the Congo, Uganda and western Kenya. The habitat consists of forests.
