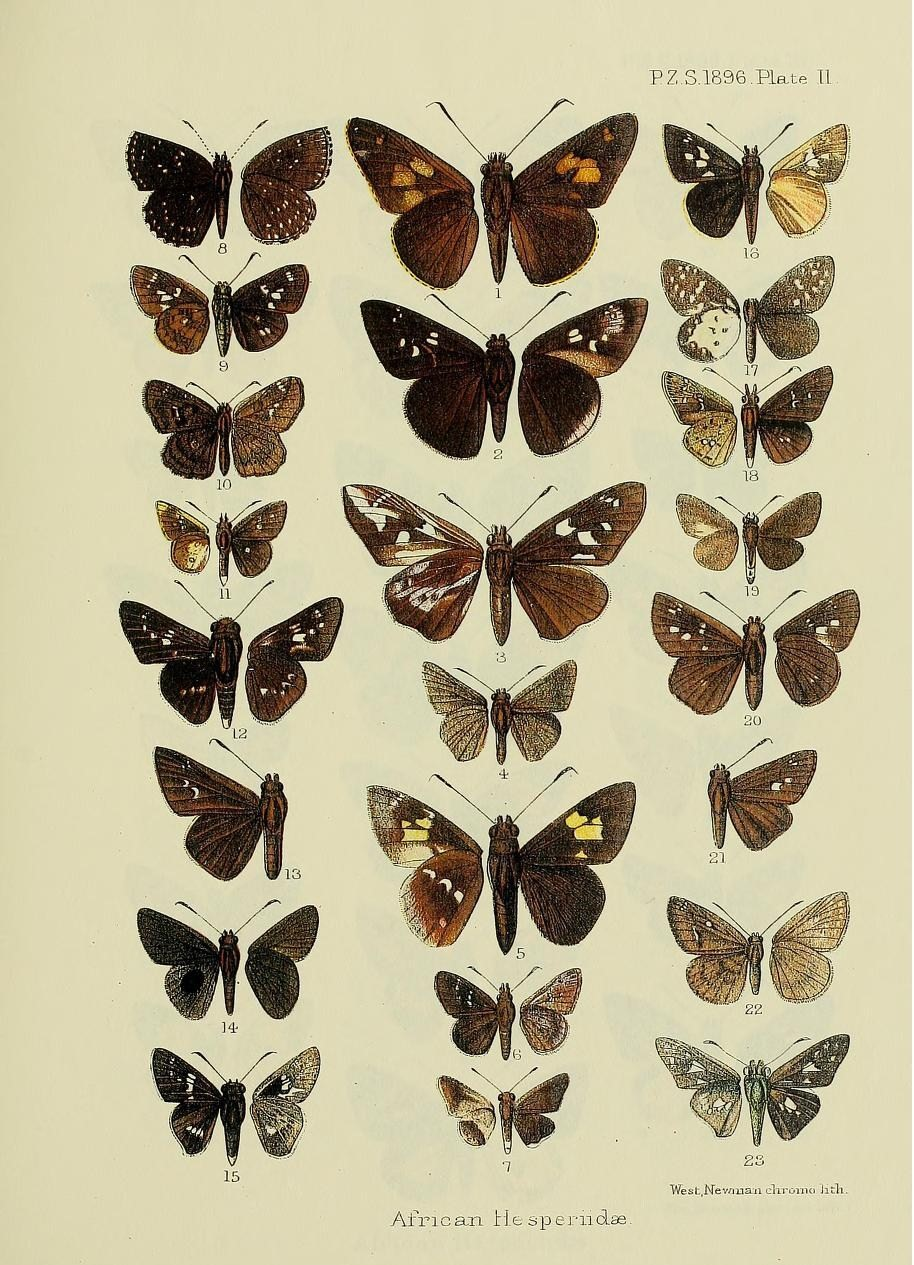
- Gorgyra subfacatus figure 11

Scientific classification
- Domain: Eukaryota
- Kingdom: Animalia
- Phylum: Arthropoda
- Class: Insecta
- Order: Lepidoptera
- Family: Hesperiidae
- Genus: Gorgyra
- Species: G. subfacatus

Binomial name
- Gorgyra subfacatus (Mabille, 1890)

Synonyms
- Cobalus subfacatus Mabille, 1890

= Gorgyra subfacatus =

Species of butterfly

Gorgyra subfacatus, the ochreous leaf sitter, is a butterfly in the family Hesperiidae. It is found in Guinea-Bissau, Guinea, Sierra Leone, Liberia, Ivory Coast, Ghana and western Nigeria. The habitat consists of forests.

Adults are attracted to flowers, such as those of Lantana species.
