= Iolaus moyambina =

Scientific classification
- Kingdom: Animalia
- Phylum: Arthropoda
- Class: Insecta
- Order: Lepidoptera
- Family: Lycaenidae
- Genus: Iolaus
- Species: I. moyambina

Binomial name
- Iolaus moyambina (Stempffer & Bennett, 1959)

Synonyms
- Epamera moyambina Stempffer & Bennett, 1959; Iolaus (Epamera) moyambina

Species of butterfly

Iolaus moyambina, the Sierra Leone fine sapphire, is a butterfly in the family Lycaenidae. It is found in Guinea, Sierra Leone and western Liberia.
