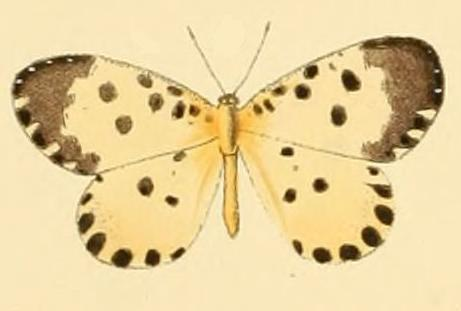

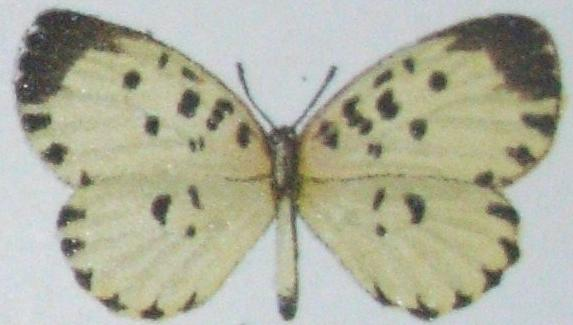

Scientific classification
- Kingdom: Animalia
- Phylum: Arthropoda
- Class: Insecta
- Order: Lepidoptera
- Family: Lycaenidae
- Genus: Pentila
- Species: P. abraxas

Binomial name
- Pentila abraxas (Westwood, 1851)

Synonyms
- Liptena abraxas Westwood, 1851; Pentila tripunctata Aurivillius, 1895

= Pentila abraxas =

Species of butterfly

Pentila abraxas, the three-dot pentila, is a butterfly in the family Lycaenidae. It is found in Guinea, Sierra Leone, Liberia and western Ivory Coast. The habitat consists of forests.
