= Ceratrichia crowleyi =

Scientific classification
- Kingdom: Animalia
- Phylum: Arthropoda
- Class: Insecta
- Order: Lepidoptera
- Family: Hesperiidae
- Genus: Ceratrichia
- Species: C. crowleyi

Binomial name
- Ceratrichia crowleyi Riley, 1925

Species of butterfly

Ceratrichia crowleyi, also known as Crowley's forest sylph, is a species of butterfly in the family Hesperiidae. It is found in Sierra Leone, Liberia, Ivory Coast and south-western Ghana. The habitat consists of wetter forests, especially near streams.
