= Cymothoe hartigi =

Scientific classification
- Kingdom: Animalia
- Phylum: Arthropoda
- Class: Insecta
- Order: Lepidoptera
- Family: Nymphalidae
- Genus: Cymothoe
- Species: C. hartigi

Binomial name
- Cymothoe hartigi Belcastro, 1990

Synonyms
- Cymothoe hartigi f. tiwaiensis Belcastro, 1990

Species of butterfly

Cymothoe hartigi, or Hartig's red glider, is a butterfly in the family Nymphalidae. It is found in Guinea, Sierra Leone, Liberia and Ivory Coast. The habitat consists of primary forests.

== Subspecies ==
- Cymothoe hartigi hartigi (eastern Guinea, south-eastern Sierra Leone, western Liberia)
- Cymothoe hartigi vanessae Warren-Gash, 2003 (south-western Ivory Coast)
