= Gorgyra sara =

Scientific classification
- Kingdom: Animalia
- Phylum: Arthropoda
- Clade: Pancrustacea
- Class: Insecta
- Order: Lepidoptera
- Family: Hesperiidae
- Genus: Gorgyra
- Species: G. sara

Binomial name
- Gorgyra sara Evans, 1937

Species of butterfly

Gorgyra sara, the common leaf sitter, is a butterfly in the family Hesperiidae. It is found in Sierra Leone, Liberia, Ivory Coast, Ghana, Nigeria, Cameroon, Equatorial Guinea (Mbini), the Republic of the Congo, the Central African Republic and the Democratic Republic of the Congo. The habitat consists of forests.

The larvae feed on Cnestis ferruginea.

Torben Larsen developed a species numbering system for his 2005 publication Butterflies of West Africa. This species is #1295. The 'Larsen' numbers have since been used with permission in A Sharp Eye on Butterflies of Ghana.
