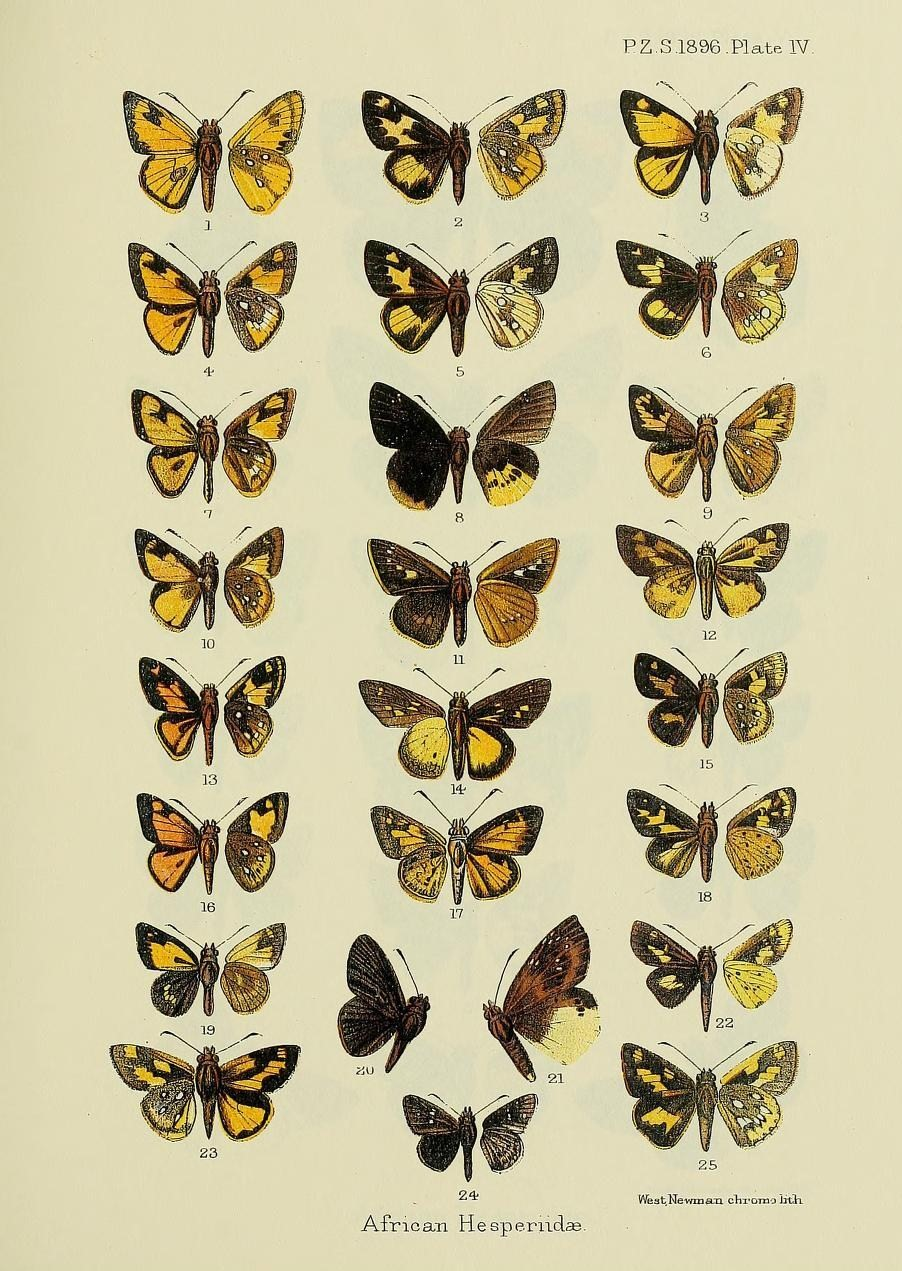
- Gorgyra minima figure 24

Scientific classification
- Kingdom: Animalia
- Phylum: Arthropoda
- Clade: Pancrustacea
- Class: Insecta
- Order: Lepidoptera
- Family: Hesperiidae
- Genus: Gorgyra
- Species: G. minima

Binomial name
- Gorgyra minima Holland, 1896

= Gorgyra minima =

Species of butterfly

Gorgyra minima, the minimal leaf sitter, is a butterfly in the family Hesperiidae. It is found in Guinea, Sierra Leone, Liberia, Ivory Coast, Ghana, western Nigeria, Cameroon, Gabon, the Republic of the Congo, the Democratic Republic of the Congo, Uganda (from the west to the West Nile Province) and western Kenya. The habitat consists of forests, including well-developed secondary growth, and Guinea savanna.

Torben Larsen developed a species numbering system for his 2005 publication Butterflies of West Africa. This species is #1294. The 'Larsen' numbers have since been used with permission in A Sharp Eye on Butterflies of Ghana.
