= Cephetola obscura =

Scientific classification
- Kingdom: Animalia
- Phylum: Arthropoda
- Class: Insecta
- Order: Lepidoptera
- Family: Lycaenidae
- Genus: Cephetola
- Species: C. obscura

Binomial name
- Cephetola obscura (Hawker-Smith, 1933)

Synonyms
- Epitola obscura Hawker-Smith, 1933

Species of butterfly

Cephetola obscura, the obscure epitola, is a butterfly in the family Lycaenidae. It is found in Sierra Leone, Liberia, Ivory Coast, Ghana and western Nigeria. Its habitat consists of forests.
