= Euriphene taigola =

Scientific classification
- Domain: Eukaryota
- Kingdom: Animalia
- Phylum: Arthropoda
- Class: Insecta
- Order: Lepidoptera
- Family: Nymphalidae
- Genus: Euriphene
- Species: E. taigola

Binomial name
- Euriphene taigola Sáfián & Warren-Gash, 2009

Species of butterfly

Euriphene taigola is a butterfly in the family Nymphalidae. It is found in Ivory Coast, Liberia and Sierra Leone. The habitat consists of wet forests.
