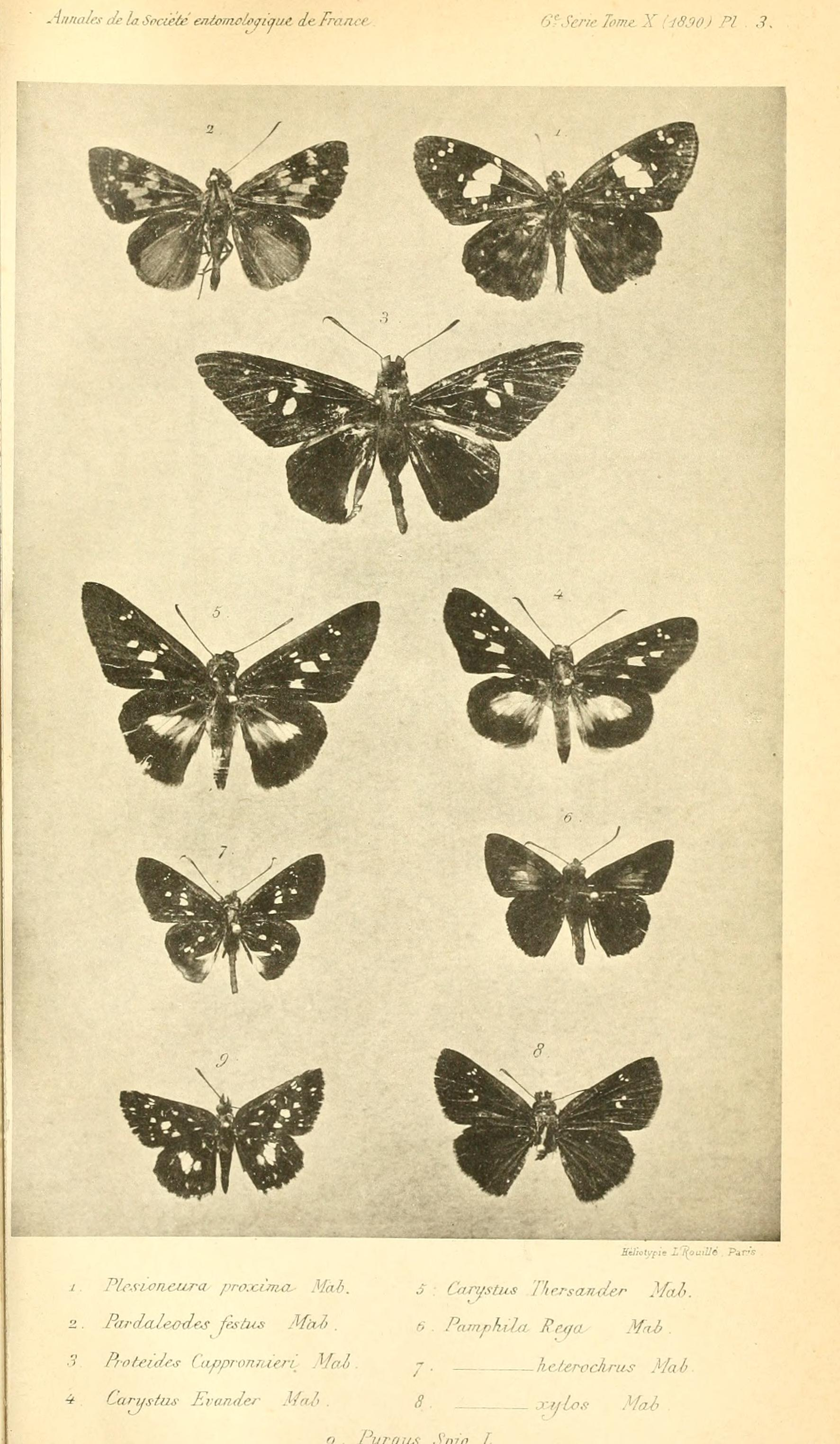

Scientific classification
- Domain: Eukaryota
- Kingdom: Animalia
- Phylum: Arthropoda
- Class: Insecta
- Order: Lepidoptera
- Family: Hesperiidae
- Genus: Gorgyra
- Species: G. heterochrus

Binomial name
- Gorgyra heterochrus (Mabille, 1890)

Synonyms
- Pamphila heterochrus Mabille, 1890

= Gorgyra heterochrus =

Species of butterfly

Gorgyra heterochrus, the white-tufted leaf sitter, is a butterfly in the family Hesperiidae. It is found in Guinea, Sierra Leone, Liberia, Ivory Coast, Ghana, Nigeria, Cameroon and the Central African Republic. The habitat consists of forests.
