= Euphaedra judith =

Scientific classification
- Kingdom: Animalia
- Phylum: Arthropoda
- Class: Insecta
- Order: Lepidoptera
- Family: Nymphalidae
- Genus: Euphaedra
- Species: E. judith

Binomial name
- Euphaedra judith Weymer, 1892

Synonyms
- Euphaedra (Gausapia) judith

Species of butterfly

Euphaedra judith, or Judith's striped forester, is a butterfly in the family Nymphalidae. It is found in Guinea, Sierra Leone, Liberia and western Ivory Coast. The habitat consists of forests.

== Description ==
E. judith Weym. has in the male a triangular green subapical band and a small green hindmarginal spot on the upperside of the forewing and in the female a greenish yellow subapical band and a long yellowish green hindmarginal spot on the forewing. Sierra Leone and Congo Image BOLD
