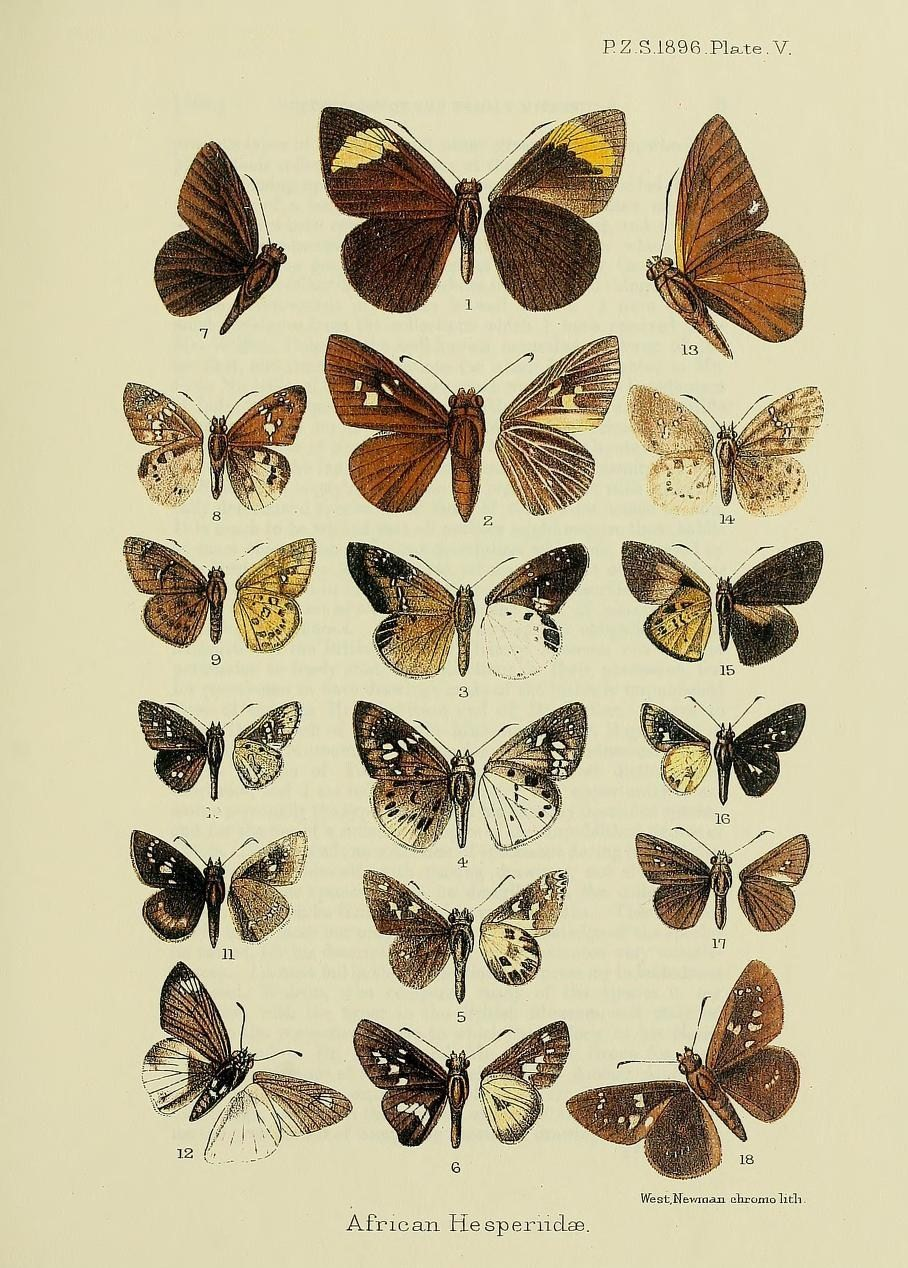
- Gorgyra mocquerysii figure 10

Scientific classification
- Domain: Eukaryota
- Kingdom: Animalia
- Phylum: Arthropoda
- Class: Insecta
- Order: Lepidoptera
- Family: Hesperiidae
- Genus: Gorgyra
- Species: G. mocquerysii

Binomial name
- Gorgyra mocquerysii Holland, 1896

= Gorgyra mocquerysii =

Species of butterfly

Gorgyra mocquerysii, or Mocquery's leaf sitter, is a butterfly in the family Hesperiidae. It is found in Guinea, Sierra Leone, Liberia, Ivory Coast, Ghana, Nigeria, Cameroon, Gabon, the Republic of the Congo, Angola, the Central African Republic, the Democratic Republic of the Congo, Uganda, western Kenya, western Tanzania and northern Zambia. The habitat consists of forests and riparian vegetation.
