= Cigaritis iza =

Black silverline

Scientific classification
- Kingdom: Animalia
- Phylum: Arthropoda
- Clade: Pancrustacea
- Class: Insecta
- Order: Lepidoptera
- Family: Lycaenidae
- Genus: Cigaritis
- Species: C. iza

Binomial name
- Cigaritis iza (Hewitson, 1865)

Synonyms
- Aphnaeus iza Hewitson, 1865; Spindasis iza; Spindasis crustaria mysteriosa Clench, 1965; Aphnaeus lutosus Plötz, 1880

Species of butterfly

Cigaritis iza, the black silverline, is a butterfly in the family Lycaenidae. It is found in Guinea, Sierra Leone, Liberia, Ivory Coast and Ghana. The habitat consists of forests.

Torben Larsen developed a species numbering system for his 2005 publication Butterflies of West Africa. This species is #372. The 'Larsen' numbers have since been used with permission in A Sharp Eye on Butterflies of Ghana.
