= Iolaus leonis =

Scientific classification
- Kingdom: Animalia
- Phylum: Arthropoda
- Class: Insecta
- Order: Lepidoptera
- Family: Lycaenidae
- Genus: Iolaus
- Species: I. leonis

Binomial name
- Iolaus leonis (Riley, 1928)

Synonyms
- Epamera cytaeis leonis Riley, 1928; Iolaus (Epamera) leonis

Species of butterfly

Iolaus leonis, the Sierra Leone sapphire, is a butterfly in the family Lycaenidae. It is found in Guinea, Sierra Leone, Liberia and Ivory Coast. The habitat consists of gallery forests.
