= Pentila petreoides =

Scientific classification
- Kingdom: Animalia
- Phylum: Arthropoda
- Class: Insecta
- Order: Lepidoptera
- Family: Lycaenidae
- Genus: Pentila
- Species: P. petreoides

Binomial name
- Pentila petreoides Bethune-Baker, 1915

Species of butterfly

Pentila petreoides, the western red pentila, is a butterfly in the family Lycaenidae. It is found in Guinea, Sierra Leone, Liberia, Ivory Coast and Ghana. The habitat consists of forests.
