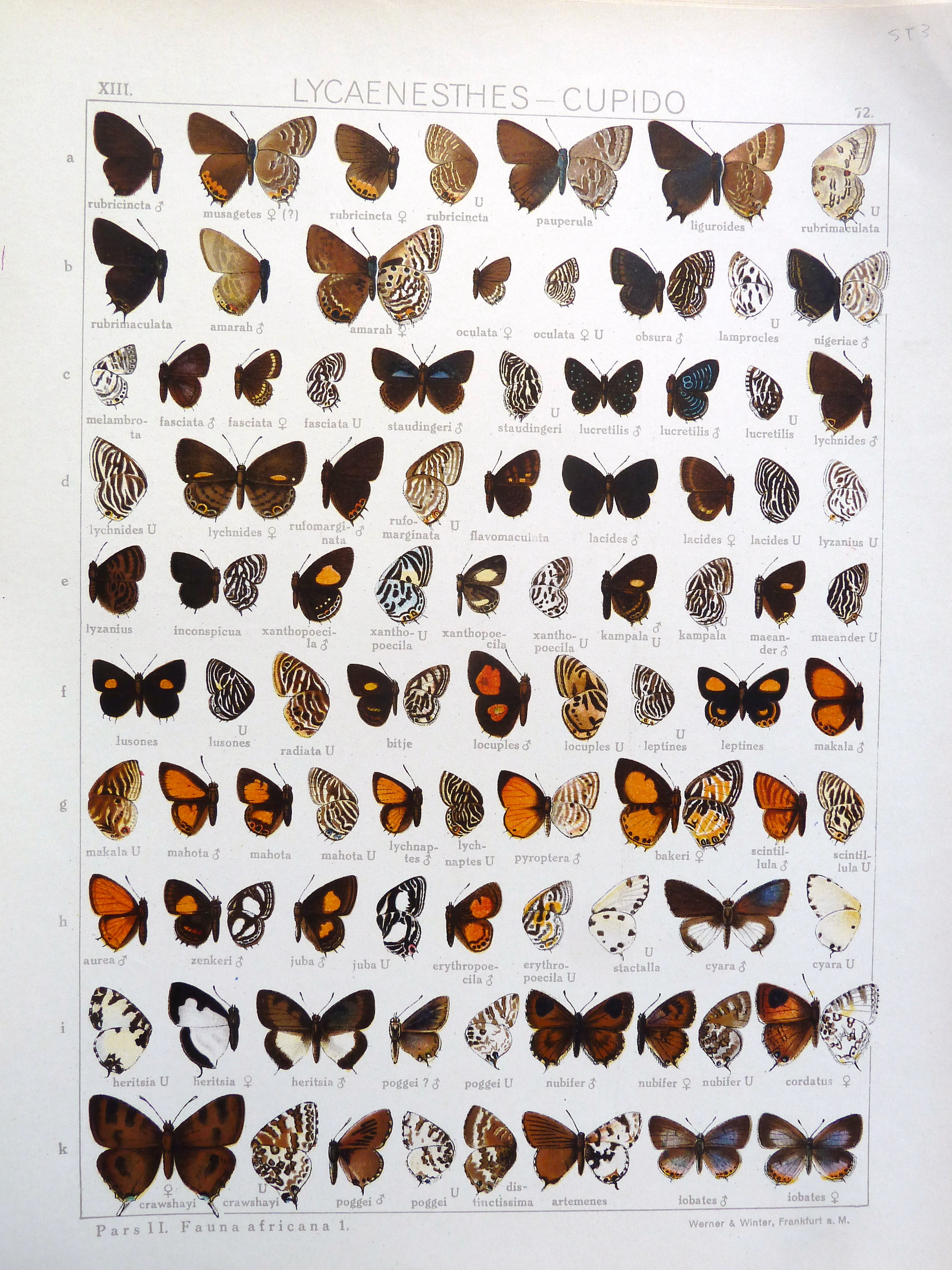

Scientific classification
- Domain: Eukaryota
- Kingdom: Animalia
- Phylum: Arthropoda
- Class: Insecta
- Order: Lepidoptera
- Family: Lycaenidae
- Genus: Anthene
- Species: A. radiata

Binomial name
- Anthene radiata (Bethune-Baker, 1910)

Synonyms
- Lycaenesthes radiata Bethune-Baker, 1910; Anthene (Anthene) radiata

= Anthene radiata =

Red-edged ciliate blue

Species of butterfly

Anthene radiata, the red-edged ciliate blue, is a butterfly in the family Lycaenidae. It is found in Sierra Leone, Liberia, Ivory Coast and Ghana. The habitat consists of moist primary forests.
