= Tetrarhanis diversa =

Scientific classification
- Kingdom: Animalia
- Phylum: Arthropoda
- Class: Insecta
- Order: Lepidoptera
- Family: Lycaenidae
- Genus: Tetrarhanis
- Species: T. diversa

Binomial name
- Tetrarhanis diversa (Bethune-Baker, 1904)

Synonyms
- Liptena diversa Bethune-Baker, 1904

Species of butterfly

Tetrarhanis diversa, the diverse on-off, is a butterfly in the family Lycaenidae. It is found in Guinea, Sierra Leone, Liberia and Ivory Coast. The habitat consists of primary forests.
