= Euphaedra melpomene =

Scarce striped forester

Scientific classification
- Kingdom: Animalia
- Phylum: Arthropoda
- Class: Insecta
- Order: Lepidoptera
- Family: Nymphalidae
- Genus: Euphaedra
- Species: E. melpomene

Binomial name
- Euphaedra melpomene Hecq, 1981

Synonyms
- Euphaedra (Gausapia) melpomene; Euphaedra judith melpomene Hecq, 1981; Euphaedra judith aubergeriana Hecq, 1981

Species of butterfly

Euphaedra melpomene, the scarce striped forester, is a butterfly in the family Nymphalidae. It is found in Guinea, Sierra Leone, Liberia, and Ivory Coast. The habitat consists of forests.

== Subspecies ==
- Euphaedra melpomene melpomene (Sierra Leone, Liberia)
- Euphaedra melpomene aubergeriana Hecq, 1981 (Guinea, western Ivory Coast)
