= List of butterflies of Ivory Coast =

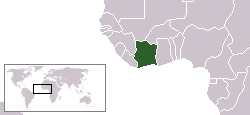
Location of Ivory Coast

This is a list of butterflies of Ivory Coast. About 872 species are known from Ivory Coast, 11 of which are endemic.

== Papilionidae ==
=== Papilioninae ===
==== Papilionini ====
- Papilio antimachus Drury, 1782
- Papilio zalmoxis Hewitson, 1864
- Papilio nireus Linnaeus, 1758
- Papilio chrapkowskoides nurettini Koçak, 1983
- Papilio sosia Rothschild & Jordan, 1903
- Papilio cynorta Fabricius, 1793
- Papilio dardanus Brown, 1776
- Papilio phorcas Cramer, 1775
- Papilio zenobia Fabricius, 1775
- Papilio cyproeofila Butler, 1868
- Papilio demodocus s Esper, [1798]
- Papilio horribilis Butler, 1874
- Papilio menestheus Drury, 1773

==== Leptocercini ====
- Graphium antheus (Cramer, 1779)
- Graphium policenes (Cramer, 1775)
- Graphium liponesco (Suffert, 1904)
- Graphium illyris (Hewitson, 1873)
- Graphium angolanus baronis (Ungemach, 1932)
- Graphium leonidas (Fabricius, 1793)
- Graphium tynderaeus (Fabricius, 1793)
- Graphium latreillianus (Godart, 1819)
- Graphium adamastor (Boisduval, 1836)
- Graphium agamedes (Westwood, 1842)
- Graphium rileyi Berger, 1950

== Pieridae ==
=== Pseudopontiinae ===
- Pseudopontia paradoxa (Felder & Felder, 1869)

=== Coliadinae ===
- Eurema brigitta (Stoll, [1780])
- Eurema desjardinsii marshalli (Butler, 1898)
- Eurema regularis (Butler, 1876)
- Eurema floricola leonis (Butler, 1886)
- Eurema hapale (Mabille, 1882)
- Eurema hecabe solifera (Butler, 1875)
- Eurema senegalensis (Boisduval, 1836)
- Catopsilia florella (Fabricius, 1775)

=== Pierinae ===
- Colotis danae eupompe (Klug, 1829)
- Colotis euippe (Linnaeus, 1758)
- Nepheronia argia (Fabricius, 1775)
- Nepheronia pharis (Boisduval, 1836)
- Nepheronia thalassina (Boisduval, 1836)
- Leptosia alcesta (Stoll, [1782])
- Leptosia hybrida Bernardi, 1952
- Leptosia marginea (Mabille, 1890)
- Leptosia medusa (Cramer, 1777)
- Leptosia wigginsi pseudalcesta Bernardi, 1965

==== Pierini ====
- Appias epaphia (Cramer, [1779])
- Appias phaola (Doubleday, 1847)
- Appias sabina (Felder & Felder, [1865])
- Appias sylvia (Fabricius, 1775)
- Mylothris chloris (Fabricius, 1775)
- Mylothris hilara (Karsch, 1892)
- Mylothris jaopura Karsch, 1893
- Mylothris poppea (Cramer, 1777)
- Mylothris rhodope (Fabricius, 1775)
- Mylothris schumanni Suffert, 1904
- Mylothris dimidiata Aurivillius, 1898
- Dixeia capricornus (Ward, 1871)
- Dixeia cebron (Ward, 1871)
- Belenois aurota (Fabricius, 1793)
- Belenois calypso (Drury, 1773)
- Belenois creona (Cramer, [1776])
- Belenois gidica (Godart, 1819)
- Belenois hedyle rhena (Doubleday, 1846)
- Belenois subeida (Felder & Felder, 1865)
- Belenois theora (Doubleday, 1846)

== Lycaenidae ==
=== Miletinae ===
==== Liphyrini ====
- Euliphyra hewitsoni Aurivillius, 1899
- Euliphyra leucyania (Hewitson, 1874)
- Aslauga lamborni Bethune-Baker, 1914
- Aslauga marginalis Kirby, 1890

==== Miletini ====
- Megalopalpus metaleucus Karsch, 1893
- Megalopalpus zymna (Westwood, 1851)
- Spalgis lemolea lemolea Druce, 1890
- Spalgis lemolea pilos Druce, 1890
- Lachnocnema emperamus (Snellen, 1872)
- Lachnocnema vuattouxi Libert, 1996
- Lachnocnema albimacula Libert, 1996
- Lachnocnema disrupta Talbot, 1935

=== Poritiinae ===
==== Liptenini ====
- Ptelina carnuta (Hewitson, 1873)
- Pentila abraxas (Westwood, 1851)
- Pentila condamini Stempffer, 1963
- Pentila hewitsoni (Grose-Smith & Kirby, 1887)
- Pentila pauli Staudinger, 1888
- Pentila petreia Hewitson, 1874
- Pentila petreoides Bethune-Baker, 1915
- Pentila phidia Hewitson, 1874
- Pentila picena Hewitson, 1874
- Pentila preussi Staudinger, 1888
- Telipna acraea (Westwood, [1851])
- Telipna semirufa (Grose-Smith & Kirby, 1889)
- Ornipholidotos tiassale Stempffer, 1969
- Ornipholidotos sylviae Libert, 2005
- Ornipholidotos onitshae Stempffer, 1962
- Ornipholidotos issia Stempffer, 1969
- Ornipholidotos ivoiriensis Libert, 2005
- Ornipholidotos nympha Libert, 2000
- Ornipholidotos carolinae Libert, 2005
- Torbenia wojtusiaki Libert, 2000
- Mimacraea darwinia Butler, 1872
- Mimacraea neurata Holland, 1895
- Mimeresia cellularis (Kirby, 1890)
- Mimeresia debora catori (Bethune-Baker, 1904)
- Mimeresia issia Stempffer, 1969
- Mimeresia libentina (Hewitson, 1866)
- Mimeresia moyambina (Bethune-Baker, 1904)
- Mimeresia semirufa (Grose-Smith, 1902)
- Liptena albicans Cator, 1904
- Liptena alluaudi Mabille, 1890
- Liptena catalina (Grose-Smith & Kirby, 1887)
- Liptena evanescens (Kirby, 1887)
- Liptena ferrymani bigoti Stempffer, 1964
- Liptena flavicans oniens Talbot, 1935
- Liptena griveaudi Stempffer, 1969
- Liptena helena (Druce, 1888)
- Liptena praestans (Grose-Smith, 1901)
- Liptena bia Larsen & Warren-Gash, 2008
- Liptena septistrigata (Bethune-Baker, 1903)
- Liptena seyboui Warren-Gash & Larsen, 2003
- Liptena similis (Kirby, 1890)
- Liptena simplicia Möschler, 1887
- Liptena submacula liberiana Stempffer, Bennett & May, 1974
- Liptena submacula tringa Stempffer, Bennett & May, 1974
- Liptena tiassale Stempffer, 1969
- Liptena titei Stempffer, Bennett & May, 1974
- Liptena xanthostola coomassiensis Hawker-Smith, 1933
- Kakumia otlauga (Grose-Smith & Kirby, 1890)
- Tetrarhanis baralingam (Larsen, 1998)
- Tetrarhanis diversa (Bethune-Baker, 1904)
- Tetrarhanis symplocus Clench, 1965
- Falcuna campimus (Holland, 1890)
- Falcuna leonensis Stempffer & Bennett, 1963
- Larinopoda eurema (Plötz, 1880)
- Micropentila adelgitha (Hewitson, 1874)
- Micropentila brunnea (Kirby, 1887)
- Micropentila dorothea Bethune-Baker, 1903
- Micropentila mabangi Bethune-Baker, 1904
- Micropentila mamfe Larsen, 1986
- Pseuderesia eleaza (Hewitson, 1873)
- Eresina fontainei Stempffer, 1956
- Eresina fusca (Cator, 1904)
- Eresina jacksoni Stempffer, 1961
- Eresina maesseni Stempffer, 1956
- Eresina pseudofusca Stempffer, 1961
- Eresina rougeoti Stempffer, 1956
- Eresina saundersi Stempffer, 1956
- Eresina theodori Stempffer, 1956
- Eresiomera bicolor (Grose-Smith & Kirby, 1890)
- Eresiomera isca occidentalis Collins & Larsen, 1998
- Eresiomera jacksoni (Stempffer, 1969)
- Eresiomera petersi (Stempffer & Bennett, 1956)
- Citrinophila erastus (Hewitson, 1866)
- Citrinophila marginalis Kirby, 1887
- Citrinophila similis (Kirby, 1887)
- Argyrocheila undifera Staudinger, 1892

==== Epitolini ====
- Iridana incredibilis (Staudinger, 1891)
- Iridana nigeriana Stempffer, 1964
- Iridana rougeoti Stempffer, 1964
- Epitola posthumus (Fabricius, 1793)
- Epitola urania Kirby, 1887
- Epitola uranioides occidentalis Libert, 1999
- Cerautola ceraunia (Hewitson, 1873)
- Cerautola crowleyi (Sharpe, 1890)
- Geritola albomaculata (Bethune-Baker, 1903)
- Geritola gerina (Hewitson, 1878)
- Geritola virginea (Bethune-Baker, 1904)
- Geritola subargentea continua Libert, 1999
- Stempfferia baoule Libert, 1999
- Stempfferia ciconia (Grose-Smith & Kirby, 1892)
- Stempfferia dorothea (Bethune-Baker, 1904)
- Stempfferia kholifa (Bethune-Baker, 1904)
- Stempfferia leonina (Staudinger, 1888)
- Stempfferia michelae Libert, 1999
- Stempfferia moyambina (Bethune-Baker, 1903)
- Stempfferia staudingeri (Kirby, 1890)
- Stempfferia zelza (Hewitson, 1873)
- Cephetola cephena (Hewitson, 1873)
- Cephetola collinsi Libert & Larsen, 1999
- Cephetola maculata (Hawker-Smith, 1926)
- Cephetola maesseni Libert, 1999
- Cephetola mercedes ivoriensis (Jackson, 1967)
- Cephetola nigra (Bethune-Baker, 1903)
- Cephetola obscura (Hawker-Smith, 1933)
- Cephetola pinodes (Druce, 1890)
- Cephetola subcoerulea (Roche, 1954)
- Cephetola sublustris (Bethune-Baker, 1904)
- Neaveia lamborni Druce, 1910
- Epitolina dispar (Kirby, 1887)
- Epitolina melissa (Druce, 1888)
- Epitolina catori Bethune-Baker, 1904
- Hypophytala benitensis (Holland, 1890)
- Hypophytala henleyi (Kirby, 1890)
- Hypophytala hyettina (Aurivillius, 1897)
- Hypophytala hyettoides (Aurivillius, 1895)
- Phytala elais elais Westwood, 1851
- Phytala elais catori Bethune-Baker, 1903
- Aethiopana honorius divisa (Butler, 1901)
- Hewitsonia boisduvalii (Hewitson, 1869)
- Hewitsonia danane Stempffer, 1969
- Hewitsonia inexpectata Bouyer, 1997
- Hewitsonia occidentalis Bouyer, 1997

=== Aphnaeinae ===
- Pseudaletis agrippina warrengashi Libert, 2007
- Pseudaletis zebra subangulata Talbot, 1935
- Pseudaletis leonis (Staudinger, 1888)
- Pseudaletis richardi Stempffer, 1952
- Lipaphnaeus aderna (Plötz, 1880)
- Lipaphnaeus leonina ivoirensis Stempffer, 1966
- Cigaritis iza (Hewitson, 1865)
- Cigaritis menelas (Druce, 1907)
- Cigaritis mozambica (Bertoloni, 1850)
- Zeritis neriene Boisduval, 1836
- Axiocerses harpax (Fabricius, 1775)
- Axiocerses amanga borealis Aurivillius, 1905
- Aphnaeus argyrocyclus Holland, 1890
- Aphnaeus asterius Plötz, 1880
- Aphnaeus gilloni Stempffer, 1966
- Aphnaeus orcas (Drury, 1782)

=== Theclinae ===
- Myrina silenus (Fabricius, 1775)
- Oxylides faunus (Drury, 1773)
- Dapidodigma demeter Clench, 1961
- Dapidodigma hymen (Fabricius, 1775)
- Hypolycaena anara Larsen, 1986
- Hypolycaena antifaunus (Westwood, 1851)
- Hypolycaena clenchi Larsen, 1997
- Hypolycaena dubia Aurivillius, 1895
- Hypolycaena hatita Hewitson, 1865
- Hypolycaena kakumi Larsen, 1997
- Hypolycaena lebona (Hewitson, 1865)
- Hypolycaena liara Druce, 1890
- Hypolycaena nigra Bethune-Baker, 1914
- Hypolycaena philippus (Fabricius, 1793)
- Hypolycaena scintillans Stempffer, 1957
- Iolaus eurisus (Cramer, 1779)
- Iolaus aethria Karsch, 1893
- Iolaus alienus bicaudatus Aurivillius, 1905
- Iolaus banco Stempffer, 1966
- Iolaus bellina (Plötz, 1880)
- Iolaus leonis (Riley, 1928)
- Iolaus iasis Hewitson, 1865
- Iolaus laon Hewitson, 1878
- Iolaus longicauda haydoni Collins & Larsen, 2000
- Iolaus maesa (Hewitson, 1862)
- Iolaus pollux oberthueri (Riley, 1929)
- Iolaus sappirus (Druce, 1902)
- Iolaus scintillans Aurivillius, 1905
- Iolaus menas Druce, 1890
- Iolaus carolinae Collins & Larsen, 2000
- Iolaus alexanderi Warren-Gash, 2003
- Iolaus iulus Hewitson, 1869
- Iolaus ismenias (Klug, 1834)
- Iolaus alcibiades Kirby, 1871
- Iolaus paneperata Druce, 1890
- Iolaus lukabas Druce, 1890
- Iolaus calisto (Westwood, 1851)
- Iolaus laonides Aurivillius, 1898
- Iolaus timon (Fabricius, 1787)
- Iolaus catori Bethune-Baker, 1904
- Iolaus kyabobo Larsen, 1996
- Stugeta marmoreus (Butler, 1866)
- Pilodeudorix virgata (Druce, 1891)
- Pilodeudorix hamidou Libert, 2004
- Pilodeudorix catori (Bethune-Baker, 1903)
- Pilodeudorix leonina (Bethune-Baker, 1904)
- Pilodeudorix mera (Hewitson, 1873)
- Pilodeudorix otraeda (Hewitson, 1863)
- Pilodeudorix caerulea (Druce, 1890)
- Pilodeudorix camerona (Plötz, 1880)
- Pilodeudorix diyllus (Hewitson, 1878)
- Pilodeudorix zela (Hewitson, 1869)
- Pilodeudorix aucta (Karsch, 1895)
- Pilodeudorix aurivilliusi (Stempffer, 1954)
- Pilodeudorix corruscans kakumi (Larsen, 1994)
- Pilodeudorix kiellandi (Congdon & Collins, 1998)
- Pilodeudorix laticlavia (Clench, 1965)
- Pilodeudorix violetta (Aurivillius, 1897)
- Paradeudorix eleala viridis (Stempffer, 1964)
- Paradeudorix moyambina (Bethune-Baker, 1904)
- Paradeudorix petersi (Stempffer & Bennett, 1956)
- Hypomyrina mimetica Libert, 2004
- Deudorix antalus (Hopffer, 1855)
- Deudorix caliginosa Lathy, 1903
- Deudorix dinochares Grose-Smith, 1887
- Deudorix dinomenes diomedes Jackson, 1966
- Deudorix galathea (Swainson, 1821)
- Deudorix kayonza Stempffer, 1956
- Deudorix lorisona (Hewitson, 1862)
- Deudorix odana Druce, 1887

=== Polyommatinae ===
==== Lycaenesthini ====
- Anthene amarah (Guérin-Méneville, 1849)
- Anthene atewa Larsen & Collins, 1998
- Anthene crawshayi (Butler, 1899)
- Anthene definita (Butler, 1899)
- Anthene helpsi Larsen, 1994
- Anthene irumu (Stempffer, 1948)
- Anthene juba (Fabricius, 1787)
- Anthene lachares (Hewitson, 1878)
- Anthene larydas (Cramer, 1780)
- Anthene liodes (Hewitson, 1874)
- Anthene lunulata (Trimen, 1894)
- Anthene lysicles (Hewitson, 1874)
- Anthene mahota (Grose-Smith, 1887)
- Anthene princeps (Butler, 1876)
- Anthene radiata (Bethune-Baker, 1910)
- Anthene rubricinctus (Holland, 1891)
- Anthene scintillula aurea (Bethune-Baker, 1910)
- Anthene starki Larsen, 2005
- Anthene sylvanus (Drury, 1773)
- Anthene lyzanius (Hewitson, 1874)
- Anthene chryseostictus (Bethune-Baker, 1910)
- Anthene fulvus Stempffer, 1962
- Anthene lusones fulvimacula (Mabille, 1890)
- Anthene fasciatus (Aurivillius, 1895)
- Anthene hades (Bethune-Baker, 1910)
- Anthene inconspicua (Druce, 1910)
- Anthene lamias (Hewitson, 1878)
- Anthene lucretilis (Hewitson, 1874)
- Anthene nigeriae (Aurivillius, 1905)
- Anthene phoenicis (Karsch, 1893)
- Anthene rufoplagata (Bethune-Baker, 1910)
- Cupidesthes jacksoni Stempffer, 1969
- Cupidesthes leonina (Bethune-Baker, 1903)
- Cupidesthes lithas (Druce, 1890)
- Cupidesthes mimetica (Druce, 1910)

==== Polyommatini ====
- Cupidopsis cissus (Godart, [1824])
- Cupidopsis jobates mauritanica Riley, 1932
- Pseudonacaduba sichela (Wallengren, 1857)
- Lampides boeticus (Linnaeus, 1767)
- Uranothauma belcastroi Larsen, 1997
- Uranothauma falkensteini (Dewitz, 1879)
- Phlyaria cyara stactalla Karsch, 1895
- Cacyreus audeoudi Stempffer, 1936
- Cacyreus lingeus (Stoll, 1782)
- Leptotes babaulti (Stempffer, 1935)
- Leptotes pirithous (Linnaeus, 1767)
- Tuxentius carana kontu (Karsch, 1893)
- Tarucus kiki Larsen, 1976
- Tarucus legrasi Stempffer, 1948
- Tarucus rosacea (Austaut, 1885)
- Zizeeria knysna (Trimen, 1862)
- Actizera lucida (Trimen, 1883)
- Zizula hylax (Fabricius, 1775)
- Azanus mirza (Plötz, 1880)
- Azanus moriqua (Wallengren, 1857)
- Azanus isis (Drury, 1773)
- Eicochrysops hippocrates (Fabricius, 1793)
- Euchrysops albistriata greenwoodi d'Abrera, 1980
- Euchrysops barkeri (Trimen, 1893)
- Euchrysops malathana (Boisduval, 1833)
- Euchrysops osiris (Hopffer, 1855)
- Euchrysops reducta Hulstaert, 1924
- Thermoniphas micylus (Cramer, 1780)
- Oboronia guessfeldti (Dewitz, 1879)
- Oboronia liberiana Stempffer, 1950
- Oboronia ornata (Mabille, 1890)
- Oboronia punctatus (Dewitz, 1879)
- Freyeria trochylus (Freyer, [1843])
- Lepidochrysops parsimon (Fabricius, 1775)
- Lepidochrysops quassi (Karsh, 1895)
- Lepidochrysops synchrematiza (Bethune-Baker, [1923])

== Riodinidae ==
=== Nemeobiinae ===
- Abisara tantalus (Hewitson, 1861)
- Abisara gerontes (Fabricius, 1781)

== Nymphalidae ==
=== Libytheinae ===
- Libythea labdaca Westwood, 1851

=== Danainae ===
==== Danaini ====
- Danaus chrysippus alcippus (Cramer, 1777)
- Tirumala petiverana (Doubleday, 1847)
- Amauris niavius (Linnaeus, 1758)
- Amauris tartarea Mabille, 1876
- Amauris damocles (Fabricius, 1793)
- Amauris hecate (Butler, 1866)

=== Satyrinae ===
==== Elymniini ====
- Elymniopsis bammakoo (Westwood, [1851])

==== Melanitini ====
- Gnophodes betsimena parmeno Doubleday, 1849
- Gnophodes chelys (Fabricius, 1793)
- Melanitis ansorgei Rothschild, 1904
- Melanitis leda (Linnaeus, 1758)
- Melanitis libya Distant, 1882

==== Satyrini ====
- Bicyclus abnormis (Dudgeon, 1909)
- Bicyclus angulosa (Butler, 1868)
- Bicyclus auricruda (Butler, 1868)
- Bicyclus campus (Karsch, 1893)
- Bicyclus dekeyseri (Condamin, 1958)
- Bicyclus dorothea (Cramer, 1779)
- Bicyclus ephorus Weymer, 1892
- Bicyclus evadne evadne (Cramer, 1779)
- Bicyclus evadne elionias (Hewitson, 1866)
- Bicyclus hyperanthus (Bethune-Baker, 1908)
- Bicyclus ignobilis (Butler, 1870)
- Bicyclus istaris (Plötz, 1880)
- Bicyclus madetes (Hewitson, 1874)
- Bicyclus maesseni Condamin, 1971
- Bicyclus mandanes Hewitson, 1873
- Bicyclus milyas (Hewitson, 1864)
- Bicyclus nobilis (Aurivillius, 1893)
- Bicyclus pavonis (Butler, 1876)
- Bicyclus procora (Karsch, 1893)
- Bicyclus safitza (Westwood, 1850)
- Bicyclus sambulos unicolor Condamin, 1971
- Bicyclus martius (Fabricius, 1793)
- Bicyclus sandace (Hewitson, 1877)
- Bicyclus sangmelinae Condamin, 1963
- Bicyclus taenias (Hewitson, 1877)
- Bicyclus trilophus jacksoni Condamin, 1961
- Bicyclus vulgaris (Butler, 1868)
- Bicyclus xeneas occidentalis Condamin, 1965
- Bicyclus zinebi (Butler, 1869)
- Hallelesis halyma (Fabricius, 1793)
- Heteropsis elisi (Karsch, 1893)
- Heteropsis peitho (Plötz, 1880)
- Ypthima antennata cornesi Kielland, 1982
- Ypthima asterope (Klug, 1832)
- Ypthima doleta Kirby, 1880
- Ypthima impura Elwes & Edwards, 1893
- Ypthima lamto Kielland, 1982
- Ypthima pupillaris Butler, 1888
- Ypthima vuattouxi Kielland, 1982
- Ypthimomorpha itonia (Hewitson, 1865)

=== Charaxinae ===
==== Charaxini ====
- Charaxes varanes vologeses (Mabille, 1876)
- Charaxes fulvescens senegala van Someren, 1975
- Charaxes candiope (Godart, 1824)
- Charaxes protoclea Feisthamel, 1850
- Charaxes boueti Feisthamel, 1850
- Charaxes cynthia Butler, 1866
- Charaxes lucretius Cramer, [1775]
- Charaxes lactetinctus Karsch, 1892
- Charaxes jasius Poulton, 1926
- Charaxes epijasius Reiche, 1850
- Charaxes castor (Cramer, 1775)
- Charaxes brutus (Cramer, 1779)
- Charaxes pollux (Cramer, 1775)
- Charaxes eudoxus (Drury, 1782)
- Charaxes numenes (Hewitson, 1859)
- Charaxes tiridates (Cramer, 1777)
- Charaxes bipunctatus Rothschild, 1894
- Charaxes smaragdalis butleri Rothschild, 1900
- Charaxes imperialis Butler, 1874
- Charaxes ameliae doumeti Henning, 1989
- Charaxes pythodoris davidi Plantrou, 1973
- Charaxes hadrianus Ward, 1871
- Charaxes nobilis claudei le Moult, 1933
- Charaxes fournierae jolybouyeri Vingerhoedt, 1998
- Charaxes zingha (Stoll, 1780)
- Charaxes etesipe (Godart, 1824)
- Charaxes achaemenes atlantica van Someren, 1970
- Charaxes eupale (Drury, 1782)
- Charaxes subornatus couilloudi Plantrou, 1976
- Charaxes anticlea (Drury, 1782)
- Charaxes hildebrandti gillesi Plantrou, 1973
- Charaxes virilis van Someren & Jackson, 1952
- Charaxes etheocles (Cramer, 1777)
- Charaxes bocqueti Minig, 1975
- Charaxes viola Butler, 1866
- Charaxes northcotti Rothschild, 1899
- Charaxes pleione (Godart, 1824)
- Charaxes paphianus falcata (Butler, 1872)
- Charaxes nichetes bouchei Plantrou, 1974
- Charaxes nichetes leopardinus Plantrou, 1974
- Charaxes lycurgus (Fabricius, 1793)
- Charaxes zelica Butler, 1869
- Charaxes porthos gallayi van Someren, 1968
- Charaxes doubledayi Aurivillius, 1899
- Charaxes mycerina (Godart, 1824)

==== Euxanthini ====
- Charaxes eurinome (Cramer, 1775)

==== Pallini ====
- Palla publius Staudinger, 1892
- Palla ussheri (Butler, 1870)
- Palla decius (Cramer, 1777)
- Palla violinitens (Crowley, 1890)

=== Apaturinae ===
- Apaturopsis cleochares (Hewitson, 1873)

=== Nymphalinae ===
- Kallimoides rumia (Doubleday, 1849)
- Vanessula milca angustifascia Joicey & Talbot, 1928

==== Nymphalini ====
- Antanartia delius (Drury, 1782)
- Junonia chorimene (Guérin-Méneville, 1844)
- Junonia hierta cebrene Trimen, 1870
- Junonia oenone (Linnaeus, 1758)
- Junonia orithya madagascariensis Guenée, 1865
- Junonia sophia (Fabricius, 1793)
- Junonia stygia (Aurivillius, 1894)
- Junonia terea (Drury, 1773)
- Junonia westermanni Westwood, 1870
- Junonia cymodoce (Cramer, 1777)
- Salamis cacta (Fabricius, 1793)
- Protogoniomorpha anacardii (Linnaeus, 1758)
- Protogoniomorpha parhassus (Drury, 1782)
- Protogoniomorpha cytora (Doubleday, 1847)
- Precis antilope (Feisthamel, 1850)
- Precis ceryne ceruana Rothschild & Jordan, 190
- Precis pelarga (Fabricius, 1775)
- Precis sinuata Plötz, 1880
- Hypolimnas anthedon (Doubleday, 1845)
- Hypolimnas aubergeri Hecq, 1987
- Hypolimnas dinarcha (Hewitson, 1865)
- Hypolimnas misippus (Linnaeus, 1764)
- Hypolimnas salmacis (Drury, 1773)
- Catacroptera cloanthe ligata Rothschild & Jordan, 1903

=== Cyrestinae ===
==== Cyrestini ====
- Cyrestis camillus (Fabricius, 1781)

=== Biblidinae ===
==== Biblidini ====
- Byblia anvatara crameri Aurivillius, 1894
- Mesoxantha ethosea (Drury, 1782)
- Ariadne albifascia (Joicey & Talbot, 1921)
- Ariadne enotrea (Cramer, 1779)
- Neptidopsis ophione (Cramer, 1777)
- Eurytela dryope (Cramer, [1775])
- Eurytela hiarbas (Drury, 1782)

==== Epicaliini ====
- Sevenia boisduvali omissa (Rothschild, 1918)
- Sevenia occidentalium (Mabille, 1876)
- Sevenia umbrina (Karsch, 1892)

=== Limenitinae ===
==== Limenitidini ====
- Harma theobene Doubleday, 1848
- Cymothoe althea (Cramer, 1776)
- Cymothoe aubergeri Plantrou, 1977
- Cymothoe caenis (Drury, 1773)
- Cymothoe coccinata (Hewitson, 1874)
- Cymothoe egesta (Cramer, 1775)
- Cymothoe fumana (Westwood, 1850)
- Cymothoe hartigi vanessae Warren-Gash, 2003
- Cymothoe herminia gongoa Fox, 1965
- Cymothoe jodutta (Westwood, 1850)
- Cymothoe lurida (Butler, 1871)
- Cymothoe mabillei Overlaet, 1944
- Cymothoe sangaris (Godart, 1824)
- Cymothoe weymeri mulatta Belcastro, 1990
- Pseudoneptis bugandensis ianthe Hemming, 1964
- Pseudacraea boisduvalii (Doubleday, 1845)
- Pseudacraea eurytus (Linnaeus, 1758)
- Pseudacraea hostilia (Drury, 1782)
- Pseudacraea lucretia (Cramer, [1775])
- Pseudacraea semire (Cramer, 1779)
- Pseudacraea warburgi Aurivillius, 1892

==== Neptidini ====
- Neptis agouale Pierre-Baltus, 1978
- Neptis alta Overlaet, 1955
- Neptis loma Condamin, 1971
- Neptis najo Karsch, 1893
- Neptis kiriakoffi Overlaet, 1955
- Neptis melicerta (Drury, 1773)
- Neptis metella (Doubleday, 1848)
- Neptis mixophyes Holland, 1892
- Neptis morosa Overlaet, 1955
- Neptis nebrodes Hewitson, 1874
- Neptis nemetes Hewitson, 1868
- Neptis nicobule Holland, 1892
- Neptis quintilla Mabille, 1890
- Neptis nicoteles Hewitson, 1874
- Neptis viridis Pierre-Baltus, 2007
- Neptis lamtoensis Pierre-Baltus, 2007
- Neptis paula Staudinger, 1896
- Neptis puella Aurivillius, 1894
- Neptis seeldrayersi Aurivillius, 1895
- Neptis strigata Aurivillius, 1894
- Neptis trigonophora melicertula Strand, 1912
- Neptis troundi Pierre-Baltus, 1978
- Neptis vindo Pierre-Baltus, 1978

==== Adoliadini ====
- Catuna angustatum (Felder & Felder, 1867)
- Catuna crithea (Drury, 1773)
- Catuna niji Fox, 1965
- Catuna oberthueri Karsch, 1894
- Euryphura chalcis (Felder & Felder, 1860)
- Euryphura togoensis Suffert, 1904
- Euryphurana nobilis (Staudinger, 1891)
- Hamanumida daedalus (Fabricius, 1775)
- Aterica galene (Brown, 1776)
- Cynandra opis (Drury, 1773)
- Euriphene amicia amicia (Hewitson, 1871)
- Euriphene amicia gola Fox, 1965
- Euriphene ampedusa (Hewitson, 1866)
- Euriphene aridatha (Hewitson, 1866)
- Euriphene taigola Sáfián & Warren-Gash, 2009
- Euriphene aridatha feronia (Staudinger, 1891)
- Euriphene aridatha transgressa Hecq, 1994
- Euriphene atossa (Hewitson, 1865)
- Euriphene barombina (Aurivillius, 1894)
- Euriphene batesana Bethune-Baker, 1926
- Euriphene coerulea Boisduval, 1847
- Euriphene ernestibaumanni (Karsch, 1895)
- Euriphene gambiae vera Hecq, 2002
- Euriphene grosesmithi muehlenbergi Hecq, 1995
- Euriphene incerta (Aurivillius, 1912)
- Euriphene leonis (Aurivillius, 1899)
- Euriphene lomaensis Belcastro, 1986
- Euriphene simplex (Staudinger, 1891)
- Euriphene veronica (Stoll, 1780)
- Euriphene doriclea (Drury, 1782)
- Bebearia lucayensis Hecq, 1996
- Bebearia tentyris (Hewitson, 1866)
- Bebearia osyris (Schultze, 1920)
- Bebearia dallastai Hecq, 1994
- Bebearia carshena (Hewitson, 1871)
- Bebearia absolon (Fabricius, 1793)
- Bebearia zonara (Butler, 1871)
- Bebearia mandinga (Felder & Felder, 1860)
- Bebearia oxione (Hewitson, 1866)
- Bebearia abesa (Hewitson, 1869)
- Bebearia barce (Doubleday, 1847)
- Bebearia mardania (Fabricius, 1793)
- Bebearia cocalia (Fabricius, 1793)
- Bebearia paludicola blandi Holmes, 2001
- Bebearia senegalensis (Herrich-Schaeffer, 1858)
- Bebearia sophus (Fabricius, 1793)
- Bebearia arcadius (Fabricius, 1793)
- Bebearia laetitia (Plötz, 1880)
- Bebearia phantasina (Staudinger, 1891)
- Bebearia demetra (Godart, 1824)
- Bebearia warrengashi Hecq, 2000
- Bebearia inepta Hecq, 2001
- Bebearia maledicta (Strand, 1912)
- Bebearia ashantina (Dudgeon, 1913)
- Bebearia cutteri (Hewitson, 1865)
- Euphaedra aubergeri Hecq, 1977
- Euphaedra medon (Linnaeus, 1763)
- Euphaedra gausape (Butler, 1866)
- Euphaedra judith Weymer, 1892
- Euphaedra melpomene aubergeriana Hecq, 1981
- Euphaedra mariaechristinae Hecq & Joly, 2003
- Euphaedra plantroui Hecq, 1981
- Euphaedra xypete (Hewitson, 1865)
- Euphaedra hebes Hecq, 1980
- Euphaedra diffusa albocoerulea Hecq, 1976
- Euphaedra crockeri umbratilis Hecq, 1987
- Euphaedra eusemoides (Grose-Smith & Kirby, 1889)
- Euphaedra cyparissa cyparissa (Cramer, 1775)
- Euphaedra cyparissa aurantina Pyrcz & Oremans, 2013
- Euphaedra cyparissa aurata Carpenter, 1895
- Euphaedra cyparissa tai Hecq, 1986
- Euphaedra sarcoptera sarcoptera (Butler, 1871)
- Euphaedra sarcoptera styx Larsen & Warren-Gash, 2003
- Euphaedra themis (Hübner, 1807)
- Euphaedra laboureana eburnensis Hecq, 1979
- Euphaedra modesta Hecq, 1982
- Euphaedra minuta Hecq, 1982
- Euphaedra laguerrei Hecq, 1979
- Euphaedra janetta (Butler, 1871)
- Euphaedra vetusta (Butler, 1871)
- Euphaedra ceres (Fabricius, 1775)
- Euphaedra inanum (Butler, 1873)
- Euphaedra phaethusa (Butler, 1866)
- Euphaedra delera Hecq, 1989
- Euphaedra ravola (Hewitson, 1866)
- Euphaedra tenebrosa Hecq, 1983
- Euphaedra francina exuberans Collins & Larsen, 2005
- Euphaedra eleus (Drury, 1782)
- Euphaedra zampa (Westwood, 1850)
- Euphaedra edwardsii (van der Hoeven, 1845)
- Euphaedra perseis (Drury, 1773)
- Euphaedra harpalyce (Cramer, 1777)
- Euphaedra eupalus (Fabricius, 1781)
- Euphaedra viridirupta Hecq, 2007
- Euptera crowleyi (Kirby, 1889)
- Euptera dorothea warrengashi Libert, 2002
- Euptera elabontas (Hewitson, 1871)
- Euptera zowa Fox, 1965
- Pseudathyma falcata Jackson, 1969
- Pseudathyma martini Collins, 2002
- Pseudathyma plutonica sibyllina (Staudinger, 1890)

=== Heliconiinae ===
==== Acraeini ====
- Acraea camaena (Drury, 1773)
- Acraea endoscota Le Doux, 1928
- Acraea leucographa Ribbe, 1889
- Acraea neobule Doubleday, 1847
- Acraea quirina (Fabricius, 1781)
- Acraea zetes (Linnaeus, 1758)
- Acraea abdera eginopsis Aurivillius, 1899
- Acraea egina (Cramer, 1775)
- Acraea caecilia (Fabricius, 1781)
- Acraea pseudegina Westwood, 1852
- Acraea rogersi Hewitson, 1873
- Acraea alcinoe Felder & Felder, 1865
- Acraea consanguinea sartina (Jordan, 1910)
- Acraea epaea (Cramer, 1779)
- Acraea macaria (Fabricius, 1793)
- Acraea umbra (Drury, 1782)
- Acraea vestalis Felder & Felder, 1865
- Acraea acerata Hewitson, 1874
- Acraea alciope Hewitson, 1852
- Acraea pseudepaea Dudgeon, 1909
- Acraea aurivillii Staudinger, 1896
- Acraea bonasia (Fabricius, 1775)
- Acraea circeis (Drury, 1782)
- Acraea encedana Pierre, 1976
- Acraea encedon (Linnaeus, 1758)
- Acraea serena (Fabricius, 1775)
- Acraea jodutta (Fabricius, 1793)
- Acraea lycoa Godart, 1819
- Acraea orestia Hewitson, 1874
- Acraea peneleos Ward, 1871
- Acraea polis Pierre, 1999
- Acraea pharsalus Ward, 1871
- Acraea vesperalis Grose-Smith, 1890
- Acraea orina Hewitson, 1874
- Acraea parrhasia (Fabricius, 1793)
- Acraea translucida Eltringham, 1912
- Acraea perenna Doubleday, 1847

==== Vagrantini ====
- Lachnoptera anticlia (Hübner, 1819)
- Phalanta eurytis (Doubleday, 1847)
- Phalanta phalantha aethiopica (Rothschild & Jordan, 1903)

== Hesperiidae ==
=== Coeliadinae ===
- Coeliades bixana Evans, 1940
- Coeliades chalybe (Westwood, 1852)
- Coeliades forestan (Stoll, [1782])
- Coeliades hanno (Plötz, 1879)
- Coeliades libeon (Druce, 1875)
- Coeliades pisistratus (Fabricius, 1793)
- Pyrrhiades lucagus (Cramer, 1777)
- Pyrrhochalcia iphis (Drury, 1773)

=== Pyrginae ===
==== Celaenorrhinini ====
- Loxolexis hollandi (Druce, 1909)
- Loxolexis holocausta (Mabille, 1891)
- Katreus johnstoni (Butler, 1888)
- Celaenorrhinus galenus (Fabricius, 1793)
- Celaenorrhinus leona Berger, 1975
- Celaenorrhinus meditrina (Hewitson, 1877)
- Celaenorrhinus nimba Collins & Larsen, 2000
- Celaenorrhinus ovalis Evans, 1937
- Celaenorrhinus plagiatus Berger, 1976
- Celaenorrhinus proxima maesseni Berger, 1976
- Celaenorrhinus rutilans (Mabille, 1877)
- Eretis lugens (Rogenhofer, 1891)
- Eretis melania Mabille, 1891
- Eretis plistonicus (Plötz, 1879)
- Sarangesa bouvieri (Mabille, 1877)
- Sarangesa brigida (Plötz, 1879)
- Sarangesa laelius (Mabille, 1877)
- Sarangesa majorella (Mabille, 1891)
- Sarangesa tertullianus (Fabricius, 1793)
- Sarangesa thecla (Plötz, 1879)
- Aurina dina Evans, 1937

==== Tagiadini ====
- Tagiades flesus (Fabricius, 1781)
- Eagris decastigma Mabille, 1891
- Eagris denuba (Plötz, 1879)
- Eagris hereus quaterna (Mabille, 1890)
- Eagris subalbida (Holland, 1893)
- Eagris tetrastigma subolivescens (Holland, 1892)
- Eagris tigris liberti Collins & Larsen, 2005
- Calleagris lacteus dannatti (Ehrmann, 1893)
- Calleagris landbecki (Druce, 1910)
- Procampta rara Holland, 1892
- Abantis bismarcki Karsch, 1892
- Abantis elegantula (Mabille, 1890)
- Abantis ja Druce, 1909
- Abantis leucogaster (Mabille, 1890)

==== Carcharodini ====
- Spialia diomus (Hopffer, 1855)
- Spialia dromus (Plötz, 1884)
- Spialia ploetzi occidentalis de Jong, 1977
- Spialia spio (Linnaeus, 1764)
- Gomalia elma (Trimen, 1862)

=== Hesperiinae ===
==== Aeromachini ====
- Astictopterus abjecta (Snellen, 1872)
- Astictopterus anomoeus (Plötz, 1879)
- Prosopalpus debilis (Plötz, 1879)
- Prosopalpus saga Evans, 1937
- Prosopalpus styla Evans, 1937
- Kedestes protensa Butler, 1901
- Gorgyra aburae (Plötz, 1879)
- Gorgyra afikpo Druce, 1909
- Gorgyra aretina (Hewitson, 1878)
- Gorgyra diversata Evans, 1937
- Gorgyra heterochrus (Mabille, 1890)
- Gorgyra minima Holland, 1896
- Gorgyra mocquerysii Holland, 1896
- Gorgyra pali Evans, 1937
- Gorgyra sara Evans, 1937
- Gorgyra sola Evans, 1937
- Gorgyra subfacatus (Mabille, 1890)
- Gyrogra subnotata (Holland, 1894)
- Teniorhinus ignita (Mabille, 1877)
- Teniorhinus watsoni Holland, 1892
- Ceratrichia argyrosticta (Plötz, 1879)
- Ceratrichia clara Evans, 1937
- Ceratrichia crowleyi Riley, 1925
- Ceratrichia maesseni Miller, 1971
- Ceratrichia nothus (Fabricius, 1787)
- Ceratrichia phocion (Fabricius, 1781)
- Ceratrichia semilutea Mabille, 1891
- Pardaleodes edipus (Stoll, 1781)
- Pardaleodes incerta murcia (Plötz, 1883)
- Pardaleodes sator (Westwood, 1852)
- Pardaleodes tibullus (Fabricius, 1793)
- Pardaleodes xanthopeplus Holland, 1892
- Xanthodisca astrape (Holland, 1892)
- Xanthodisca rega (Mabille, 1890)
- Rhabdomantis galatia (Hewitson, 1868)
- Rhabdomantis sosia (Mabille, 1891)
- Osmodes adon (Mabille, 1890)
- Osmodes adosus (Mabille, 1890)
- Osmodes costatus Aurivillius, 1896
- Osmodes distincta Holland, 1896
- Osmodes laronia (Hewitson, 1868)
- Osmodes lindseyi occidentalis Miller, 1971
- Osmodes lux Holland, 1892
- Osmodes omar Swinhoe, 1916
- Osmodes thora (Plötz, 1884)
- Parosmodes lentiginosa (Holland, 1896)
- Parosmodes morantii axis Evans, 1937
- Paracleros biguttulus (Mabille, 1890)
- Paracleros placidus (Plötz, 1879)
- Paracleros substrigata (Holland, 1893)
- Osphantes ogowena (Mabille, 1891)
- Acleros mackenii olaus (Plötz, 1884)
- Acleros nigrapex Strand, 1913
- Acleros ploetzi Mabille, 1890
- Semalea arela (Mabille, 1891)
- Semalea atrio (Mabille, 1891)
- Semalea pulvina (Plötz, 1879)
- Semalea sextilis (Plötz, 1886)
- Hypoleucis sophia Evans, 1937
- Hypoleucis tripunctata Mabille, 1891
- Meza cybeutes volta Miller, 1971
- Meza elba (Evans, 1937)
- Meza indusiata (Mabille, 1891)
- Meza leucophaea (Holland, 1894)
- Meza mabea (Holland, 1894)
- Meza mabillei (Holland, 1893)
- Meza meza (Hewitson, 1877)
- Paronymus budonga (Evans, 1938)
- Paronymus xanthias (Mabille, 1891)
- Andronymus caesar (Fabricius, 1793)
- Andronymus evander (Mabille, 1890)
- Andronymus helles Evans, 1937
- Andronymus hero Evans, 1937
- Andronymus neander (Plötz, 1884)
- Zophopetes cerymica (Hewitson, 1867)
- Zophopetes quaternata (Mabille, 1876)
- Zophopetes ganda Evans, 1937
- Zophopetes haifa Evans, 1937
- Gamia buchholzi (Plötz, 1879)
- Gamia shelleyi (Sharpe, 1890)
- Artitropa comus (Stoll, 1782)
- Mopala orma (Plötz, 1879)
- Gretna balenge zowa Lindsey & Miller, 1965
- Gretna carmen Evans, 1937
- Gretna cylinda (Hewitson, 1876)
- Gretna lacida (Hewitson, 1876)
- Gretna waga (Plötz, 1886)
- Pteroteinon caenira (Hewitson, 1867)
- Pteroteinon capronnieri (Plötz, 1879)
- Pteroteinon ceucaenira (Druce, 1910)
- Pteroteinon concaenira Belcastro & Larsen, 1996
- Pteroteinon iricolor (Holland, 1890)
- Pteroteinon laterculus (Holland, 1890)
- Pteroteinon laufella (Hewitson, 1868)
- Pteroteinon pruna Evans, 1937
- Leona maracanda (Hewitson, 1876)
- Leona lena Evans, 1937
- Leona leonora (Plötz, 1879)
- Leona stoehri (Karsch, 1893)
- Leona meloui (Riley, 1926)
- Leona luehderi (Plötz, 1879)
- Caenides soritia (Hewitson, 1876)
- Caenides kangvensis Holland, 1896
- Caenides xychus (Mabille, 1891)
- Caenides benga (Holland, 1891)
- Caenides otilia Belcastro, 1990
- Caenides dacenilla Aurivillius, 1925
- Caenides dacela (Hewitson, 1876)
- Caenides hidaroides Aurivillius, 1896
- Caenides dacena (Hewitson, 1876)
- Monza alberti (Holland, 1896)
- Monza cretacea (Snellen, 1872)
- Melphina flavina Lindsey & Miller, 1965
- Melphina malthina (Hewitson, 1876)
- Melphina maximiliani Belcastro & Larsen, 2005
- Melphina melphis (Holland, 1893)
- Melphina noctula (Druce, 1909)
- Melphina statira (Mabille, 1891)
- Melphina statirides (Holland, 1896)
- Melphina tarace (Mabille, 1891)
- Melphina unistriga (Holland, 1893)
- Fresna carlo Evans, 1937
- Fresna cojo (Karsch, 1893)
- Fresna maesseni Miller, 1971
- Fresna netopha (Hewitson, 1878)
- Fresna nyassae (Hewitson, 1878)
- Platylesches batangae (Holland, 1894)
- Platylesches chamaeleon (Mabille, 1891)
- Platylesches galesa (Hewitson, 1877)
- Platylesches iva Evans, 1937
- Platylesches lamba Neave, 1910
- Platylesches moritili (Wallengren, 1857)
- Platylesches picanini (Holland, 1894)
- Platylesches rossii Belcastro, 1986

==== Baorini ====
- Pelopidas mathias (Fabricius, 1798)
- Pelopidas thrax (Hübner, 1821)
- Borbo binga (Evans, 1937)
- Borbo borbonica (Boisduval, 1833)
- Borbo fallax (Gaede, 1916)
- Borbo fanta (Evans, 1937)
- Borbo fatuellus (Hopffer, 1855)
- Borbo gemella (Mabille, 1884)
- Borbo holtzi (Plötz, 1883)
- Borbo micans (Holland, 1896)
- Borbo perobscura (Druce, 1912)
- Parnara monasi (Trimen & Bowker, 1889)
- Gegenes hottentota (Latreille, 1824)
- Gegenes niso brevicornis (Plötz, 1884)

== See also ==
- Geography of Ivory Coast gives ecoregions.
