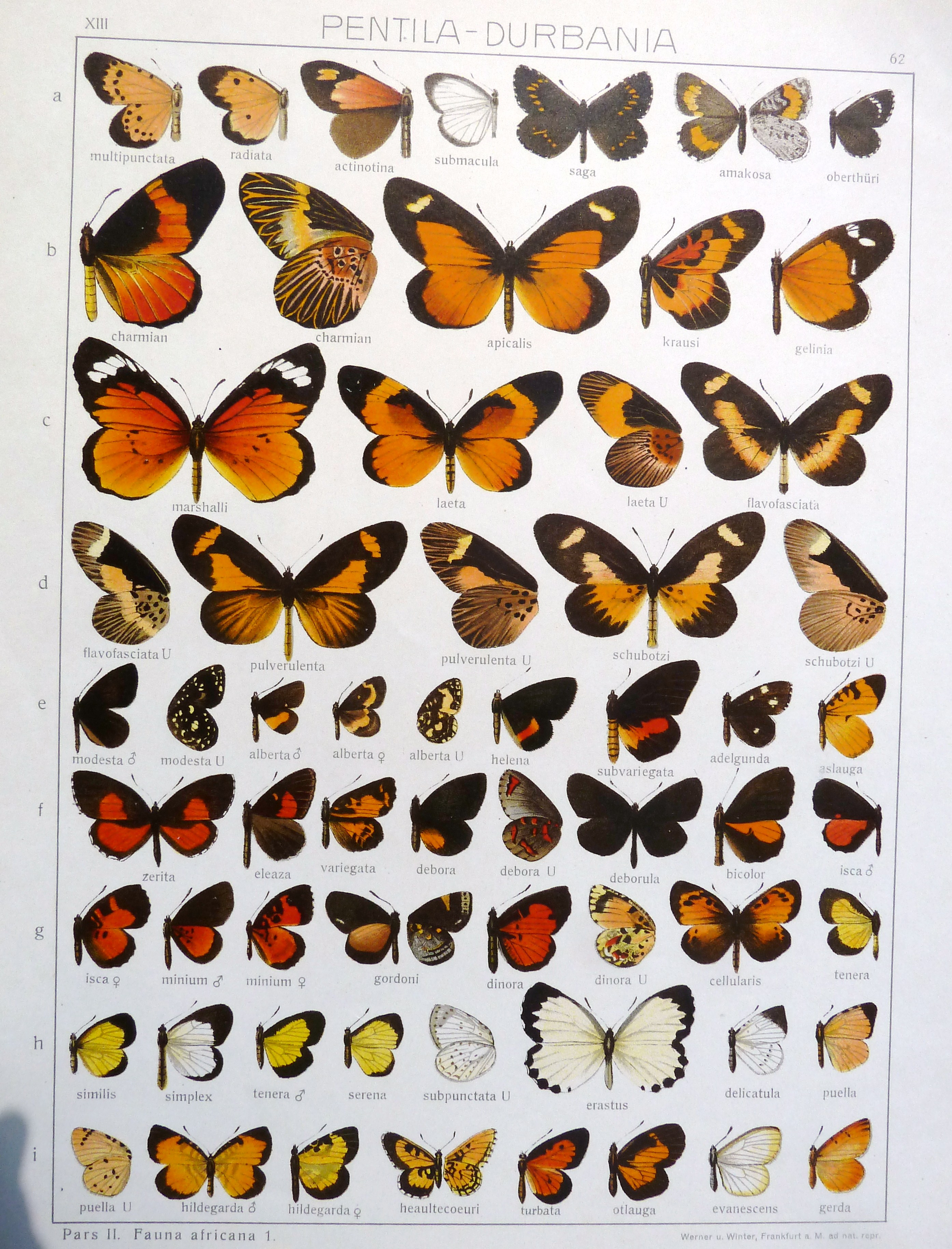
- In Adalbert Seitz's Fauna Africana

Scientific classification
- Kingdom: Animalia
- Phylum: Arthropoda
- Class: Insecta
- Order: Lepidoptera
- Family: Lycaenidae
- Genus: Liptena
- Species: L. modesta

Binomial name
- Liptena modesta (Kirby, 1890)

Synonyms
- Teriomima modesta Kirby, 1890; Pseuderesia latruncularia Holland, 1890

= Liptena modesta =

Species of butterfly

Liptena modesta, the modest false dots, is a butterfly in the family Lycaenidae. It is found in Nigeria (south and the Cross River loop), Cameroon, Gabon, the Republic of the Congo, the Central African Republic, the Democratic Republic of the Congo (Mayumbe, Uele, North Kivu, Tshuapa and Sankuru), Uganda and north-western Tanzania. The habitat consists of dark forests and dense secondary growth.
