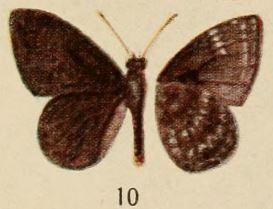

Scientific classification
- Kingdom: Animalia
- Phylum: Arthropoda
- Clade: Pancrustacea
- Class: Insecta
- Order: Lepidoptera
- Family: Lycaenidae
- Genus: Liptena
- Species: L. despecta

Binomial name
- Liptena despecta (Holland, 1890)

Synonyms
- Pseuderesia despecta Holland, 1890; Liptena modestissima Rebel, 1914; Epitola langi Holland, 1920

= Liptena despecta =

Species of butterfly

Liptena despecta, the small black liptena, is a butterfly in the family Lycaenidae. It is found in Nigeria (east and the Cross River loop), Cameroon, Gabon, the Democratic Republic of the Congo (Uele, North Kivu, Tshopo and Lualaba), Uganda and north-western Tanzania. The habitat consists of forests.
