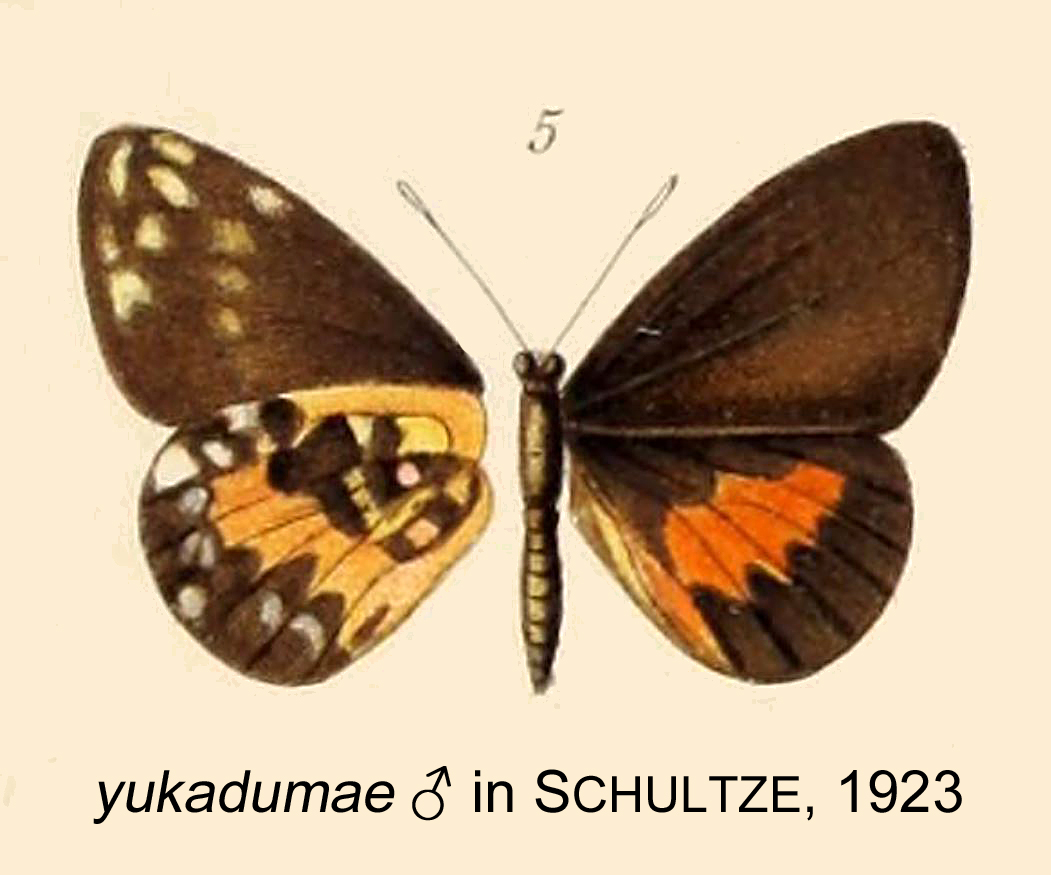
- Liptena Yukadumae

Scientific classification
- Kingdom: Animalia
- Phylum: Arthropoda
- Class: Insecta
- Order: Lepidoptera
- Family: Lycaenidae
- Genus: Liptena
- Species: L. yakadumae

Binomial name
- Liptena yakadumae Schultze, 1917

= Liptena yakadumae =

Species of butterfly

Liptena yakadumae is a butterfly in the family Lycaenidae. It is found in south-eastern Cameroon.
