= Liptena ochrea =

Scientific classification
- Kingdom: Animalia
- Phylum: Arthropoda
- Class: Insecta
- Order: Lepidoptera
- Family: Lycaenidae
- Genus: Liptena
- Species: L. ochrea

Binomial name
- Liptena ochrea Hawker-Smith, 1933

Species of butterfly

Liptena ochrea is a butterfly in the family Lycaenidae. It is found in Cameroon and the Republic of the Congo.
