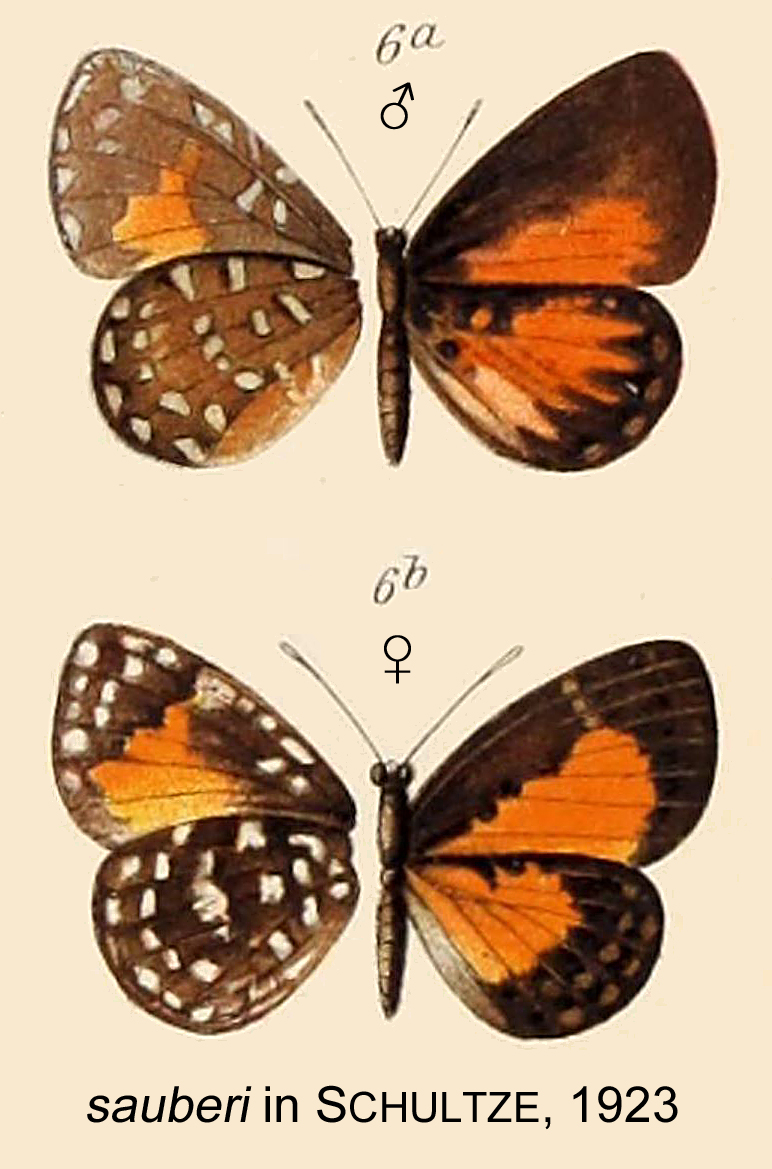
- Liptena sauberi

Scientific classification
- Kingdom: Animalia
- Phylum: Arthropoda
- Class: Insecta
- Order: Lepidoptera
- Family: Lycaenidae
- Subfamily: Poritiinae
- Tribe: Liptenini
- Genus: Liptena; Westwood, 1851

Synonyms
- Parapontia Röber, 1892; Leucolepis Karsch, 1893

= Liptena =

Butterfly genus in family Lycaenidae

Liptena is a genus of butterflies in the family Lycaenidae. Liptena is endemic to the Afrotropics.

== Species ==
- Liptena albicans Cator, 1904
- Liptena albomacula Hawker-Smith, 1933
- Liptena alluaudi Mabille, 1890
- Liptena amabilis Schultze, 1923
- Liptena augusta Suffert, 1904
- Liptena bassae Bethune-Baker, 1926
- Liptena batesana Bethune-Baker, 1926
- Liptena bergeri Stempffer, Bennett & May, 1974
- Liptena bia Larsen & Warren-Gash, 2008
- Liptena boei Libert, 1993
- Liptena bolivari Kheil, 1905
- Liptena catalina (Grose-Smith & Kirby, 1887)
- Liptena confusa Aurivillius, 1899
- Liptena congoana Hawker-Smith, 1933
- Liptena decempunctata Schultze, 1923
- Liptena decipiens (Kirby, 1890)
- Liptena despecta (Holland, 1890)
- Liptena durbania Bethune-Baker, 1915
- Liptena eketi Bethune-Baker, 1926
- Liptena eukrinaria Bethune-Baker, 1926
- Liptena eukrinoides Talbot, 1937
- Liptena evanescens (Kirby, 1887)
- Liptena fatima (Kirby, 1890)
- Liptena ferrymani (Grose-Smith & Kirby, 1891)
- Liptena flavicans (Grose-Smith & Kirby, 1891)
- Liptena fontainei Stempffer, Bennett & May, 1974
- Liptena fulvicans Hawker-Smith, 1933
- Liptena griveaudi Stempffer, 1969
- Liptena hapale Talbot, 1935
- Liptena helena (Druce, 1888)
- Liptena homeyeri Dewitz, 1884
- Liptena ilaro Stempffer, Bennett & May, 1974
- Liptena inframacula Hawker-Smith, 1933
- Liptena intermedia Grünberg, 1910
- Liptena kiellandi Congdon & Collins, 1998
- Liptena liberti Collins, Larsen & Rawlins, 2008
- Liptena lloydi Collins & Larsen, 2008
- Liptena lualaba Berger, 1981
- Liptena minziro Collins & Larsen, 2008
- Liptena modesta (Kirby, 1890)
- Liptena mwagensis Dufrane, 1953
- Liptena nigromarginata Stempffer, 1961
- Liptena occidentalis Bethune-Baker, 1926
- Liptena ochrea Hawker-Smith, 1933
- Liptena opaca (Kirby, 1890)
- Liptena o-rubrum (Holland, 1890)
- Liptena ouesso Stempffer, Bennett & May, 1974
- Liptena overlaeti Stempffer, Bennett & May, 1974
- Liptena pearmani Stempffer, Bennett & May, 1974
- Liptena perobscura Druce, 1910
- Liptena praestans (Grose-Smith, 1901)
- Liptena priscilla Larsen, 1995
- Liptena rochei Stempffer, 1951
- Liptena rubromacula Hawker-Smith, 1933
- Liptena sauberi Schultze, 1912
- Liptena septistrigata (Bethune-Baker, 1903)
- Liptena seyboui Warren-Gash & Larsen, 2003
- Liptena similis (Kirby, 1890)
- Liptena simplicia Möschler, 1887
- Liptena submacula Lathy, 1903
- Liptena subsuffusa Hawker-Smith, 1933
- Liptena subundularis (Staudinger, 1892)
- Liptena tiassale Stempffer, 1969
- Liptena titei Stempffer, Bennett & May, 1974
- Liptena tricolora (Bethune-Baker, 1915)
- Liptena turbata (Kirby, 1890)
- Liptena undina (Grose-Smith & Kirby, 1894)
- Liptena undularis Hewitson, 1866
- Liptena xanthostola (Holland, 1890)
- Liptena yukadumae Schultze, 1917
