= Liptena fulvicans =

Scientific classification
- Kingdom: Animalia
- Phylum: Arthropoda
- Class: Insecta
- Order: Lepidoptera
- Family: Lycaenidae
- Genus: Liptena
- Species: L. fulvicans

Binomial name
- Liptena fulvicans Hawker-Smith, 1933

Species of butterfly

Liptena fulvicans is a butterfly in the family Lycaenidae. It is found in the Democratic Republic of the Congo (Lualaba).
