= Liptena bolivari =

Scientific classification
- Kingdom: Animalia
- Phylum: Arthropoda
- Class: Insecta
- Order: Lepidoptera
- Family: Lycaenidae
- Genus: Liptena
- Species: L. bolivari

Binomial name
- Liptena bolivari Kheil, 1905

Species of butterfly

Liptena bolivari, the Bolivar's liptena, is a butterfly in the family Lycaenidae. It is found in southern Nigeria, Cameroon, Equatorial Guinea (Río Muni) and Gabon. The habitat consists of wetter forests.
