= Liptena boei =

Scientific classification
- Kingdom: Animalia
- Phylum: Arthropoda
- Class: Insecta
- Order: Lepidoptera
- Family: Lycaenidae
- Genus: Liptena
- Species: L. boei

Binomial name
- Liptena boei Libert, 1993

Species of butterfly

Liptena boei is a butterfly in the family Lycaenidae. It is found in western Cameroon. The habitat consists of submontane forests.
