= Liptena kiellandi =

Scientific classification
- Kingdom: Animalia
- Phylum: Arthropoda
- Class: Insecta
- Order: Lepidoptera
- Family: Lycaenidae
- Genus: Liptena
- Species: L. kiellandi

Binomial name
- Liptena kiellandi Congdon & Collins, 1998

Species of butterfly

Liptena kiellandi is a butterfly in the family Lycaenidae. It is found in Kenya and Tanzania. The habitat consists of forests.

== Subspecies ==
- Liptena kiellandi kiellandi (Tanzania)
- Liptena kiellandi kakamegae Congdon & Collins, 1998 (Kenya)
