= Liptena lloydi =

Scientific classification
- Kingdom: Animalia
- Phylum: Arthropoda
- Clade: Pancrustacea
- Class: Insecta
- Order: Lepidoptera
- Family: Lycaenidae
- Genus: Liptena
- Species: L. lloydi

Binomial name
- Liptena lloydi Collins & Larsen, 2008

Species of butterfly

Liptena lloydi is a butterfly in the family Lycaenidae. It is found in Cameroon and the Central African Republic.
