= Liptena occidentalis =

Scientific classification
- Kingdom: Animalia
- Phylum: Arthropoda
- Class: Insecta
- Order: Lepidoptera
- Family: Lycaenidae
- Genus: Liptena
- Species: L. occidentalis

Binomial name
- Liptena occidentalis Bethune-Baker, 1926

Species of butterfly

Liptena occidentalis is a butterfly in the family Lycaenidae. It is found in Cameroon.
