= Liptena subsuffusa =

Scientific classification
- Kingdom: Animalia
- Phylum: Arthropoda
- Class: Insecta
- Order: Lepidoptera
- Family: Lycaenidae
- Genus: Liptena
- Species: L. subsuffusa

Binomial name
- Liptena subsuffusa Hawker-Smith, 1933

Species of butterfly

Liptena subsuffusa is a butterfly in the family Lycaenidae. It is found in North Kivu in the Democratic Republic of the Congo.
