= Liptena decempunctata =

Scientific classification
- Kingdom: Animalia
- Phylum: Arthropoda
- Clade: Pancrustacea
- Class: Insecta
- Order: Lepidoptera
- Family: Lycaenidae
- Genus: Liptena
- Species: L. decempunctata

Binomial name
- Liptena decempunctata Schultze, 1923

Species of butterfly

Liptena decempunctata is a butterfly in the family Lycaenidae. It is found in Cameroon.
