= Liptena eukrinaria =

Scientific classification
- Kingdom: Animalia
- Phylum: Arthropoda
- Class: Insecta
- Order: Lepidoptera
- Family: Lycaenidae
- Genus: Liptena
- Species: L. eukrinaria

Binomial name
- Liptena eukrinaria Bethune-Baker, 1926

Species of butterfly

Liptena eukrinaria, the untidy liptena, is a butterfly in the family Lycaenidae. It is found in Nigeria (east and the Cross River loop) and western Cameroon. The habitat probably consists of drier forests.
