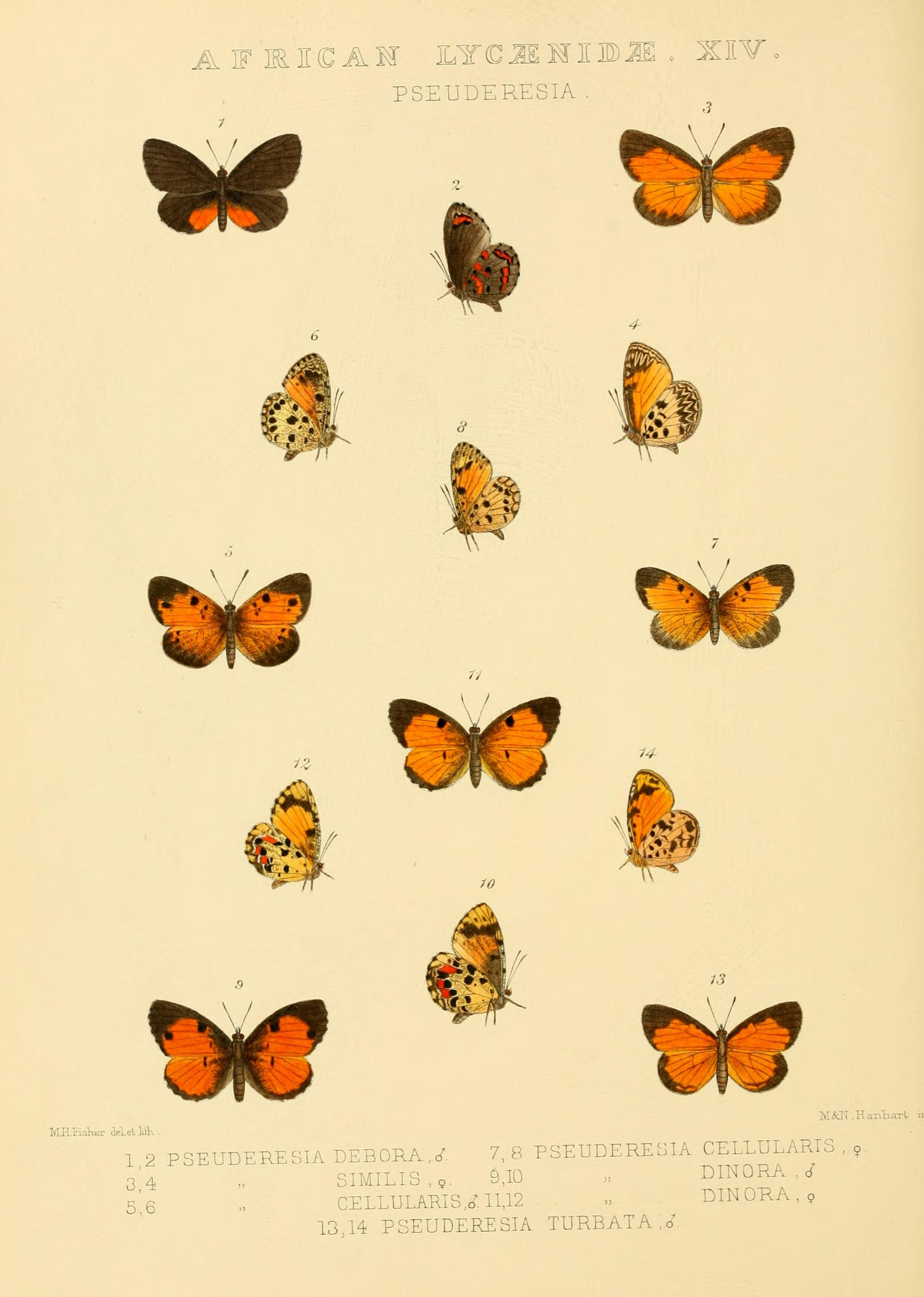

Scientific classification
- Kingdom: Animalia
- Phylum: Arthropoda
- Clade: Pancrustacea
- Class: Insecta
- Order: Lepidoptera
- Family: Lycaenidae
- Genus: Liptena
- Species: L. turbata

Binomial name
- Liptena turbata (Kirby, 1890)

Synonyms
- Pseuderesia turbata Kirby, 1890

= Liptena turbata =

Species of butterfly

Liptena turbata is a butterfly in the family Lycaenidae. It is found in Cameroon, the Republic of the Congo, Gabon and the southern part of the Democratic Republic of the Congo.
