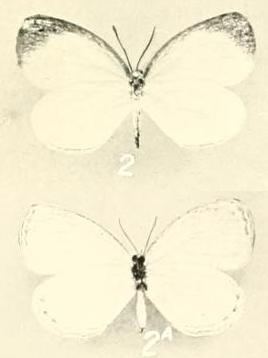

Scientific classification
- Kingdom: Animalia
- Phylum: Arthropoda
- Class: Insecta
- Order: Lepidoptera
- Family: Lycaenidae
- Genus: Liptena
- Species: L. augusta

Binomial name
- Liptena augusta Suffert, 1904

Synonyms
- Liptena angusta

= Liptena augusta =

Species of butterfly

Liptena augusta, the Suffert's liptena, is a butterfly in the family Lycaenidae. It is found in south-eastern Nigeria, Cameroon and Uganda. The habitat consists of forests.
