= Liptena rubromacula =

Scientific classification
- Kingdom: Animalia
- Phylum: Arthropoda
- Class: Insecta
- Order: Lepidoptera
- Family: Lycaenidae
- Genus: Liptena
- Species: L. rubromacula

Binomial name
- Liptena rubromacula Hawker-Smith, 1933

Synonyms
- Liptena rubromacula f. jacksoni Carpenter, 1934

Species of butterfly

Liptena rubromacula is a butterfly in the family Lycaenidae. It is found in the Democratic Republic of the Congo, Uganda and Tanzania. The habitat consists of forests.

== Subspecies ==
- Liptena rubromacula rubromacula (Democratic Republic of the Congo: North Kivu, Walikale and west of the Semliki)
- Liptena rubromacula jacksoni Carpenter, 1934 (Uganda: western shore of Lake Victoria, north-western Tanzania)
