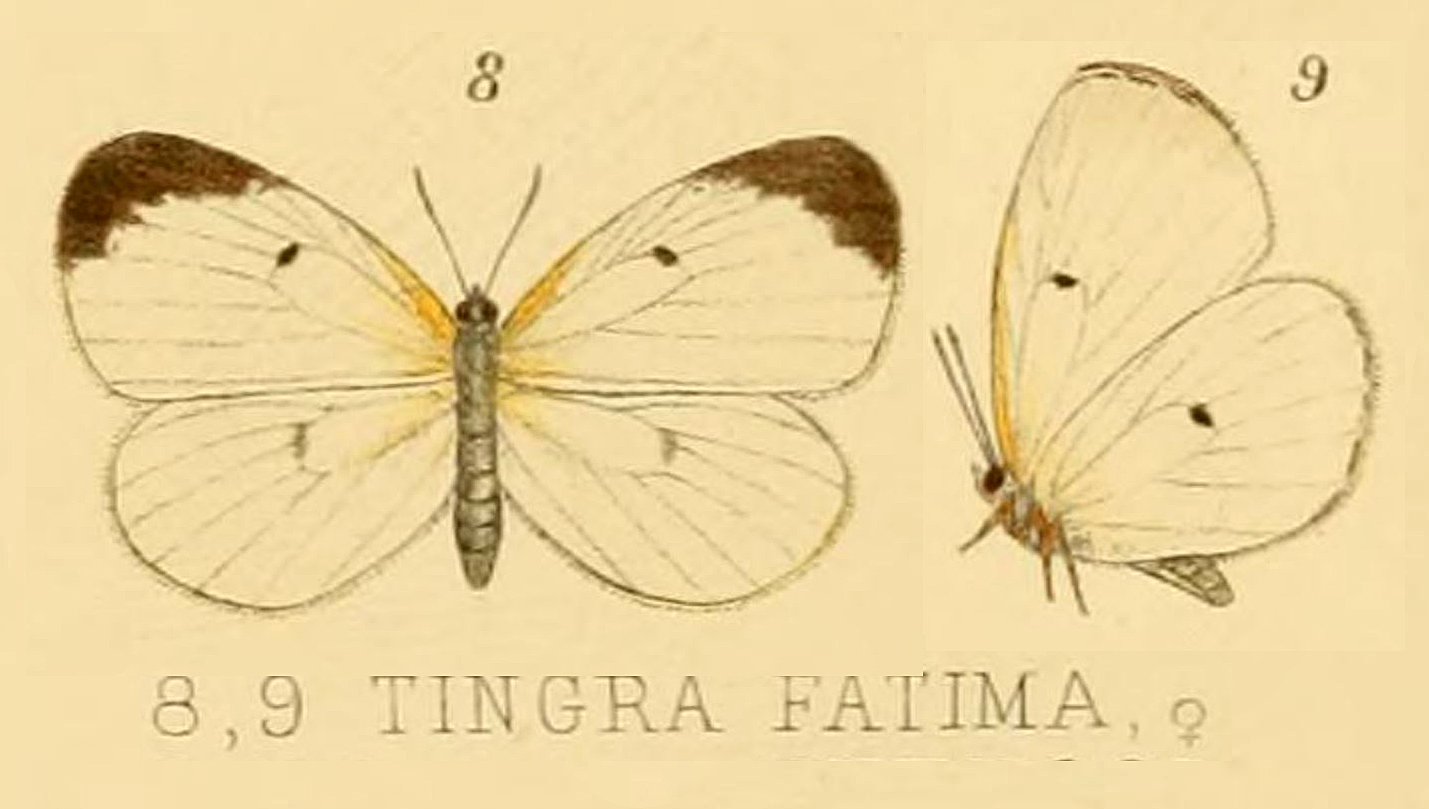

Scientific classification
- Kingdom: Animalia
- Phylum: Arthropoda
- Class: Insecta
- Order: Lepidoptera
- Family: Lycaenidae
- Genus: Liptena
- Species: L. fatima

Binomial name
- Liptena fatima (Kirby, 1890)

Synonyms
- Tingra fatima Kirby, 1890

= Liptena fatima =

Species of butterfly

Liptena fatima, is a butterfly in family Lycaenidae. It can be found in Ghana, Nigeria (the Niger Delta and the eastern part of the country), Cameroon, Equatorial Guinea (Bioko and Mbini), Gabon, the Republic of the Congo and the Democratic Republic of the Congo (Uele, Tshuapa, Equateur, Kinshasa, Kasai and Sankuru). Liptena fatima resides in forests.
