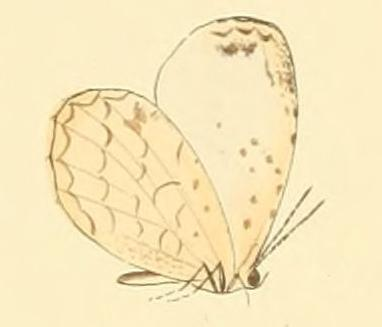

Scientific classification
- Kingdom: Animalia
- Phylum: Arthropoda
- Class: Insecta
- Order: Lepidoptera
- Family: Lycaenidae
- Genus: Liptena
- Species: L. undularis

Binomial name
- Liptena undularis Hewitson, 1866

= Liptena undularis =

Species of butterfly

Liptena undularis is a butterfly in the family Lycaenidae. It is found in Cameroon, Gabon, the Republic of the Congo, the Democratic Republic of the Congo and Angola.

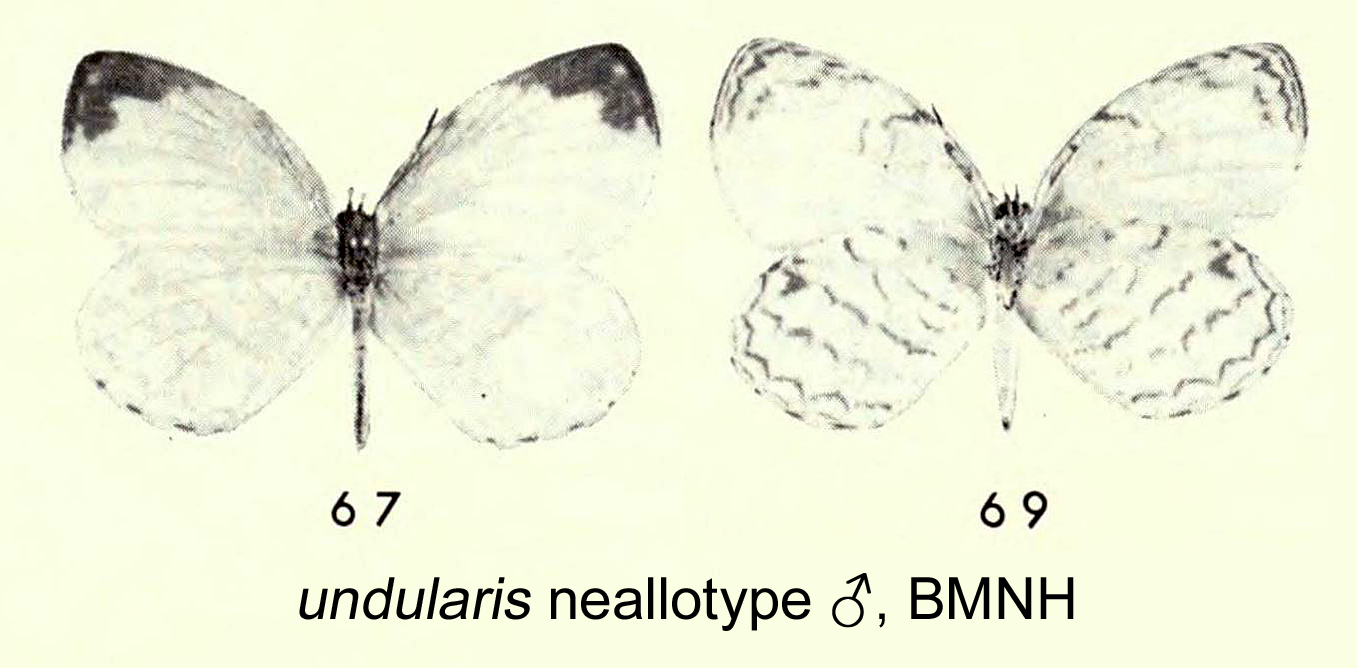
Liptena undularis
