= Liptena intermedia =

Scientific classification
- Kingdom: Animalia
- Phylum: Arthropoda
- Class: Insecta
- Order: Lepidoptera
- Family: Lycaenidae
- Genus: Liptena
- Species: L. intermedia

Binomial name
- Liptena intermedia Grünberg, 1910

Species of butterfly

Liptena intermedia is a butterfly in the family Lycaenidae. It is found in southern Cameroon and Equatorial Guinea.
