= Liptena hapale =

Scientific classification
- Kingdom: Animalia
- Phylum: Arthropoda
- Class: Insecta
- Order: Lepidoptera
- Family: Lycaenidae
- Genus: Liptena
- Species: L. hapale

Binomial name
- Liptena hapale Talbot, 1935

Butterfly in the family Lycaenidae from east Africa

Liptena hapale is a butterfly in the family Lycaenidae. It is found in Uganda and north-western Tanzania. Liptena hapale was first described by George Talbot in 1935.
