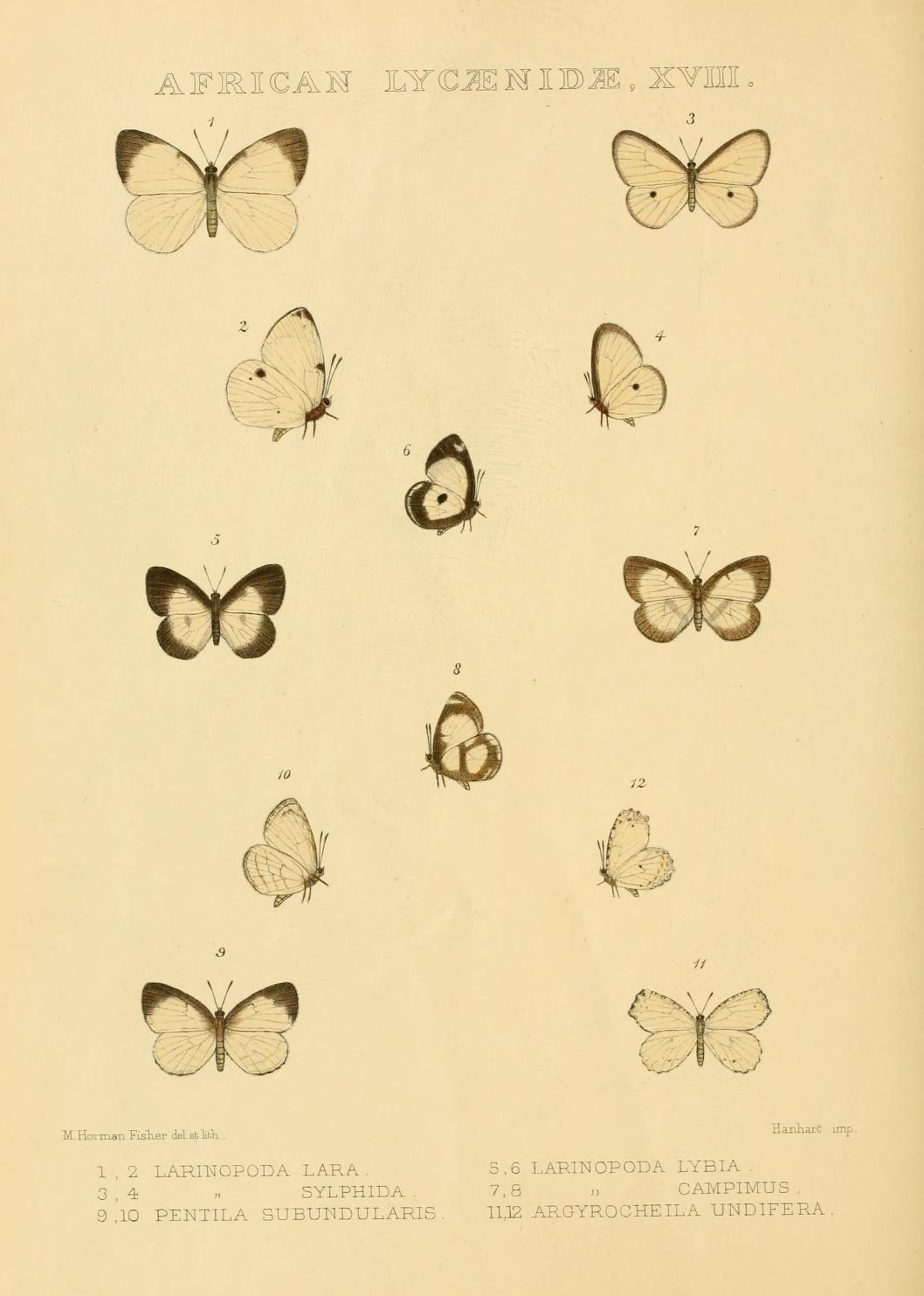
- Figures 9 and 10

Scientific classification
- Kingdom: Animalia
- Phylum: Arthropoda
- Class: Insecta
- Order: Lepidoptera
- Family: Lycaenidae
- Genus: Liptena
- Species: L. subundularis

Binomial name
- Liptena subundularis (Staudinger, 1892)

Synonyms
- Pentila subundularis Staudinger, 1892

= Liptena subundularis =

Species of butterfly

Liptena subundularis is a butterfly in the family Lycaenidae. It is found in Cameroon, Bioko and Gabon.
