= Liptena eketi =

Scientific classification
- Kingdom: Animalia
- Phylum: Arthropoda
- Class: Insecta
- Order: Lepidoptera
- Family: Lycaenidae
- Genus: Liptena
- Species: L. eketi

Binomial name
- Liptena eketi Bethune-Baker, 1926

Species of butterfly

Liptena eketi, the small ochre liptena, is a butterfly in the family Lycaenidae. It is found in southern and eastern Nigeria and Cameroon.
