= Liptena bassae =

Scientific classification
- Kingdom: Animalia
- Phylum: Arthropoda
- Clade: Pancrustacea
- Class: Insecta
- Order: Lepidoptera
- Family: Lycaenidae
- Genus: Liptena
- Species: L. bassae

Binomial name
- Liptena bassae Bethune-Baker, 1926

Synonyms
- Liptena subpunctata Bethune-Baker, 1906

Species of butterfly

Liptena bassae, the Bassa liptena, is a butterfly in the family Lycaenidae. It is found in western Nigeria. The butterfly's habitat consists of drier forests.

Torben Larsen developed a species numbering system for his 2005 publication Butterflies of West Africa. This species is #228. The 'Larsen' numbers have since been used with permission in A Sharp Eye on Butterflies of Ghana.
