= Liptena perobscura =

Scientific classification
- Kingdom: Animalia
- Phylum: Arthropoda
- Class: Insecta
- Order: Lepidoptera
- Family: Lycaenidae
- Genus: Liptena
- Species: L. perobscura

Binomial name
- Liptena perobscura H. H. Druce, 1910

Synonyms
- Liptena kelle Stempffer, 1964

Species of butterfly

Liptena perobscura is a butterfly in the family Lycaenidae. It was first described by Hamilton Herbert Druce in 1910. It is found in Cameroon and the Republic of the Congo.
