= Liptena liberti =

Scientific classification
- Kingdom: Animalia
- Phylum: Arthropoda
- Class: Insecta
- Order: Lepidoptera
- Family: Lycaenidae
- Genus: Liptena
- Species: L. liberti

Binomial name
- Liptena liberti Collins, Larsen & Rawlins, 2008

Species of butterfly

Liptena liberti is a butterfly in the family Lycaenidae. It is found in Cameroon.
