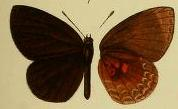

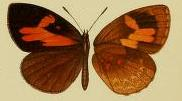

Scientific classification
- Kingdom: Animalia
- Phylum: Arthropoda
- Class: Insecta
- Order: Lepidoptera
- Family: Lycaenidae
- Genus: Liptena
- Species: L. orubrum

Binomial name
- Liptena orubrum (Holland, 1890)

Synonyms
- Pseuderesia o-rubrum Holland, 1890; Liptena daemon Druce, 1910; Pseuderesia tripunctata Grose-Smith & Kirby, 1894

= Liptena orubrum =

Species of butterfly

Liptena orubrum, the large black liptena, is a butterfly in the family Lycaenidae. It is found in Nigeria, Cameroon, Gabon, the Republic of the Congo, the Democratic Republic of the Congo, Uganda and Tanzania. The habitat consists of forests.

== Subspecies ==
- Liptena orubrum orubrum (southern and eastern Nigeria, Cameroon, Gabon, Congo)
- Liptena orubrum teroana Talbot, 1935 (Uganda, north-western Tanzania)
- Liptena orubrum tripunctata (Grose-Smith & Kirby, 1894) (Democratic Republic of the Congo: Mongala, Uele, North Kivu, Kasai, Sankuru and Lualaba)
