= Liptena amabilis =

Scientific classification
- Kingdom: Animalia
- Phylum: Arthropoda
- Class: Insecta
- Order: Lepidoptera
- Family: Lycaenidae
- Genus: Liptena
- Species: L. amabilis

Binomial name
- Liptena amabilis Schultze, 1923

Species of butterfly

Liptena amabilis is a butterfly in the family Lycaenidae. It is found in Cameroon, the Republic of the Congo, the Democratic Republic of the Congo, Uganda and Tanzania. The habitat consists of forests.

== Subspecies ==
- Liptena amabilis amabilis (Cameroon, Congo, Democratic Republic of the Congo)
- Liptena amabilis nyanzae Congdon, Kielland & Collins, 1998 (Uganda: western shores of Lake Victoria, Tanzania: north-west to the shores of Lake Victoria)
