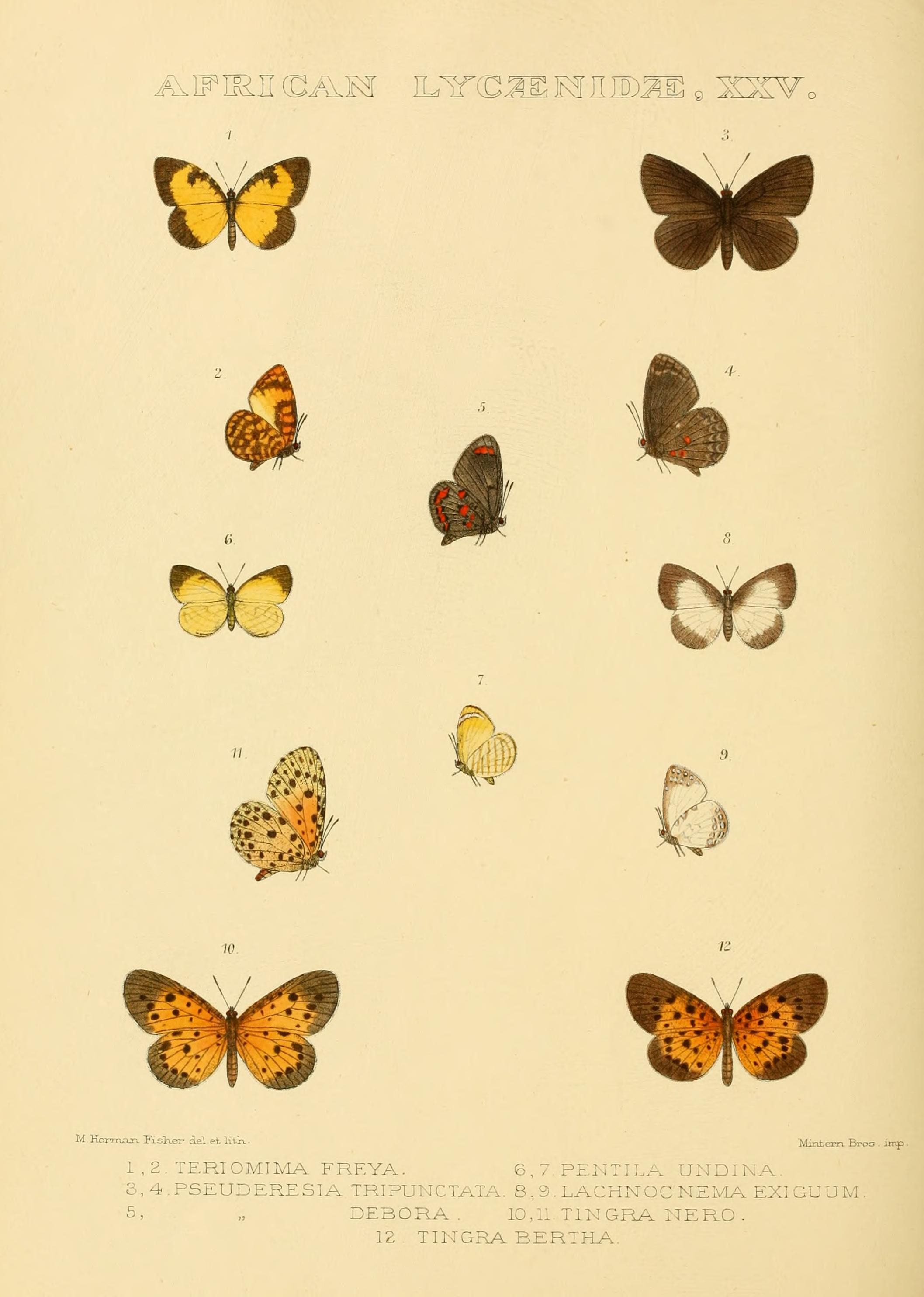
- Figures 6 and 7

Scientific classification
- Kingdom: Animalia
- Phylum: Arthropoda
- Class: Insecta
- Order: Lepidoptera
- Family: Lycaenidae
- Genus: Liptena
- Species: L. undina

Binomial name
- Liptena undina (Grose-Smith & Kirby, 1894)

Synonyms
- Pentila undina Grose-Smith & Kirby, 1894

= Liptena undina =

Species of butterfly

Liptena undina is a butterfly in the family Lycaenidae. It is found in Cameroon, Gabon, the Republic of the Congo, the Democratic Republic of the Congo (Uele, Equateur and Sankuru), Uganda and north-western Tanzania. The habitat consists of forests.
