= Liptena eukrinoides =

Scientific classification
- Kingdom: Animalia
- Phylum: Arthropoda
- Class: Insecta
- Order: Lepidoptera
- Family: Lycaenidae
- Genus: Liptena
- Species: L. eukrinoides

Binomial name
- Liptena eukrinoides Talbot, 1937

Species of butterfly

Liptena eukrinoides is a butterfly in the family Lycaenidae. It is found in Uganda (the western shores of Lake Victoria) and north-western Tanzania. The habitat consists of forests.
