= Liptena nigromarginata =

Scientific classification
- Kingdom: Animalia
- Phylum: Arthropoda
- Class: Insecta
- Order: Lepidoptera
- Family: Lycaenidae
- Genus: Liptena
- Species: L. nigromarginata

Binomial name
- Liptena nigromarginata Stempffer, 1961

Synonyms
- Liptena jacksoni Stempffer, 1954

Species of butterfly

Liptena nigromarginata is a butterfly in the family Lycaenidae. It is found in north-western Tanzania, Uganda, the Democratic Republic of the Congo (Sankuru) and the Republic of the Congo. The habitat consists of forests.
