= Liptena batesana =

Scientific classification
- Kingdom: Animalia
- Phylum: Arthropoda
- Class: Insecta
- Order: Lepidoptera
- Family: Lycaenidae
- Genus: Liptena
- Species: L. batesana

Binomial name
- Liptena batesana Bethune-Baker, 1926

Species of butterfly

Liptena batesana, the Bates' liptena, is a butterfly in the family Lycaenidae. It is found in Cameroon, the Republic of the Congo, and Uganda (Bwamba).
