= Liptena tricolora =

Scientific classification
- Kingdom: Animalia
- Phylum: Arthropoda
- Class: Insecta
- Order: Lepidoptera
- Family: Lycaenidae
- Genus: Liptena
- Species: L. tricolora

Binomial name
- Liptena tricolora (Bethune-Baker, 1915)

Synonyms
- Pentila tricolora Bethune-Baker, 1915

Species of butterfly

Liptena tricolora is a butterfly in the family Lycaenidae. It is found in Cameroon.
