= Liptena ilaro =

Scientific classification
- Kingdom: Animalia
- Phylum: Arthropoda
- Class: Insecta
- Order: Lepidoptera
- Family: Lycaenidae
- Genus: Liptena
- Species: L. ilaro

Binomial name
- Liptena ilaro Stempffer, Bennett & May, 1974

Species of butterfly

Liptena ilaro, the Ilaro liptena, is a butterfly in the family Lycaenidae. It is found in western Nigeria (the now destroyed Ilaro Forest). The habitat consists of dry forests.
