= Liptena bia =

Scientific classification
- Kingdom: Animalia
- Phylum: Arthropoda
- Clade: Pancrustacea
- Class: Insecta
- Order: Lepidoptera
- Family: Lycaenidae
- Genus: Liptena
- Species: L. bia

Binomial name
- Liptena bia Larsen & Warren-Gash, 2008

Species of butterfly

Liptena bia is a butterfly in the family Lycaenidae. It is found in Ghana, Ivory Coast, Liberia and Sierra Leone.

Torben Larsen developed a species numbering system for his 2005 publication Butterflies of West Africa. This species was #236. The 'Larsen' numbers have since been used with permission in A Sharp Eye on Butterflies of Ghana. where the species is described as Liptena praestans bia.
