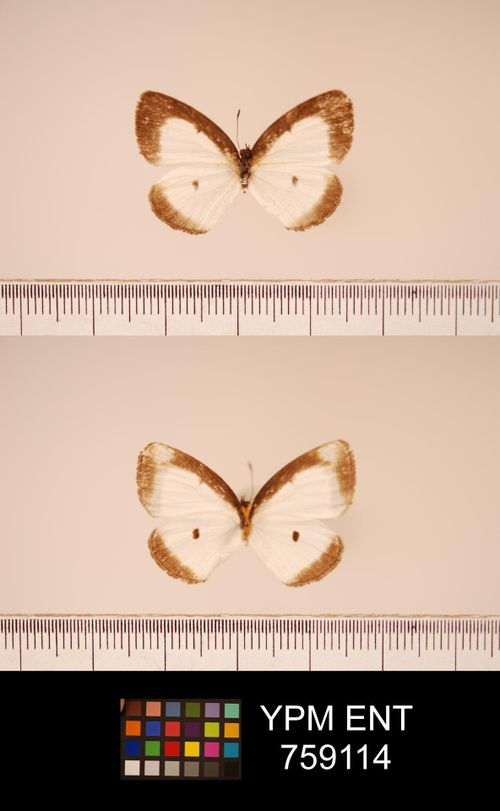

Scientific classification
- Kingdom: Animalia
- Phylum: Arthropoda
- Class: Insecta
- Order: Lepidoptera
- Family: Lycaenidae
- Genus: Liptena
- Species: L. albomacula

Binomial name
- Liptena albomacula Hawker-Smith, 1933

= Liptena albomacula =

Species of insect

Liptena albomacula is a butterfly in the family Lycaenidae. It is found in the Democratic Republic of the Congo (Sankuru and Lualaba), Uganda and Cameroon.
