= Liptena priscilla =

Scientific classification
- Kingdom: Animalia
- Phylum: Arthropoda
- Class: Insecta
- Order: Lepidoptera
- Family: Lycaenidae
- Genus: Liptena
- Species: L. priscilla

Binomial name
- Liptena priscilla Larsen, 1995

Species of butterfly

Liptena priscilla, the Obudu liptena, is a butterfly in the family Lycaenidae. It is found in Nigeria (the Obudu Plateau). The habitat consists of submontane forests.
