= Liptena mwagensis =

Scientific classification
- Kingdom: Animalia
- Phylum: Arthropoda
- Class: Insecta
- Order: Lepidoptera
- Family: Lycaenidae
- Genus: Liptena
- Species: L. mwagensis

Binomial name
- Liptena mwagensis Dufrane, 1953

Species of butterfly

Liptena mwagensis is a butterfly in the family Lycaenidae. It is found in the Democratic Republic of the Congo.
