= Liptena fontainei =

Scientific classification
- Kingdom: Animalia
- Phylum: Arthropoda
- Class: Insecta
- Order: Lepidoptera
- Family: Lycaenidae
- Genus: Liptena
- Species: L. fontainei

Binomial name
- Liptena fontainei Stempffer, Bennett & May, 1974

Species of butterfly

Liptena fontainei is a butterfly in the family Lycaenidae. It is found in the Democratic Republic of the Congo (Uele).
