= Liptena congoana =

Scientific classification
- Kingdom: Animalia
- Phylum: Arthropoda
- Class: Insecta
- Order: Lepidoptera
- Family: Lycaenidae
- Genus: Liptena
- Species: L. congoana

Binomial name
- Liptena congoana Hawker-Smith, 1933

Species of butterfly

Liptena congoana is a butterfly in the family Lycaenidae. It is found in the Republic of the Congo, the Democratic Republic of the Congo (North Kivu) and Uganda.
