= Liptena minziro =

Scientific classification
- Kingdom: Animalia
- Phylum: Arthropoda
- Class: Insecta
- Order: Lepidoptera
- Family: Lycaenidae
- Genus: Liptena
- Species: L. minziro

Binomial name
- Liptena minziro Collins & Larsen, 2008

Species of butterfly

Liptena minziro is a butterfly in the family Lycaenidae. It is found in the Kakamega Forest in Kenya and at Minziro Forest in Tanzania.
