= Liptena lualaba =

Scientific classification
- Kingdom: Animalia
- Phylum: Arthropoda
- Class: Insecta
- Order: Lepidoptera
- Family: Lycaenidae
- Genus: Liptena
- Species: L. lualaba

Binomial name
- Liptena lualaba Berger, 1981

Species of butterfly

Liptena lualaba is a butterfly in the family Lycaenidae. It is found in the Democratic Republic of the Congo (Lualaba and Uele) and Zambia.
