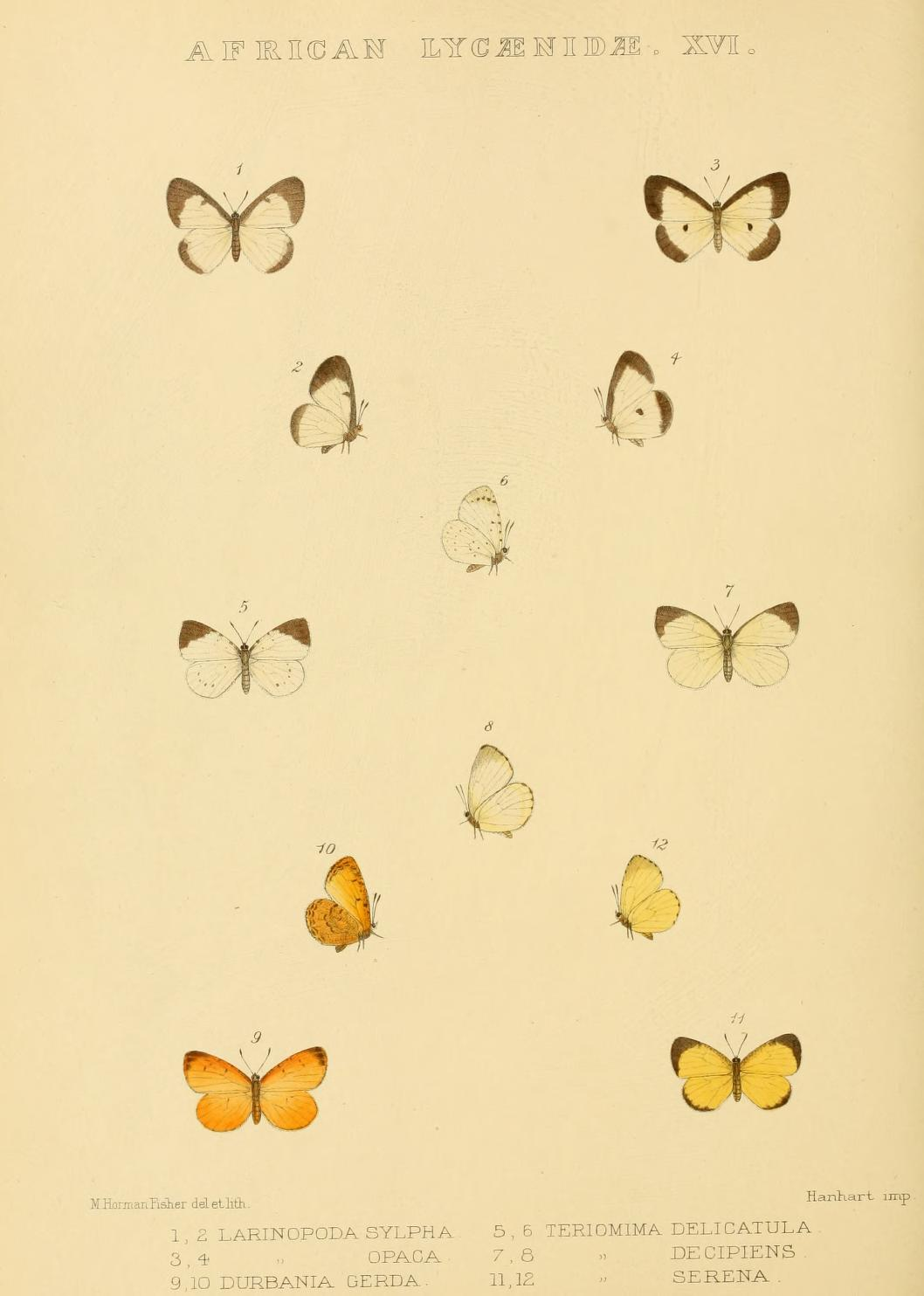

Scientific classification
- Kingdom: Animalia
- Phylum: Arthropoda
- Class: Insecta
- Order: Lepidoptera
- Family: Lycaenidae
- Genus: Liptena
- Species: L. opaca

Binomial name
- Liptena opaca (Kirby, 1890)

Synonyms
- Larinopoda opaca Kirby, 1890; Liptena opaca var. immaculata Grünberg, 1910

= Liptena opaca =

Species of butterfly

Liptena opaca, the Kirby's liptena, is a butterfly in the family Lycaenidae. It is found in Nigeria, Cameroon, Equatorial Guinea, the Republic of the Congo, Gabon, the Democratic Republic of the Congo, Uganda and Tanzania. The habitat consists of forests.

== Subspecies ==
- Liptena opaca opaca (eastern Nigeria, Cameroon, Equatorial Guinea: Mbini)
- Liptena opaca centralis Stempffer, Bennett & May, 1974 (Cameroon, Congo)
- Liptena opaca gabunica Stempffer, Bennett & May, 1974 (Gabon, Democratic Republic of the Congo: Kwilu)
- Liptena opaca sankuru Stempffer, Bennett & May, 1974 (Democratic Republic of the Congo: Uele and Sankuru)
- Liptena opaca ugandana Stempffer, Bennett & May, 1974 (western and central Uganda, north-western Tanzania)
