= Liptena albicans =

Scientific classification
- Kingdom: Animalia
- Phylum: Arthropoda
- Class: Insecta
- Order: Lepidoptera
- Family: Lycaenidae
- Genus: Liptena
- Species: L. albicans

Binomial name
- Liptena albicans Cator, 1904

Species of butterfly

Liptena albicans, the Cator's liptena, is a butterfly in the family Lycaenidae. It is found in Guinea, Sierra Leone, Liberia, Ivory Coast, Ghana and possibly Nigeria. The habitat consists of forests.
