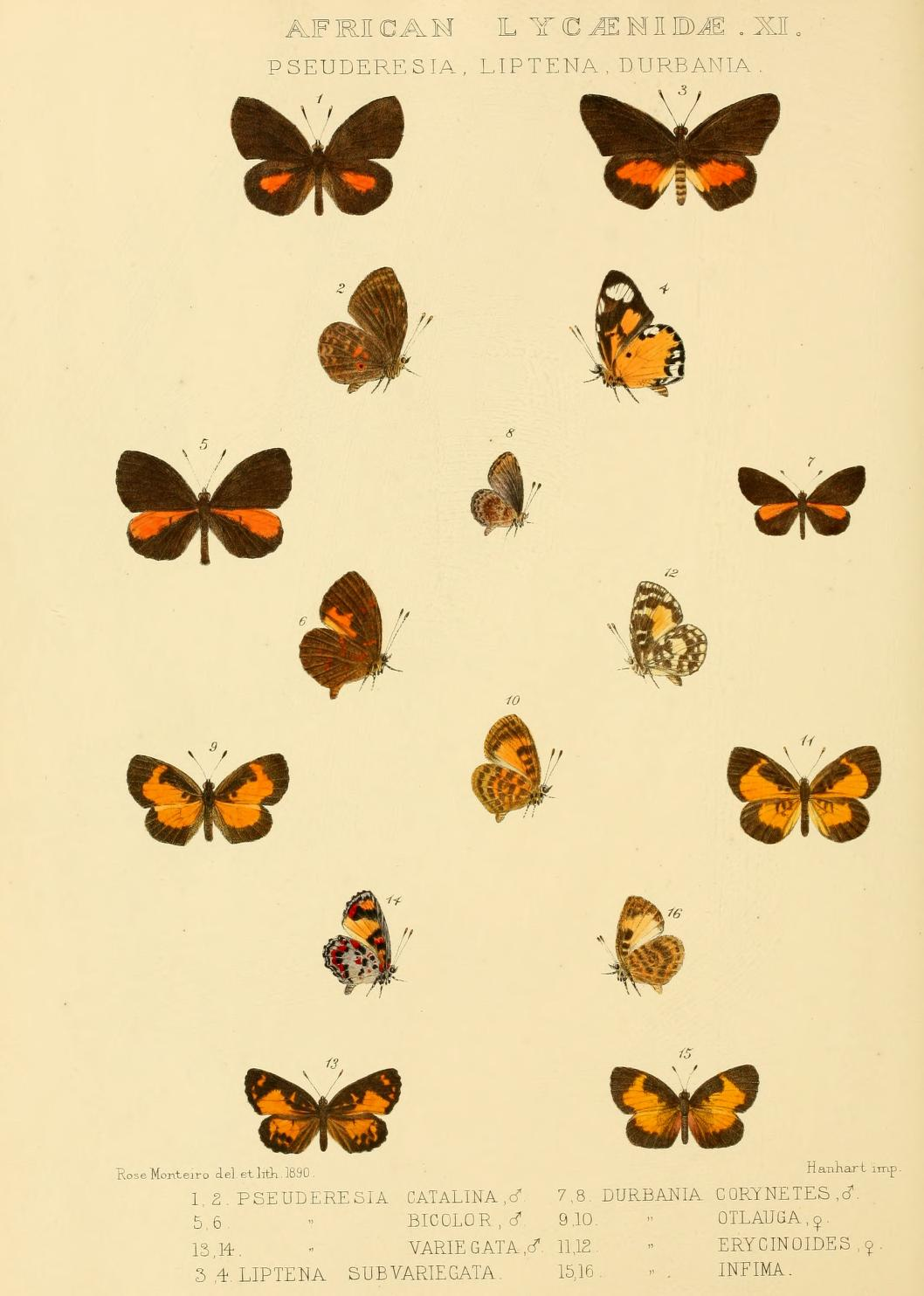

Scientific classification
- Kingdom: Animalia
- Phylum: Arthropoda
- Clade: Pancrustacea
- Class: Insecta
- Order: Lepidoptera
- Family: Lycaenidae
- Genus: Liptena
- Species: L. catalina

Binomial name
- Liptena catalina (Grose-Smith & Kirby, 1887)

Synonyms
- Pseuderesia catalina Grose-Smith & Kirby, 1887

= Obania catalina =

Species of butterfly

Obania catalina, formerly Liptena catalina, the red-patch liptena, is a butterfly in the family Lycaenidae. It is found in Sierra Leone, Liberia, Ivory Coast, Ghana, Nigeria, Cameroon and Gabon. The habitat consists of forests.

The larvae are possibly associated with ground-dwelling ants.

Torben Larsen developed a species numbering system for his 2005 publication Butterflies of West Africa. This species is #243 and was described in 2005 as Liptena catalina. The 'Larsen' numbers have since been used with permission in A Sharp Eye on Butterflies of Ghana.
