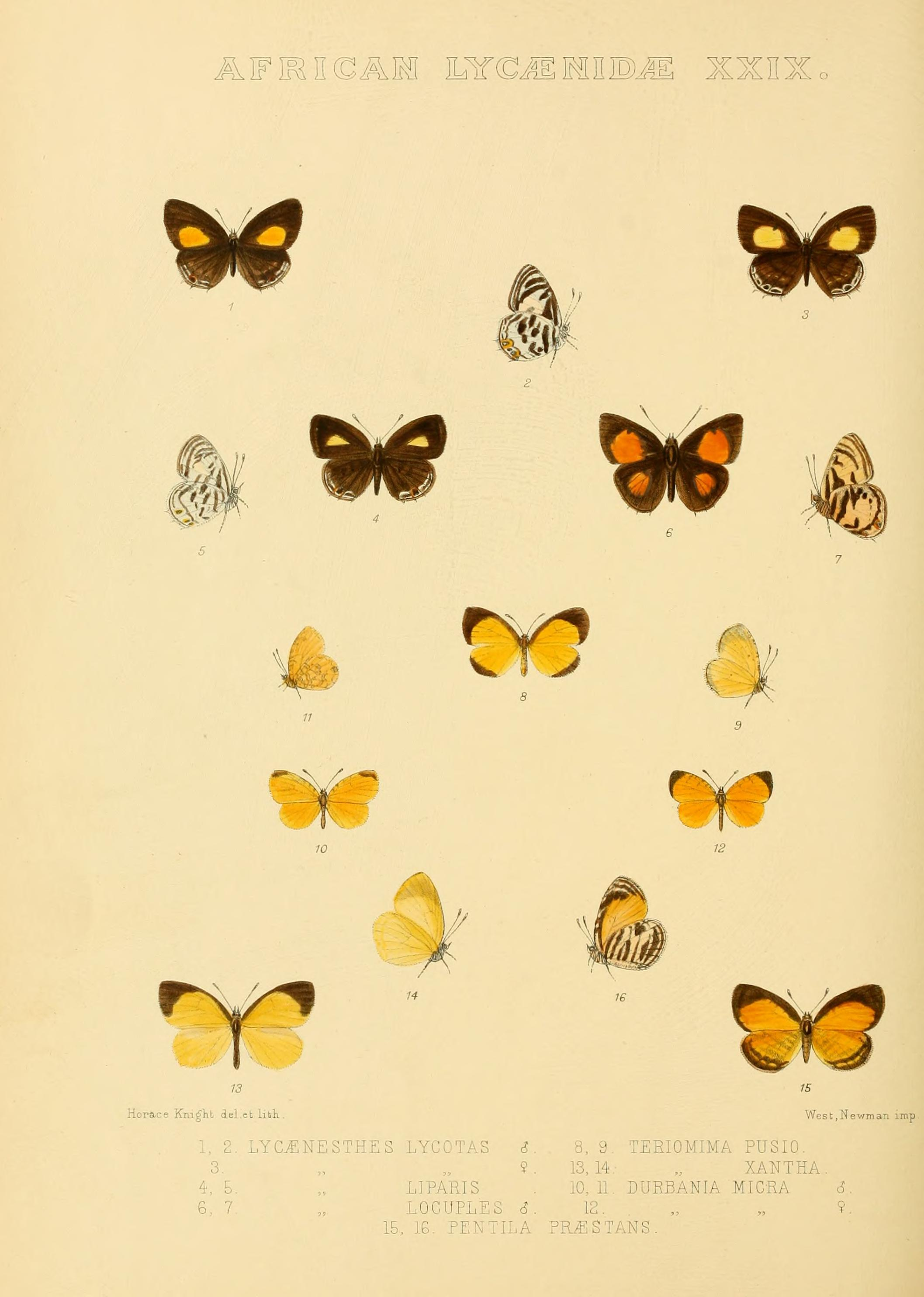
- Figures 13 and 14

Scientific classification
- Kingdom: Animalia
- Phylum: Arthropoda
- Clade: Pancrustacea
- Class: Insecta
- Order: Lepidoptera
- Family: Lycaenidae
- Genus: Liptena
- Species: L. xanthostola

Binomial name
- Liptena xanthostola (Holland, 1890)

Synonyms
- Teriomima xanthostola Holland, 1890; Liptena xantha coomassiensis Hawker-Smith, 1933; Teriomima xantha Grose-Smith, 1901

= Liptena xanthostola =

Species of butterfly

Liptena xanthostola, the yellow liptena, is a butterfly in the family Lycaenidae. It is found in Guinea, Sierra Leone, Liberia, Ivory Coast, Ghana, Nigeria, Cameroon, Equatorial Guinea, Gabon, the Republic of the Congo, Angola, the Democratic Republic of the Congo, Sudan, Uganda, Kenya, Tanzania and Zambia.The habitat consists of dense primary forests at altitudes between 900 and 1,500 metres.

The larvae feed on lichens growing on tree trunks.

== Subspecies ==
- Liptena xanthostola xanthostola (Nigeria, Cameroon, Equatorial Guinea: Mbini, Gabon, Congo, Democratic Republic of the Congo: Kwilu)
- Liptena xanthostola coomassiensis Hawker-Smith, 1933 (Guinea, Sierra Leone, Liberia, Ivory Coast, Ghana)
- Liptena xanthostola xantha (Grose-Smith, 1901) (Sudan, Uganda, western Kenya, Tanzania: north-west to Kigoma and Mpanda, Zambia, Angola, Democratic Republic of the Congo: Uele, Ituri, Kivu, Equateur, Sankuru, Kasai, Lualaba and Maniema)

Torben Larsen developed a species numbering system for his 2005 publication Butterflies of West Africa. The subspecies coomassiensis is #234. The 'Larsen' numbers have since been used with permission in A Sharp Eye on Butterflies of Ghana.
