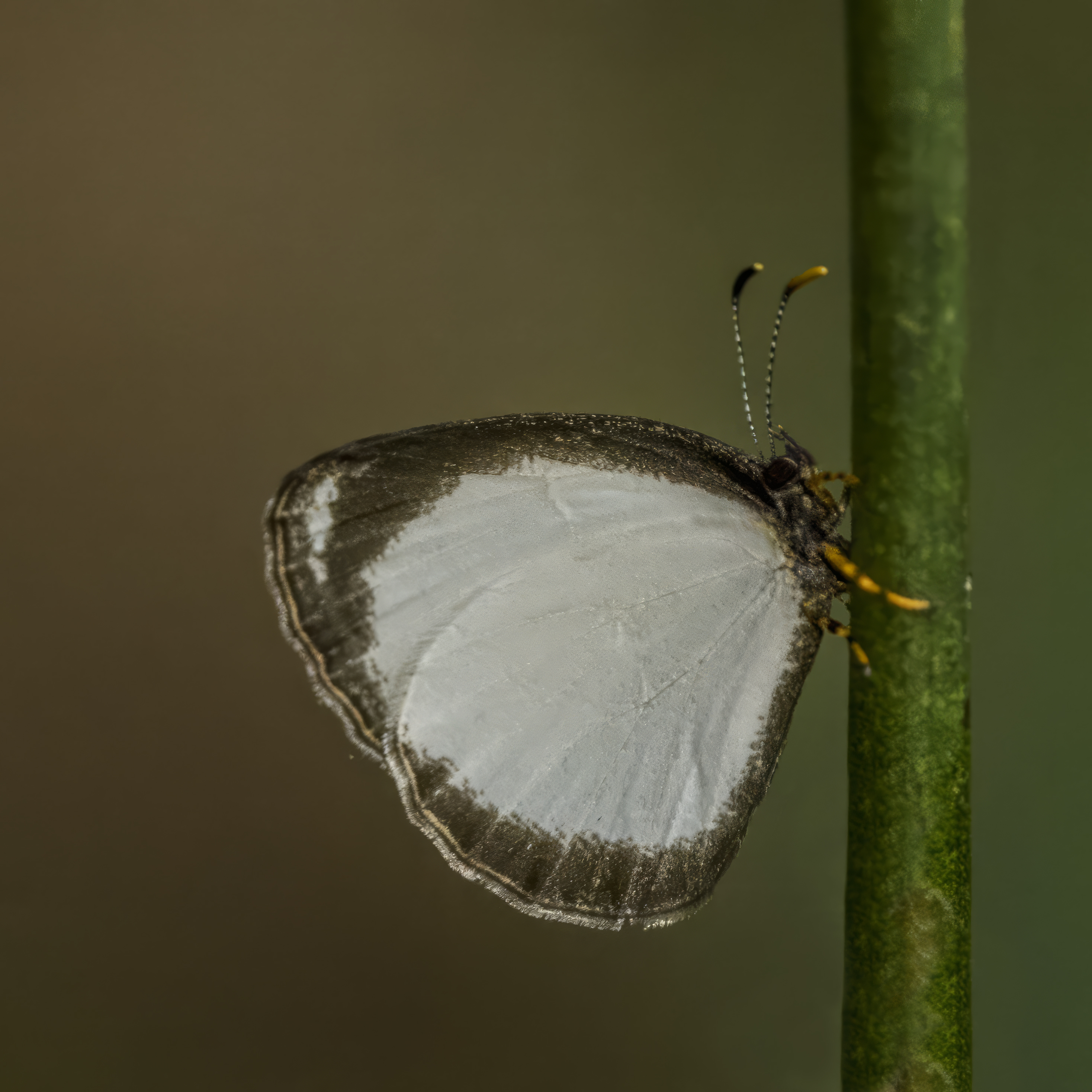
- In Ghana

Scientific classification
- Kingdom: Animalia
- Phylum: Arthropoda
- Clade: Pancrustacea
- Class: Insecta
- Order: Lepidoptera
- Family: Lycaenidae
- Genus: Liptena
- Species: L. simplicia

Binomial name
- Liptena simplicia Möschler, 1887

Synonyms
- Larinopoda albula Druce, 1888; Lycaena semilimbata Mabille, 1890

= Liptena simplicia =

Species of butterfly

Liptena simplicia, the simple liptena, is a butterfly in the family Lycaenidae. It is found in Guinea, Sierra Leone, Liberia, Ivory Coast, Ghana and western Nigeria.The habitat consists of forests.

Adults have been recorded feeding from extrafloral nectaries of Marantaceae species.

Torben Larsen developed a species numbering system for his 2005 publication Butterflies of West Africa. This species is #218. The 'Larsen' numbers have since been used with permission in A Sharp Eye on Butterflies of Ghana.
