= Liptena tiassale =

Scientific classification
- Kingdom: Animalia
- Phylum: Arthropoda
- Clade: Pancrustacea
- Class: Insecta
- Order: Lepidoptera
- Family: Lycaenidae
- Genus: Liptena
- Species: L. tiassale

Binomial name
- Liptena tiassale Stempffer, 1969

Species of butterfly

Liptena tiassale, the Tiassale liptena, is a butterfly in the family Lycaenidae. It is found in Ivory Coast and Ghana.The habitat consists of open forests.

Torben Larsen developed a species numbering system for his 2005 publication Butterflies of West Africa. This species is #222. The 'Larsen' numbers have since been used with permission in A Sharp Eye on Butterflies of Ghana.
