= Liptena septistrigata =

Scientific classification
- Kingdom: Animalia
- Phylum: Arthropoda
- Clade: Pancrustacea
- Class: Insecta
- Order: Lepidoptera
- Family: Lycaenidae
- Genus: Liptena
- Species: L. septistrigata

Binomial name
- Liptena septistrigata (Bethune-Baker, 1903)

Synonyms
- Pentila septistrigata Bethune-Baker, 1903

Species of butterfly

Liptena septistrigata, the seven-striped liptena, is a butterfly in the family Lycaenidae. It is found in Guinea, Sierra Leone, Ivory Coast, Ghana, Togo, southern Nigeria and western Cameroon. The habitat consists of forests.

Torben Larsen developed a species numbering system for his 2005 publication Butterflies of West Africa. This species is #231. The 'Larsen' numbers have since been used with permission in A Sharp Eye on Butterflies of Ghana.
