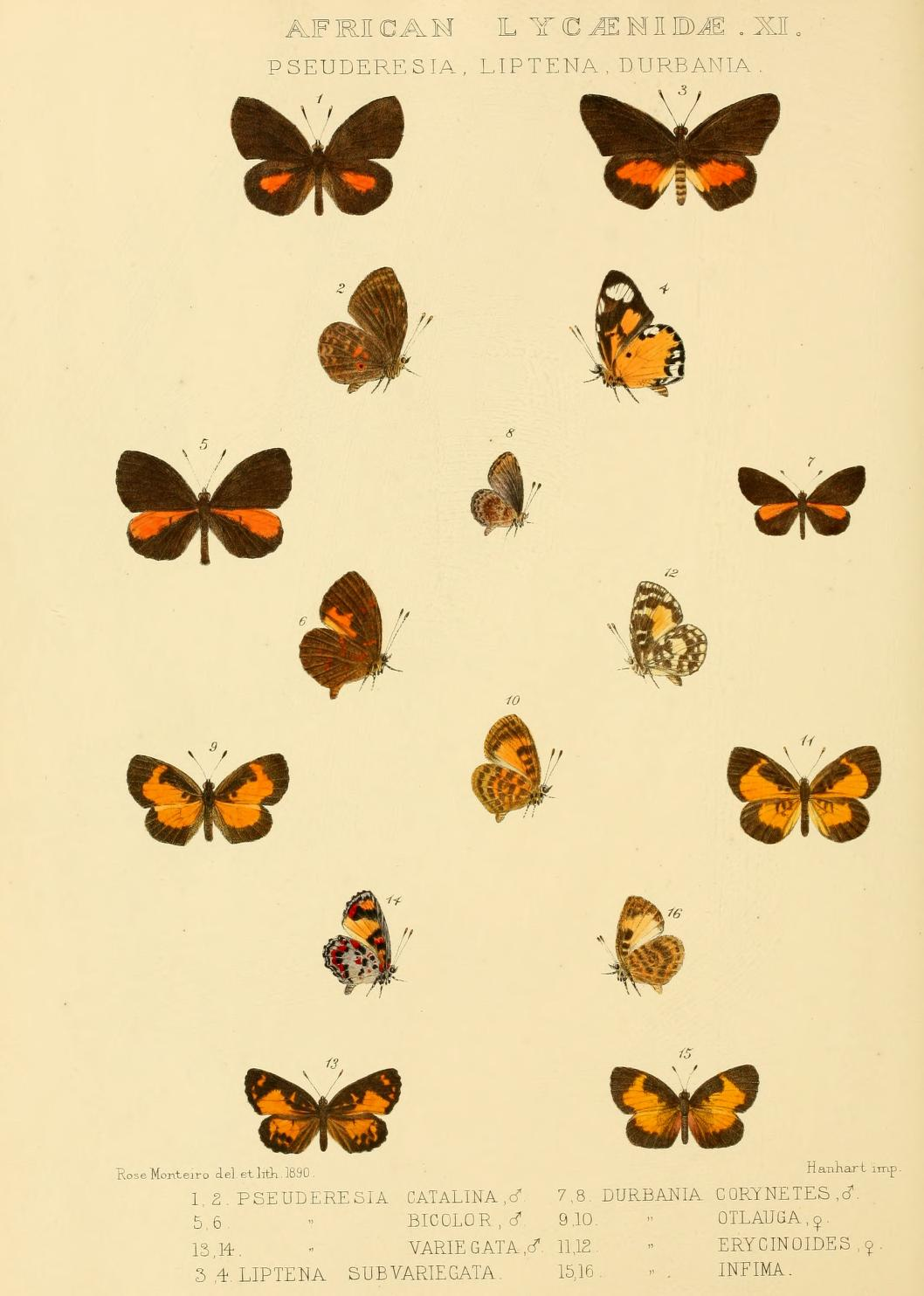

Scientific classification
- Kingdom: Animalia
- Phylum: Arthropoda
- Clade: Pancrustacea
- Class: Insecta
- Order: Lepidoptera
- Family: Lycaenidae
- Genus: Liptena
- Species: L. helena

Binomial name
- Liptena helena (H. H. Druce, 1888)

Synonyms
- Pseuderesia helena H. H. Druce, 1888; Durbania erycinoides Grose-Smith and Kirby, 1890

= Liptena helena =

Species of butterfly

Liptena helena, the red-spot false dots, is a butterfly in the family Lycaenidae. The species was first described by Hamilton Herbert Druce in 1888. It is found in Guinea, Sierra Leone, Liberia, Ivory Coast and Ghana. The habitat consist of forests.
