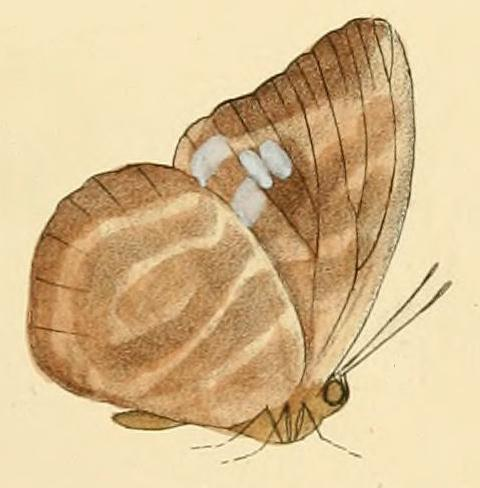

Scientific classification
- Kingdom: Animalia
- Phylum: Arthropoda
- Clade: Pancrustacea
- Class: Insecta
- Order: Lepidoptera
- Family: Lycaenidae
- Subfamily: Poritiinae
- Genus: Phytala; Westwood, 1851
- Species: P. elais

Binomial name
- Phytala elais Westwood, 1851

Synonyms
- Phytala elaidina Strand, 1920

= Phytala =

Monotypic butterfly genus in family Lycaenidae

Phytala is a genus of butterflies in the family Lycaenidae endemic to the Afrotropical realm. The single species of this genus, Phytala elais, the giant forest blue, is found in Sierra Leone, Liberia, Ivory Coast, Ghana, Nigeria, Cameroon, Gabon, the Republic of the Congo, the Democratic Republic of the Congo, Sudan and Uganda. The habitat consists of forests.

== Subspecies ==
- Phytala elais elais (eastern Ivory Coast, Ghana, Nigeria: south and the Cross River loop, Cameroon, Gabon, Congo)
- Phytala elais catori Bethune-Baker, 1903 (Sierra Leone, Liberia, western Ivory Coast)
- Phytala elais ugandae Jackson, 1964 (Democratic Republic of the Congo, southern Sudan, Uganda)

Torben Larsen developed a species numbering system for his 2005 publication Butterflies of West Africa. The nominate subspecies is #314. The 'Larsen' numbers have since been used with permission in A Sharp Eye on Butterflies of Ghana.
