= Liptena seyboui =

Scientific classification
- Kingdom: Animalia
- Phylum: Arthropoda
- Class: Insecta
- Order: Lepidoptera
- Family: Lycaenidae
- Genus: Liptena
- Species: L. seyboui

Binomial name
- Liptena seyboui Warren-Gash & Larsen, 2003

Species of butterfly

Liptena seyboui, the Seybou's ochre liptena, is a butterfly in the family Lycaenidae. It is found in eastern Ivory Coast and western Ghana. The habitat consists of dense primary forests.
