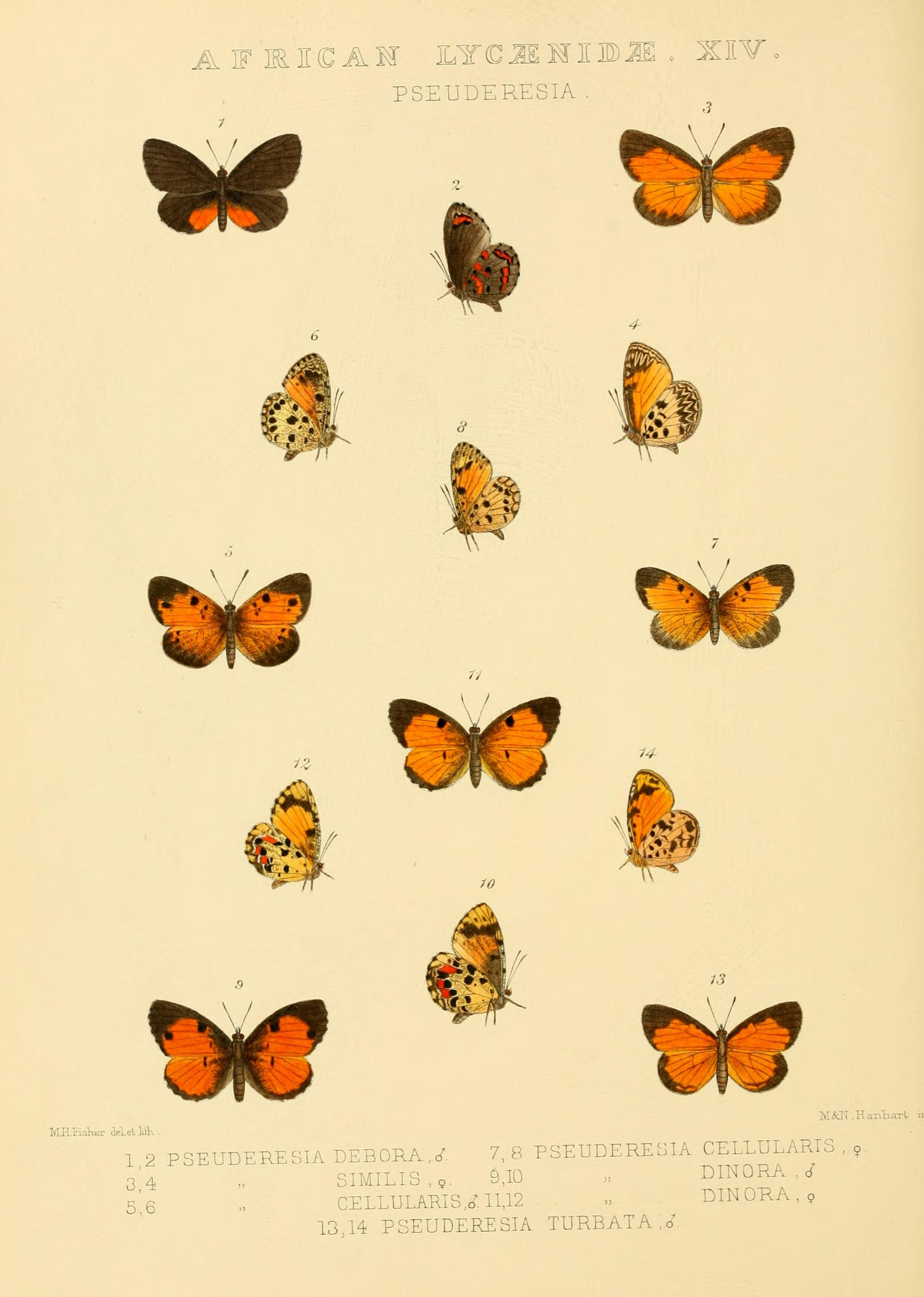

Scientific classification
- Kingdom: Animalia
- Phylum: Arthropoda
- Clade: Pancrustacea
- Class: Insecta
- Order: Lepidoptera
- Family: Lycaenidae
- Genus: Liptena
- Species: L. similis

Binomial name
- Liptena similis (Kirby, 1890)

Synonyms
- Pseuderesia similis Kirby, 1890; Durbania olombo Holland, 1890

= Liptena similis =

Species of butterfly

Liptena similis, the similar liptena, is a butterfly in the family Lycaenidae. It is found in Guinea, Sierra Leone, Liberia, Ivory Coast, Ghana, Nigeria, Cameroon and Gabon.

Torben Larsen developed a species numbering system for his 2005 publication Butterflies of West Africa. This species is #240. The 'Larsen' numbers have since been used with permission in A Sharp Eye on Butterflies of Ghana.
