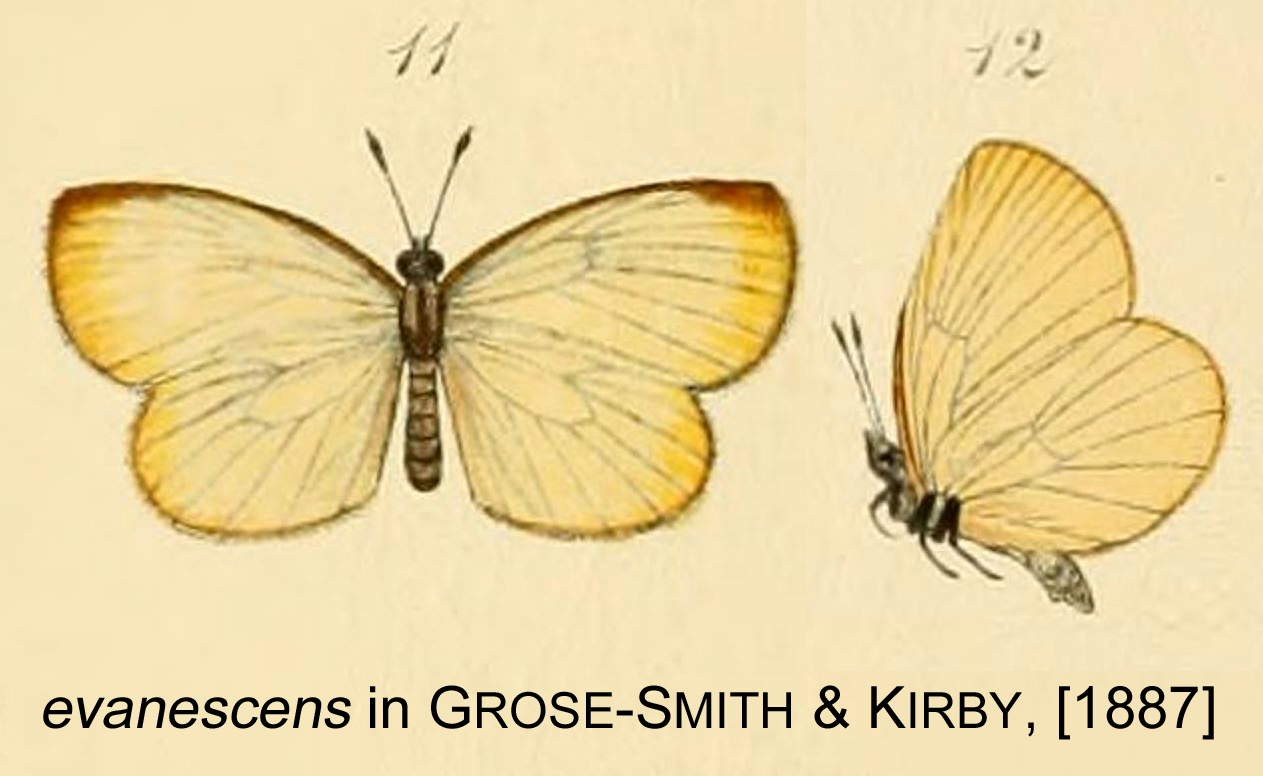

Scientific classification
- Kingdom: Animalia
- Phylum: Arthropoda
- Class: Insecta
- Order: Lepidoptera
- Family: Lycaenidae
- Genus: Liptena
- Species: L. evanescens

Binomial name
- Liptena evanescens (Kirby, 1887)

Synonyms
- Pentila evanescens Kirby, 1887; Teriomima xanthis Holland, 1890

= Liptena evanescens =

Species of butterfly

Liptena evanescens, the pink liptena, is a butterfly in the family Lycaenidae. It is found in eastern Ivory Coast, Ghana, Nigeria (south and the Cross River loop), Cameroon, Bioko, Sao Tome and Gabon. The habitat consists of forests.
