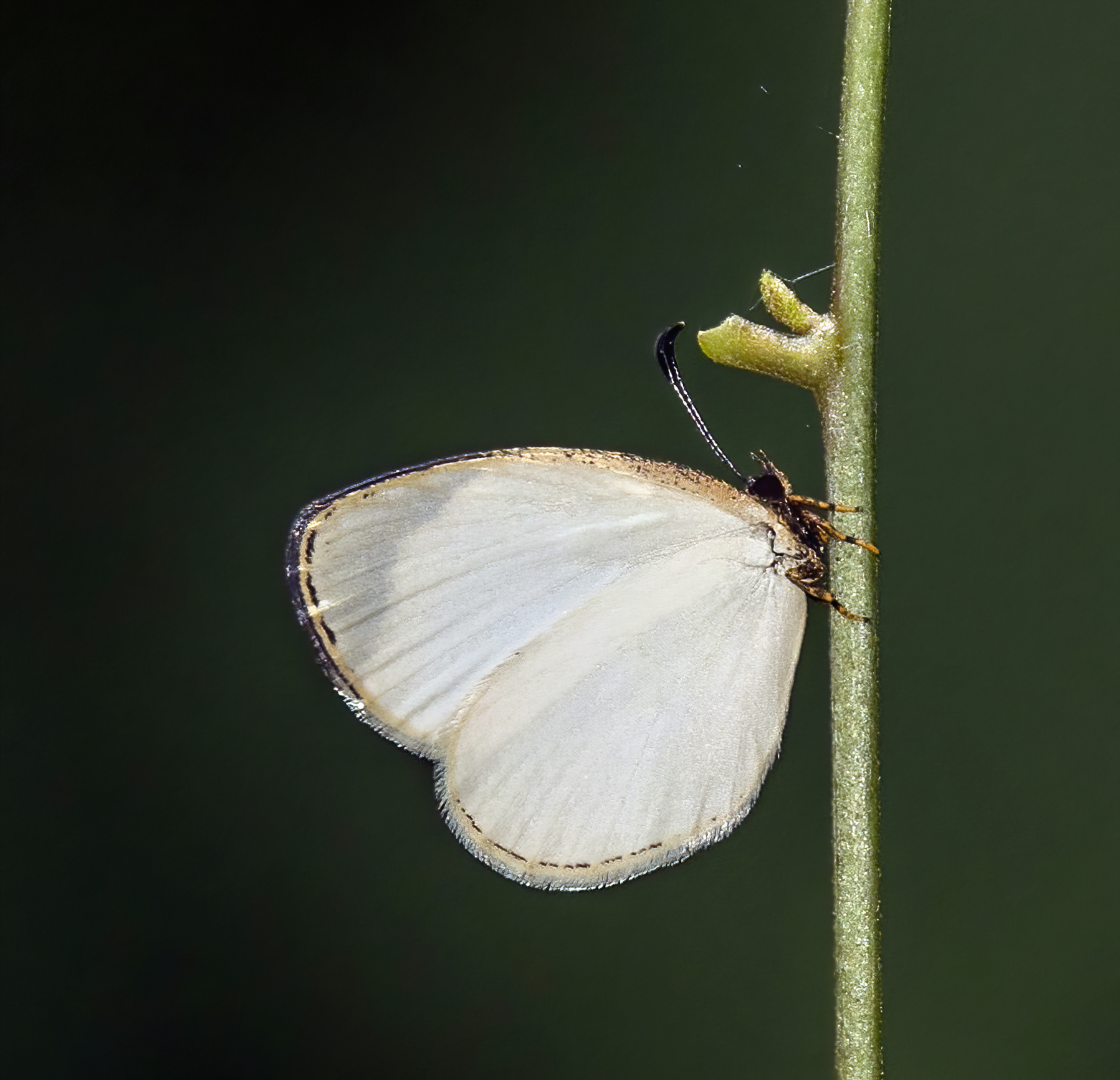
- in Ghana

Scientific classification
- Kingdom: Animalia
- Phylum: Arthropoda
- Clade: Pancrustacea
- Class: Insecta
- Order: Lepidoptera
- Family: Lycaenidae
- Genus: Liptena
- Species: L. alluaudi

Binomial name
- Liptena alluaudi Mabille, 1890

= Liptena alluaudi =

Species of butterfly

Liptena alluaudi, the Alluaud's liptena, is a butterfly in the family Lycaenidae. It is found in Guinea (Nimbas), Liberia, Ivory Coast, Ghana, Togo and western Nigeria. The habitat consists of forests. The name honours Charles Alluaud.

Torben Larsen developed a species numbering system for his 2005 publication Butterflies of West Africa. This species is #225. The 'Larsen' numbers have since been used with permission in A Sharp Eye on Butterflies of Ghana.
