= Liptena titei =

Scientific classification
- Kingdom: Animalia
- Phylum: Arthropoda
- Clade: Pancrustacea
- Class: Insecta
- Order: Lepidoptera
- Family: Lycaenidae
- Genus: Liptena
- Species: L. titei

Binomial name
- Liptena titei Stempffer, Bennett & May, 1974

Species of butterfly

Liptena titei, the Tite's liptena, is a butterfly in the family Lycaenidae. It is found in Nigeria (east and the Cross River loop), western Cameroon and possibly Ivory Coast. The habitat consists of forests.
