= Liptena griveaudi =

Scientific classification
- Kingdom: Animalia
- Phylum: Arthropoda
- Class: Insecta
- Order: Lepidoptera
- Family: Lycaenidae
- Genus: Liptena
- Species: L. griveaudi

Binomial name
- Liptena griveaudi Stempffer, 1969

Species of butterfly

Liptena griveaudi, the Griveaud's liptena, is a butterfly in the family Lycaenidae. It is found in Guinea, Liberia, Ivory Coast and Ghana. The habitat consists of forests.
