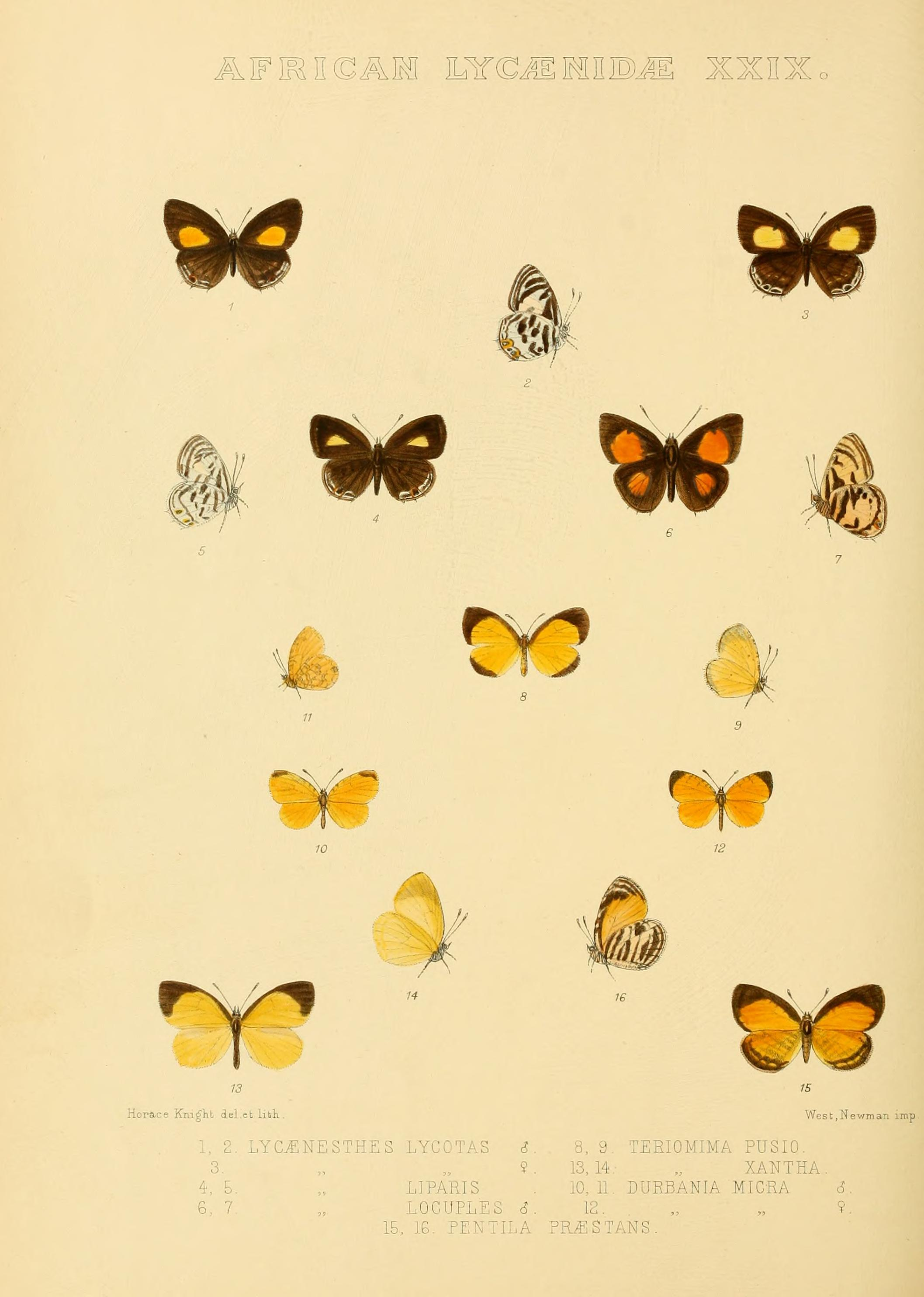
- Figures 15 and 16

Scientific classification
- Kingdom: Animalia
- Phylum: Arthropoda
- Clade: Pancrustacea
- Class: Insecta
- Order: Lepidoptera
- Family: Lycaenidae
- Genus: Liptena
- Species: L. praestans

Binomial name
- Liptena praestans (Grose-Smith, 1901)

Synonyms
- Pentila praestans Grose-Smith, 1901; Liptena praestans var. congoensis Schultze, 1923; Liptena hulstaerti Hawker-Smith, 1926; Liptena praestans f. kamitugensis Dufrane, 1945

= Liptena praestans =

Species of butterfly

Liptena praestans is a butterfly in the family Lycaenidae. It is found in Cameroon, the Republic of the Congo, the Democratic Republic of the Congo, Uganda, Tanzania, Zambia and possibly Sierra Leone and Ivory Coast.

== Subspecies ==
- Liptena praestans praestans (Sierra Leone)
- Liptena praestans bia (Sierra Leone to Ghana) Larsen & Warren-Gash, 2008
- Liptena praestans congoensis Schultze, 1923 (southern Cameroon, Congo, Uganda, north-western Tanzania, north-western Zambia, Democratic Republic of the Congo: Kinshasa, Equateur, Tshuapa, Haut-Uele, Kivu, Sankuru and Lualaba)

Torben Larsen developed a species numbering system for his 2005 publication Butterflies of West Africa. This species, originally described by Larsen as Liptena bia, is #236. The 'Larsen' numbers have since been used with permission in A Sharp Eye on Butterflies of Ghana.
