= List of butterflies of Senegal =

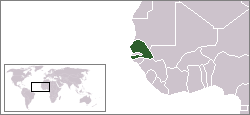
Location of Senegal

This is a list of butterflies of Senegal. About 297 species are known from Senegal, one of which is endemic.

== Papilionidae ==
=== Papilioninae ===
==== Papilionini ====
- Papilio nireus Linnaeus, 1758
- Papilio dardanus Brown, 1776
- Papilio demodocus Esper, [1798]
- Papilio menestheus Drury, 1773

==== Leptocercini ====
- Graphium antheus (Cramer, 1779)
- Graphium angolanus baronis (Ungemach, 1932)
- Graphium leonidas (Fabricius, 1793)
- Graphium auriger (Butler, 1876)

== Pieridae ==
=== Coliadinae ===
- Eurema brigitta (Stoll, [1780])
- Eurema desjardinsii marshalli (Butler, 1898)
- Eurema regularis (Butler, 1876)
- Eurema hecabe solifera (Butler, 1875)
- Catopsilia florella (Fabricius, 1775)

=== Pierinae ===
- Colotis amata calais (Cramer, 1775)
- Colotis antevippe (Boisduval, 1836)
- Colotis aurora evarne (Klug, 1829)
- Colotis celimene sudanicus (Aurivillius, 1905)
- Colotis chrysonome (Klug, 1829)
- Colotis danae eupompe (Klug, 1829)
- Colotis euippe (Linnaeus, 1758)
- Colotis evagore antigone (Boisduval, 1836)
- Colotis halimede (Klug, 1829)
- Colotis ione (Godart, 1819)
- Colotis liagore (Klug, 1829)
- Colotis phisadia (Godart, 1819)
- Colotis vesta amelia (Lucas, 1852)
- Colotis eris (Klug, 1829)
- Pinacopterix eriphia tritogenia (Klug, 1829)
- Nepheronia argia (Fabricius, 1775)
- Nepheronia buquetii (Boisduval, 1836)
- Nepheronia thalassina (Boisduval, 1836)
- Leptosia alcesta (Stoll, [1782])
- Leptosia wigginsi pseudalcesta Bernardi, 1965

==== Pierini ====
- Appias epaphia (Cramer, [1779])
- Appias sylvia (Fabricius, 1775)
- Pontia glauconome Klug, 1829
- Mylothris aburi Larsen & Collins, 2003
- Mylothris chloris (Fabricius, 1775)
- Dixeia doxo (Godart, 1819)
- Dixeia orbona (Geyer, [1837])
- Belenois aurota (Fabricius, 1793)
- Belenois calypso (Drury, 1773)
- Belenois creona (Cramer, [1776])
- Belenois gidica (Godart, 1819)

== Lycaenidae ==
=== Miletinae ===
==== Liphyrini ====
- Euliphyra hewitsoni Aurivillius, 1899

==== Miletini ====
- Spalgis lemolea lemolea Druce, 1890
- Spalgis lemolea pilos Druce, 1890
- Lachnocnema emperamus (Snellen, 1872)
- Lachnocnema vuattouxi Libert, 1996

=== Poritiinae ===
==== Liptenini ====
- Pentila condamini Stempffer, 1963
- Pentila pauli abri Collins & Larsen, 2001 (manuscript name)
- Pentila preussi fayei Stempffer, 1963
- Eresina maesseni Stempffer, 1956

==== Epitolini ====
- Cephetola subcoerulea (Roche, 1954)

=== Aphnaeinae ===
- Pseudaletis leonis (Staudinger, 1888)
- Cigaritis mozambica (Bertoloni, 1850)
- Cigaritis nilus (Hewitson, 1865)
- Zeritis neriene Boisduval, 1836
- Axiocerses harpax harpax (Fabricius, 1775)
- Axiocerses harpax kadugli Talbot, 1935
- Axiocerses amanga borealis Aurivillius, 1905
- Aphnaeus brahami Lathy, 1903
- Aphnaeus orcas (Drury, 1782)

=== Theclinae ===
- Myrina silenus (Fabricius, 1775)
- Myrina subornata Lathy, 1903
- Dapidodigma hymen (Fabricius, 1775)
- Hypolycaena condamini Stempffer, 1956
- Hypolycaena philippus (Fabricius, 1793)
- Iolaus eurisus helius (Fabricius, 1781)
- Iolaus alienus bicaudatus Aurivillius, 1905
- Iolaus iasis Hewitson, 1865
- Iolaus scintillans Aurivillius, 1905
- Iolaus sudanicus Aurivillius, 1905
- Iolaus menas Druce, 1890
- Iolaus iulus Hewitson, 1869
- Iolaus ismenias (Klug, 1834)
- Iolaus calisto (Westwood, 1851)
- Stugeta marmoreus (Butler, 1866)
- Pilodeudorix catori (Bethune-Baker, 1903)
- Pilodeudorix caerulea (Druce, 1890)
- Pilodeudorix diyllus occidentalis Libert, 2004
- Pilodeudorix zela (Hewitson, 1869)
- Deudorix antalus (Hopffer, 1855)
- Deudorix dinochares Grose-Smith, 1887
- Deudorix dinomenes diomedes Jackson, 1966
- Deudorix galathea (Swainson, 1821)
- Deudorix livia (Klug, 1834)
- Deudorix lorisona abriana Libert, 2004
- Deudorix odana Druce, 1887

=== Polyommatinae ===
==== Lycaenesthini ====
- Anthene amarah (Guérin-Méneville, 1849)
- Anthene crawshayi (Butler, 1899)
- Anthene larydas (Cramer, 1780)
- Anthene liodes (Hewitson, 1874)
- Anthene lunulata (Trimen, 1894)
- Anthene princeps (Butler, 1876)
- Anthene sylvanus (Drury, 1773)
- Anthene phoenicis (Karsch, 1893)

==== Polyommatini ====
- Cupidopsis cissus (Godart, [1824])
- Cupidopsis jobates mauritanica Riley, 1932
- Pseudonacaduba sichela (Wallengren, 1857)
- Lampides boeticus (Linnaeus, 1767)
- Cacyreus virilis Stempffer, 1936
- Leptotes babaulti (Stempffer, 1935)
- Leptotes jeanneli (Stempffer, 1935)
- Leptotes pirithous (Linnaeus, 1767)
- Leptotes pulchra (Murray, 1874)
- Tuxentius cretosus nodieri (Oberthür, 1883)
- Tarucus legrasi Stempffer, 1948
- Tarucus rosacea (Austaut, 1885)
- Tarucus theophrastus (Fabricius, 1793)
- Tarucus ungemachi Stempffer, 1942
- Zizeeria knysna (Trimen, 1862)
- Zizina antanossa (Mabille, 1877)
- Zizula hylax (Fabricius, 1775)
- Azanus jesous (Guérin-Méneville, 1849)
- Azanus mirza (Plötz, 1880)
- Azanus moriqua (Wallengren, 1857)
- Azanus natalensis (Trimen & Bowker, 1887)
- Azanus ubaldus (Stoll, 1782)
- Azanus isis (Drury, 1773)
- Eicochrysops hippocrates (Fabricius, 1793)
- Euchrysops barkeri (Trimen, 1893)
- Euchrysops malathana (Boisduval, 1833)
- Euchrysops nilotica (Aurivillius, 1904)
- Euchrysops osiris (Hopffer, 1855)
- Euchrysops reducta Hulstaert, 1924
- Euchrysops sahelianus Libert, 2001
- Oboronia guessfeldti (Dewitz, 1879)
- Chilades eleusis (Demaison, 1888)
- Chilades serrula (Mabille, 1890) (endemic)
- Freyeria trochylus (Freyer, [1843])
- Lepidochrysops polydialecta (Bethune-Baker, [1923])
- Lepidochrysops synchrematiza (Bethune-Baker, [1923])

== Nymphalidae ==
=== Danainae ===
==== Danaini ====
- Danaus chrysippus alcippus (Cramer, 1777)
- Tirumala petiverana (Doubleday, 1847)
- Amauris damocles (Fabricius, 1793)

=== Satyrinae ===
==== Elymniini ====
- Elymniopsis bammakoo (Westwood, [1851])

==== Melanitini ====
- Melanitis leda (Linnaeus, 1758)
- Melanitis libya Distant, 1882

==== Satyrini ====
- Bicyclus angulosa (Butler, 1868)
- Bicyclus funebris (Guérin-Méneville, 1844)
- Bicyclus mandanes Hewitson, 1873
- Bicyclus milyas (Hewitson, 1864)
- Bicyclus pavonis (Butler, 1876)
- Bicyclus safitza (Westwood, 1850)
- Bicyclus sandace (Hewitson, 1877)
- Bicyclus taenias (Hewitson, 1877)
- Bicyclus vulgaris (Butler, 1868)
- Bicyclus zinebi (Butler, 1869)
- Ypthima asterope (Klug, 1832)
- Ypthima condamini nigeriae Kielland, 1982
- Ypthima doleta Kirby, 1880
- Ypthima impura Elwes & Edwards, 1893
- Ypthima vuattouxi Kielland, 1982
- Ypthimomorpha itonia (Hewitson, 1865)

=== Charaxinae ===
==== Charaxini ====
- Charaxes varanes vologeses (Mabille, 1876)
- Charaxes fulvescens senegala van Someren, 1975
- Charaxes candiope (Godart, 1824)
- Charaxes protoclea Feisthamel, 1850
- Charaxes boueti Feisthamel, 1850
- Charaxes cynthia Butler, 1866
- Charaxes lucretius Cramer, [1775]
- Charaxes jasius Poulton, 1926
- Charaxes epijasius Reiche, 1850
- Charaxes castor (Cramer, 1775)
- Charaxes brutus (Cramer, 1779)
- Charaxes numenes (Hewitson, 1859)
- Charaxes tiridates (Cramer, 1777)
- Charaxes zingha (Stoll, 1780)
- Charaxes etesipe (Godart, 1824)
- Charaxes achaemenes atlantica van Someren, 1970
- Charaxes eupale (Drury, 1782)
- Charaxes anticlea (Drury, 1782)
- Charaxes etheocles (Cramer, 1777)
- Charaxes viola Butler, 1866

==== Euxanthini ====
- Charaxes eurinome (Cramer, 1775)

==== Pallini ====
- Palla decius (Cramer, 1777)

=== Nymphalinae ===
==== Nymphalini ====
- Antanartia delius (Drury, 1782)
- Vanessa cardui (Linnaeus, 1758)
- Junonia chorimene (Guérin-Méneville, 1844)
- Junonia hierta cebrene Trimen, 1870
- Junonia oenone (Linnaeus, 1758)
- Junonia orithya madagascariensis Guenée, 1865
- Junonia sophia (Fabricius, 1793)
- Junonia stygia (Aurivillius, 1894)
- Junonia terea (Drury, 1773)
- Salamis cacta (Fabricius, 1793)
- Precis antilope (Feisthamel, 1850)
- Precis octavia (Cramer, 1777)
- Precis pelarga (Fabricius, 1775)
- Hypolimnas anthedon (Doubleday, 1845)
- Hypolimnas misippus (Linnaeus, 1764)
- Catacroptera cloanthe ligata Rothschild & Jordan, 1903

=== Cyrestinae ===
==== Cyrestini ====
- Cyrestis camillus (Fabricius, 1781)

=== Biblidinae ===
==== Biblidini ====
- Byblia anvatara crameri Aurivillius, 1894
- Byblia ilithyia (Drury, 1773)

=== Limenitinae ===
==== Limenitidini ====
- Pseudacraea eurytus (Linnaeus, 1758)
- Pseudacraea lucretia (Cramer, [1775])
- Pseudacraea warburgi Aurivillius, 1892

==== Neptidini ====
- Neptis agouale Pierre-Baltus, 1978
- Neptis alta Overlaet, 1955
- Neptis najo Karsch, 1893
- Neptis kiriakoffi Overlaet, 1955
- Neptis morosa Overlaet, 1955
- Neptis nemetes Hewitson, 1868
- Neptis nysiades Hewitson, 1868
- Neptis serena Overlaet, 1955
- Neptis trigonophora melicertula Strand, 1912

==== Adoliadini ====
- Euryphura chalcis (Felder & Felder, 1860)
- Hamanumida daedalus (Fabricius, 1775)
- Aterica galene (Brown, 1776)
- Euriphene ampedusa (Hewitson, 1866)
- Euriphene gambiae Feisthamel, 1850
- Bebearia senegalensis (Herrich-Schaeffer, 1858)
- Bebearia sophus phreone (Feisthamel, 1850)
- Bebearia phantasina ultima Hecq, 1990
- Euphaedra medon pholus (van der Hoeven, 1840)
- Euphaedra hastiri Hecq, 1981
- Euphaedra laguerrei Hecq, 1979
- Euphaedra villiersi Condamin, 1964

=== Heliconiinae ===
==== Acraeini ====
- Acraea camaena (Drury, 1773)
- Acraea neobule Doubleday, 1847
- Acraea quirina (Fabricius, 1781)
- Acraea zetes (Linnaeus, 1758)
- Acraea egina (Cramer, 1775)
- Acraea caecilia (Fabricius, 1781)
- Acraea pseudegina Westwood, 1852
- Acraea epaea (Cramer, 1779)
- Acraea macaria (Fabricius, 1793)
- Acraea vestalis Felder & Felder, 1865
- Acraea bonasia (Fabricius, 1775)
- Acraea encedana Pierre, 1976
- Acraea encedon (Linnaeus, 1758)
- Acraea serena (Fabricius, 1775)
- Acraea perenna Doubleday, 1847

==== Vagrantini ====
- Lachnoptera anticlia (Hübner, 1819)
- Phalanta phalantha aethiopica (Rothschild & Jordan, 1903)

== Hesperiidae ==
=== Coeliadinae ===
- Coeliades aeschylus (Plötz, 1884)
- Coeliades chalybe (Westwood, 1852)
- Coeliades forestan (Stoll, [1782])
- Coeliades hanno (Plötz, 1879)

=== Pyrginae ===
==== Celaenorrhinini ====
- Celaenorrhinus galenus (Fabricius, 1793)
- Eretis lugens (Rogenhofer, 1891)
- Sarangesa laelius (Mabille, 1877)
- Sarangesa phidyle (Walker, 1870)

==== Tagiadini ====
- Tagiades flesus (Fabricius, 1781)
- Eagris denuba (Plötz, 1879)
- Caprona adelica Karsch, 1892
- Abantis nigeriana Butler, 1901
- Abantis pseudonigeriana Usher, 1984

==== Carcharodini ====
- Spialia diomus (Hopffer, 1855)
- Spialia dromus (Plötz, 1884)
- Spialia spio (Linnaeus, 1764)
- Gomalia elma (Trimen, 1862)

=== Hesperiinae ===
==== Aeromachini ====
- Astictopterus abjecta (Snellen, 1872)
- Prosopalpus debilis (Plötz, 1879)
- Prosopalpus styla Evans, 1937
- Gorgyra afikpo Druce, 1909
- Pardaleodes edipus (Stoll, 1781)
- Pardaleodes incerta murcia (Plötz, 1883)
- Xanthodisca rega (Mabille, 1890)
- Parosmodes morantii axis Evans, 1937
- Acleros mackenii olaus (Plötz, 1884)
- Acleros ploetzi Mabille, 1890
- Semalea arela (Mabille, 1891)
- Semalea pulvina (Plötz, 1879)
- Hypoleucis ophiusa (Hewitson, 1866)
- Meza indusiata (Mabille, 1891)
- Meza leucophaea (Holland, 1894)
- Meza meza (Hewitson, 1877)
- Andronymus neander (Plötz, 1884)
- Zophopetes cerymica (Hewitson, 1867)
- Zophopetes quaternata (Mabille, 1876)
- Artitropa comus (Stoll, 1782)
- Gretna waga (Plötz, 1886)
- Leona halma Evans, 1937
- Caenides dacela (Hewitson, 1876)
- Monza alberti (Holland, 1896)
- Fresna cojo (Karsch, 1893)
- Platylesches affinissima Strand, 1921
- Platylesches batangae (Holland, 1894)
- Platylesches chamaeleon (Mabille, 1891)
- Platylesches galesa (Hewitson, 1877)
- Platylesches moritili (Wallengren, 1857)
- Platylesches picanini (Holland, 1894)
- Platylesches rossii Belcastro, 1986

==== Baorini ====
- Pelopidas mathias (Fabricius, 1798)
- Pelopidas thrax (Hübner, 1821)
- Borbo borbonica (Boisduval, 1833)
- Borbo fatuellus (Hopffer, 1855)
- Borbo gemella (Mabille, 1884)
- Borbo holtzi (Plötz, 1883)
- Borbo perobscura (Druce, 1912)
- Parnara monasi (Trimen & Bowker, 1889)
- Gegenes hottentota (Latreille, 1824)
- Gegenes niso brevicornis (Plötz, 1884)
- Gegenes nostrodamus (Fabricius, 1793)
- Gegenes pumilio gambica (Mabille, 1878)

== See also ==
- List of moths of Senegal
- Wildlife of Senegal
