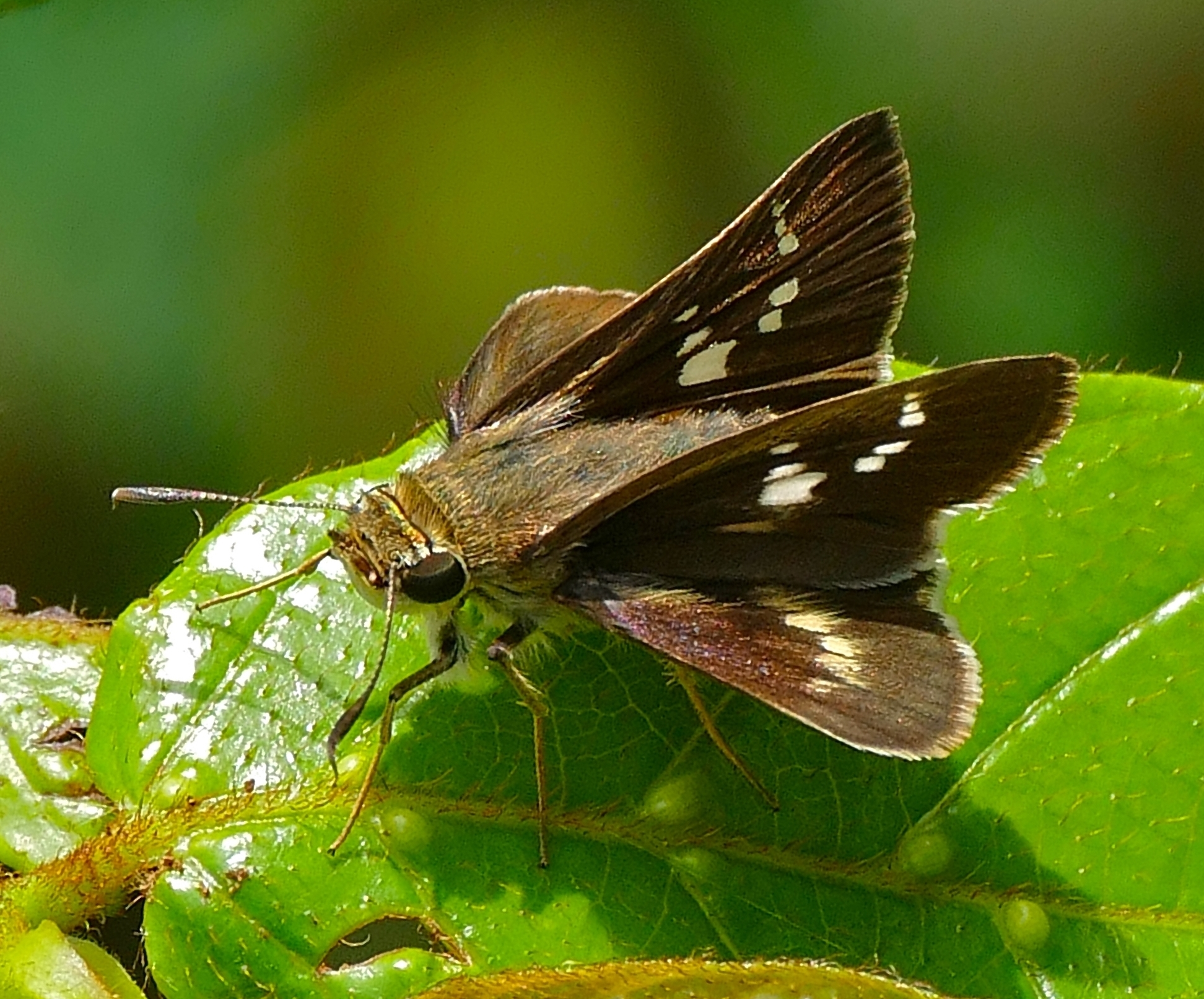

Scientific classification
- Kingdom: Animalia
- Phylum: Arthropoda
- Clade: Pancrustacea
- Class: Insecta
- Order: Lepidoptera
- Family: Hesperiidae
- Genus: Platylesches
- Species: P. neba

Binomial name
- Platylesches neba (Hewitson, 1877)

Synonyms
- Hesperia neba Hewitson, 1877

= Platylesches neba =

Flower-girl hopper

Species of butterfly

Platylesches neba, the flower-girl hopper, is a butterfly of the family Hesperiidae. It is found in Zululand, Transvaal, Zimbabwe and south-western Africa. The habitat consists of moist and dry savanna.

The wingspan is 29–34 mm for males and 31–35 mm for females. Adults are on wing year-round with peaks from September to October and from February to April. They are attracted to flowers and mud puddles.

The larvae feed on Parinari capensis and Parinari curatellifolia.
