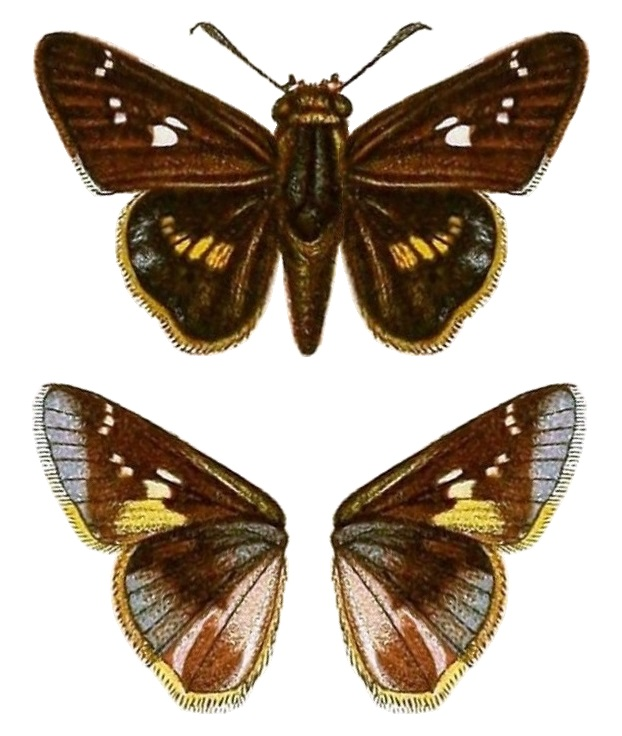

Scientific classification
- Domain: Eukaryota
- Kingdom: Animalia
- Phylum: Arthropoda
- Class: Insecta
- Order: Lepidoptera
- Family: Hesperiidae
- Genus: Platylesches
- Species: P. robustus

Binomial name
- Platylesches robustus Neave, 1910

Synonyms
- Platylesches ertli Gaede, 1917; Platylesches villa Evans, 1937

= Platylesches robustus =

Robust hopper

Species of butterfly

Platylesches robustus, the robust hopper or large hopper, is a butterfly of the family Hesperiidae. It is found in Zululand, Eswatini, Transvaal, Mozambique and Zimbabwe. The habitat consists of moist, frost-free savanna and the transitional zone between forest and Guinea savanna.

The wingspan is 34–42 mm for males and 36–44 mm for females. Adults are on wing from August to October and from March to April and occasionally also in midsummer. There are two generations per year. Adults feed from flowers on trees and visit muddy patches.

The larvae probably feed on Parinari curatellifolia. They are salmon pink with small creamy white spots and a golden-brown head with darker brown stripes. The larvae built a shelter from the leaves of their host plant.

== Subspecies ==
- Platylesches robustus robustus (Democratic Republic of the Congo: Shaba, Rwanda, south-western Tanzania, Malawi, northern Zambia, Mozambique, Zimbabwe and from Eswatini to KwaZulu-Natal, the lowveld of Mpumalanga and the Limpopo Province)
- Platylesches robustus fofi Larsen & Mei, 1998 (Guinea)
- Platylesches robustus villa Evans, 1937 (southern Cameroon)
