= Platylesches dolomitica =

Scientific classification
- Domain: Eukaryota
- Kingdom: Animalia
- Phylum: Arthropoda
- Class: Insecta
- Order: Lepidoptera
- Family: Hesperiidae
- Genus: Platylesches
- Species: P. dolomitica

Binomial name
- Platylesches dolomitica Henning & Henning, 1997

Species of butterfly

Platylesches dolomitica, the hilltop hopper, is a butterfly of the family Hesperiidae. It is only known from dolomite ridges near Steelpoort in Mpumalanga, Horns Nek near Pretoria and Carletonville in Gauteng. The habitat consists of dolomite ridges in bushveld and sour grassland.

The wingspan is 32–35 mm for males and 33–37 mm for females. Adults are on wing from August to September. There is one generation per year.

The larvae probably feed on Parinari capensis.
