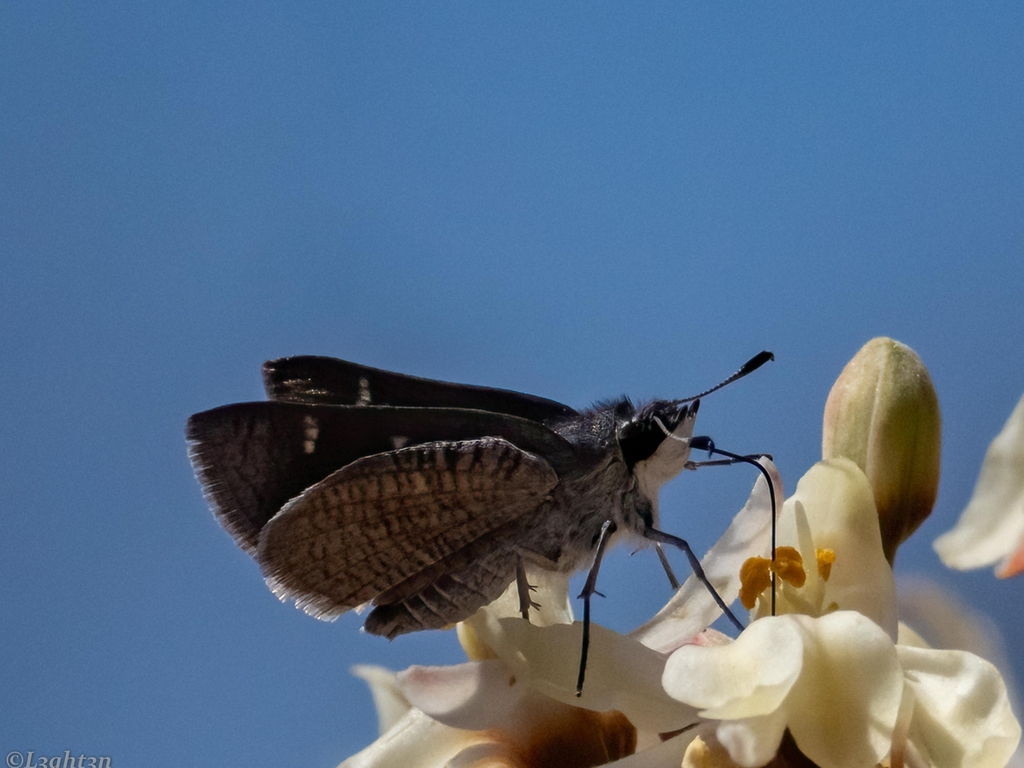

Scientific classification
- Kingdom: Animalia
- Phylum: Arthropoda
- Clade: Pancrustacea
- Class: Insecta
- Order: Lepidoptera
- Family: Hesperiidae
- Genus: Platylesches
- Species: P. ayresii

Binomial name
- Platylesches ayresii (Trimen, 1889)

Synonyms
- Pamphila ayresii Trimen, 1889

= Platylesches ayresii =

Species of butterfly

Platylesches ayresii, the peppered hopper, is a butterfly of the family Hesperiidae. It is found in bushveld in Botswana, western Transvaal, KwaZulu-Natal, Mozambique and Zimbabwe. The habitat consists of dry savanna and grassland.

The wingspan is 27–32 mm for males and 35–38 mm for females. Adults are on wing from July to April.

The larvae feed on Parinari capensis.
