= Platylesches tina =

Small hopper

Scientific classification
- Domain: Eukaryota
- Kingdom: Animalia
- Phylum: Arthropoda
- Class: Insecta
- Order: Lepidoptera
- Family: Hesperiidae
- Genus: Platylesches
- Species: P. tina

Binomial name
- Platylesches tina Evans, 1937

Species of butterfly

Platylesches tina, the small hopper, is a butterfly of the family Hesperiidae. It is found in Uganda, western Kenya, Malawi, Zambia, Zimbabwe, Namibia (Caprivi) and the Transvaal. The habitat consists of well-wooded savanna and riverine vegetation.

The wingspan is 25–29 mm. The flight period is from September to October and January to April, with two broods. Adults mud-puddle, feed from bird droppings and have been recorded feeding from the flowers of trees.
