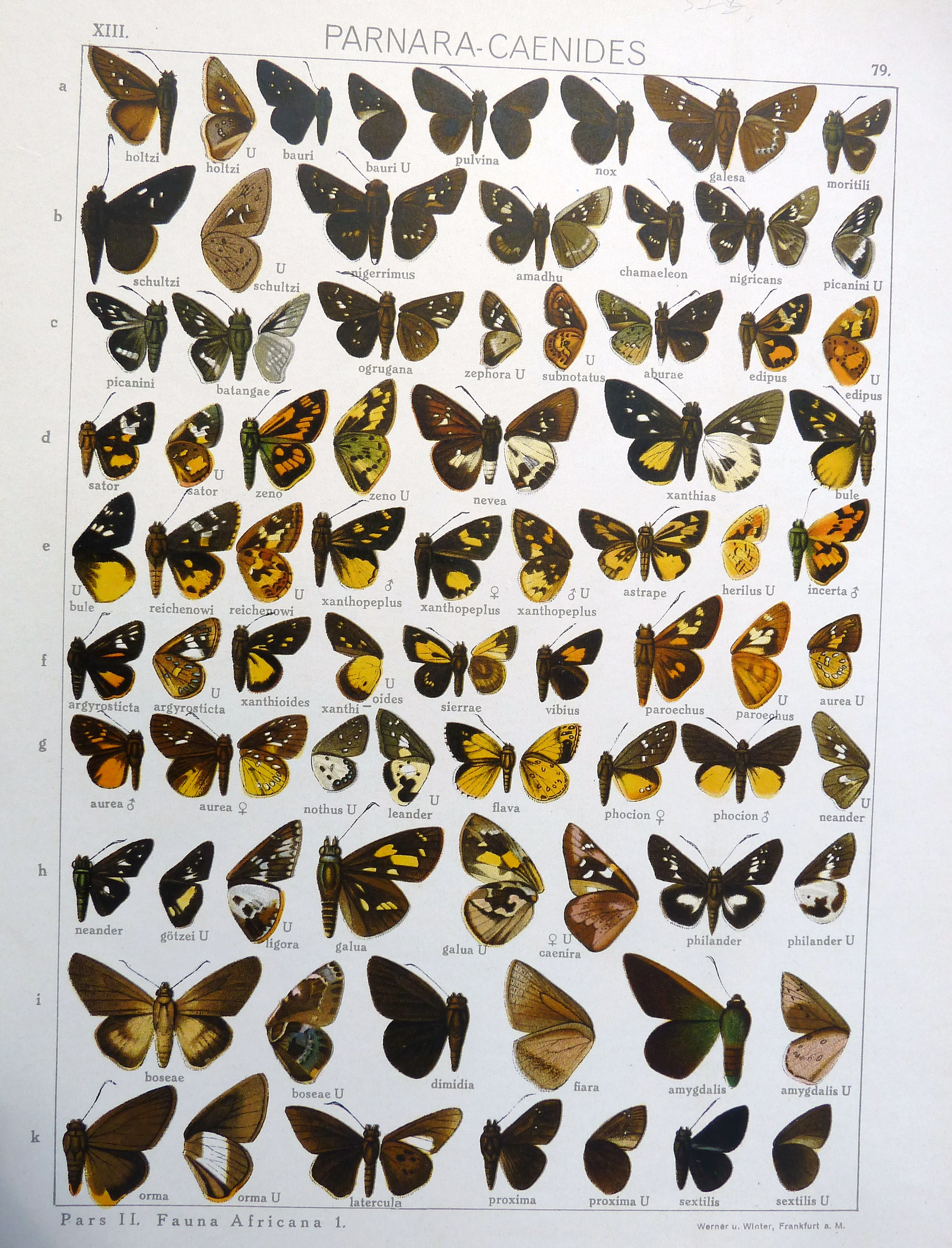

Scientific classification
- Domain: Eukaryota
- Kingdom: Animalia
- Phylum: Arthropoda
- Class: Insecta
- Order: Lepidoptera
- Family: Hesperiidae
- Genus: Xanthodisca
- Species: X. vibius

Binomial name
- Xanthodisca vibius (Hewitson, 1878)

Synonyms
- Astictopterus vibius Hewitson, 1878

= Xanthodisca vibius =

Species of butterfly

Xanthodisca vibius, the Vibius orange and Vibius skipper, is a butterfly in the family Hesperiidae. It is found in Cameroon, Equatorial Guinea, Gabon, the Democratic Republic of the Congo, Uganda, western Kenya, eastern Tanzania, Malawi, north-western and north-eastern Zambia and Zimbabwe. The habitat consists of forests and moist dense woodland, especially Brachystegia woodland.

Adults are known to mud-puddle. They are on wing from January to May.

The larvae feed on Aframomum species.
