= Platylesches shona =

Scientific classification
- Domain: Eukaryota
- Kingdom: Animalia
- Phylum: Arthropoda
- Class: Insecta
- Order: Lepidoptera
- Family: Hesperiidae
- Genus: Platylesches
- Species: P. shona

Binomial name
- Platylesches shona Evans, 1937

Species of butterfly

Platylesches shona, the Shona hopper, is a butterfly in the family Hesperiidae. It is found in the Democratic Republic of the Congo (Shaba), Zambia, Mozambique, Zimbabwe and Namibia.

Adults are on wing from July to October and again from March to May, probably in two generations per year.
