= Djoudj National Bird Sanctuary =

National park in Senegal

- IUCN category II (national park)
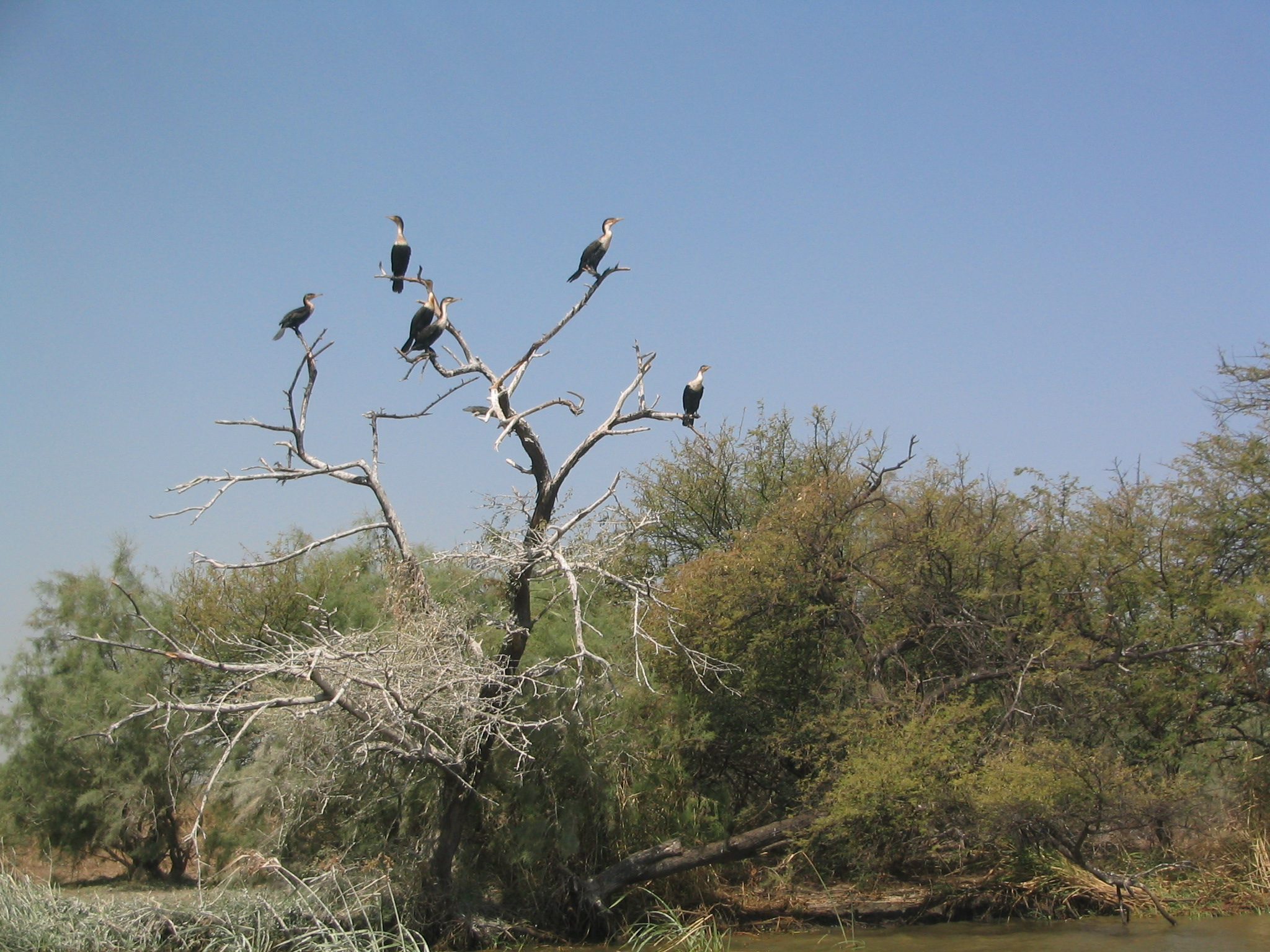

- Location within Senegal Location within Africa
- Location: Senegal
- Coordinates: 16°21′31″N 16°16′27″W
- Area: 160 km^{2} (62 sq mi)
- Established: 14 April 1971

UNESCO World Heritage Site
- Type: Natural
- Criteria: vii, x
- Designated: 1981 (5th session)
- Reference no.: 25
- Region: Africa
- Endangered: 1984–1988; 2000–2006

Ramsar Wetland
- Official name: Parc National des Oiseaux du Djoudj
- Designated: 11 July 1977
- Reference no.: 138

The Djoudj National Bird Sanctuary (French: Parc national des oiseaux du Djoudj, [d͡ʒud͡ʒ]) lies on the southeast bank of the Senegal River in Senegal, in northern Biffeche, north east of St-Louis.

It provides a variety of wetland habitats which prove very popular with migrating birds, many of which have just crossed the Sahara. Of almost 400 species of birds, the most visible are pelicans and flamingos. Less conspicuous are the aquatic warblers migrating there from Europe; for these, the park is the single most important wintering site yet discovered. A wide range of wildlife also inhabits the park, which is designated a World Heritage Site. The site was added to the list of World Heritage in Danger in 1984 due to the introduction of the invasive giant salvinia plant, which threatens to choke out the park's native vegetation. However it was removed from the list in 2006.

== Environmental issues ==
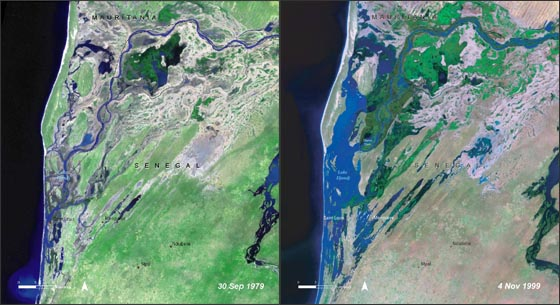
At left, the drought of September 1979; at right, the floods of November 1999

Since operation of the Diama Dam on the Senegal River began in 1988, experts have observed a lowering of the water level, desalinization, and silting. The changes pose a threat to the fauna and flora. There has been in particular a proliferation of typhas and Phragmites. To the left, satellite photos take by NASA in 1979 (before construction of the dam) and 1999 (afterwards) give evidence of the significant impact on the region's ecosystem.

In 2006, though no cases of avian flu had been reported in Senegal, a monitoring program was put into effect.

Covering an area of 16,000 hectares, 395 bird species (nearly three million birds) have been recorded there, making the Djoudj National Bird Park the world's 3rd largest ornithological reserve.

The sanctuary also contains large populations of crocodiles and manatees.

== See also ==
- Diawling National Park
- Wildlife of Senegal
