= Prosopalpus saga =

Scientific classification
- Kingdom: Animalia
- Phylum: Arthropoda
- Clade: Pancrustacea
- Class: Insecta
- Order: Lepidoptera
- Family: Hesperiidae
- Genus: Prosopalpus
- Species: P. saga

Binomial name
- Prosopalpus saga Evans, 1937

Species of butterfly

Prosopalpus saga, the branded dwarf skipper, is a butterfly in the family Hesperiidae. It is found in Guinea, Ivory Coast, Ghana, Cameroon, western Uganda, north-western Tanzania and possibly western Kenya. The habitat consists of forests.

Adults have been recorded feeding on nectar from Lantana flowers.
