= Wildlife of Senegal =

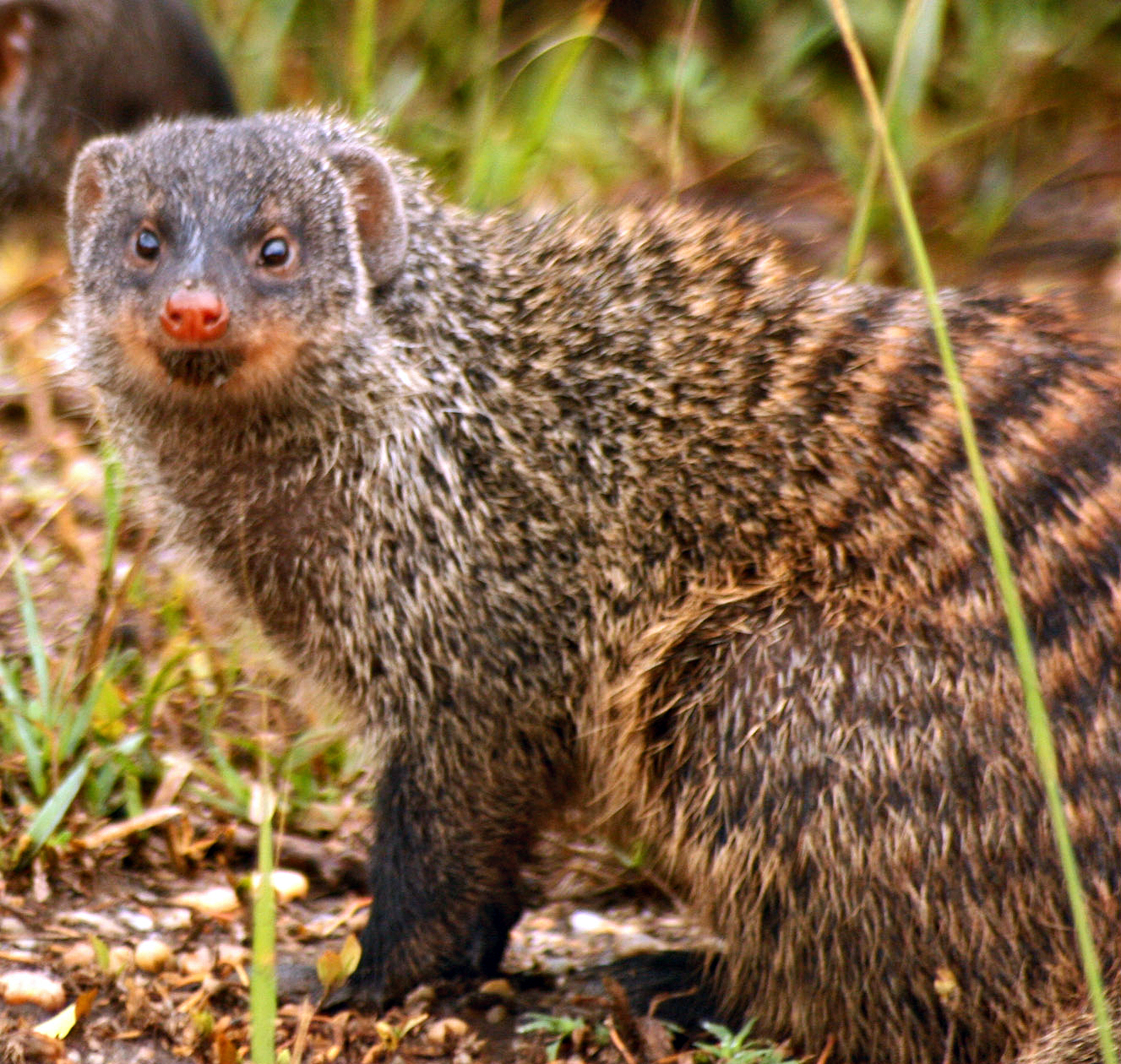
Banded mongoose

The wildlife of Senegal consists of the flora and fauna of this nation in West Africa. Senegal has a long Atlantic coastline and a range of habitat types, with a corresponding diversity of plants and animals. Senegal has 188 species of mammals and 674 species of bird.

== Geography ==
Senegal is bounded by the Atlantic Ocean to the west, Mauritania to the north, Mali to the east, and Guinea and Guinea-Bissau to the south. It has a long internal border with The Gambia which lies on either side of the Gambia River but is otherwise surrounded by Senegal. The four major rivers, the Senegal River, the Saloum River, the Gambia River and the Casamance River, drain westwards into the Atlantic Ocean. The Lac de Guiers is a large freshwater lake in the north of the country while Lake Retba, near Dakar, is saline.

The northern half of the country has an arid or semi-arid climate and is largely desert while south of the Gambia River the rainfall is higher and the terrain consists of savannah grassland and forest. Much of the country is fairly flat and below the 500 m (1,640 ft) contour, but there are some low, rolling hills in the southeast, the foothills of the Fouta Djallon in Guinea. The northern half of the coast is sandy and flat, whereas south of Dakar it is muddy and swampy.

The northern part of the country has a semi-arid climate, with precipitation increasing substantially further south to exceed 1,500 mm (60 in) in some areas. Winds blow from the southwest during the rainy season from May to November, and from the northeast during the rest of the year, resulting in well-defined humid and dry seasons. Dakar's maximum temperatures averages 30 °C (86 °F) in the wet and 26 °C (79 °F) in the dry season.

== Biodiversity ==
With four main ecosystems (forest, savanna grassland, freshwater, marine and coastal), Senegal has a wide diversity of plants and animals. However, increases in human activities and changes in weather patterns which include increased deficits in rainfall, are impacting and degrading the natural habitats. This is particularly noticeable with regard to forests, which in the five years to 2010, were being lost at the rate of 40,000 ha (100,000 acres) per year.

=== Flora ===
About 5,213 species, subspecies and varieties of vascular plants had been recorded in Senegal by the end of 2018, of which 515 were trees or woody plants.

The Niokolo-Koba National Park is a World Heritage Site and large natural protected area in southeastern Senegal near the Guinea-Bissau border. The park is typical of the woodland savannah of the country. About thirty species of tree are found here, mainly from the families Fabaceae, Combretaceae and Anacardiaceae, and about one thousand species of vascular plant. The drier parts are dominated by the African kino tree and Combretum glutinosum, while the gallery forests beside rivers and streams (many of which dry up seasonally) are largely formed from Erythrophleum guineense and Pseudospondias microcarpa, interspersed with palms and bamboo clumps. Depressions in the ground fill with water in the rainy season and support a wide range of aquatic vegetation. In the coastal zone of Niayes, a coastal strip of land between Dakar and Saint Louis where a line of lakes lie behind the coastal sand dunes, the predominant vegetation is the African oil-palm, along with the African mesquite and Cape fig.

=== Mammals ===
Many of the larger animals of Senegal that used to have a widespread distribution have suffered from loss of habitat, persecution by farmers, and hunting for bushmeat, and are now largely restricted to the national park. The Guinea baboon is one of these, as are the Senegal hartebeest, the western hartebeest, the scimitar oryx, the roan antelope and several species of gazelle. Habitat degradation has caused populations of western red colobus, lions, elephants, leopards, and many other species to decrease heavily. The western subspecies of the giant eland is critically endangered, the only remaining known population being in the Niokolo-Koba National Park; the rapid decline in numbers of this antelope has been attributed to poaching.

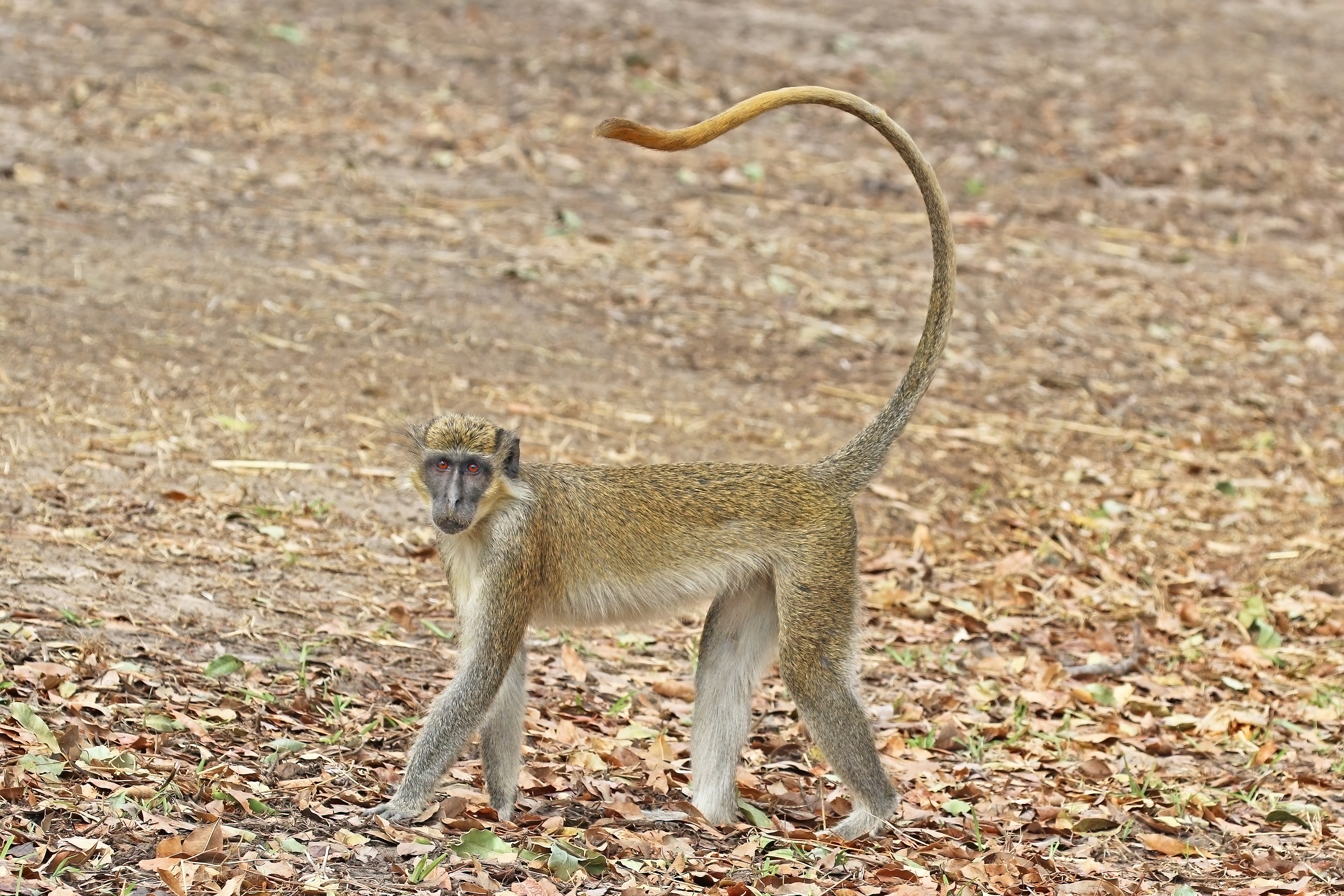
Green monkey male, Senegal

Other mammals found in the country include the green monkey, the Guinean gerbil and the Senegal one-striped grass mouse.

=== Birds ===
Some 674 species of bird had been recorded in Senegal by April 2019. Some of the more spectacular include the red-billed tropicbird, the Arabian bustard, the Egyptian plover, the golden nightjar, the red-throated bee-eater, the chestnut-bellied starling, the cricket warbler, the Kordofan lark and the Sudan golden sparrow.

The Djoudj National Bird Sanctuary on the south side of the Senegal River Delta is an important site for migrating and overwintering waterfowl. About three million migratory birds spend the winter here. Some birds that nest and breed in the delta include the great white pelican, lesser flamingo, the marbled duck, African spoonbill, purple heron, black crowned crane, and others. Further south is the Saloum Delta National Park which lies on the East Atlantic Flyway, along which about 90 million birds migrate annually. Some birds that breed or winter in the park include the royal tern, the greater flamingo, the Eurasian spoonbill, the curlew sandpiper, the ruddy turnstone and the little stint. Another important wetland area is the Niayes, which is an important centre for waterbirds and raptors; large numbers of black kites have been recorded here.

=== Fish ===
Some 244 species of marine fish had been recorded off the coast of Senegal by April 2019. Some freshwater species of fish have been impacted by the creation of dams in the Senegal River Delta and the proliferation of some plants such as the southern cattail.

=== Insects ===
- List of butterflies of Senegal
- List of moths of Senegal
