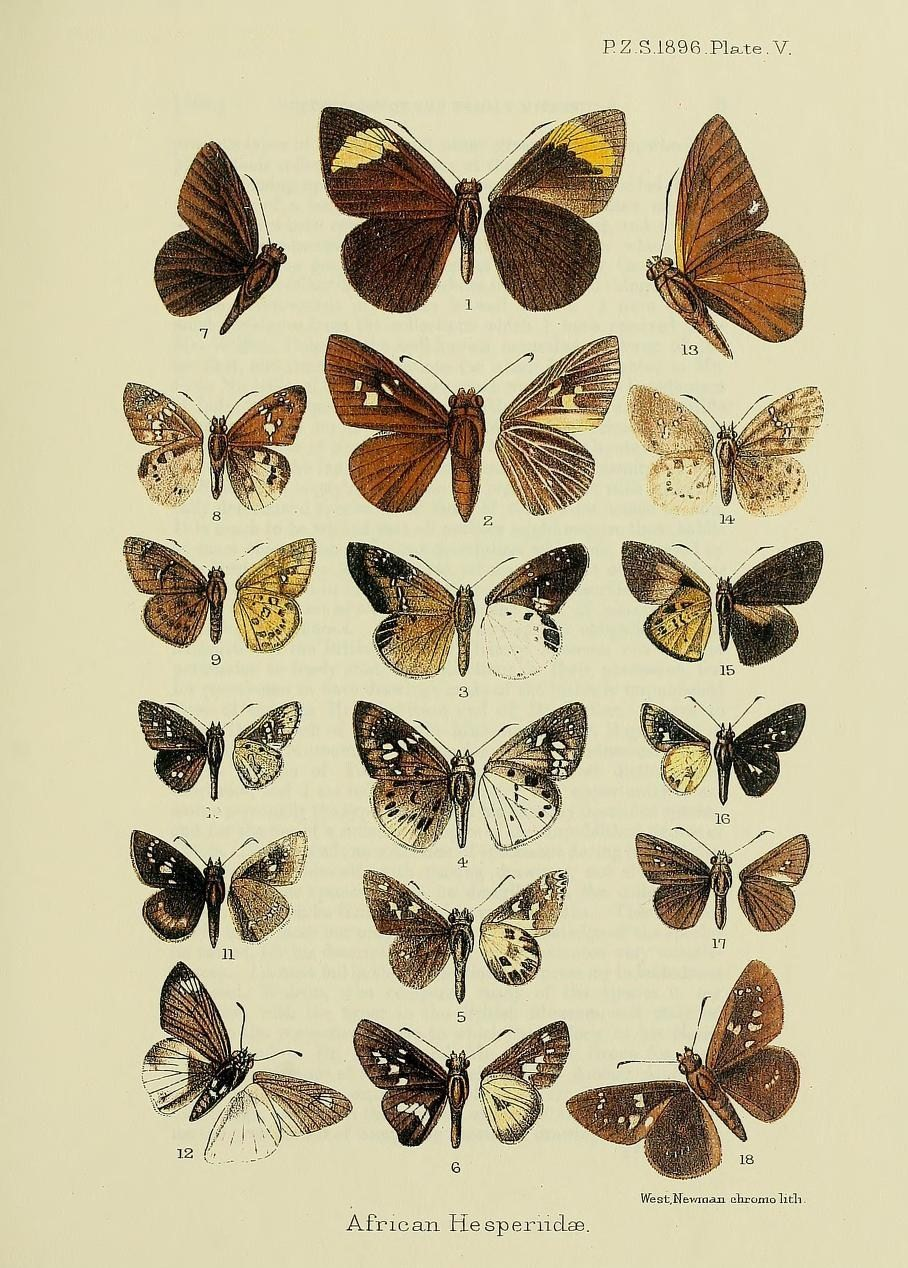
- Platylesches moritili figure 11

Scientific classification
- Kingdom: Animalia
- Phylum: Arthropoda
- Clade: Pancrustacea
- Class: Insecta
- Order: Lepidoptera
- Family: Hesperiidae
- Genus: Platylesches
- Species: P. moritili

Binomial name
- Platylesches moritili (Wallengren, 1857)

Synonyms
- Hesperia moritili Wallengren, 1857; Apaustus zephora Plötz, 1884; Pamphila heterophyla Mabille, 1891; Pamphila amadhu Mabille, 1891; Platylesches moritili f. costalis Aurivillius, 1925

= Platylesches moritili =

Species of butterfly

Platylesches moritili, the honey hopper or common hopper, is a butterfly of the family Hesperiidae. It is found in several countries of Africa, including Burkina Faso. In South Africa, it is found from KwaZulu-Natal, north along the coast and hinterland to Maputaland and from Mpumalanga to northern Gauteng and from the central Limpopo Province to Pafuri. The habitat consists of savanna and riverine forest.

The wingspan is 31–33 mm for males and 33–35 mm for females. Adults are on wing year-round, but are more common from March to May and from October to December.

The larvae feed on the young foliage of Parinari curatellifolia. They are leaf green with a black to brown head.
