= Platylesches iva =

Scientific classification
- Domain: Eukaryota
- Kingdom: Animalia
- Phylum: Arthropoda
- Class: Insecta
- Order: Lepidoptera
- Family: Hesperiidae
- Genus: Platylesches
- Species: P. iva

Binomial name
- Platylesches iva Evans, 1937

Species of butterfly

Platylesches iva, the Evans' hopper, is a butterfly in the family Hesperiidae. It is found in Sierra Leone, Ivory Coast and Nigeria. The habitat probably consists of forests.
