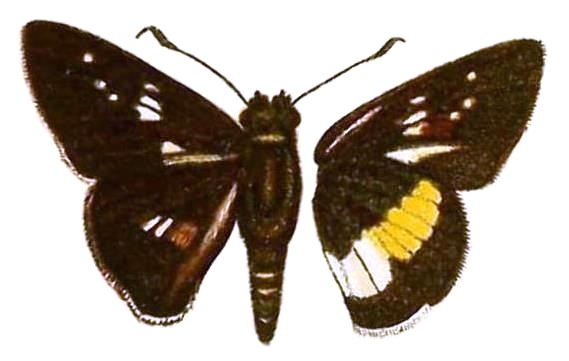

Scientific classification
- Domain: Eukaryota
- Kingdom: Animalia
- Phylum: Arthropoda
- Class: Insecta
- Order: Lepidoptera
- Family: Hesperiidae
- Genus: Platylesches
- Species: P. lamba

Binomial name
- Platylesches lamba Neave, 1910

= Platylesches lamba =

Species of butterfly

Platylesches lamba, the Neave's banded hopper, is a butterfly in the family Hesperiidae. It is found in Ivory Coast, Ghana, Cameroon, the Democratic Republic of the Congo (Shaba), western Uganda, Malawi and northern Zambia. The habitat consists of woodland and open places in the forest zone.
