= Platylesches larseni =

Scientific classification
- Kingdom: Animalia
- Phylum: Arthropoda
- Class: Insecta
- Order: Lepidoptera
- Family: Hesperiidae
- Genus: Platylesches
- Species: P. larseni

Binomial name
- Platylesches larseni Kielland, 1992

Species of butterfly

Platylesches larseni is a butterfly in the family Hesperiidae. It is found in Tanzania (the Mpanda District). The habitat consists of riverine forests at altitudes ranging from 1,500 to 1,600 meters.

Adults males mud-puddle and feed from bird droppings. Adults are on wing from July to August.
