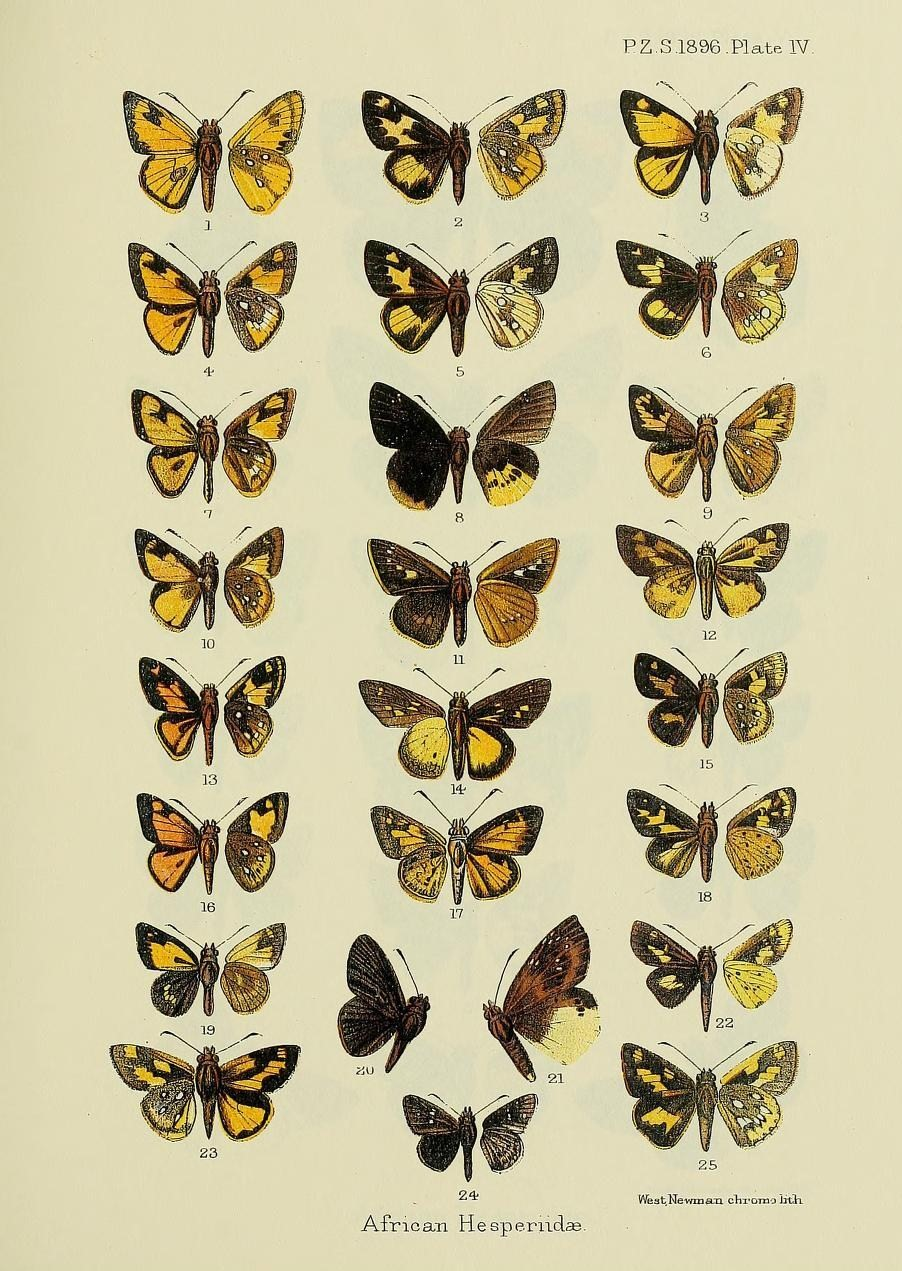
- Xanthodisca

Scientific classification
- Kingdom: Animalia
- Phylum: Arthropoda
- Class: Insecta
- Order: Lepidoptera
- Family: Hesperiidae
- Tribe: Erionotini
- Genus: Xanthodisca; Aurivillius, [1925]

= Xanthodisca =

Genus of butterflies

Xanthodisca is a genus of skippers in the family Hesperiidae.

== Species ==
- Xanthodisca ariel (Mabille, 1878)
- Xanthodisca rega (Mabille, 1890)
- Xanthodisca vibius (Hewitson, 1878)

=== Former species ===
- Xanthodisca astrape ((Holland, 1892) - transferred to Xanthonymus astrape ((Holland, 1892)
