= Prosopalpus =

Scientific classification
- Kingdom: Animalia
- Phylum: Arthropoda
- Class: Insecta
- Order: Lepidoptera
- Family: Hesperiidae
- Tribe: Aeromachini
- Genus: Prosopalpus; Holland, 1896

Genus of butterflies

Prosopalpus is a genus of skippers in the family Hesperiidae.

== Species ==
- Prosopalpus debilis (Plötz, 1879)
- Prosopalpus saga Evans, 1937
- Prosopalpus styla Evans, 1937
