= Xanthodisca ariel =

Scientific classification
- Kingdom: Animalia
- Phylum: Arthropoda
- Clade: Pancrustacea
- Class: Insecta
- Order: Lepidoptera
- Family: Hesperiidae
- Genus: Xanthodisca
- Species: X. ariel

Binomial name
- Xanthodisca ariel (Mabille, 1878)

Synonyms
- Pamphila ariel Mabille, 1878

Species of butterfly

Xanthodisca ariel is a butterfly in the family Hesperiidae.

== Ecosystem ==
It is found on Madagascar. The habitat consists of forests.
