= Platylesches rasta =

Scientific classification
- Domain: Eukaryota
- Kingdom: Animalia
- Phylum: Arthropoda
- Class: Insecta
- Order: Lepidoptera
- Family: Hesperiidae
- Genus: Platylesches
- Species: P. rasta

Binomial name
- Platylesches rasta Evans, 1937

Species of butterfly

Platylesches rasta is a butterfly in the family Hesperiidae. It is found in Uganda, Tanzania and Malawi.

== Subspecies ==
- Platylesches rasta rasta (north-eastern Tanzania, Malawi)
- Platylesches rasta anka Evans, 1937 (Uganda)
