= Platylesches langa =

Scientific classification
- Kingdom: Animalia
- Phylum: Arthropoda
- Clade: Pancrustacea
- Class: Insecta
- Order: Lepidoptera
- Family: Hesperiidae
- Genus: Platylesches
- Species: P. langa

Binomial name
- Platylesches langa Evans, 1937

Synonyms
- Platylesches ayresii langa Evans, 1937

Species of butterfly

Platylesches langa, the dark peppered hopper or irrorated hopper, is a butterfly in the family Hesperiidae. It is found in northern Nigeria, the Democratic Republic of the Congo (Shaba), southern Tanzania, Malawi, eastern Zambia and Zimbabwe. The habitat consists of woodland.

Adults are on wing year round.
