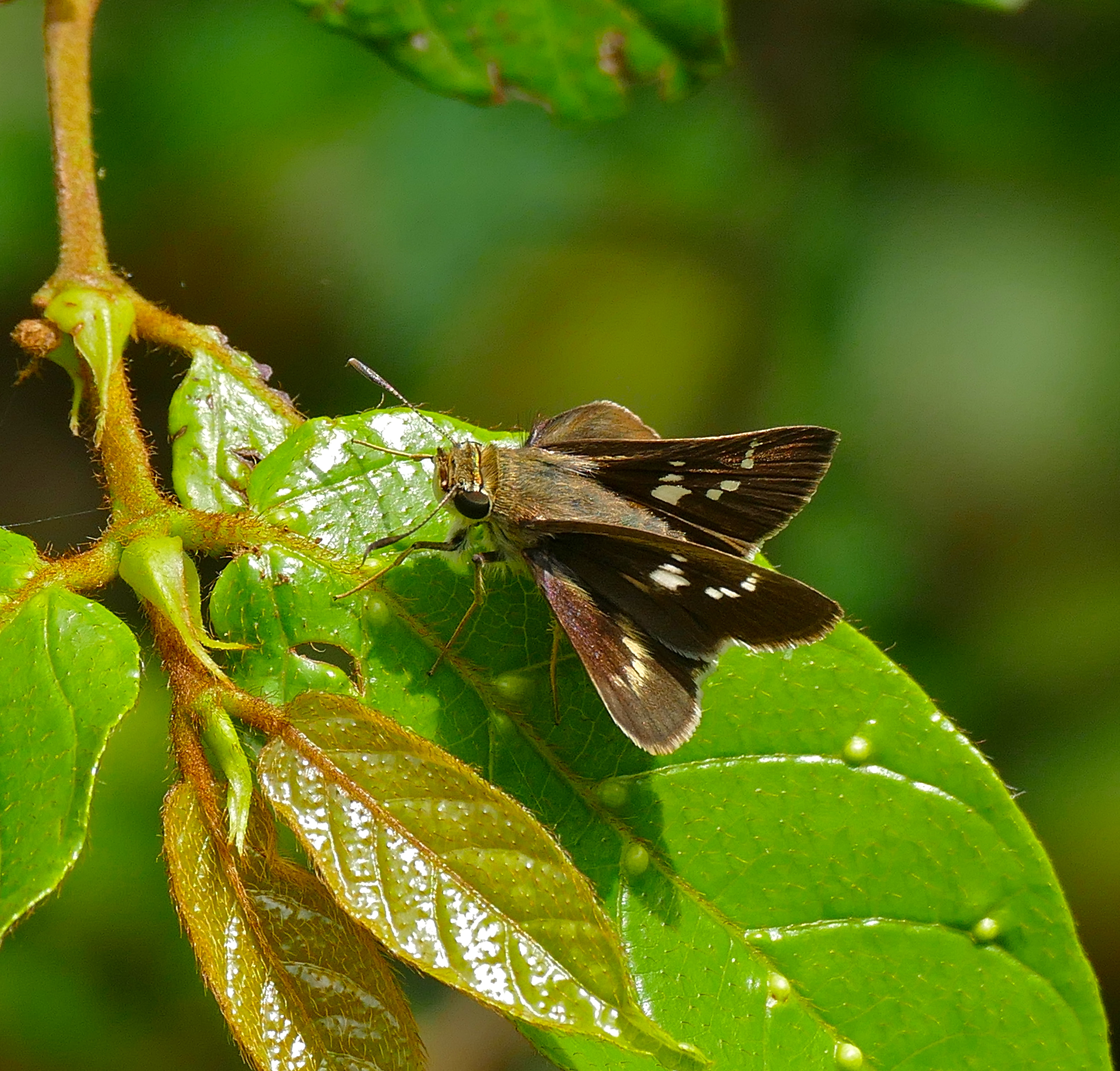
- Platylesches neba

Scientific classification
- Kingdom: Animalia
- Phylum: Arthropoda
- Clade: Pancrustacea
- Class: Insecta
- Order: Lepidoptera
- Family: Hesperiidae
- Tribe: Megathymini
- Genus: Platylesches; Holland, 1896

= Platylesches =

Genus of butterflies

Platylesches is a genus of skipper butterflies in the family Hesperiidae, commonly called hoppers, found in Africa.

== Species ==
Listed alphabetically:

- Platylesches affinissima Strand, 1920
- Platylesches ayresii (Trimen, 1889) – peppered hopper
- Platylesches batangae (Holland, 1894)
- Platylesches chamaeleon (Mabille, 1891)
- Platylesches dolomitica Henning & Henning, 1997 – hilltop hopper, dolomite hopper
- Platylesches fosta Evans, 1937
- Platylesches galesa (Hewitson, 1877) – white-tail hopper, black hopper
- Platylesches hassani Collins & Larsen, 2008
- Platylesches heathi Collins & Larsen, 2008
- Platylesches iva Evans, 1937
- Platylesches lamba Neave, 1910
- Platylesches langa Evans, 1937
- Platylesches larseni Kielland, 1992
- Platylesches moritili (Wallengren, 1857) – common hopper, honey hopper
- Platylesches morigambia (Larsen, 2013)
- Platylesches neba (Hewitson, 1877) – flower-girl hopper
- Platylesches panga Evans, 1937
- Platylesches picanini (Holland, 1894) – banded hopper
- Platylesches rasta Evans, 1937
- Platylesches robustus Neave, 1910 – robust hopper
- Platylesches rossii Belcastro, 1986
- Platylesches shona Evans, 1937
- Platylesches tina Evans, 1937 – small hopper

The male of the new species P. morigambia is illustrated in A Sharp Eye on Butterflies of Ghana.
