= Platylesches hassani =

Scientific classification
- Domain: Eukaryota
- Kingdom: Animalia
- Phylum: Arthropoda
- Class: Insecta
- Order: Lepidoptera
- Family: Hesperiidae
- Genus: Platylesches
- Species: P. hassani

Binomial name
- Platylesches hassani Collins & Larsen, 2008

Species of butterfly

Platylesches hassani is a butterfly in the family Hesperiidae. It is found in the Democratic Republic of the Congo and Zambia.
