= Platylesches heathi =

Scientific classification
- Domain: Eukaryota
- Kingdom: Animalia
- Phylum: Arthropoda
- Class: Insecta
- Order: Lepidoptera
- Family: Hesperiidae
- Genus: Platylesches
- Species: P. heathi

Binomial name
- Platylesches heathi Collins & Larsen, 2008

Species of butterfly

Platylesches heathi is a butterfly in the family Hesperiidae. It is found in Zambia.
