= Platylesches panga =

Scientific classification
- Domain: Eukaryota
- Kingdom: Animalia
- Phylum: Arthropoda
- Class: Insecta
- Order: Lepidoptera
- Family: Hesperiidae
- Genus: Platylesches
- Species: P. panga

Binomial name
- Platylesches panga Evans, 1937

Species of butterfly

Platylesches panga is a butterfly in the family Hesperiidae. It is found in western Uganda, the Democratic Republic of the Congo (Shaba) and western Tanzania.
