= Platylesches fosta =

Scientific classification
- Domain: Eukaryota
- Kingdom: Animalia
- Phylum: Arthropoda
- Class: Insecta
- Order: Lepidoptera
- Family: Hesperiidae
- Genus: Platylesches
- Species: P. fosta

Binomial name
- Platylesches fosta Evans, 1937

Species of butterfly

Platylesches fosta is a butterfly in the family Hesperiidae. It is found in western Uganda and Tanzania (along the eastern shores of Lake Tanganyika).
