= Platylesches affinissima =

Scientific classification
- Domain: Eukaryota
- Kingdom: Animalia
- Phylum: Arthropoda
- Class: Insecta
- Order: Lepidoptera
- Family: Hesperiidae
- Genus: Platylesches
- Species: P. affinissima

Binomial name
- Platylesches affinissima Strand, 1921

Species of butterfly

Platylesches affinissima, the bashful hopper or affinity hopper, is a butterfly in the family Hesperiidae. It is found in Senegal, the Gambia, Guinea, Sierra Leone, Ghana, Nigeria, the Republic of the Congo, Tanzania, Malawi, north-western Zambia, Mozambique and eastern Zimbabwe. The habitat consists of Guinea savanna.

Adults feed from the flowers of trees and shrubs. They are on wing year round, but are most common from May to August.
