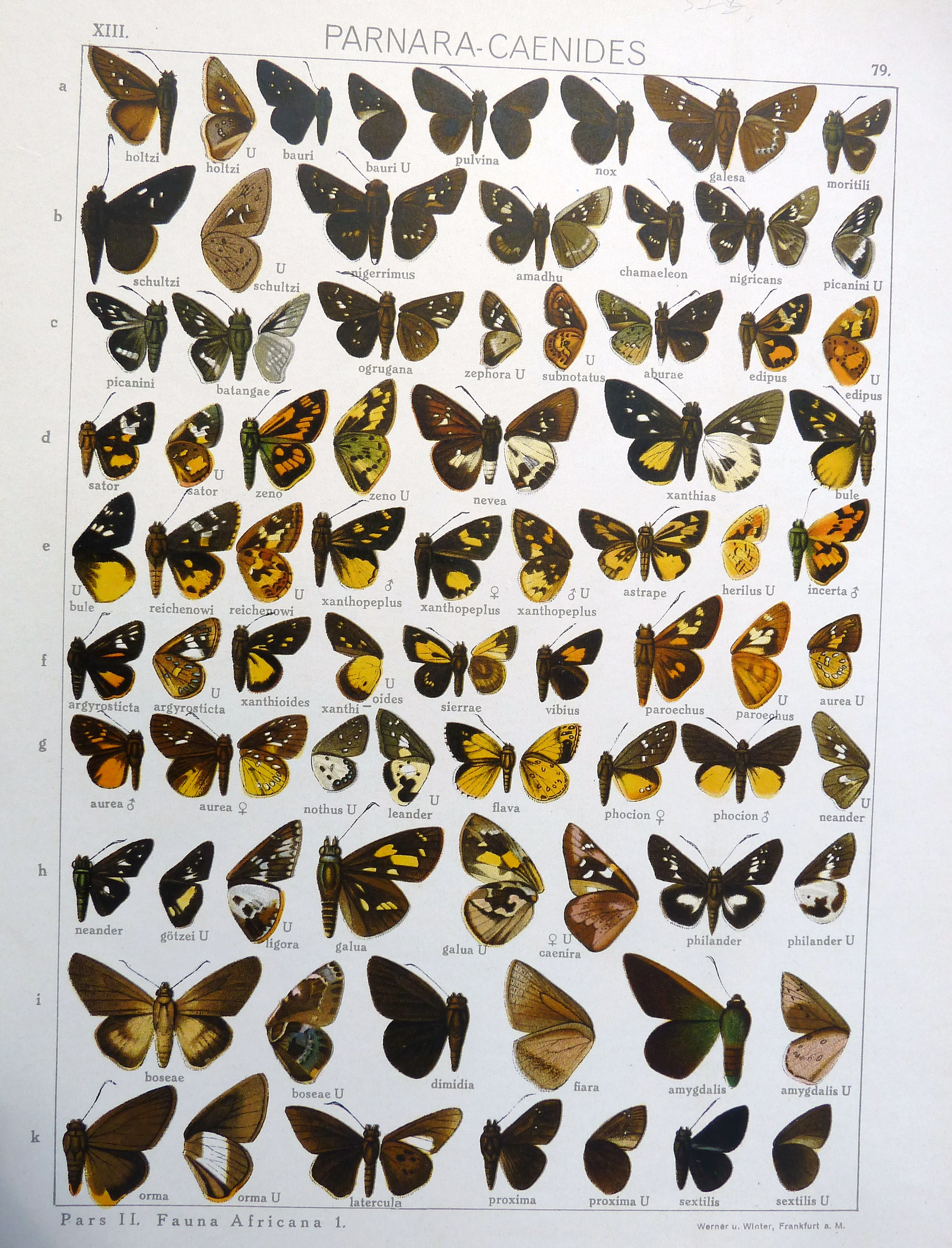

Scientific classification
- Domain: Eukaryota
- Kingdom: Animalia
- Phylum: Arthropoda
- Class: Insecta
- Order: Lepidoptera
- Family: Hesperiidae
- Genus: Platylesches
- Species: P. chamaeleon

Binomial name
- Platylesches chamaeleon (Mabille, 1891)

Synonyms
- Pamphila chamaeleon Mabille, 1891

= Platylesches chamaeleon =

Species of butterfly

Platylesches chamaeleon, the chamaeleon hopper, is a butterfly in the family Hesperiidae. It is found in Senegal, Guinea, Sierra Leone, Liberia, Ivory Coast, Ghana, Nigeria, the Central African Republic, Uganda, Tanzania, Zambia and possibly Niger. The habitat probably consists of forests and gallery forests.

== Subspecies ==
- Platylesches chamaeleon chamaeleon (Senegal, Guinea, Sierra Leone, Liberia, Ivory Coast, Ghana, Nigeria, Central African Republic, Zambia, possibly Niger)
- Platylesches chamaeleon tero Evans, 1937 (western Uganda, north-western Tanzania)
