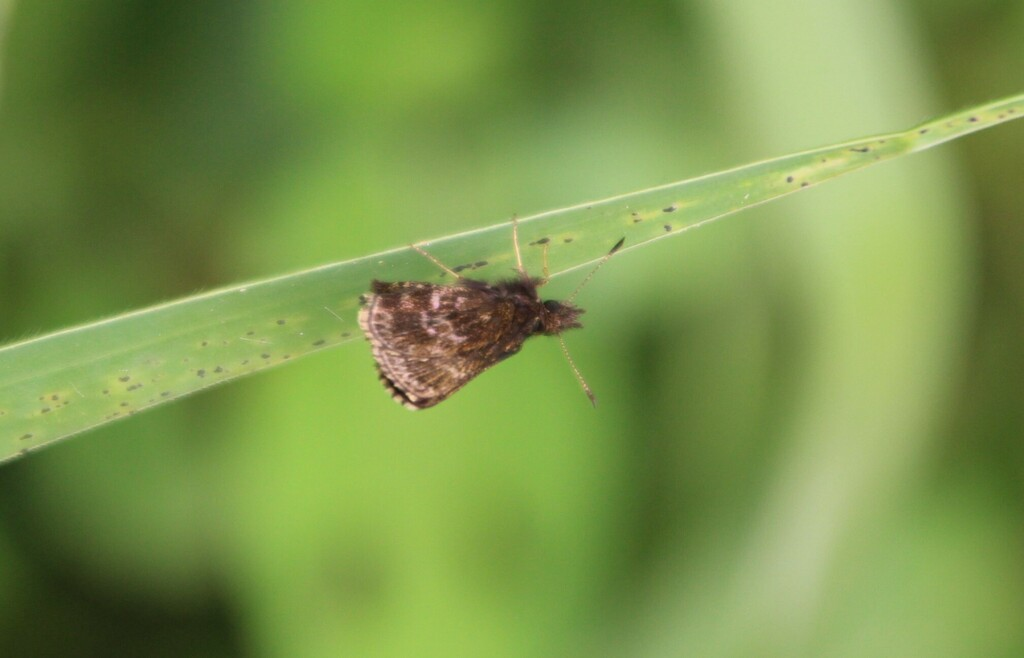

Scientific classification
- Kingdom: Animalia
- Phylum: Arthropoda
- Clade: Pancrustacea
- Class: Insecta
- Order: Lepidoptera
- Family: Hesperiidae
- Genus: Prosopalpus
- Species: P. styla

Binomial name
- Prosopalpus styla Evans, 1937

= Prosopalpus styla =

Species of butterfly

Prosopalpus styla, the widespread dwarf skipper, is a butterfly in the family Hesperiidae. It is found in Senegal, the Gambia, Guinea, Burkina Faso, Sierra Leone, Ivory Coast, Ghana, Nigeria, Cameroon, southern Sudan, Uganda, western Kenya, Tanzania and north-western Zambia. The habitat consists of marshy open areas in savanna and forests.

Adults males are known to mud-puddle.

The larvae feed on Poaceae species.

Torben Larsen developed a species numbering system for his 2005 publication Butterflies of West Africa. This species is #1279. The 'Larsen' numbers have since been used with permission in A Sharp Eye on Butterflies of Ghana.
