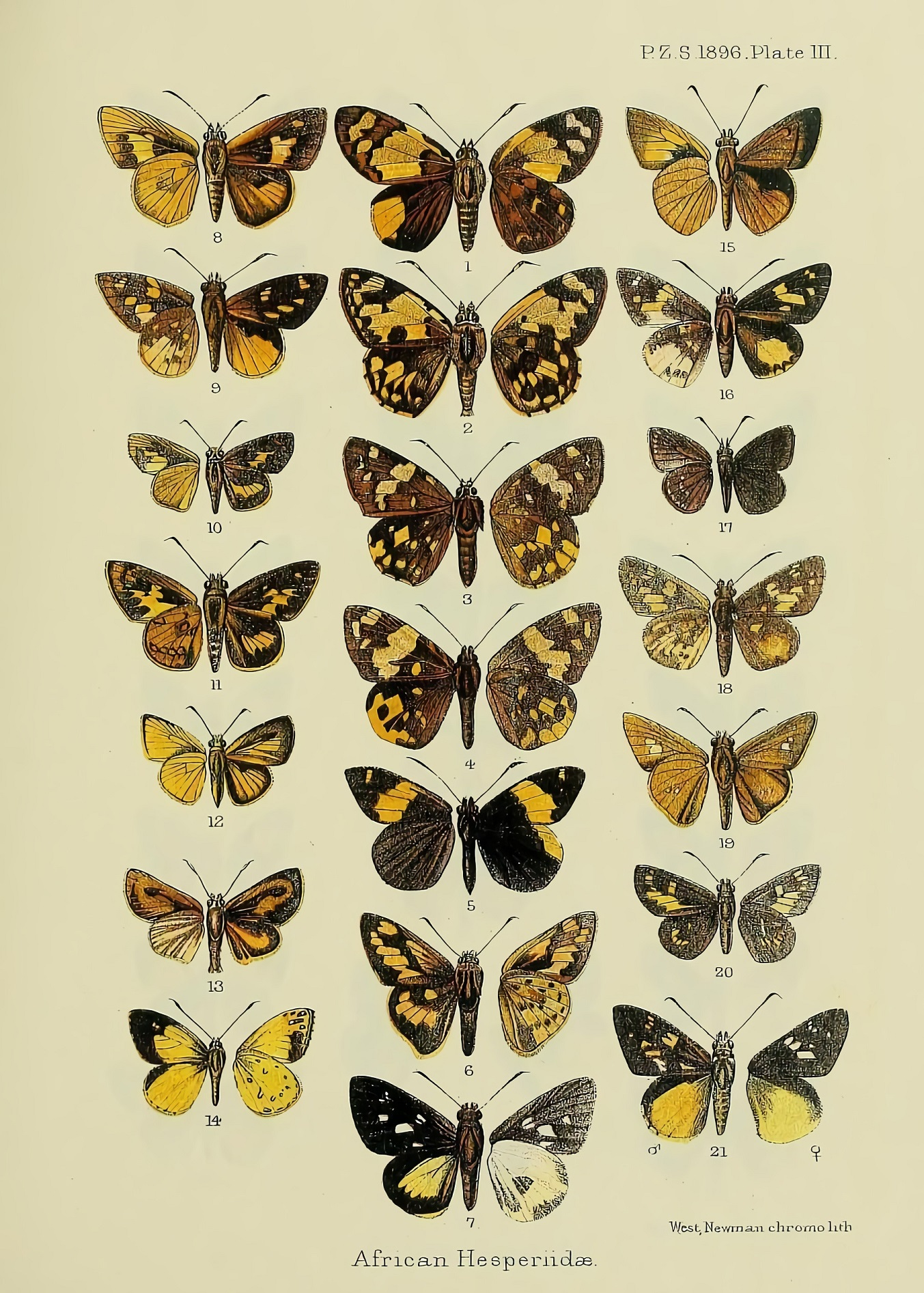
- Xanthodisca rega figure 20

Scientific classification
- Kingdom: Animalia
- Phylum: Arthropoda
- Clade: Pancrustacea
- Class: Insecta
- Order: Lepidoptera
- Family: Hesperiidae
- Genus: Xanthodisca
- Species: X. rega

Binomial name
- Xanthodisca rega (Mabille, 1890)

Synonyms
- Pamphila rega Mabille, 1890; Osmodes staudingeri Holland, 1896; Pardaleodes sierrae Holland, 1896; Xanthodisca vibius rega f. evansi Picard, 1949

= Xanthodisca rega =

Species of butterfly

Xanthodisca rega, the yellow-disk skipper, is a butterfly in the family Hesperiidae. It is found in Senegal, Guinea-Bissau, Guinea, Sierra Leone, Liberia, Ivory Coast, Ghana, Nigeria, Cameroon and Gabon.

Torben Larsen developed a species numbering system for his 2005 publication Butterflies of West Africa. This species is #1317. The 'Larsen' numbers have since been used with permission in A Sharp Eye on Butterflies of Ghana.
