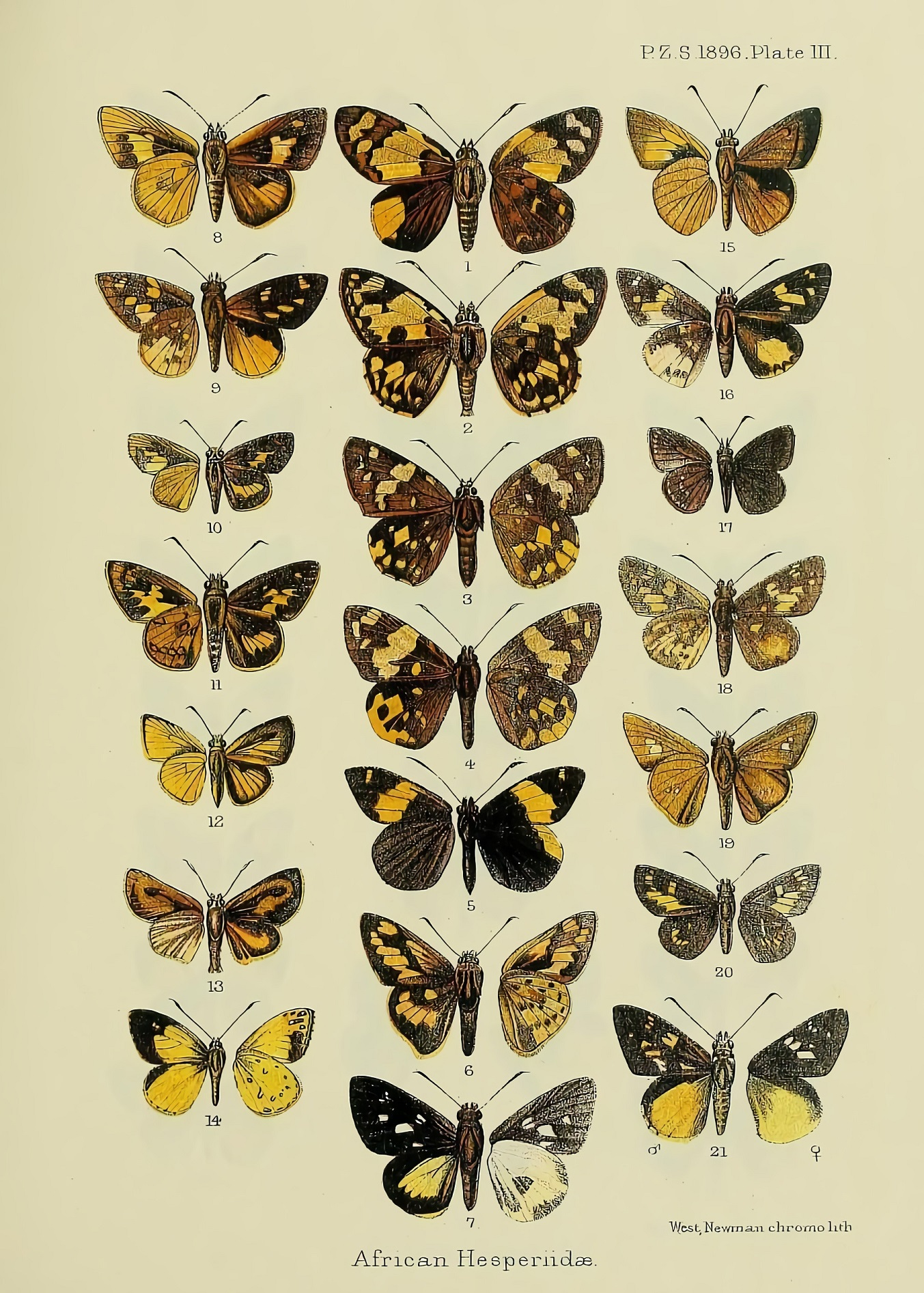
- Prosopalpus debilis figure 17

Scientific classification
- Kingdom: Animalia
- Phylum: Arthropoda
- Clade: Pancrustacea
- Class: Insecta
- Order: Lepidoptera
- Family: Hesperiidae
- Genus: Prosopalpus
- Species: P. debilis

Binomial name
- Prosopalpus debilis (Plötz, 1879)

Synonyms
- Apaustus debilis Plötz, 1879; Cobalus duplex Mabille, 1890

= Prosopalpus debilis =

Species of butterfly

Prosopalpus debilis, the western dwarf skipper, is a butterfly in the family Hesperiidae. It is found in Senegal, Guinea, Sierra Leone, Liberia, Ivory Coast, Ghana, western Nigeria, Cameroon, Gabon, Ethiopia, north-western Tanzania and northern Zambia. The habitat consists of forests.

Torben Larsen developed a species numbering system for his 2005 publication Butterflies of West Africa. This species is #1278. The 'Larsen' numbers have since been used with permission in A Sharp Eye on Butterflies of Ghana.
