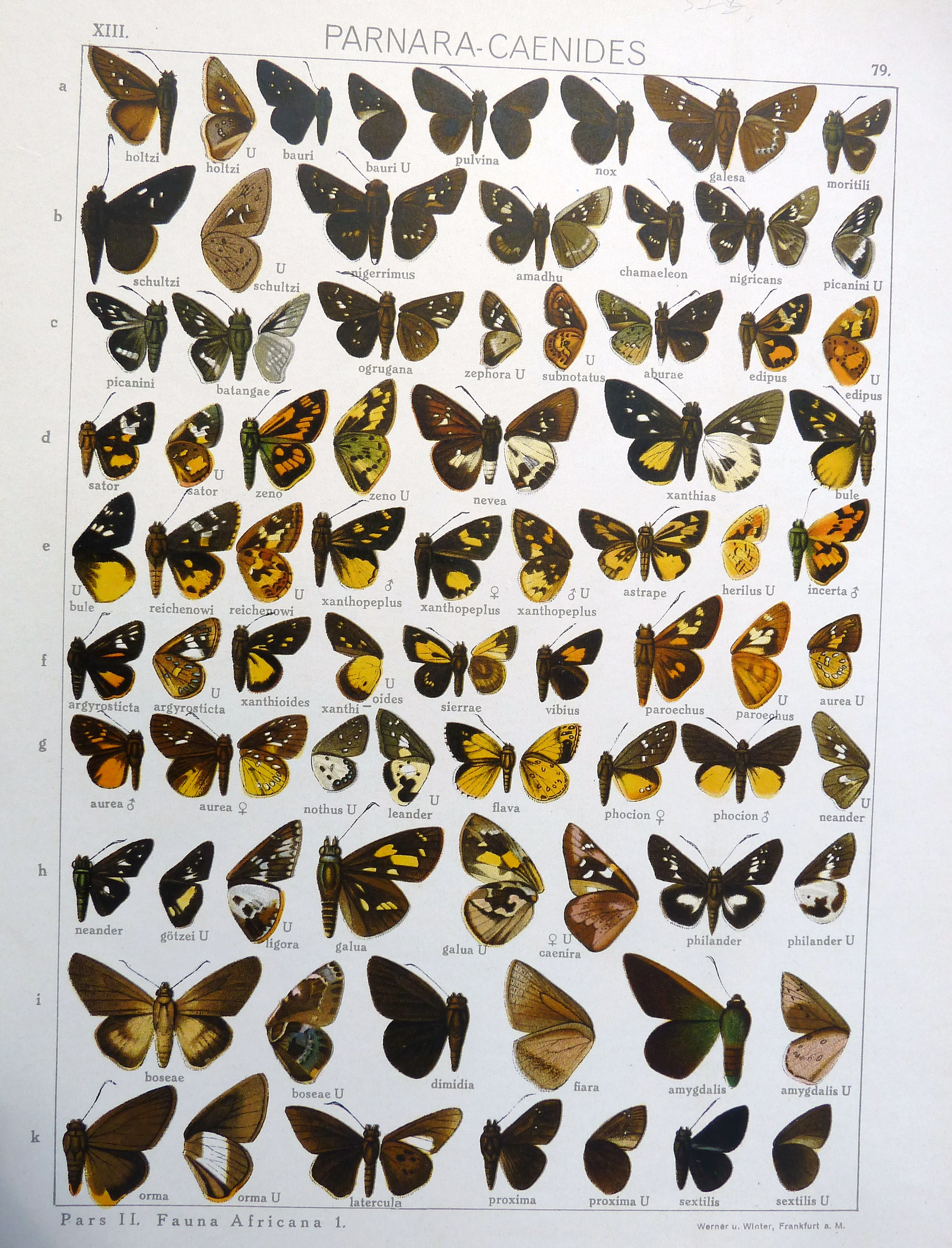

Scientific classification
- Domain: Eukaryota
- Kingdom: Animalia
- Phylum: Arthropoda
- Class: Insecta
- Order: Lepidoptera
- Family: Hesperiidae
- Genus: Platylesches
- Species: P. batangae

Binomial name
- Platylesches batangae (Holland, 1894)

Synonyms
- Parnara batangae Holland, 1894

= Platylesches batangae =

Species of butterfly

Platylesches batangae, the Batanga hopper, is a butterfly in the family Hesperiidae. It is found in Senegal, the Gambia, Guinea, Sierra Leone, Ivory Coast, Cameroon, Angola, the central part of the Democratic Republic of the Congo, Zambia and possibly Nigeria.

The larvae feed on Parinari congensis and Parinari polyandra.
