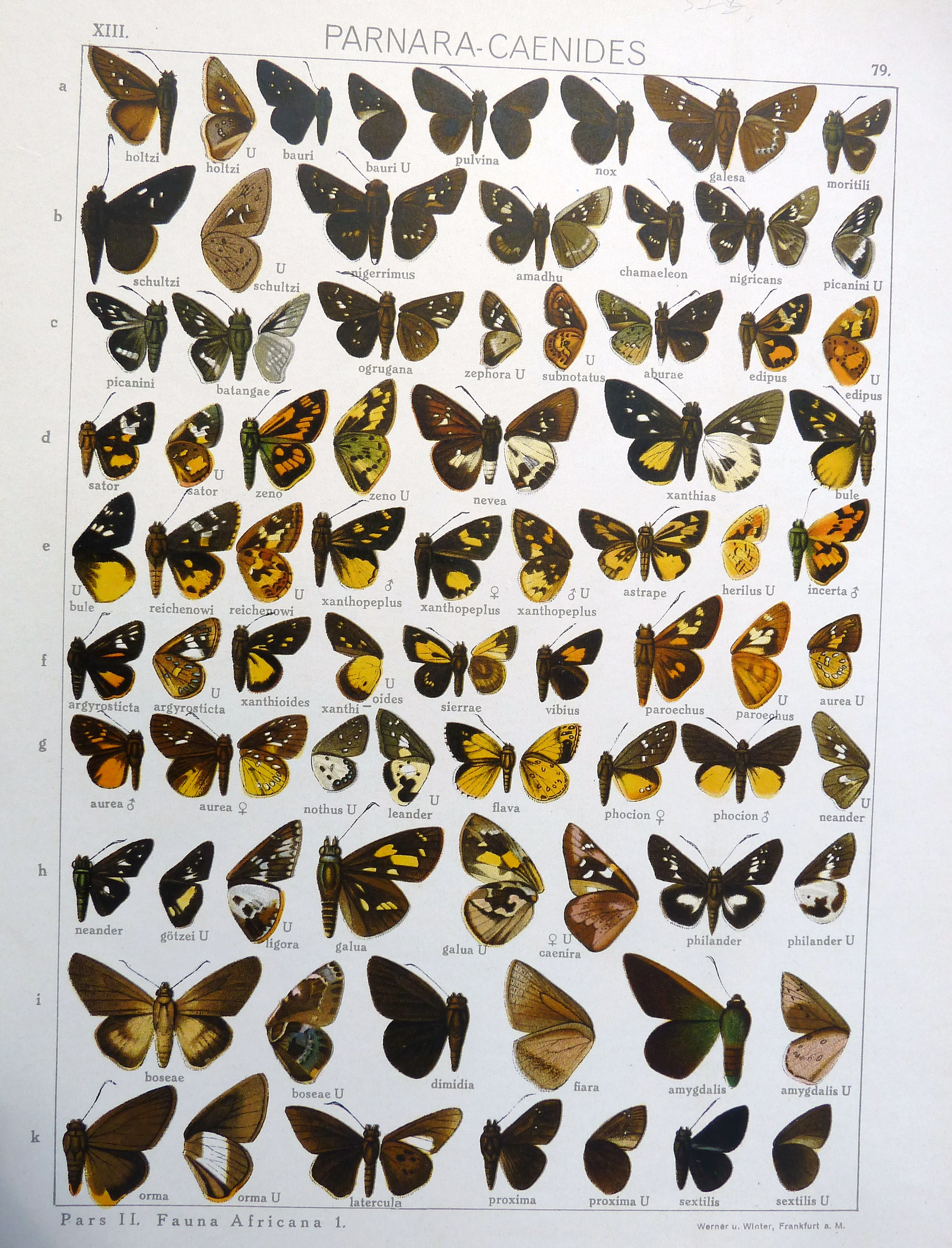
- b, c

Scientific classification
- Kingdom: Animalia
- Phylum: Arthropoda
- Clade: Pancrustacea
- Class: Insecta
- Order: Lepidoptera
- Family: Hesperiidae
- Genus: Platylesches
- Species: P. picanini

Binomial name
- Platylesches picanini (Holland, 1894)

Synonyms
- Parnara picanini Holland, 1894; Pamphila grandiplaga Mabille, 1891; Platylesches goetzei Grünberg, 1907; Pamphila junodi Oberthür, 1909

= Platylesches picanini =

Banded hopper

Species of butterfly

Platylesches picanini, the banded hopper, is a butterfly of the family Hesperiidae. It is found in Senegal, Gambia, Guinea, Sierra Leone, Liberia, Ivory Coast, Ghana, Nigeria, Cameroon, the Democratic Republic of the Congo, Uganda, south-western Kenya, Tanzania, Malawi, northern Zambia, Mozambique, Zimbabwe and South Africa (the Limpopo Province and Mpumalanga). The habitat consists of forests, riparian vegetation along river courses, woodland, dry forests and Guinea savanna.

The wingspan is 30–40 mm. These skippers have brown on the uppersides with small white spots on the forewings and small yellow median dashes on the hindwings. The underside wings are black with broad white or yellow median bands, as suggested by the common name. Flight period is from January to May and June to August, with two broods. Adults have been recorded feeding from flowers, including those of Eupatorium species and teak.

Torben Larsen developed a species numbering system for his 2005 publication Butterflies of West Africa. This species is #1437. The 'Larsen' numbers have since been used with permission in A Sharp Eye on Butterflies of Ghana.
