= Platylesches rossii =

Scientific classification
- Kingdom: Animalia
- Phylum: Arthropoda
- Clade: Pancrustacea
- Class: Insecta
- Order: Lepidoptera
- Family: Hesperiidae
- Genus: Platylesches
- Species: P. rossii

Binomial name
- Platylesches rossii Belcastro, 1986

Species of butterfly

Platylesches rossii, the Loma hopper, is a butterfly in the family Hesperiidae. It is found in Senegal, Guinea, Sierra Leone, Ivory Coast and Ghana. The habitat probably consists of the forest/savanna transition zone.

Adult males mud-puddle.

Torben Larsen developed a species numbering system for his 2005 publication Butterflies of West Africa. This species is #1435. The 'Larsen' numbers have since been used with permission in A Sharp Eye on Butterflies of Ghana.
