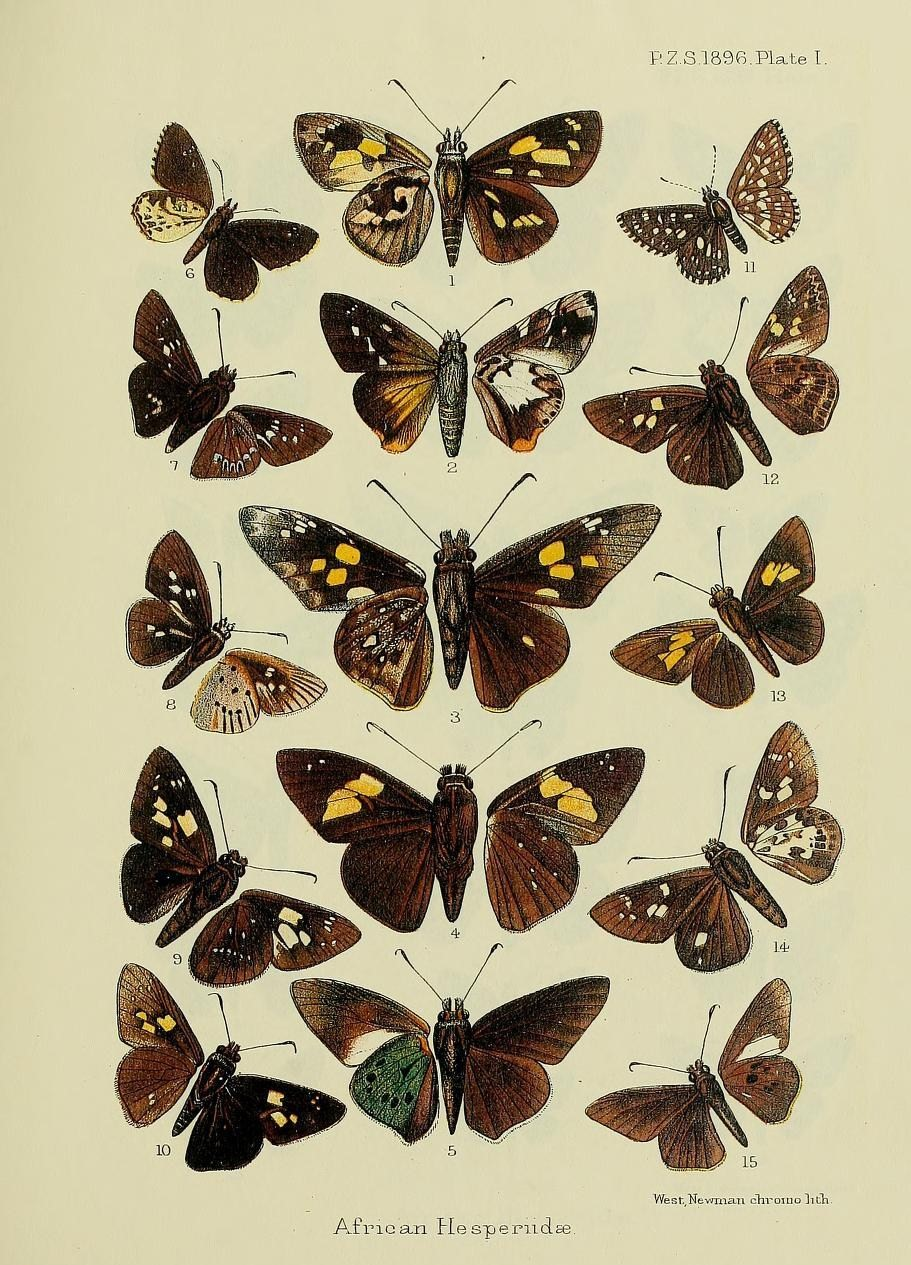
- Platylesches galesa figure 7

Scientific classification
- Kingdom: Animalia
- Phylum: Arthropoda
- Clade: Pancrustacea
- Class: Insecta
- Order: Lepidoptera
- Family: Hesperiidae
- Genus: Platylesches
- Species: P. galesa

Binomial name
- Platylesches galesa (Hewitson, 1877)

Synonyms
- Hesperia galesa Hewitson, 1877; Pamphila galesa; Halpe nigerrima Butler, 1894; Platylesches nigricans Holland, 1896; Platylesches depygata Strand, 1921

= Platylesches galesa =

Species of butterfly

Platylesches galesa, the white-tail hopper or black hopper, is a butterfly of the family Hesperiidae. It is found in West Africa, Transvaal, Mozambique and Zimbabwe. It is common in forest and woodland.

The wingspan is 33–37 mm for males and 36–40 mm for females.

Torben Larsen developed a species numbering system for his 2005 publication Butterflies of West Africa. This species is #1432. The 'Larsen' numbers have since been used with permission in A Sharp Eye on Butterflies of Ghana.
