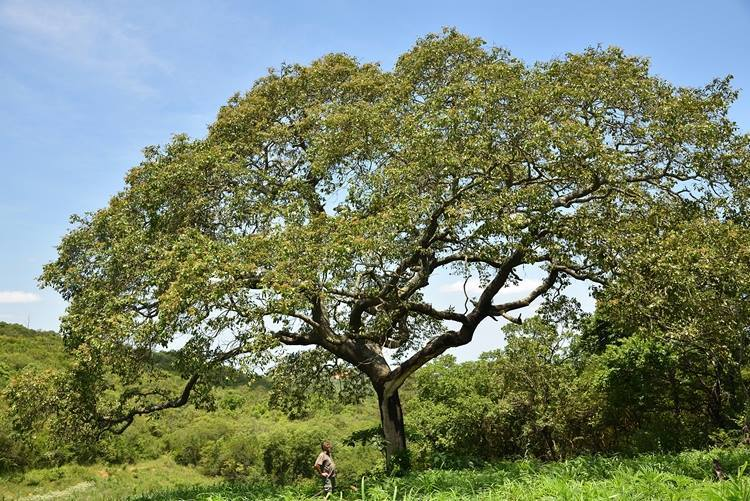

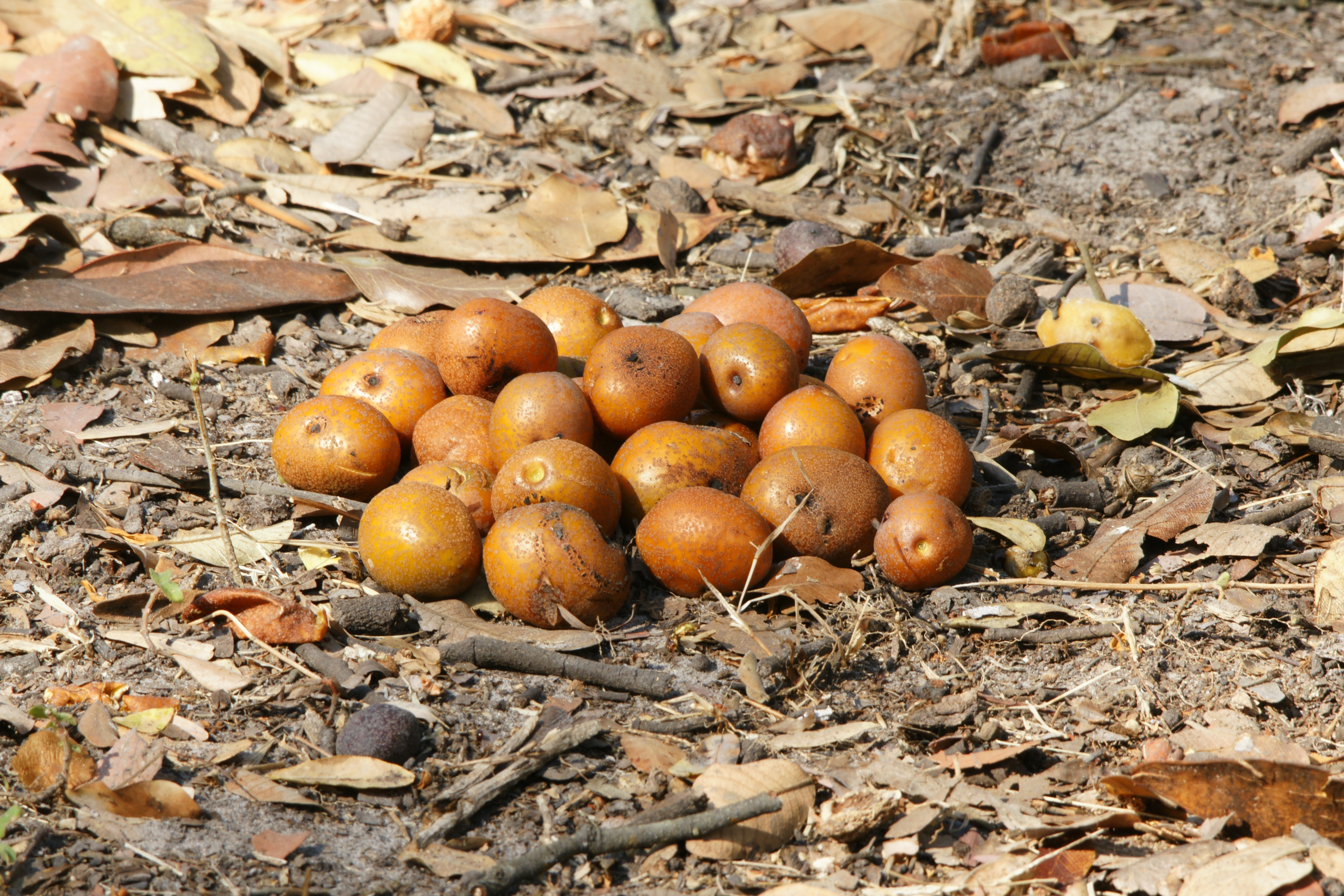

Conservation status
- Least Concern (IUCN 3.1)

Scientific classification
- Kingdom: Plantae
- Clade: Tracheophytes
- Clade: Angiosperms
- Clade: Eudicots
- Clade: Rosids
- Order: Malpighiales
- Family: Chrysobalanaceae
- Genus: Parinari
- Species: P. curatellifolia

Binomial name
- Parinari curatellifolia Planch. ex Benth.

Synonyms
- Ferolia curatellifolia (Planch. ex Benth.) Kuntze; Ferolia mobola (Oliv.) Kuntze; Irvingia mossambicensis Sim; Parinari chapelieri Baill.; Parinari curatellifolia subsp. mobola (Oliv.) R.A.Graham; Parinari gardineri Hemsl.; Parinari mobola Oliv.

= Parinari curatellifolia =

Mobola plum

Species of tree

Parinari curatellifolia (Bambara: Tutu; Yoruba: Ìdòfún) is an evergreen tropical tree of Africa, found in various types of deciduous woodland most frequently in poorly drained areas and inland at moderate elevations. It is also known as mmupudu (by Tswana-speaking South Africans), mupundu or mobola plum after the fruit, which is considered tasty and causes the tree to be spared when woodland is cleared for cultivation.

It grows in the Guinean savanna region of West Africa, from Senegal across to Chad, then in seasonal woodland across the equator through Kenya and the eastern side of the continent, and from there in deciduous Miombo woodland inland to Zambia and Zimbabwe. It is also native to Madagascar. Its southernmost reach is just outside the tropics in the Northern Provinces]] of South Africa, at about 25°S.

== Description ==
Over its great range the tree varies a good deal in appearance. In areas with high rainfall (about 1,000 millimetres (39 in) or more annually) it grows to its greatest size of about 20–22 metres (66–72 ft) with a crown around 20 metres (66 ft) across. The branches are heavy and may droop or grow erect, giving the tree an impressive shape. When rainfall is less, it adopts a mushroom shape and usually grows up to 15 metres (49 ft) only. It can be locally common, and at moderately high altitudes in south-central Africa it is sometimes the dominant tree in a type of closed woodland where the soil is very poorly drained and may be sodden for several months of the year.

It has rough, cork-like bark, and stiff leather-like leaves that have grey hairs on the underside. The edible fruits are plum-like, which turn yellow-brown when ripe.

== Uses ==
A traditional food plant in Africa, this little-known fruit has potential to improve nutrition, boost food security, foster rural development and support sustainable landcare. The wood is very hard and heavy, for it contains silica crystals; it is therefore difficult to work, but unfortunately is not durable and so is little used, although it makes good charcoal. However, the main value of the tree is the delicious fruit, which appears early in the dry season and can be harvested over three or more months. It is used as a snack, and the kernel has a high oil content. The crushed pulp of the fruit is an ingredient in drinks, and since it ferments well, is often used to make alcoholic drinks as well.

It is also used for faith healing by some indigenous churches in Zimbabwe.
