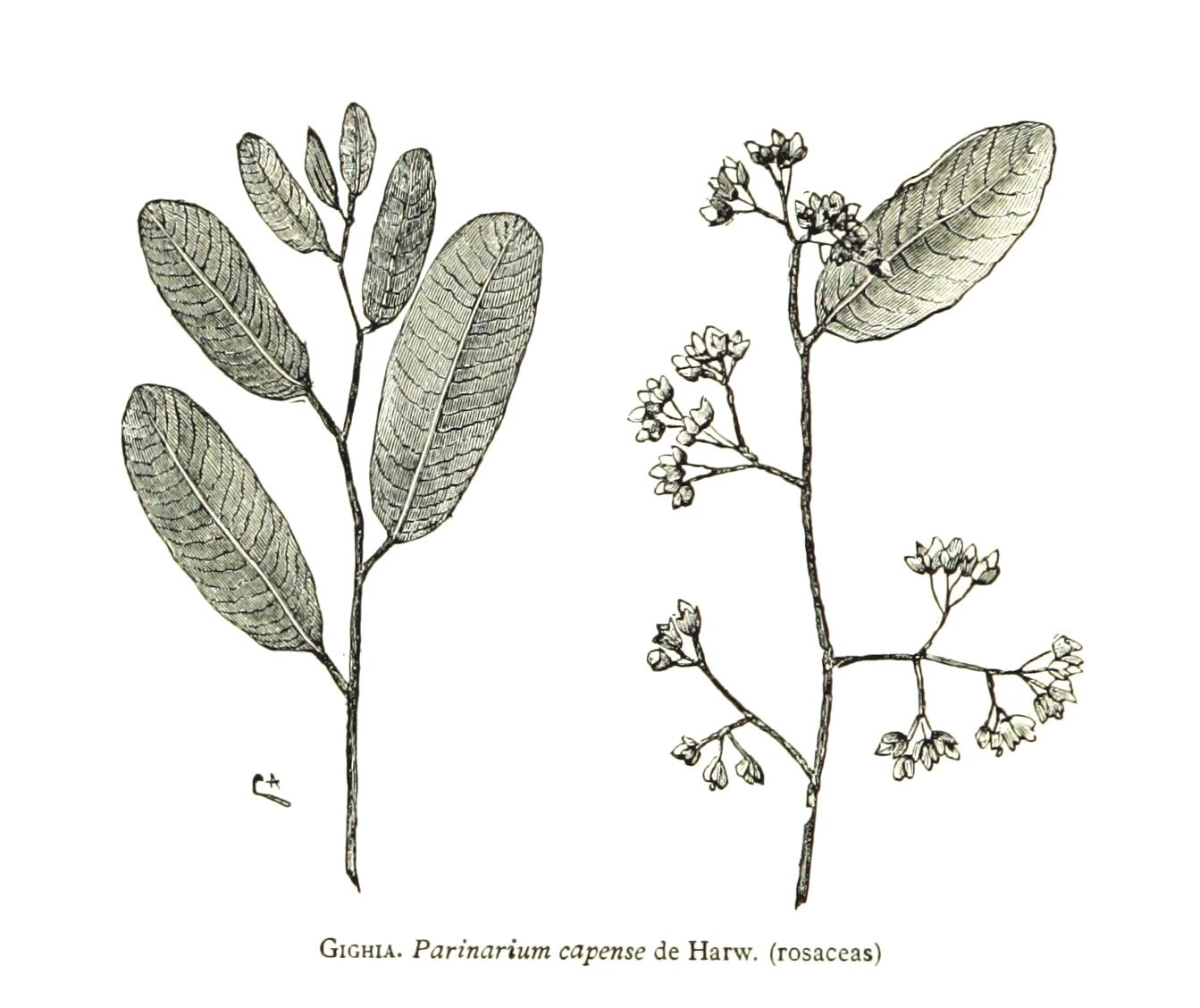
- foliage and inflorescences

Scientific classification
- Kingdom: Plantae
- Clade: Tracheophytes
- Clade: Angiosperms
- Clade: Eudicots
- Clade: Rosids
- Order: Malpighiales
- Family: Chrysobalanaceae
- Genus: Parinari
- Species: P. capensis

Binomial name
- Parinari capensis Harv.

Synonyms
- Ferolia capensis (Harv.) Kuntze

= Parinari capensis =

Sand apple

Species of flowering plant

Parinari capensis, the sand apple, is a species of flowering plant in the family Chrysobalanaceae. It is found in Botswana, DRC, Mozambique, Namibia, South Africa, Tanzania and Zimbabwe. It is 20 centimetres (7.9 in) tall. The leaves are elliptic with a white underside. It has small white flowers and a hairy sand-coloured calyx.

== Habitat ==
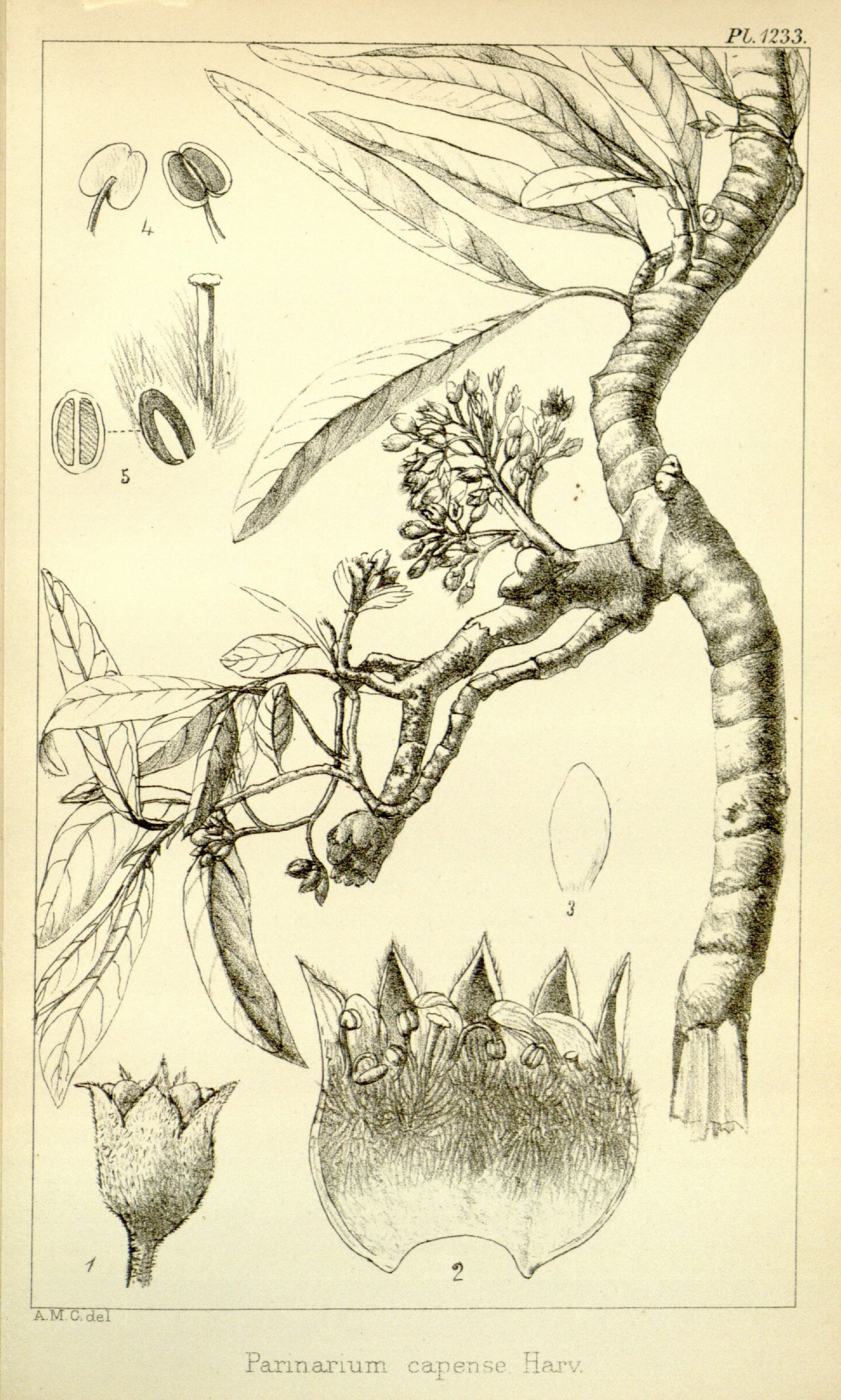
habit and flowers

The species can be found on sand, in open woodland and grassland on the elevation of 1,200–1,600 metres (3,900–5,200 ft). It blooms from September to October. The species is considered a geoxyle with a substantial part of the plant growing under the ground, an adaptation to fire-prone habitats. They have been considered therefore as forming immortal underground forests of great age.

== Uses ==
The plant is used for anti-malaria purposes.
