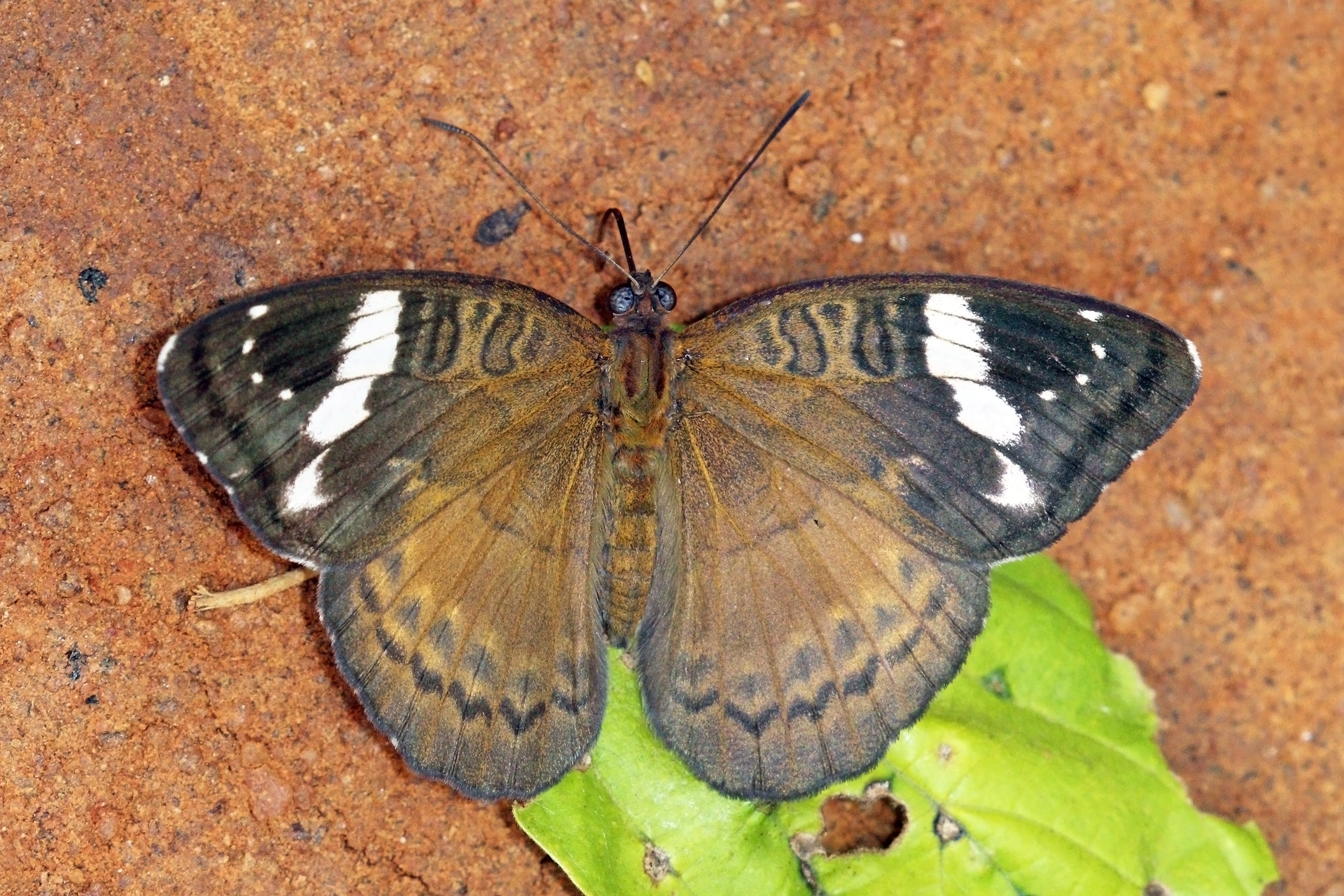
- Female E. a. transgressa Bobiri Forest, Ghana

Scientific classification
- Kingdom: Animalia
- Phylum: Arthropoda
- Clade: Pancrustacea
- Class: Insecta
- Order: Lepidoptera
- Family: Nymphalidae
- Genus: Euriphene
- Species: E. aridatha

Binomial name
- Euriphene aridatha (Hewitson, 1866)

Synonyms
- Aterica aridatha Hewitson, 1866; Euriphene (Euriphene) aridatha; Aterica feronia Staudinger, 1891

= Euriphene aridatha =

Species of butterfly

Euriphene aridatha, the dark nymph, is a butterfly in the family Nymphalidae. It is found in Sierra Leone, Liberia, Ivory Coast, Ghana, Togo, Nigeria and Cameroon. The habitat consists of forests.

== Subspecies ==
- Euriphene aridatha aridatha (Nigeria, western Cameroon)
- Euriphene aridatha camerunica d’Abrera, 2004 (Cameroon)
- Euriphene aridatha feronia (Staudinger, 1891) (Sierra Leone, Liberia, western Ivory Coast)
- Euriphene aridatha transgressa Hecq, 1994 (eastern Ivory Coast, Ghana, Togo)

Torben Larsen developed a species numbering system for his 2005 publication Butterflies of West Africa. The subspecies is #976. The 'Larsen' numbers have since been used with permission in A Sharp Eye on Butterflies of Ghana.
