= List of butterflies of the Republic of the Congo =

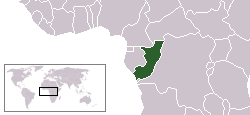
Location of the Republic of the Congo

This is a list of butterflies of the Republic of the Congo. About 892 species are known from the Republic of the Congo, 20 of which are endemic.

== Papilionidae ==
=== Papilioninae ===
==== Papilionini ====
- Papilio antimachus Drury, 1782
- Papilio zalmoxis Hewitson, 1864
- Papilio nireus Linnaeus, 1758
- Papilio chrapkowskoides nurettini Koçak, 1983
- Papilio sosia pulchra Berger, 1950
- Papilio cynorta Fabricius, 1793
- Papilio dardanus Brown, 1776
- Papilio phorcas congoanus Rothschild, 1896
- Papilio zenobia Fabricius, 1775
- Papilio filaprae Suffert, 1904
- Papilio gallienus Distant, 1879
- Papilio mechowi Dewitz, 1881
- Papilio hesperus Westwood, 1843

==== Leptocercini ====
- Graphium antheus (Cramer, 1779)
- Graphium policenes (Cramer, 1775)
- Graphium biokoensis (Gauthier, 1984)
- Graphium policenoides (Holland, 1892)
- Graphium colonna (Ward, 1873)
- Graphium illyris hamatus (Joicey & Talbot, 1918)
- Graphium angolanus baronis (Ungemach, 1932)
- Graphium ridleyanus (White, 1843)
- Graphium leonidas (Fabricius, 1793)
- Graphium tynderaeus (Fabricius, 1793)
- Graphium latreillianus theorini (Aurivillius, 1881)
- Graphium adamastor (Boisduval, 1836)
- Graphium schubotzi (Schultze, 1913)
- Graphium almansor escherichi (Gaede, 1915)
- Graphium auriger (Butler, 1876)
- Graphium fulleri fulleri (Grose-Smith, 1883)
- Graphium fulleri boulleti (Le Cerf, 1912)
- Graphium ucalegonides (Staudinger, 1884)
- Graphium hachei hachei (Dewitz, 1881)
- Graphium hachei moebii (Suffert, 1904)
- Graphium aurivilliusi (Seeldrayers, 1896)
- Graphium ucalegon (Hewitson, 1865)
- Graphium simoni (Aurivillius, 1899)

== Pieridae ==
=== Pseudopontiinae ===
- Pseudopontia paradoxa (Felder & Felder, 1869)

=== Coliadinae ===
- Eurema brigitta (Stoll, [1780])
- Eurema regularis (Butler, 1876)
- Eurema hecabe solifera (Butler, 1875)
- Eurema senegalensis (Boisduval, 1836)
- Catopsilia florella (Fabricius, 1775)

=== Pierinae ===
- Colotis celimene sudanicus (Aurivillius, 1905)
- Nepheronia argia (Fabricius, 1775)
- Nepheronia pharis (Boisduval, 1836)
- Nepheronia thalassina verulanus (Ward, 1871)
- Leptosia alcesta (Stoll, [1782])
- Leptosia hybrida Bernardi, 1952
- Leptosia marginea (Mabille, 1890)
- Leptosia nupta (Butler, 1873)

==== Pierini ====
- Appias epaphia (Cramer, [1779])
- Appias perlucens (Butler, 1898)
- Appias phaola (Doubleday, 1847)
- Appias sabina (Felder & Felder, [1865])
- Appias sylvia (Fabricius, 1775)
- Mylothris alcuana Grünberg, 1910
- Mylothris asphodelus Butler, 1888
- Mylothris chloris (Fabricius, 1775)
- Mylothris continua maxima Berger, 1981
- Mylothris flaviana interposita Joicey & Talbot, 1921
- Mylothris hilara goma Berger, 1981
- Mylothris rhodope (Fabricius, 1775)
- Mylothris schumanni Suffert, 1904
- Dixeia capricornus falkensteinii (Dewitz, 1879)
- Dixeia cebron (Ward, 1871)
- Belenois aurota (Fabricius, 1793)
- Belenois calypso dentigera Butler, 1888
- Belenois sudanensis pseudodentigera Berger, 1981
- Belenois theuszi (Dewitz, 1889)

== Lycaenidae ==
=== Miletinae ===
==== Liphyrini ====
- Euliphyra mirifica Holland, 1890
- Euliphyra leucyania (Hewitson, 1874)
- Aslauga confusa Libert, 1994
- Aslauga kallimoides Schultze, 1912
- Aslauga lamborni Bethune-Baker, 1914
- Aslauga pandora Druce, 1913
- Aslauga purpurascens Holland, 1890
- Aslauga vininga (Hewitson, 1875)

==== Miletini ====
- Megalopalpus metaleucus Karsch, 1893
- Megalopalpus zymna (Westwood, 1851)
- Lachnocnema triangularis Libert, 1996
- Lachnocnema emperamus (Snellen, 1872)
- Lachnocnema divergens Gaede, 1915
- Lachnocnema reutlingeri Holland, 1892
- Lachnocnema nigrocellularis Libert, 1996
- Lachnocnema luna Druce, 1910
- Lachnocnema jolyana Libert, 1996
- Lachnocnema magna Aurivillius, 1895
- Lachnocnema albimacula Libert, 1996
- Lachnocnema exiguus Holland, 1890
- Lachnocnema congoensis Libert, 1996 (endemic)

=== Poritiinae ===
==== Liptenini ====
- Ptelina carnuta (Hewitson, 1873)
- Pentila bitje Druce, 1910
- Pentila christina Suffert, 1904
- Pentila cloetensi aspasia Grünberg, 1910
- Pentila fallax Bethune-Baker, 1915
- Pentila inconspicua Druce, 1910
- Pentila nero (Grose-Smith & Kirby, 1894) (endemic)
- Pentila pauli leopardina Schultze, 1923
- Pentila rotha Hewitson, 1873
- Pentila tachyroides Dewitz, 1879
- Pentila torrida (Kirby, 1887)
- Pentila umangiana prodita Schultze, 1923
- Liptenara hiendlmayri (Dewitz, 1887)
- Telipna aurivillii Rebel, 1914
- Telipna albofasciata Aurivillius, 1910
- Telipna ja Bethune-Baker, 1926
- Telipna cameroonensis Jackson, 1969
- Telipna cuypersi Libert, 2005
- Telipna atrinervis Hulstaert, 1924
- Telipna villiersi Stempffer, 1965
- Telipna acraeoides (Grose-Smith & Kirby, 1890)
- Telipna hollandi exsuperia Hulstaert, 1924
- Telipna citrimaculata Schultze, 1916
- Telipna transverstigma Druce, 1910
- Telipna sanguinea (Plötz, 1880)
- Telipna nyanza katangae Stempffer, 1961
- Telipna ruspinoides Schultze, 1923
- Ornipholidotos kirbyi (Aurivillius. 1895)
- Ornipholidotos ugandae goodi Libert, 2000
- Ornipholidotos bitjeensis Stempffer, 1957
- Ornipholidotos gabonensis Stempffer, 1947
- Ornipholidotos bakotae Stempffer, 1962
- Ornipholidotos etoumbi Stempffer, 1967
- Ornipholidotos katangae kelle Stempffer, 1967
- Ornipholidotos annae Libert, 2005
- Ornipholidotos amieti Libert, 2005
- Ornipholidotos dowsetti Collins & Larsen, 2000 (endemic)
- Ornipholidotos overlaeti fontainei Libert, 2005
- Ornipholidotos congoensis Stempffer, 1964
- Ornipholidotos likouala Stempffer, 1969 (endemic)
- Ornipholidotos jacksoni occidentalis Libert, 2005
- Ornipholidotos sylpha (Kirby, 1890)
- Ornipholidotos nbeti Libert, 2005
- Ornipholidotos henrii Libert, 2000
- Ornipholidotos tirza (Hewitson, 1873)
- Ornipholidotos nancy Collins & Larsen, 2000 (endemic)
- Ornipholidotos paradoxa (Druce, 1910)
- Ornipholidotos perfragilis (Holland, 1890)
- Torbenia aurivilliusi (Stempffer, 1967)
- Torbenia stempfferi cuypersi Libert, 2005
- Mimacraea abriana Libert & Collins, 2000
- Mimacraea apicalis gabonica Libert, 2000
- Mimacraea krausei Dewitz, 1889
- Mimacraea landbecki Druce, 1910
- Mimacraea neurata Holland, 1895
- Mimacraea fulvaria Aurivillius, 1895
- Mimeresia cellularis (Kirby, 1890)
- Mimeresia debora debora (Kirby, 1890)
- Mimeresia debora deborula (Aurivillius, 1899)
- Mimeresia drucei (Stempffer, 1954)
- Mimeresia moreelsi tessmanni (Grünberg, 1910)
- Mimeresia pseudocellularis Stempffer, 1968 (endemic)
- Mimeresia russulus (Druce, 1910)
- Liptena amabilis Schultze, 1923
- Liptena batesana Bethune-Baker, 1926
- Liptena congoana Hawker-Smith, 1933
- Liptena decipiens etoumbi Stempffer, Bennett & May, 1974
- Liptena decipiens leucostola (Holland, 1890)
- Liptena durbania Bethune-Baker, 1915
- Liptena fatima (Kirby, 1890)
- Liptena flavicans praeusta Schultze, 1917
- Liptena inframacula Hawker-Smith, 1933
- Liptena modesta (Kirby, 1890)
- Liptena nigromarginata Stempffer, 1961
- Liptena ochrea Hawker-Smith, 1933
- Liptena opaca centralis Stempffer, Bennett & May, 1974
- Liptena orubrum (Holland, 1890)
- Liptena ouesso ouesso Stempffer, Bennett & May, 1974
- Liptena ouesso mayombe Stempffer, Bennett & May, 1974
- Liptena perobscura Druce, 1910
- Liptena praestans congoensis Schultze, 1923
- Liptena turbata (Kirby, 1890)
- Liptena undularis Hewitson, 1866
- Liptena xanthostola (Holland, 1890)
- Obania tullia (Staudinger, 1892)
- Kakumia ferruginea (Schultze, 1923)
- Kakumia ideoides (Dewitz, 1887)
- Tetrarhanis ilala etoumbi (Stempffer, 1964)
- Tetrarhanis ilma (Hewitson, 1873)
- Tetrarhanis nubifera (Druce, 1910)
- Tetrarhanis okwangwo Larsen, 1998
- Tetrarhanis rougeoti (Stempffer, 1954)
- Tetrarhanis simplex (Aurivillius, 1895)
- Tetrarhanis souanke (Stempffer, 1962) (endemic)
- Tetrarhanis stempfferi (Berger, 1954)
- Falcuna hollandi nigricans Stempffer & Bennett, 1963
- Falcuna lybia (Staudinger, 1892)
- Falcuna margarita (Suffert, 1904)
- Falcuna synesia gabonensis Stempffer & Bennett, 1963
- Larinopoda lircaea (Hewitson, 1866)
- Larinopoda tera (Hewitson, 1873)
- Micropentila adelgitha (Hewitson, 1874)
- Micropentila alberta (Staudinger, 1892)
- Micropentila bakotae Stempffer & Bennett, 1965 (endemic)
- Micropentila brunnea centralis Bennett, 1966
- Micropentila cingulum Druce, 1910
- Micropentila flavopunctata Stempffer & Bennett, 1965
- Micropentila fulvula Hawker-Smith, 1933
- Micropentila gabunica Stempffer & Bennett, 1965
- Micropentila kelleana Stempffer & Bennett, 1965 (endemic)
- Micropentila ogojae Stempffer & Bennett, 1965
- Micropentila souanke Stempffer & Bennett, 1965 (endemic)
- Micropentila ugandae Hawker-Smith, 1933
- Pseuderesia eleaza (Hewitson, 1873)
- Eresina bergeri Stempffer, 1956
- Eresina likouala Stempffer, 1962 (endemic)
- Eresina rougeoti Stempffer, 1956
- Eresiomera campbelli Collins & Larsen, 1998
- Eresiomera clenchi (Stempffer, 1961)
- Eresiomera isca (Hewitson, 1873)
- Eresiomera magnimacula (Rebel, 1914)
- Eresiomera nancy Collins & Larsen, 1998
- Eresiomera osheba (Holland, 1890)
- Eresiomera ouesso (Stempffer, 1962)
- Eresiomera paradoxa (Schultze, 1917)
- Eresiomera phaeochiton (Grünberg, 1910)
- Eresiomera phillipi Collins & Larsen, 1998
- Eresiomera rougeoti (Stempffer, 1961)
- Eresiomera rutilo (Druce, 1910)
- Citrinophila erastus (Hewitson, 1866)
- Citrinophila tenera (Kirby, 1887)
- Citrinophila terias Joicey & Talbot, 1921
- Citrinophila unipunctata Bethune-Baker, 1908
- Argyrocheila undifera Staudinger, 1892

==== Epitolini ====
- Toxochitona gerda (Kirby, 1890)
- Toxochitona sankuru Stempffer, 1961
- Iridana exquisita (Grose-Smith, 1898)
- Epitola posthumus (Fabricius, 1793)
- Epitola urania Kirby, 1887
- Epitola uranioides uranoides Libert, 1999
- Cerautola ceraunia (Hewitson, 1873)
- Cerautola crowleyi leucographa Libert, 1999
- Cerautola miranda vidua (Talbot, 1935)
- Cerautola hewitsoni (Mabille, 1877)
- Cerautola hewitsonioides (Hawker-Smith, 1933)
- Geritola amieti Libert, 1999
- Geritola dubia (Jackson, 1964)
- Geritola gerina (Hewitson, 1878)
- Geritola goodii (Holland, 1890)
- Geritola larae Collins & Libert, 1999
- Geritola mirifica (Jackson, 1964)
- Geritola nitidica Libert & Collins, 1999
- Stempfferia carcassoni Jackson, 1962
- Stempfferia alba (Jackson, 1962)
- Stempfferia annae Libert, 1999
- Stempfferia badura (Kirby, 1890)
- Stempfferia cercene (Hewitson, 1873)
- Stempfferia cercenoides (Holland, 1890)
- Stempfferia cinerea (Berger, 1981)
- Stempfferia coerulea (Jackson, 1962)
- Stempfferia congoana (Aurivillius, 1923)
- Stempfferia flavoantennata (Roche, 1954)
- Stempfferia gordoni (Druce, 1903)
- Stempfferia insulana (Aurivillius, 1923)
- Stempfferia iturina (Joicey & Talbot, 1921)
- Stempfferia magnifica (Jackson, 1964)
- Stempfferia marginata (Kirby, 1887)
- Stempfferia michelae centralis Libert, 1999
- Stempfferia similis Libert, 1999
- Stempfferia sylviae Libert, 1999
- Stempfferia tumentia (Druce, 1910)
- Stempfferia zelza (Hewitson, 1873)
- Cephetola catuna (Kirby, 1890)
- Cephetola cephena (Hewitson, 1873)
- Cephetola ghesquierei (Roche, 1954)
- Cephetola maculata (Hawker-Smith, 1926)
- Cephetola nigeriae (Jackson, 1962)
- Cephetola ouesso (Jackson, 1962)
- Cephetola pinodes budduana (Talbot, 1937)
- Cephetola sublustris (Bethune-Baker, 1904)
- Cephetola vinalli (Talbot, 1935)
- Cephetola viridana (Joicey & Talbot, 1921)
- Batelusia zebra Druce, 1910
- Pseudoneaveia jacksoni Stempffer, 1964 (endemic)
- Neaveia lamborni orientalis Jackson, 1962
- Epitolina dispar (Kirby, 1887)
- Epitolina melissa (Druce, 1888)
- Epitolina collinsi Libert, 2000
- Epitolina larseni Libert, 2000
- Hypophytala benitensis (Holland, 1890)
- Hypophytala henleyi (Kirby, 1890)
- Hypophytala hyetta (Hewitson, 1873)
- Hypophytala reducta (Aurivillius, 1923)
- Hypophytala ultramarina Libert & Collins, 1999
- Phytala elais Westwood, 1851
- Neoepitola barombiensis (Kirby, 1890)
- Aethiopana honorius (Fabricius, 1793)
- Hewitsonia bitjeana Bethune-Baker, 1915
- Hewitsonia beryllina Schultze, 1916
- Hewitsonia boisduvalii (Hewitson, 1869)
- Hewitsonia inexpectata Bouyer, 1997
- Hewitsonia kirbyi Dewitz, 1879
- Hewitsonia similis (Aurivillius, 1891)
- Powellana cottoni Bethune-Baker, 1908

=== Aphnaeinae ===
- Pseudaletis michelae Libert, 2007
- Pseudaletis antimachus (Staudinger, 1888)
- Pseudaletis batesi Druce, 1910
- Lipaphnaeus leonina (Druce, 1910)
- Cigaritis apuleia (Hulstaert, 1924)
- Cigaritis dufranei (Bouyer, 1991)
- Cigaritis homeyeri (Dewitz, 1887)
- Aphnaeus argyrocyclus Holland, 1890
- Aphnaeus asterius Plötz, 1880
- Aphnaeus chapini occidentalis Clench, 1963
- Aphnaeus orcas (Drury, 1782)

=== Theclinae ===
- Myrina silenus (Fabricius, 1775)
- Myrina subornata Lathy, 1903
- Oxylides albata (Aurivillius, 1895)
- Oxylides gloveri Hawker-Smith, 1929
- Syrmoptera bonifacei Stempffer, 1961
- Syrmoptera melanomitra Karsch, 1895
- Dapidodigma demeter Clench, 1961
- Hypolycaena antifaunus (Westwood, 1851)
- Hypolycaena clenchi Larsen, 1997
- Hypolycaena dubia Aurivillius, 1895
- Hypolycaena hatita Hewitson, 1865
- Hypolycaena kakumi Larsen, 1997
- Hypolycaena lebona (Hewitson, 1865)
- Hypolycaena naara Hewitson, 1873
- Hypolycaena nigra Bethune-Baker, 1914
- Iolaus bolissus Hewitson, 1873
- Iolaus agnes Aurivillius, 1898
- Iolaus aurivillii Röber, 1900
- Iolaus bellina exquisita (Riley, 1928)
- Iolaus coelestis Bethune-Baker, 1926
- Iolaus creta Hewitson, 1878
- Iolaus cytaeis Hewitson, 1875
- Iolaus fontainei (Stempffer, 1956)
- Iolaus frater (Joicey & Talbot, 1921)
- Iolaus hemicyanus barnsi (Joicey & Talbot, 1921)
- Iolaus kelle Stempffer, 1967 (endemic)
- Iolaus maesa (Hewitson, 1862)
- Iolaus neavei (Druce, 1910)
- Iolaus nolaensis (Stempffer, 1951)
- Iolaus pollux Aurivillius, 1895
- Iolaus sappirus (Druce, 1902)
- Iolaus iulus Hewitson, 1869
- Iolaus parasilanus (Riley, 1928)
- Iolaus alcibiades Kirby, 1871
- Iolaus paneperata Druce, 1890
- Iolaus poecilaon (Riley, 1928)
- Iolaus caesareus cleopatrae Collins & Larsen, 2000
- Iolaus timon (Fabricius, 1787)
- Pilodeudorix mimeta (Karsch, 1895)
- Pilodeudorix ula (Karsch, 1895)
- Pilodeudorix virgata (Druce, 1891)
- Pilodeudorix anetia (Hulstaert, 1924)
- Pilodeudorix angelita (Suffert, 1904)
- Pilodeudorix aruma (Hewitson, 1873)
- Pilodeudorix azurea (Stempffer, 1964)
- Pilodeudorix infuscata (Stempffer, 1964)
- Pilodeudorix leonina indentata Libert, 2004
- Pilodeudorix mera (Hewitson, 1873)
- Pilodeudorix otraeda genuba (Hewitson, 1875)
- Pilodeudorix camerona (Plötz, 1880)
- Pilodeudorix congoana (Aurivillius, 1923)
- Pilodeudorix kohli (Aurivillius, 1921)
- Pilodeudorix zela (Hewitson, 1869)
- Pilodeudorix hugoi Libert, 2004
- Pilodeudorix deritas (Hewitson, 1874)
- Pilodeudorix kiellandi (Congdon & Collins, 1998)
- Pilodeudorix pseudoderitas (Stempffer, 1964)
- Pilodeudorix violetta (Aurivillius, 1897)
- Paradeudorix cobaltina (Stempffer, 1964)
- Paradeudorix ituri (Bethune-Baker, 1908)
- Paradeudorix marginata (Stempffer, 1962)
- Paradeudorix moyambina (Bethune-Baker, 1904)
- Paradeudorix petersi (Stempffer & Bennett, 1956)
- Hypomyrina mimetica Libert, 2004
- Hypomyrina fournierae Gabriel, 1939
- Deudorix caliginosa Lathy, 1903
- Deudorix kayonza Stempffer, 1956
- Deudorix lorisona (Hewitson, 1862)
- Deudorix odana Druce, 1887

=== Polyommatinae ===
==== Lycaenesthini ====
- Anthene afra (Bethune-Baker, 1910)
- Anthene bipuncta (Joicey & Talbot, 1921)
- Anthene kampala (Bethune-Baker, 1910)
- Anthene lachares (Hewitson, 1878)
- Anthene larydas (Cramer, 1780)
- Anthene leptines (Hewitson, 1874)
- Anthene ligures (Hewitson, 1874)
- Anthene liodes (Hewitson, 1874)
- Anthene locuples (Grose-Smith, 1898)
- Anthene lysicles (Hewitson, 1874)
- Anthene mahota (Grose-Smith, 1887)
- Anthene makala (Bethune-Baker, 1910)
- Anthene ngoko Stempffer, 1962
- Anthene pyroptera (Aurivillius, 1895)
- Anthene rubricinctus (Holland, 1891)
- Anthene scintillula (Holland, 1891)
- Anthene sylvanus (Drury, 1773)
- Anthene xanthopoecilus (Holland, 1893)
- Anthene zenkeri (Karsch, 1895)
- Anthene lamprocles (Hewitson, 1878)
- Anthene lyzanius (Hewitson, 1874)
- Anthene quadricaudata (Bethune-Baker, 1926)
- Anthene chryseostictus (Bethune-Baker, 1910)
- Anthene likouala Stempffer, 1962
- Anthene lusones (Hewitson, 1874)
- Anthene lacides (Hewitson, 1874)
- Anthene lamias (Hewitson, 1878)
- Anthene lucretilis (Hewitson, 1874)
- Anthene rufoplagata (Bethune-Baker, 1910)
- Cupidesthes arescopa Bethune-Baker, 1910
- Cupidesthes caerulea Jackson, 1966
- Cupidesthes cuprifascia Joicey & Talbot, 1921
- Cupidesthes leonina (Bethune-Baker, 1903)
- Cupidesthes mimetica (Druce, 1910)
- Cupidesthes robusta Aurivillius, 1895
- Cupidesthes thyrsis (Kirby, 1878)

==== Polyommatini ====
- Cupidopsis cissus extensa Libert, 2003
- Uranothauma falkensteini (Dewitz, 1879)
- Uranothauma heritsia (Hewitson, 1876)
- Phlyaria cyara (Hewitson, 1876)
- Cacyreus audeoudi Stempffer, 1936
- Tuxentius carana (Hewitson, 1876)
- Azanus isis (Drury, 1773)
- Thermoniphas alberici (Dufrane, 1945)
- Thermoniphas fontainei Stempffer, 1956
- Thermoniphas fumosa Stempffer, 1952
- Thermoniphas plurilimbata Karsch, 1895
- Thermoniphas togara (Plötz, 1880)
- Oboronia guessfeldti (Dewitz, 1879)
- Oboronia ornata vestalis (Aurivillius, 1895)
- Oboronia pseudopunctatus (Strand, 1912)
- Oboronia punctatus (Dewitz, 1879)

== Riodinidae ==
=== Nemeobiinae ===
- Abisara tantalus caerulea Carpenter & Jackson, 1950
- Abisara caeca semicaeca Riley, 1932
- Abisara rutherfordii herwigii Dewitz, 1887
- Abisara gerontes gabunica Riley, 1932

== Nymphalidae ==
=== Danainae ===
==== Danaini ====
- Danaus chrysippus alcippus (Cramer, 1777)
- Danaus chrysippus orientis (Aurivillius, 1909)
- Amauris niavius (Linnaeus, 1758)
- Amauris tartarea Mabille, 1876
- Amauris vashti (Butler, 1869)

=== Satyrinae ===
==== Elymniini ====
- Elymniopsis bammakoo (Westwood, [1851])

==== Melanitini ====
- Gnophodes betsimena parmeno Doubleday, 1849
- Gnophodes chelys (Fabricius, 1793)

==== Satyrini ====
- Bicyclus alboplaga (Rebel, 1914)
- Bicyclus auricruda fulgidus Fox, 1963
- Bicyclus ephorus bergeri Condamin, 1965
- Bicyclus evadne elionias (Hewitson, 1866)
- Bicyclus golo (Aurivillius, 1893)
- Bicyclus hewitsoni (Doumet, 1861)
- Bicyclus iccius (Hewitson, 1865)
- Bicyclus ignobilis eurini Condamin & Fox, 1963
- Bicyclus italus (Hewitson, 1865)
- Bicyclus mandanes Hewitson, 1873
- Bicyclus medontias (Hewitson, 1873)
- Bicyclus nobilis (Aurivillius, 1893)
- Bicyclus rhacotis (Hewitson, 1866)
- Bicyclus martius sanaos (Hewitson, 1866)
- Bicyclus sandace (Hewitson, 1877)
- Bicyclus sciathis (Hewitson, 1866)
- Bicyclus sophrosyne (Plötz, 1880)
- Bicyclus sweadneri Fox, 1963
- Bicyclus technatis (Hewitson, 1877)
- Bicyclus trilophus (Rebel, 1914)
- Bicyclus vulgaris (Butler, 1868)
- Bicyclus xeneas (Hewitson, 1866)
- Bicyclus xeneoides Condamin, 1961
- Hallelesis asochis congoensis (Joicey & Talbot, 1921)
- Heteropsis peitho (Plötz, 1880)
- Ypthima doleta Kirby, 1880
- Ypthima impura Elwes & Edwards, 1893
- Ypthima pulchra Overlaet, 1954
- Ypthima pupillaris Butler, 1888

=== Charaxinae ===
==== Charaxini ====
- Charaxes fulvescens (Aurivillius, 1891)
- Charaxes protoclea protonothodes van Someren, 1971
- Charaxes boueti Feisthamel, 1850
- Charaxes cynthia kinduana Le Cerf, 1923
- Charaxes lucretius intermedius van Someren, 1971
- Charaxes lactetinctus Karsch, 1892
- Charaxes castor (Cramer, 1775)
- Charaxes brutus angustus Rothschild, 1900
- Charaxes pollux (Cramer, 1775)
- Charaxes druceanus brazza Turlin, 1987
- Charaxes eudoxus mechowi Rothschild, 1900
- Charaxes richelmanni Röber, 1936
- Charaxes numenes aequatorialis van Someren, 1972
- Charaxes tiridates tiridatinus Röber, 1936
- Charaxes bipunctatus ugandensis van Someren, 1972
- Charaxes mixtus Rothschild, 1894
- Charaxes bohemani Felder & Felder, 1859
- Charaxes smaragdalis smaragdalis Butler, 1866
- Charaxes smaragdalis leopoldi Ghesquiére, 1933
- Charaxes imperialis dargei Collins, 1989
- Charaxes ameliae Doumet, 1861
- Charaxes pythodoris occidens van Someren, 1963
- Charaxes hadrianus Ward, 1871
- Charaxes nobilis Druce, 1873
- Charaxes superbus Schultze, 1909
- Charaxes lydiae Holland, 1917
- Charaxes acraeoides Druce, 1908
- Charaxes fournierae Le Moult, 1930
- Charaxes zingha (Stoll, 1780)
- Charaxes etesipe (Godart, 1824)
- Charaxes penricei dealbata van Someren, 1966
- Charaxes eupale latimargo Joicey & Talbot, 1921
- Charaxes subornatus Schultze, 1916
- Charaxes anticlea proadusta van Someren, 1971
- Charaxes thysi Capronnier, 1889
- Charaxes hildebrandti (Dewitz, 1879)
- Charaxes virilis van Someren & Jackson, 1952
- Charaxes catachrous van Someren & Jackson, 1952
- Charaxes etheocles ochracea van Someren & Jackson, 1957
- Charaxes cedreatis Hewitson, 1874
- Charaxes subrubidus van Someren, 1972
- Charaxes viola picta van Someren & Jackson, 1952
- Charaxes pleione congoensis Plantrou, 1989
- Charaxes paphianus Ward, 1871
- Charaxes kahldeni Homeyer & Dewitz, 1882
- Charaxes nichetes Grose-Smith, 1883
- Charaxes lycurgus bernardiana Plantrou, 1978
- Charaxes zelica rougeoti Plantrou, 1978
- Charaxes porthos Grose-Smith, 1883
- Charaxes doubledayi Aurivillius, 1899
- Charaxes mycerina nausicaa Staudinger, 1891
- Charaxes galleyanus Darge & Minig, 1984 (endemic)
- Charaxes matakall Darge, 1985
- Charaxes teissieri Darge & Minig, 1984 (endemic)

==== Euxanthini ====
- Charaxes crossleyi (Ward, 1871)
- Charaxes trajanus (Ward, 1871)

==== Pallini ====
- Palla publius centralis van Someren, 1975
- Palla ussheri dobelli (Hall, 1919)
- Palla decius (Cramer, 1777)
- Palla violinitens coniger (Butler, 1896)

=== Nymphalinae ===
- Kallimoides rumia jadyae (Fox, 1968)
- Vanessula milca buechneri Dewitz, 1887

==== Nymphalini ====
- Antanartia delius (Drury, 1782)
- Junonia stygia (Aurivillius, 1894)
- Junonia gregorii Butler, 1896
- Junonia terea (Drury, 1773)
- Junonia westermanni Westwood, 1870
- Junonia cymodoce lugens (Schultze, 1912)
- Salamis cacta (Fabricius, 1793)
- Protogoniomorpha parhassus (Drury, 1782)
- Protogoniomorpha temora (Felder & Felder, 1867)
- Precis ceryne (Boisduval, 1847)
- Precis octavia (Cramer, 1777)
- Precis sinuata Plötz, 1880
- Hypolimnas anthedon (Doubleday, 1845)
- Hypolimnas dinarcha (Hewitson, 1865)
- Hypolimnas mechowi (Dewitz, 1884)
- Hypolimnas misippus (Linnaeus, 1764)
- Hypolimnas monteironis (Druce, 1874)
- Hypolimnas salmacis (Drury, 1773)

=== Cyrestinae ===
==== Cyrestini ====
- Cyrestis camillus (Fabricius, 1781)

=== Biblidinae ===
==== Biblidini ====
- Mesoxantha ethosea ethoseoides Rebel, 1914
- Ariadne actisanes (Hewitson, 1875)
- Ariadne albifascia (Joicey & Talbot, 1921)
- Ariadne enotrea suffusa (Joicey & Talbot, 1921)
- Neptidopsis ophione (Cramer, 1777)
- Eurytela alinda Mabille, 1893

==== Epicaliini ====
- Sevenia amulia amulia (Cramer, 1777)
- Sevenia amulia benguelae (Chapman, 1872)
- Sevenia boisduvali omissa (Rothschild, 1918)
- Sevenia consors (Rothschild & Jordan, 1903)
- Sevenia morantii (Trimen, 1881)
- Sevenia occidentalium (Mabille, 1876)
- Sevenia pechueli sangbae (Hecq & Peeters, 1992)

=== Limenitinae ===
==== Limenitidini ====
- Cymothoe altisidora (Hewitson, 1869)
- Cymothoe anitorgis (Hewitson, 1874)
- Cymothoe aramis aramis (Hewitson, 1865)
- Cymothoe aramis schoutedeni Overlaet, 1952
- Cymothoe arcuata Overlaet, 1945
- Cymothoe beckeri (Herrich-Schaeffer, 1858)
- Cymothoe caenis (Drury, 1773)
- Cymothoe capella (Ward, 1871)
- Cymothoe caprina Aurivillius, 1897
- Cymothoe coccinata (Hewitson, 1874)
- Cymothoe distincta Overlaet, 1944
- Cymothoe confusa Aurivillius, 1887
- Cymothoe eris Aurivillius, 1896
- Cymothoe excelsa Neustetter, 1912
- Cymothoe fontainei debauchei Overlaet, 1952
- Cymothoe fumana balluca Fox & Howarth, 1968
- Cymothoe fumana villiersi Fox, 1968
- Cymothoe haynae diphyia Karsch, 1894
- Cymothoe heliada (Hewitson, 1874)
- Cymothoe herminia (Grose-Smith, 1887)
- Cymothoe hesiodotus Staudinger, 1890
- Cymothoe hyarbita hyarbita (Hewitson, 1866)
- Cymothoe hyarbita hyarbitina Aurivillius, 1897
- Cymothoe indamora (Hewitson, 1866)
- Cymothoe jodutta ciceronis (Ward, 1871)
- Cymothoe lucasii binotorum Darge, 1985
- Cymothoe lucasii minigorum Darge, 1985
- Cymothoe lurida hesione Weymer, 1907
- Cymothoe lurida tristis Overlaet, 1952
- Cymothoe oemilius (Doumet, 1859)
- Cymothoe orphnina suavis Schultze, 1913
- Cymothoe reinholdi (Plötz, 1880)
- Cymothoe sangaris (Godart, 1824)
- Pseudoneptis bugandensis ianthe Hemming, 1964
- Pseudacraea boisduvalii (Doubleday, 1845)
- Pseudacraea clarkii Butler & Rothschild, 1892
- Pseudacraea dolomena (Hewitson, 1865)
- Pseudacraea rubrobasalis Aurivillius, 1903
- Pseudacraea eurytus (Linnaeus, 1758)
- Pseudacraea kuenowii gottbergi Dewitz, 1884
- Pseudacraea lucretia protracta (Butler, 1874)
- Pseudacraea semire (Cramer, 1779)
- Pseudacraea warburgi Aurivillius, 1892

==== Neptidini ====
- Neptis agouale Pierre-Baltus, 1978
- Neptis alta Overlaet, 1955
- Neptis continuata Holland, 1892
- Neptis jamesoni Godman & Salvin, 1890
- Neptis kiriakoffi Overlaet, 1955
- Neptis lermanni Aurivillius, 1896
- Neptis liberti Pierre & Pierre-Baltus, 1998
- Neptis melicerta (Drury, 1773)
- Neptis metanira Holland, 1892
- Neptis mixophyes Holland, 1892
- Neptis morosa Overlaet, 1955
- Neptis nebrodes Hewitson, 1874
- Neptis nicobule Holland, 1892
- Neptis nicomedes Hewitson, 1874
- Neptis nicoteles Hewitson, 1874
- Neptis nysiades Hewitson, 1868
- Neptis seeldrayersi Aurivillius, 1895
- Neptis serena Overlaet, 1955
- Neptis strigata Aurivillius, 1894
- Neptis trigonophora melicertula Strand, 1912
- Neptis troundi Pierre-Baltus, 1978

==== Adoliadini ====
- Catuna angustatum (Felder & Felder, 1867)
- Catuna oberthueri Karsch, 1894
- Euryphura athymoides Berger, 1981
- Euryphura chalcis (Felder & Felder, 1860)
- Euryphura plautilla (Hewitson, 1865)
- Euryphura porphyrion grassei Bernardi, 1965
- Euryphurana nobilis (Staudinger, 1891)
- Pseudargynnis hegemone (Godart, 1819)
- Aterica galene extensa Heron, 1909
- Cynandra opis bernardii Lagnel, 1967
- Euriphene splendida Collins & Larsen, 1997 (endemic)
- Euriphene abasa (Hewitson, 1866)
- Euriphene amicia (Hewitson, 1871)
- Euriphene atossa (Hewitson, 1865)
- Euriphene atropurpurea (Aurivillius, 1894)
- Euriphene atrovirens (Mabille, 1878)
- Euriphene barombina (Aurivillius, 1894)
- Euriphene gambiae gabonica Bernardi, 1966
- Euriphene glaucopis (Gaede, 1916)
- Euriphene grosesmithi (Staudinger, 1891)
- Euriphene incerta (Aurivillius, 1912)
- Euriphene karschi (Aurivillius, 1894)
- Euriphene milnei (Hewitson, 1865)
- Euriphene mundula (Grünberg, 1910)
- Euriphene pinkieana Bernardi, 1975
- Euriphene lysandra (Stoll, 1790)
- Euriphene melanops (Aurivillius, 1897)
- Bebearia tentyris seeldrayersi (Aurivillius, 1899)
- Bebearia carshena (Hewitson, 1871)
- Bebearia absolon (Fabricius, 1793)
- Bebearia micans (Aurivillius, 1899)
- Bebearia zonara (Butler, 1871)
- Bebearia mandinga (Felder & Felder, 1860)
- Bebearia oxione squalida (Talbot, 1928)
- Bebearia abesa (Hewitson, 1869)
- Bebearia partita (Aurivillius, 1895)
- Bebearia barce maculata (Aurivillius, 1912)
- Bebearia mardania (Fabricius, 1793)
- Bebearia cocalioides Hecq, 1988
- Bebearia guineensis (Felder & Felder, 1867)
- Bebearia cocalia katera (van Someren, 1939)
- Bebearia paludicola Holmes, 2001
- Bebearia sophus (Fabricius, 1793)
- Bebearia staudingeri (Aurivillius, 1893)
- Bebearia plistonax (Hewitson, 1874)
- Bebearia elpinice (Hewitson, 1869)
- Bebearia congolensis (Capronnier, 1889)
- Bebearia phranza phranza (Hewitson, 1865)
- Bebearia phranza fuscara Hecq, 1989
- Bebearia laetitia (Plötz, 1880)
- Bebearia flaminia (Staudinger, 1891)
- Bebearia nivaria (Ward, 1871)
- Bebearia phantasia concolor Hecq, 1988
- Bebearia maledicta (Strand, 1912)
- Bebearia tessmanni kwiluensis Hecq, 1989
- Bebearia cutteri cognata (Grünberg, 1910)
- Bebearia eliensis (Hewitson, 1866)
- Bebearia barombina (Staudinger, 1896)
- Bebearia octogramma (Grose-Smith & Kirby, 1889)
- Bebearia chloeropis (Bethune-Baker, 1908)
- Bebearia cinaethon (Hewitson, 1874)
- Bebearia intermedia (Bartel, 1905)
- Euphaedra lupercoides Rothschild, 1918
- Euphaedra medon celestis Hecq, 1986
- Euphaedra ombrophila Hecq, 1981 (endemic)
- Euphaedra clio Hecq, 1981
- Euphaedra zaddachii elephantina Staudinger, 1891
- Euphaedra mbamou Hecq, 1987
- Euphaedra hewitsoni Hecq, 1974
- Euphaedra lata Hecq, 1980
- Euphaedra hollandi Hecq, 1974
- Euphaedra diffusa Gaede, 1916
- Euphaedra imitans Holland, 1893
- Euphaedra aureola Kirby, 1889
- Euphaedra splendens Hecq, 1992
- Euphaedra campaspe (Felder & Felder, 1867)
- Euphaedra congo Hecq, 1985
- Euphaedra adonina spectacularis Hecq, 1997
- Euphaedra piriformis Hecq, 1982
- Euphaedra ceres electra Hecq, 1983
- Euphaedra sarita (Sharpe, 1891)
- Euphaedra grilloti Hecq, 1983
- Euphaedra rezia (Hewitson, 1866)
- Euphaedra jacksoni Hecq, 1980
- Euphaedra demeter Hecq, 1983
- Euphaedra subprotea Hecq, 1986
- Euphaedra fascinata Hecq, 1984
- Euphaedra eleus (Drury, 1782)
- Euphaedra simplex Hecq, 1978
- Euphaedra asteria Hecq, 1993 (endemic)
- Euphaedra edwardsii (van der Hoeven, 1845)
- Euphaedra ruspina (Hewitson, 1865)
- Euphaedra losinga wardi (Druce, 1874)
- Euphaedra mambili Hecq, 2001
- Euptera choveti Amiet & Collins, 1998
- Euptera crowleyi centralis Libert, 1995
- Euptera elabontas (Hewitson, 1871)
- Euptera falsathyma Schultze, 1916
- Euptera mimetica Collins & Amiet, 1998
- Euptera mocquerysi Staudinger, 1893
- Euptera pluto (Ward, 1873)
- Pseudathyma callina (Grose-Smith, 1898)
- Pseudathyma cyrili Chovet, 2002
- Pseudathyma martini Collins, 2002
- Pseudathyma michelae Libert, 2002
- Pseudathyma neptidina Karsch, 1894

=== Heliconiinae ===
==== Acraeini ====
- Acraea admatha Hewitson, 1865
- Acraea camaena (Drury, 1773)
- Acraea endoscota Le Doux, 1928
- Acraea leucographa Ribbe, 1889
- Acraea neobule Doubleday, 1847
- Acraea quirina (Fabricius, 1781)
- Acraea cepheus (Linnaeus, 1758)
- Acraea abdera Hewitson, 1852
- Acraea egina (Cramer, 1775)
- Acraea pseudegina Westwood, 1852
- Acraea rogersi Hewitson, 1873
- Acraea consanguinea (Aurivillius, 1899)
- Acraea elongata (Butler, 1874)
- Acraea epaea (Cramer, 1779)
- Acraea epiprotea (Butler, 1874)
- Acraea excisa (Butler, 1874)
- Acraea tellus (Aurivillius, 1893)
- Acraea vestalis stavelia (Suffert, 1904)
- Acraea acerata Hewitson, 1874
- Acraea alciope Hewitson, 1852
- Acraea aurivillii Staudinger, 1896
- Acraea circeis (Drury, 1782)
- Acraea serena (Fabricius, 1775)
- Acraea jodutta (Fabricius, 1793)
- Acraea oberthueri Butler, 1895
- Acraea peneleos pelasgius Grose-Smith, 1900
- Acraea vesperalis Grose-Smith, 1890
- Acraea penelope Staudinger, 1896
- Acraea perenna Doubleday, 1847
- Acraea odzalae Collins, 1997 (endemic)

==== Vagrantini ====
- Lachnoptera anticlia (Hübner, 1819)
- Phalanta eurytis (Doubleday, 1847)
- Phalanta phalantha aethiopica (Rothschild & Jordan, 1903)

== Hesperiidae ==
=== Coeliadinae ===
- Coeliades bixana Evans, 1940
- Coeliades forestan (Stoll, [1782])
- Coeliades hanno (Plötz, 1879)
- Coeliades libeon (Druce, 1875)
- Coeliades pisistratus (Fabricius, 1793)
- Pyrrhochalcia iphis (Drury, 1773)

=== Pyrginae ===
==== Celaenorrhinini ====
- Loxolexis holocausta (Mabille, 1891)
- Celaenorrhinus aureus Collins & Larsen, 2005 (endemic)
- Celaenorrhinus beni Bethune-Baker, 1908
- Celaenorrhinus boadicea (Hewitson, 1877)
- Celaenorrhinus chrysoglossa (Mabille, 1891)
- Celaenorrhinus homeyeri (Plötz, 1880)
- Celaenorrhinus illustris (Mabille, 1891)
- Celaenorrhinus illustroides Miller, 1971
- Celaenorrhinus meditrina (Hewitson, 1877)
- Celaenorrhinus nigropunctata Bethune-Baker, 1908
- Celaenorrhinus ovalis Evans, 1937
- Celaenorrhinus rutilans (Mabille, 1877)
- Sarangesa majorella (Mabille, 1891)
- Sarangesa tertullianus (Fabricius, 1793)
- Sarangesa thecla (Plötz, 1879)

==== Tagiadini ====
- Tagiades flesus (Fabricius, 1781)
- Eagris decastigma fuscosa (Holland, 1893)
- Eagris lucetia (Hewitson, 1875)
- Eagris subalbida aurivillii (Neustetter, 1927)
- Eagris tetrastigma (Mabille, 1891)
- Calleagris lacteus (Mabille, 1877)
- Calleagris landbecki (Druce, 1910)
- Procampta rara Holland, 1892
- Abantis contigua Evans, 1937
- Abantis efulensis Holland, 1896
- Abantis ja Druce, 1909
- Abantis leucogaster (Mabille, 1890)
- Abantis lucretia etoumbiensis Miller, 1971
- Abantis rubra Holland, 1920

==== Carcharodini ====
- Spialia ploetzi (Aurivillius, 1891)

=== Hesperiinae ===
==== Aeromachini ====
- Astictopterus abjecta (Snellen, 1872)
- Kedestes brunneostriga (Plötz, 1884)
- Gorgyra afikpo Druce, 1909
- Gorgyra bina Evans, 1937
- Gorgyra diversata Evans, 1937
- Gorgyra kalinzu Evans, 1949
- Gorgyra minima Holland, 1896
- Gorgyra mocquerysii Holland, 1896
- Gorgyra rubescens Holland, 1896
- Gorgyra sara Evans, 1937
- Gyrogra subnotata (Holland, 1894)
- Teniorhinus ignita (Mabille, 1877)
- Teniorhinus watsoni Holland, 1892
- Ceratrichia argyrosticta (Plötz, 1879)
- Ceratrichia aurea Druce, 1910
- Ceratrichia clara medea Evans, 1937
- Ceratrichia flava Hewitson, 1878
- Ceratrichia phocion camerona Miller, 1971
- Ceratrichia semlikensis Joicey & Talbot, 1921
- Ceratrichia wollastoni Heron, 1909
- Pardaleodes bule Holland, 1896
- Pardaleodes edipus (Stoll, 1781)
- Pardaleodes incerta murcia (Plötz, 1883)
- Pardaleodes sator pusiella Mabille, 1877
- Pardaleodes tibullus (Fabricius, 1793)
- Pardaleodes xanthopeplus Holland, 1892
- Xanthodisca astrape (Holland, 1892)
- Rhabdomantis galatia (Hewitson, 1868)
- Rhabdomantis sosia (Mabille, 1891)
- Osmodes adosus (Mabille, 1890)
- Osmodes banghaasii Holland, 1896
- Osmodes costatus Aurivillius, 1896
- Osmodes distincta Holland, 1896
- Osmodes hollandi Evans, 1937
- Osmodes lux Holland, 1892
- Osmodes omar Swinhoe, 1916
- Osmodes thora (Plötz, 1884)
- Osphantes ogowena (Mabille, 1891)
- Acleros ploetzi Mabille, 1890
- Semalea arela (Mabille, 1891)
- Semalea pulvina (Plötz, 1879)
- Semalea sextilis (Plötz, 1886)
- Hypoleucis ophiusa (Hewitson, 1866)
- Hypoleucis tripunctata truda Evans, 1937
- Meza cybeutes (Holland, 1894)
- Meza elba (Evans, 1937)
- Meza indusiata (Mabille, 1891)
- Meza mabea (Holland, 1894)
- Paronymus xanthias (Mabille, 1891)
- Paronymus xanthioides (Holland, 1892)
- Andronymus caesar (Fabricius, 1793)
- Andronymus evander (Mabille, 1890)
- Andronymus gander Evans, 1947
- Andronymus helles Evans, 1937
- Andronymus hero Evans, 1937
- Andronymus marcus Usher, 1980
- Andronymus neander (Plötz, 1884)
- Gamia buchholzi (Plötz, 1879)
- Gamia shelleyi (Sharpe, 1890)
- Artitropa cama Evans, 1937
- Artitropa comus (Stoll, 1782)
- Artitropa reducta Aurivillius, 1925
- Mopala orma (Plötz, 1879)
- Gretna cylinda (Hewitson, 1876)
- Gretna lacida (Hewitson, 1876)
- Gretna waga (Plötz, 1886)
- Gretna zaremba (Plötz, 1884)
- Pteroteinon caenira (Hewitson, 1867)
- Pteroteinon capronnieri (Plötz, 1879)
- Pteroteinon ceucaenira (Druce, 1910)
- Pteroteinon concaenira Belcastro & Larsen, 1996
- Pteroteinon iricolor (Holland, 1890)
- Pteroteinon laterculus (Holland, 1890)
- Pteroteinon laufella (Hewitson, 1868)
- Pteroteinon pruna Evans, 1937
- Leona binoevatus (Mabille, 1891)
- Leona leonora (Plötz, 1879)
- Leona meloui (Riley, 1926)
- Caenides kangvensis Holland, 1896
- Caenides xychus (Mabille, 1891)
- Caenides benga (Holland, 1891)
- Caenides dacela (Hewitson, 1876)
- Caenides hidaroides Aurivillius, 1896
- Caenides dacena (Hewitson, 1876)
- Monza alberti (Holland, 1896)
- Monza cretacea (Snellen, 1872)
- Melphina malthina (Hewitson, 1876)
- Melphina statirides (Holland, 1896)
- Melphina tarace (Mabille, 1891)
- Melphina unistriga (Holland, 1893)
- Fresna carlo Evans, 1937
- Fresna cojo (Karsch, 1893)
- Fresna netopha (Hewitson, 1878)
- Platylesches affinissima Strand, 1921

==== Baorini ====
- Borbo binga (Evans, 1937)
- Borbo fallax (Gaede, 1916)
- Borbo holtzi (Plötz, 1883)
- Borbo perobscura (Druce, 1912)

== See also ==
- List of moths of the Republic of the Congo
- Congolian forests
- Forest-savanna mosaic
- Albertine Rift montane forests
- List of ecoregions in the Republic of the Congo
- Geography of the Republic of the Congo
