= Ornipholidotos nympha =

Scientific classification
- Kingdom: Animalia
- Phylum: Arthropoda
- Class: Insecta
- Order: Lepidoptera
- Family: Lycaenidae
- Genus: Ornipholidotos
- Species: O. nympha

Binomial name
- Ornipholidotos nympha Libert, 2000

Species of butterfly

Ornipholidotos nympha, the western fragile glasswing, is a butterfly in the family Lycaenidae. It is found in Ivory Coast, Ghana and southern Nigeria. Its habitat consists of forests.
