= Ornipholidotos irwini =

Scientific classification
- Kingdom: Animalia
- Phylum: Arthropoda
- Class: Insecta
- Order: Lepidoptera
- Family: Lycaenidae
- Genus: Ornipholidotos
- Species: O. irwini

Binomial name
- Ornipholidotos irwini Collins & Larsen, 1998

Species of butterfly

Ornipholidotos irwini, the Vane-Wright's glasswing, is a butterfly in the family Lycaenidae. It is found in Ghana, Cameroon and Gabon. The habitat consists of forests.
