= Ornipholidotos issia =

Scientific classification
- Kingdom: Animalia
- Phylum: Arthropoda
- Class: Insecta
- Order: Lepidoptera
- Family: Lycaenidae
- Genus: Ornipholidotos
- Species: O. issia

Binomial name
- Ornipholidotos issia Stempffer, 1969

Species of butterfly

Ornipholidotos issia, the Côte d'Ivoire glasswing, is a butterfly in the family Lycaenidae. It is found in Guinea, Sierra Leone, Ivory Coast and Ghana. The habitat consists of forests.
