= Ornipholidotos teroensis =

Scientific classification
- Kingdom: Animalia
- Phylum: Arthropoda
- Class: Insecta
- Order: Lepidoptera
- Family: Lycaenidae
- Genus: Ornipholidotos
- Species: O. teroensis

Binomial name
- Ornipholidotos teroensis Stempffer, 1957

Species of butterfly

Ornipholidotos teroensis is a butterfly in the family Lycaenidae. It is found in southern Uganda and north-western Tanzania. The habitat consists of forests.
