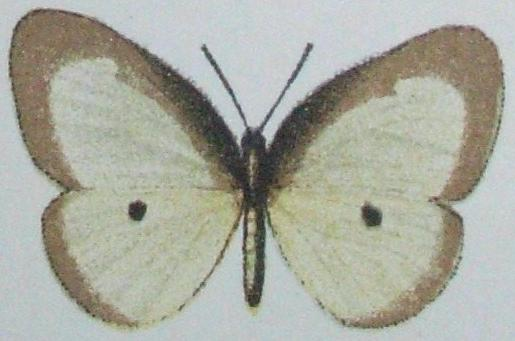

Scientific classification
- Kingdom: Animalia
- Phylum: Arthropoda
- Class: Insecta
- Order: Lepidoptera
- Family: Lycaenidae
- Genus: Ornipholidotos
- Species: O. muhata

Binomial name
- Ornipholidotos muhata (Dewitz, 1887)

Synonyms
- Pentila muhata Dewitz, 1887

= Ornipholidotos muhata =

Species of butterfly

Ornipholidotos muhata is a butterfly in the family Lycaenidae. It was described from the Democratic Republic of the Congo. The species is treated as a nomen dubium by Libert in 2005.
