= Ornipholidotos kivu =

Scientific classification
- Kingdom: Animalia
- Phylum: Arthropoda
- Class: Insecta
- Order: Lepidoptera
- Family: Lycaenidae
- Genus: Ornipholidotos
- Species: O. kivu

Binomial name
- Ornipholidotos kivu Collins & Larsen, 2000

Species of butterfly

Ornipholidotos kivu is a butterfly in the family Lycaenidae. It is found in Kivu in the Democratic Republic of the Congo. The habitat consists of forests.
