= Ornipholidotos latimargo =

Scientific classification
- Kingdom: Animalia
- Phylum: Arthropoda
- Class: Insecta
- Order: Lepidoptera
- Family: Lycaenidae
- Genus: Ornipholidotos
- Species: O. latimargo

Binomial name
- Ornipholidotos latimargo (Hawker-Smith, 1933)

Synonyms
- Pentila latimargo Hawker-Smith, 1933

Species of butterfly

Ornipholidotos latimargo is a butterfly in the family Lycaenidae. It is found in southern Sudan, south-western Uganda, the Democratic Republic of the Congo (the north-eastern and south-eastern parts of the country) and north-western Tanzania. The habitat consists of forests.

Adults mimic day-flying arctiid moths.
