= Ornipholidotos nguru =

Scientific classification
- Kingdom: Animalia
- Phylum: Arthropoda
- Class: Insecta
- Order: Lepidoptera
- Family: Lycaenidae
- Genus: Ornipholidotos
- Species: O. nguru

Binomial name
- Ornipholidotos nguru Kielland, 1987

Species of butterfly

Ornipholidotos nguru is a butterfly in the family Lycaenidae. It is found in Tanzania. The habitat consists of submontane evergreen forests.
