= Ornipholidotos gemina =

Scientific classification
- Kingdom: Animalia
- Phylum: Arthropoda
- Class: Insecta
- Order: Lepidoptera
- Family: Lycaenidae
- Genus: Ornipholidotos
- Species: O. gemina

Binomial name
- Ornipholidotos gemina Libert, 2000

Species of butterfly

Ornipholidotos gemina is a butterfly in the family Lycaenidae. It is found in Cameroon, the Central African Republic, the Democratic Republic of the Congo, Uganda and Tanzania. The habitat consists of forests.

== Subspecies ==
- Ornipholidotos gemina gemina (Cameroon, Democratic Republic of the Congo)
- Ornipholidotos gemina fournierae Libert, 2005 (Central African Republic, Democratic Republic of the Congo, Uganda, Tanzania)
