= Ornipholidotos evoei =

Scientific classification
- Kingdom: Animalia
- Phylum: Arthropoda
- Clade: Pancrustacea
- Class: Insecta
- Order: Lepidoptera
- Family: Lycaenidae
- Genus: Ornipholidotos
- Species: O. evoei

Binomial name
- Ornipholidotos evoei Libert, 2005

Species of butterfly

Ornipholidotos evoei is a butterfly in the family Lycaenidae. It is found in Cameroon, Equatorial Guinea and Gabon. The habitat consists of forests.
