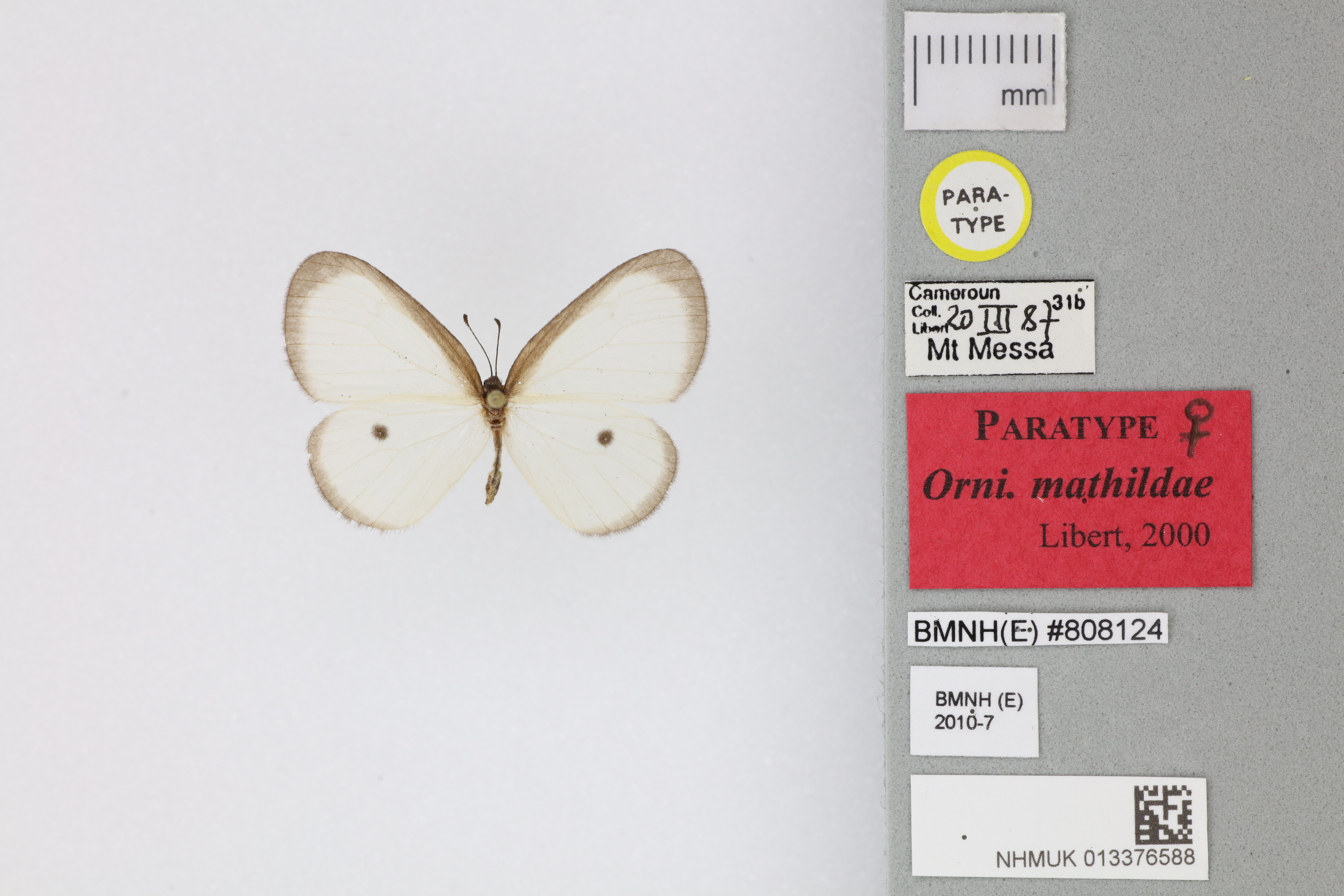

Scientific classification
- Kingdom: Animalia
- Phylum: Arthropoda
- Class: Insecta
- Order: Lepidoptera
- Family: Lycaenidae
- Genus: Ornipholidotos
- Species: O. mathildae

Binomial name
- Ornipholidotos mathildae Libert, 2000

= Ornipholidotos mathildae =

Species of butterfly

Ornipholidotos mathildae is a butterfly in the family Lycaenidae. It is found in Cameroon and the Central African Republic. The habitat consists of forests.

== Subspecies ==
- Ornipholidotos mathildae mathildae (Cameroon)
- Ornipholidotos mathildae uniformis Libert, 2005 (Central African Republic)
