= Ornipholidotos emarginata =

Scientific classification
- Kingdom: Animalia
- Phylum: Arthropoda
- Class: Insecta
- Order: Lepidoptera
- Family: Lycaenidae
- Genus: Ornipholidotos
- Species: O. emarginata

Binomial name
- Ornipholidotos emarginata (Hawker-Smith, 1933)

Synonyms
- Pentila emarginata Hawker-Smith, 1933

Species of butterfly

Ornipholidotos emarginata is a butterfly in the family Lycaenidae. It is found in the Democratic Republic of the Congo and Tanzania. The habitat consists of forests.

Adults have been recorded on wing in March, December and May.

== Subspecies ==
- Ornipholidotos emarginata emarginata (north-eastern Democratic Republic of the Congo)
- Ornipholidotos emarginata maxima Libert, 2005 (Tanzania)
