= Ornipholidotos ntebi =

Scientific classification
- Kingdom: Animalia
- Phylum: Arthropoda
- Class: Insecta
- Order: Lepidoptera
- Family: Lycaenidae
- Genus: Ornipholidotos
- Species: O. ntebi

Binomial name
- Ornipholidotos ntebi (Bethune-Baker, 1906)

Synonyms
- Pentila ntebi Bethune-Baker, 1906

Species of butterfly

Ornipholidotos ntebi is a butterfly in the family Lycaenidae. It is found in Uganda, western Kenya, north-western Tanzania and the north-eastern part of the Democratic Republic of the Congo. Their habitat consists of forests.

Adults mimic day-flying arctiid moths.

== Classification and synonyms ==
Ornipholidotos ntebi belongs to the kingdom Animalia, phylum Arthropoda, class Insecta, order Lepidoptera, family Lycaenidae, subfamily Poritiinae, and tribe Pentilini. The species was originally described as Pentila ntebi by Bethune-Baker in 1906, based on material from Uganda, and later transferred to the genus Ornipholidotos, established by the same author in 1914. Within the genus Ornipholidotos, which comprises 61 Afrotropical species, O. ntebi is placed in the O. ntebi species complex, alongside close relatives such as O. nbeti Libert, 2005; O. ducarmei Libert, 2005; and O. ghesquierei Libert, 2005. These taxa share morphological similarities and distributional overlaps in Central and East Africa, with some, like O. nbeti, initially treated as nomina dubia by d'Abrera (2009) but later restored to valid status by Collins et al. (2013). The genus underwent comprehensive taxonomic revision by Libert in 2005, which clarified species boundaries, synonymized several junior taxa, and designated neallotypes for many, including O. ntebi (neallotype female from Port Alice, Uganda, in the Natural History Museum, London). No junior synonyms are recognized for O. ntebi itself, though the original combination Pentila ntebi represents an outdated placement. O. ntebi is currently listed as valid in major Afrotropical checklists, including the 17th edition of Afrotropical Butterflies (Williams, 2018) and the African Butterfly Database
