= Ornipholidotos tessmani =

Scientific classification
- Kingdom: Animalia
- Phylum: Arthropoda
- Class: Insecta
- Order: Lepidoptera
- Family: Lycaenidae
- Genus: Ornipholidotos
- Species: O. tessmani

Binomial name
- Ornipholidotos tessmani Libert, 2005

Species of butterfly

Ornipholidotos tessmani is a butterfly in the family Lycaenidae. It is found on Bioko, an island 32 km off the west coast of Africa. The habitat consists of forests.
