= Ornipholidotos sylviae =

Scientific classification
- Kingdom: Animalia
- Phylum: Arthropoda
- Class: Insecta
- Order: Lepidoptera
- Family: Lycaenidae
- Genus: Ornipholidotos
- Species: O. sylviae

Binomial name
- Ornipholidotos sylviae Libert, 2005

Species of butterfly

Ornipholidotos sylviae is a butterfly in the family Lycaenidae. It is found in Ivory Coast and Ghana. The habitat consists of forests.
