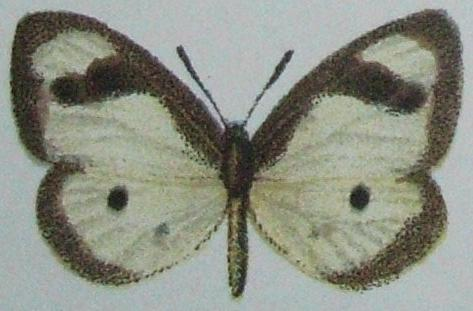

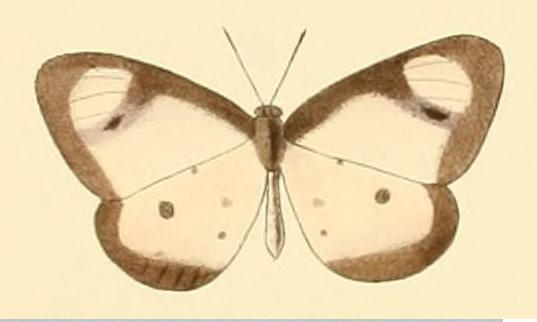

Scientific classification
- Kingdom: Animalia
- Phylum: Arthropoda
- Class: Insecta
- Order: Lepidoptera
- Family: Lycaenidae
- Genus: Ornipholidotos
- Species: O. peucetia

Binomial name
- Ornipholidotos peucetia (Hewitson, 1866)

Synonyms
- Pentila peucetia Hewitson, 1866; Larinopoda peuceda Grose-Smith, 1889; Pentila peucetia chyuluensis van Someren, 1939; Pentila peucetia orientalis Storace, 1947; Pentila peucetia penningtoni Riley, 1944

= Ornipholidotos peucetia =

Species of butterfly

Ornipholidotos peucetia, the large glasswing or white mimic, is a butterfly of the family Lycaenidae. It is found in southern and south-eastern Africa.

The wingspan is 35–37 mm for males and females. Adults are on wing from November to May with a peak in late summer. There is one generation per year.

The larvae feed on cyanobacteria species.

== Subspecies ==
- Ornipholidotos peucetia peucetia (south-western Uganda, Rwanda, Tanzania, Malawi, Zambia, Mozambique, eastern Zimbabwe, Democratic Republic of the Congo: Lualaba, Haut-Shaba)
- Ornipholidotos peucetia peuceda (Grose-Smith, 1889) (southern Somalia, Kenya, eastern Tanzania)
- Ornipholidotos peucetia penningtoni (Riley, 1944) (South Africa: KwaZulu-Natal to the north)
