= Ornipholidotos goodgerae =

Scientific classification
- Kingdom: Animalia
- Phylum: Arthropoda
- Class: Insecta
- Order: Lepidoptera
- Family: Lycaenidae
- Genus: Ornipholidotos
- Species: O. goodgerae

Binomial name
- Ornipholidotos goodgerae Libert, 2000

Species of butterfly

Ornipholidotos goodgerae is a butterfly in the family Lycaenidae. It is found in Cameroon. The habitat consists of forests.
