= Ornipholidotos abriana =

Scientific classification
- Kingdom: Animalia
- Phylum: Arthropoda
- Class: Insecta
- Order: Lepidoptera
- Family: Lycaenidae
- Genus: Ornipholidotos
- Species: O. abriana

Binomial name
- Ornipholidotos abriana Libert, 2005

Species of butterfly

Ornipholidotos abriana is a butterfly in the family Lycaenidae. It is found in the Central African Republic and the northern part of the Democratic Republic of the Congo. The habitat consists of forests.
