= Ornipholidotos nigeriae =

Scientific classification
- Kingdom: Animalia
- Phylum: Arthropoda
- Class: Insecta
- Order: Lepidoptera
- Family: Lycaenidae
- Genus: Ornipholidotos
- Species: O. nigeriae

Binomial name
- Ornipholidotos nigeriae Stempffer, 1964

Species of butterfly

Ornipholidotos nigeriae, the Nigerian glasswing, is a butterfly in the family Lycaenidae. It is found in southern Nigeria and south-western Cameroon. The habitat consists of forests.
