= Ornipholidotos tanganyikae =

Scientific classification
- Kingdom: Animalia
- Phylum: Arthropoda
- Class: Insecta
- Order: Lepidoptera
- Family: Lycaenidae
- Genus: Ornipholidotos
- Species: O. tanganyikae

Binomial name
- Ornipholidotos tanganyikae Kielland, 1983

Species of butterfly

Ornipholidotos tanganyikae is a butterfly in the family Lycaenidae. It is found in Tanzania (Kigoma and Mpanda). The habitat consists of riverine forests at altitudes between 900 and 1,300 metres.
