= Ornipholidotos ducarmei =

Scientific classification
- Kingdom: Animalia
- Phylum: Arthropoda
- Class: Insecta
- Order: Lepidoptera
- Family: Lycaenidae
- Genus: Ornipholidotos
- Species: O. ducarmei

Binomial name
- Ornipholidotos ducarmei Libert, 2005

Species of butterfly

Ornipholidotos ducarmei is a butterfly in the family Lycaenidae. It is found in the Democratic Republic of the Congo. The habitat consists of forests.
