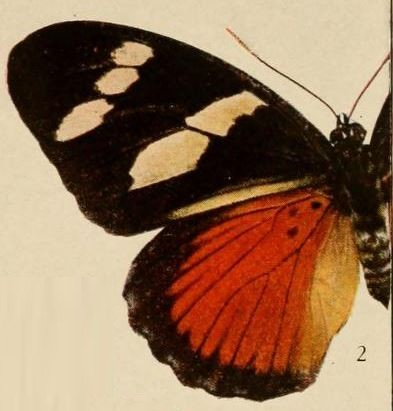

Scientific classification
- Kingdom: Animalia
- Phylum: Arthropoda
- Clade: Pancrustacea
- Class: Insecta
- Order: Lepidoptera
- Family: Nymphalidae
- Genus: Euphaedra
- Species: E. imitans

Binomial name
- Euphaedra imitans Holland, 1893

Synonyms
- Euphaedra (Radia) imitans; Euphaedra imitans var. interjecta Gaede, 1916

= Euphaedra imitans =

Species of butterfly

Euphaedra imitans, the equatorial mimic forester, is a butterfly in the family Nymphalidae. It is found in Nigeria, Cameroon, Gabon, the Republic of the Congo, the Democratic Republic of the Congo and western Uganda. The habitat consists of forests.

== Description ==
E. imitans Holl. is similar to E. eusemoides, but the median band of the forewing is less interrupted, the forewing has several small blue spots at the base and a long yellow stripe at the hindmargin and the hindwing has above 3 black dots in the cell and two blue submarginal dots in each cellule. Ogowe Valley; rare and little known; much resembles Xanthospilopteryx longipennis Wkr.

It is a member of the Euphaedra eusemoides species group
