= Ornipholidotos kelle =

Scientific classification
- Kingdom: Animalia
- Phylum: Arthropoda
- Class: Insecta
- Order: Lepidoptera
- Family: Lycaenidae
- Genus: Ornipholidotos
- Species: O. kelle

Binomial name
- Ornipholidotos kelle Stempffer, 1967

Species of butterfly

Ornipholidotos kelle is a butterfly in the family Lycaenidae. It is found in Cameroon and the Republic of the Congo. The habitat consists of forests.
