= Ornipholidotos jax =

Scientific classification
- Kingdom: Animalia
- Phylum: Arthropoda
- Class: Insecta
- Order: Lepidoptera
- Family: Lycaenidae
- Genus: Ornipholidotos
- Species: O. jax

Binomial name
- Ornipholidotos jax Collins & Larsen, 1998

Species of butterfly

Ornipholidotos jax is a butterfly in the family Lycaenidae. It is found in the Central African Republic. The habitat consists of forests.
