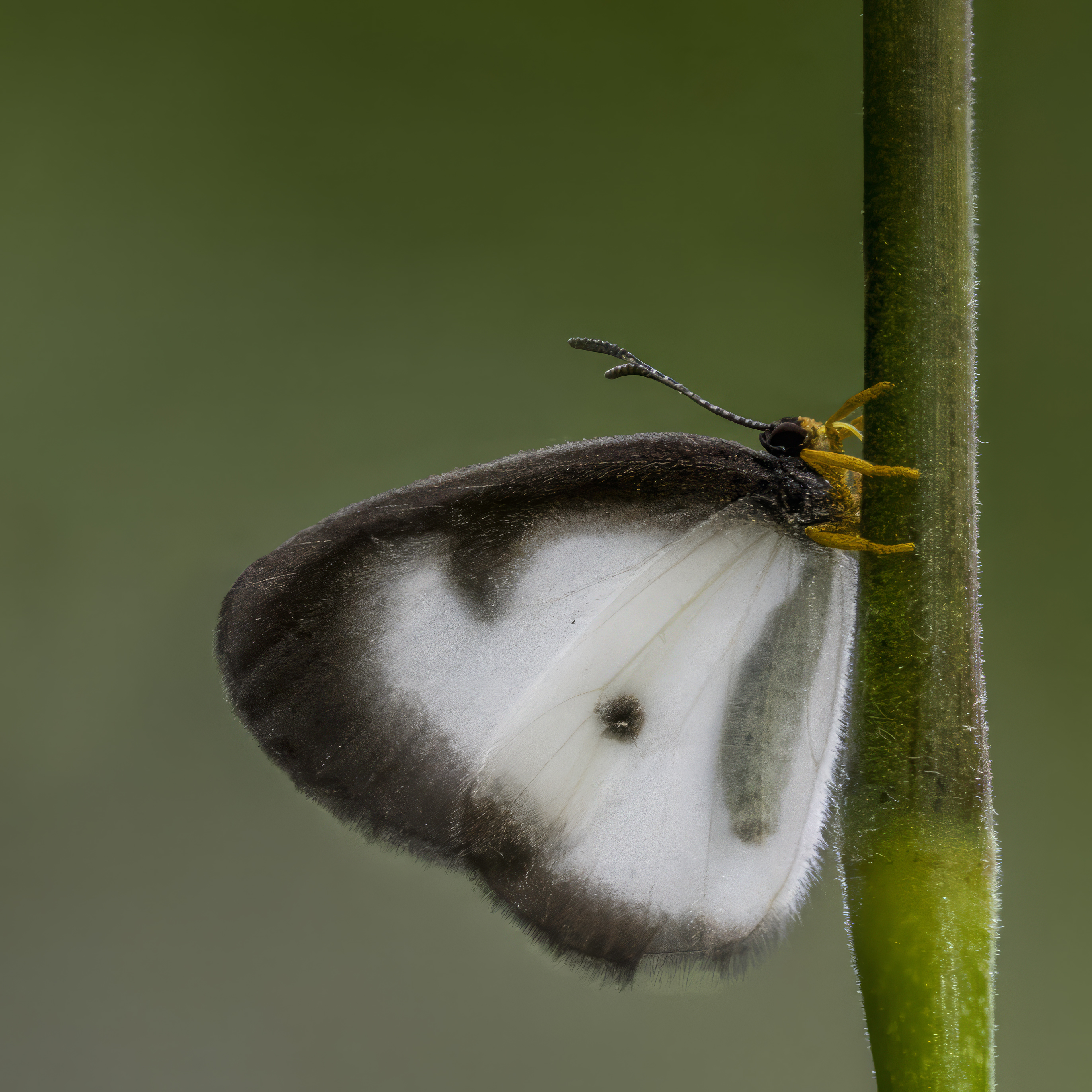
- O. tiassale in Ghana

Scientific classification
- Kingdom: Animalia
- Phylum: Arthropoda
- Class: Insecta
- Order: Lepidoptera
- Family: Lycaenidae
- Subfamily: Poritiinae
- Tribe: Liptenini
- Genus: Ornipholidotos; Bethune-Baker, 1914

= Ornipholidotos =

Butterfly genus in family Lycaenidae

Ornipholidotos is a genus of butterflies, commonly called glasswings or white mimics, in the family Lycaenidae. The species of this genus are endemic to the Afrotropical realm.

== Species ==
- Ornipholidotos abriana Libert, 2005
- Ornipholidotos ackeryi Libert, 2000
- Ornipholidotos amieti Libert, 2005
- Ornipholidotos annae Libert, 2005
- Ornipholidotos aureliae Libert, 2005
- Ornipholidotos ayissii Libert, 2005
- Ornipholidotos bakotae Stempffer, 1962
- Ornipholidotos bitjeensis Stempffer, 1957
- Ornipholidotos boormani Libert, 2005
- Ornipholidotos carolinae Libert, 2005
- Ornipholidotos congoensis Stempffer, 1964
- Ornipholidotos dargei Libert, 2000
- Ornipholidotos dowsetti Collins & Larsen, 2000
- Ornipholidotos ducarmei Libert, 2005
- Ornipholidotos emarginata (Hawker-Smith, 1933)
- Ornipholidotos etoumbi Stempffer, 1967
- Ornipholidotos evoei Libert, 2005
- Ornipholidotos francisci Libert, 2005
- Ornipholidotos gabonensis Stempffer, 1947
- Ornipholidotos gemina Libert, 2000
- Ornipholidotos ghesquierei Libert, 2005
- Ornipholidotos ginettae Libert, 2005
- Ornipholidotos goodgerae Libert, 2000
- Ornipholidotos henrii Libert, 2000
- Ornipholidotos irwini Collins & Larsen, 1998
- Ornipholidotos issia Stempffer, 1969
- Ornipholidotos ivoiriensis Libert, 2005
- Ornipholidotos jacksoni Stempffer, 1961
- Ornipholidotos jax Collins & Larsen, 1998
- Ornipholidotos jolyana Libert, 2005
- Ornipholidotos josianae Libert, 2005
- Ornipholidotos katangae Stempffer, 1947
- Ornipholidotos kelle Stempffer, 1967
- Ornipholidotos kennedyi Libert, 2005
- Ornipholidotos kirbyi (Aurivillius, 1895)
- Ornipholidotos kivu Collins & Larsen, 2000
- Ornipholidotos latimargo (Hawker-Smith, 1933)
- Ornipholidotos likouala Stempffer, 1969
- Ornipholidotos maesseni Libert, 2005
- Ornipholidotos mathildae Libert, 2000
- Ornipholidotos michelae Libert, 2000
- Ornipholidotos muhata (Dewitz, 1886)
- Ornipholidotos nancy Collins & Larsen, 2000
- Ornipholidotos nbeti Libert, 2005
- Ornipholidotos nguru Kielland, 1987
- Ornipholidotos nigeriae Stempffer, 1964
- Ornipholidotos ntebi (Bethune-Baker, 1906)
- Ornipholidotos nympha Libert, 2000
- Ornipholidotos onitshae Stempffer, 1962
- Ornipholidotos oremansi Libert, 2005
- Ornipholidotos overlaeti Stempffer, 1947 – Overlaet's glasswing
- Ornipholidotos paradoxa (Druce, 1910)
- Ornipholidotos perfragilis (Holland, 1890)
- Ornipholidotos peucetia (Hewitson, 1866) – large glasswing, white mimic
- Ornipholidotos sylpha (Kirby, 1890)
- Ornipholidotos sylphida (Staudinger, 1892)
- Ornipholidotos sylviae Libert, 2005
- Ornipholidotos tanganyikae Kielland, 1983
- Ornipholidotos teroensis Stempffer, 1957
- Ornipholidotos tessmani Libert, 2005
- Ornipholidotos tiassale Stempffer, 1969
- Ornipholidotos tirza (Hewitson, 1873)
- Ornipholidotos ugandae Stempffer, 1947
