= Ornipholidotos onitshae =

Scientific classification
- Kingdom: Animalia
- Phylum: Arthropoda
- Class: Insecta
- Order: Lepidoptera
- Family: Lycaenidae
- Genus: Ornipholidotos
- Species: O. onitshae

Binomial name
- Ornipholidotos onitshae Stempffer, 1962

Species of butterfly

Ornipholidotos onitshae, the Onitsha glasswing, is a butterfly in the family Lycaenidae. It is found in Sierra Leone, Ivory Coast, Ghana, southern Nigeria and western Cameroon. The habitat consists of forests.
