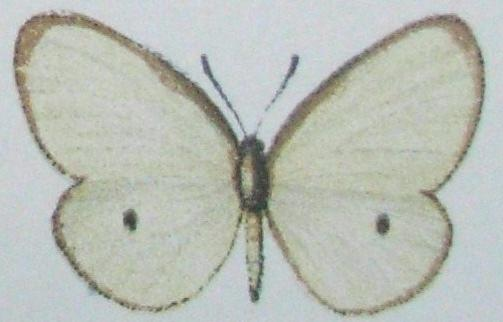

Scientific classification
- Kingdom: Animalia
- Phylum: Arthropoda
- Class: Insecta
- Order: Lepidoptera
- Family: Lycaenidae
- Genus: Ornipholidotos
- Species: O. sylphida

Binomial name
- Ornipholidotos sylphida (Staudinger, 1892)

Synonyms
- Larinopoda sylphida Staudinger, 1892

= Ornipholidotos sylphida =

Species of butterfly

Ornipholidotos sylphida is a butterfly in the family Lycaenidae. It is found in Cameroon, Gabon and Angola. The habitat consists of forests.
