= Ornipholidotos ivoiriensis =

Scientific classification
- Kingdom: Animalia
- Phylum: Arthropoda
- Class: Insecta
- Order: Lepidoptera
- Family: Lycaenidae
- Genus: Ornipholidotos
- Species: O. ivoiriensis

Binomial name
- Ornipholidotos ivoiriensis Libert, 2005

Species of butterfly

Ornipholidotos ivoiriensis is a butterfly in the family Lycaenidae. It is found in southern Ivory Coast. The habitat consists of forests.
