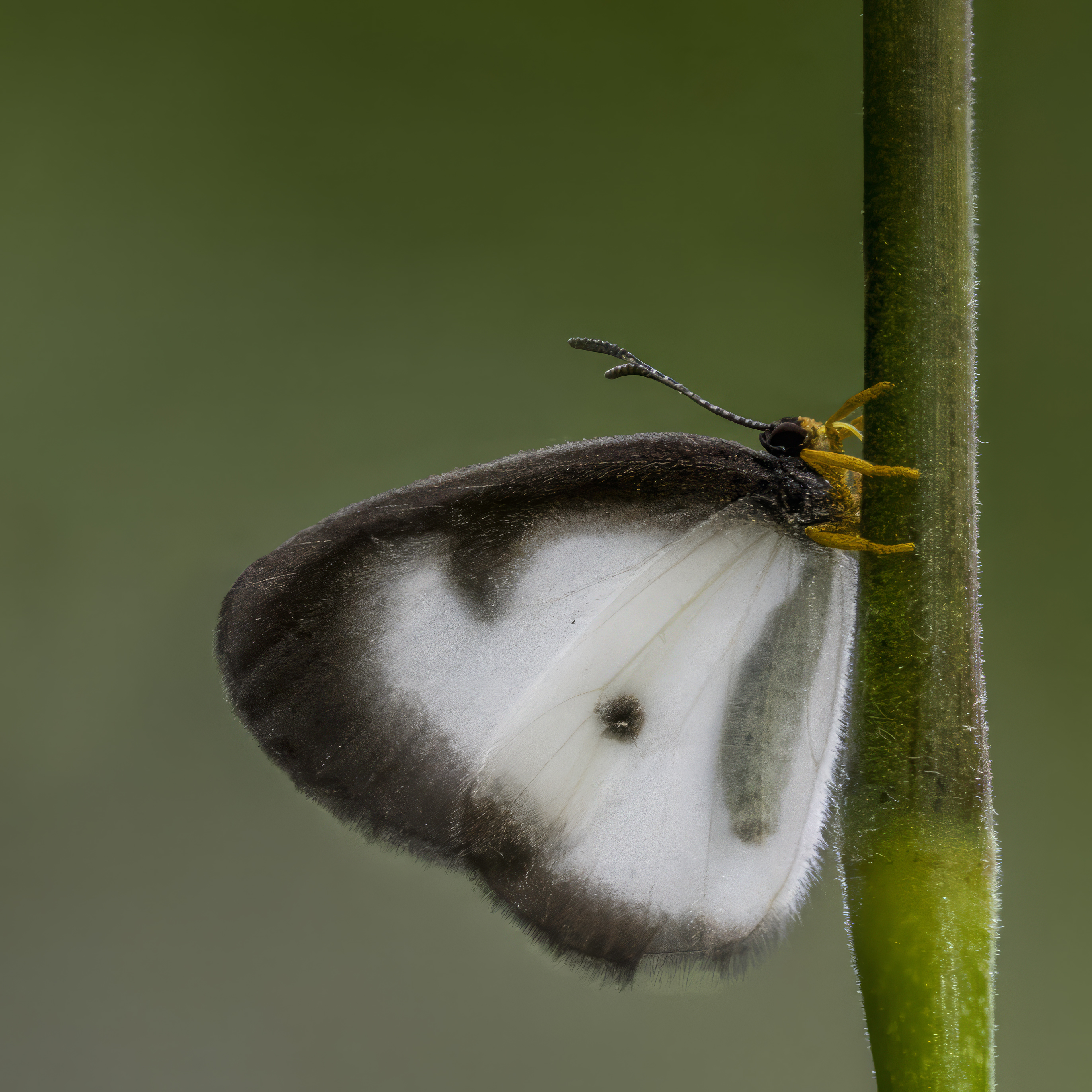
- in Ghana

Scientific classification
- Kingdom: Animalia
- Phylum: Arthropoda
- Clade: Pancrustacea
- Class: Insecta
- Order: Lepidoptera
- Family: Lycaenidae
- Genus: Ornipholidotos
- Species: O. tiassale

Binomial name
- Ornipholidotos tiassale Stempffer, 1969

= Ornipholidotos tiassale =

Species of butterfly

Ornipholidotos tiassale, the western glasswing, is a butterfly in the family Lycaenidae. It is found in Sierra Leone, Liberia, Ivory Coast and Ghana.

Adults feed on extrafloral nectaries on Marantaceae species.

Torben Larsen developed a species numbering system for his 2005 publication Butterflies of West Africa. This species is #174. The 'Larsen' numbers have since been used with permission in A Sharp Eye on Butterflies of Ghana.
