= Ornipholidotos kennedyi =

Scientific classification
- Kingdom: Animalia
- Phylum: Arthropoda
- Class: Insecta
- Order: Lepidoptera
- Family: Lycaenidae
- Genus: Ornipholidotos
- Species: O. kennedyi

Binomial name
- Ornipholidotos kennedyi Libert, 2005

Species of butterfly

Ornipholidotos kennedyi is a butterfly in the family Lycaenidae. It is found in Cameroon. Its habitat consists of forests.
