= Ornipholidotos ginettae =

Scientific classification
- Kingdom: Animalia
- Phylum: Arthropoda
- Class: Insecta
- Order: Lepidoptera
- Family: Lycaenidae
- Genus: Ornipholidotos
- Species: O. ginettae

Binomial name
- Ornipholidotos ginettae Libert, 2005

Species of butterfly

Ornipholidotos ginettae is a butterfly in the family Lycaenidae. It is found in the north-eastern part of the Democratic Republic of the Congo. The habitat consists of forests.
