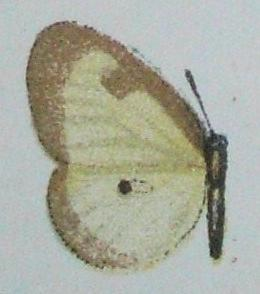

Scientific classification
- Kingdom: Animalia
- Phylum: Arthropoda
- Clade: Pancrustacea
- Class: Insecta
- Order: Lepidoptera
- Family: Lycaenidae
- Genus: Ornipholidotos
- Species: O. kirbyi

Binomial name
- Ornipholidotos kirbyi (Aurivillius, 1895)

Synonyms
- Pentila kirbyi Aurivillius, 1895; Pentila kirbyi ab. fumosa Schultze, 1923; Ornipholidotos camerunensis Stempffer, 1964

= Ornipholidotos kirbyi =

Species of butterfly

Ornipholidotos kirbyi is a butterfly in the family Lycaenidae. It is found in Nigeria, Cameroon, Equatorial Guinea, Gabon and the Republic of the Congo. The habitat consists of dense forests.
