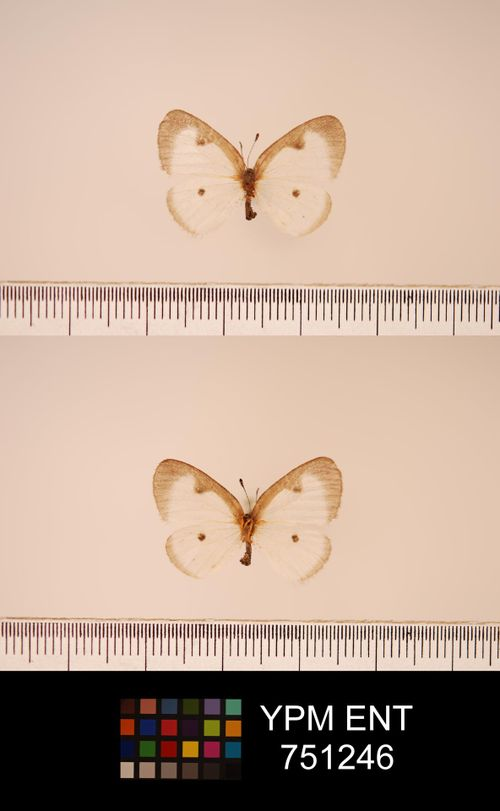

Scientific classification
- Kingdom: Animalia
- Phylum: Arthropoda
- Class: Insecta
- Order: Lepidoptera
- Family: Lycaenidae
- Genus: Ornipholidotos
- Species: O. ugandae

Binomial name
- Ornipholidotos ugandae Stempffer, 1947

= Ornipholidotos ugandae =

Species of butterfly

Ornipholidotos ugandae is a butterfly in the family Lycaenidae. It is found in Cameroon, Equatorial Guinea, the Republic of the Congo, Gabon, Angola, the Central African Republic, the Democratic Republic of the Congo, Uganda and Tanzania. The habitat consists of forests.

== Subspecies ==
- Ornipholidotos ugandae ugandae (north-eastern Democratic Republic of the Congo, Uganda, north-western Tanzania)
- Ornipholidotos ugandae biokoensis Libert, 2005 (Equatorial Guinea)
- Ornipholidotos ugandae goodi Libert, 2000 (Cameroon, Congo, Gabon, Angola, Central African Republic, Democratic Republic of the Congo)
