= Ornipholidotos nancy =

Scientific classification
- Kingdom: Animalia
- Phylum: Arthropoda
- Class: Insecta
- Order: Lepidoptera
- Family: Lycaenidae
- Genus: Ornipholidotos
- Species: O. nancy

Binomial name
- Ornipholidotos nancy Collins & Larsen, 2000

Species of butterfly

Ornipholidotos nancy is a butterfly in the family Lycaenidae. It is found in the Republic of the Congo where it mainly resides in forests.

Adults have been recorded on wing in October and January.
