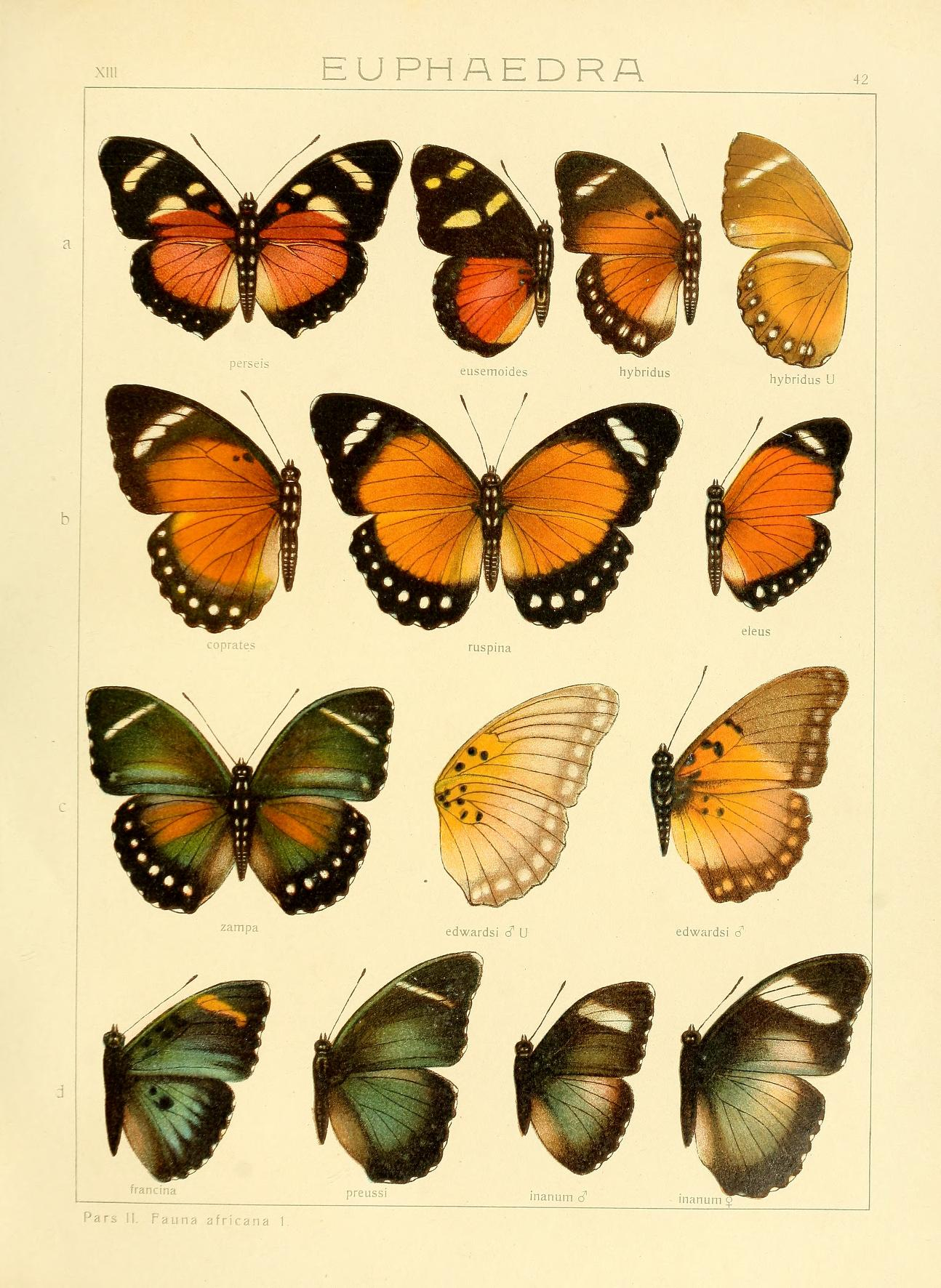
- In Adalbert Seitz's Fauna Africana

Scientific classification
- Kingdom: Animalia
- Phylum: Arthropoda
- Class: Insecta
- Order: Lepidoptera
- Family: Nymphalidae
- Genus: Euphaedra
- Species: E. eusemoides

Binomial name
- Euphaedra eusemoides (Grose-Smith & Kirby 1889)

Synonyms
- Euryphene eusemoides Grose-Smith & Kirby, 1889; Euphaedra (Radia) eusemoides; Euphaedra eusemioides var. coeruleopunctata Gaede, 1916

= Euphaedra eusemoides =

Species of butterfly

Euphaedra eusemoides, the western mimic forester, is a butterfly in the family Nymphalidae. It is found in Guinea, Sierra Leone, Liberia, Ivory Coast and Ghana.

== Description ==
E. eusemoides Sm. & Kirby (42 a). Forewing above without hindmarginal spot, the median band consisting of only two separated spots (in the cell and in cellule 2); the marginal band of the hindwing on both surfaces unspotted; the cell of the forewing beneath red at the base, both with 3 black dots; hindwing beneath spotted with light yellow in the middle (in cellules 4 and 5). Congo.

== Biology ==
The habitat consists of wet forests.

Adults are attracted to fallen fruit. They mimic day-flying Agaristinae and Lasiocampidae moths.

== Taxonomy ==
It is the nominal member of the Euphaedra eusemoides species group.
