= Ornipholidotos annae =

Scientific classification
- Kingdom: Animalia
- Phylum: Arthropoda
- Class: Insecta
- Order: Lepidoptera
- Family: Lycaenidae
- Genus: Ornipholidotos
- Species: O. annae

Binomial name
- Ornipholidotos annae Libert, 2005

Species of butterfly

Ornipholidotos annae is a butterfly in the family Lycaenidae. It is found in Cameroon, Equatorial Guinea, the Republic of the Congo, Gabon and the Democratic Republic of the Congo. The habitat consists of forests.
