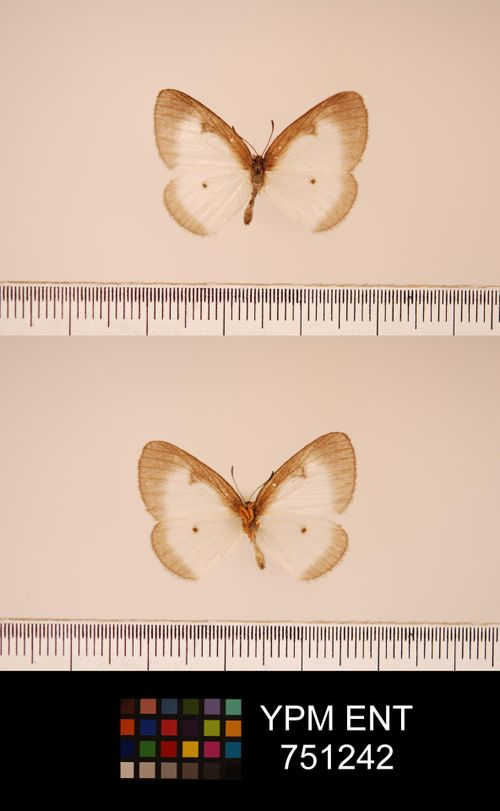

Scientific classification
- Kingdom: Animalia
- Phylum: Arthropoda
- Class: Insecta
- Order: Lepidoptera
- Family: Lycaenidae
- Genus: Ornipholidotos
- Species: O. overlaeti

Binomial name
- Ornipholidotos overlaeti Stempffer, 1947

= Ornipholidotos overlaeti =

Species of butterfly

Ornipholidotos overlaeti, the Overlaet's glasswing, is a butterfly in the family Lycaenidae. It is found in Cameroon, Gabon, the Republic of the Congo, the Central African Republic, the Democratic Republic of the Congo, Sudan, Uganda, Tanzania and Zambia. The habitat consists of lowland riverine forests.

== Subspecies ==
- Ornipholidotos overlaeti overlaeti (Democratic Republic of the Congo, Zambia: Mwinilinga district)
- Ornipholidotos overlaeti fontainei Libert, 2005 (Cameroon, Gabon, Congo, Central African Republic, Democratic Republic of the Congo)
- Ornipholidotos overlaeti intermedia Libert, 2005 (Sudan, Uganda, north-western Tanzania)
