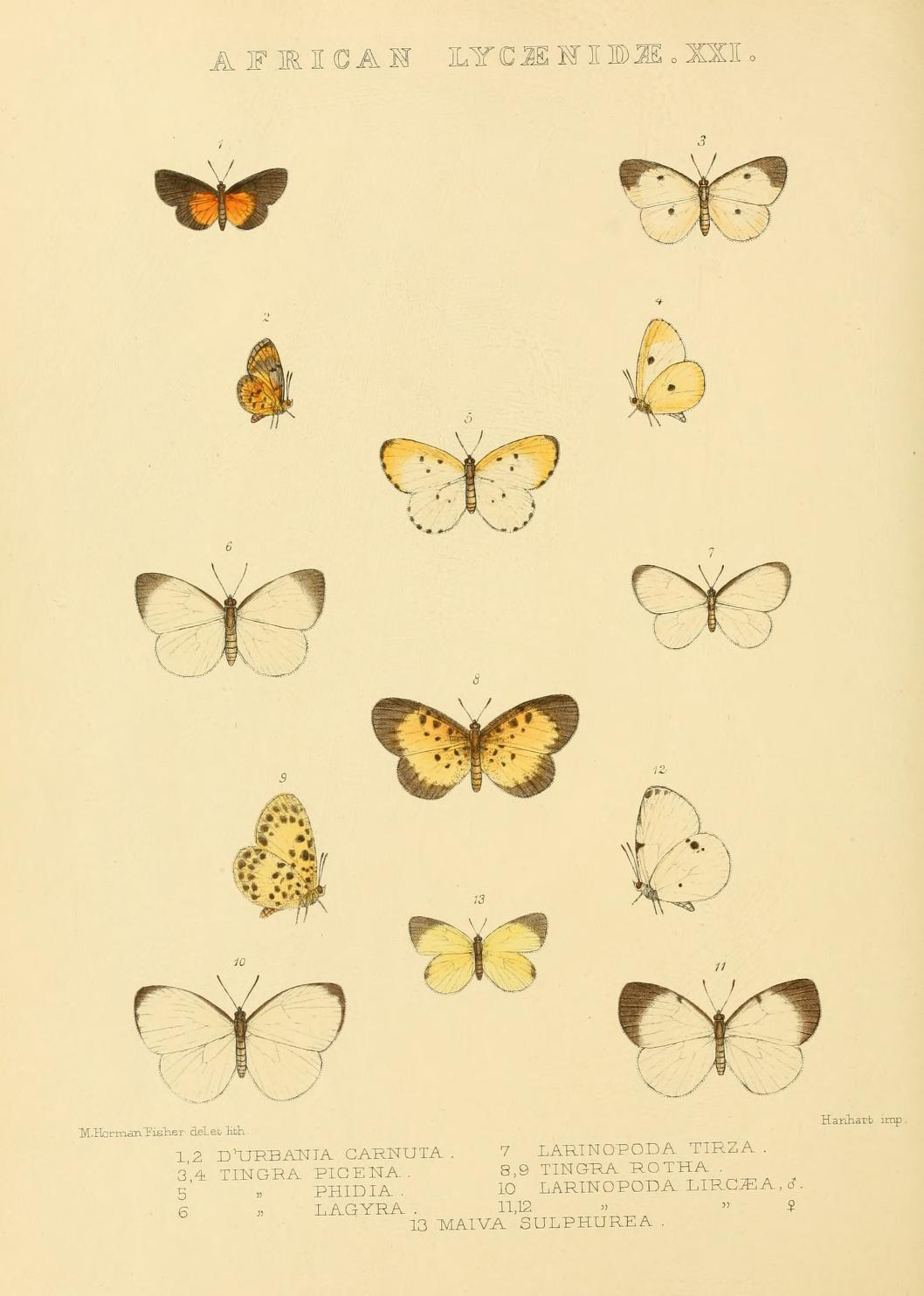
- Figure 7

Scientific classification
- Kingdom: Animalia
- Phylum: Arthropoda
- Class: Insecta
- Order: Lepidoptera
- Family: Lycaenidae
- Genus: Ornipholidotos
- Species: O. tirza

Binomial name
- Ornipholidotos tirza (Hewitson, 1873)

Synonyms
- Pentila tirza Hewitson, 1873

= Ornipholidotos tirza =

Species of butterfly

Ornipholidotos tirza is a butterfly in the family Lycaenidae. It is found in Cameroon, the Republic of the Congo and Gabon. The habitat consists of forests.
