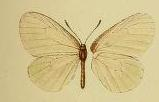

Scientific classification
- Kingdom: Animalia
- Phylum: Arthropoda
- Class: Insecta
- Order: Lepidoptera
- Family: Lycaenidae
- Genus: Ornipholidotos
- Species: O. paradoxa

Binomial name
- Ornipholidotos paradoxa (H. H. Druce, 1910)

Synonyms
- Pentila paradoxa H. H. Druce, 1910

= Ornipholidotos paradoxa =

Species of butterfly

Ornipholidotos paradoxa is a butterfly in the family Lycaenidae first described by Hamilton Herbert Druce in 1910. It is found in Cameroon, the Republic of the Congo, the Central African Republic, the Democratic Republic of the Congo, Uganda and Tanzania.

== Subspecies ==
- Ornipholidotos paradoxa paradoxa (Cameroon, Congo)
- Ornipholidotos paradoxa centralis Libert, 2005 (Central African Republic, Democratic Republic of the Congo)
- Ornipholidotos paradoxa orientis Libert, 2005 (north-eastern Democratic Republic of the Congo, Uganda, north-western Tanzania)
