= Ornipholidotos congoensis =

Scientific classification
- Kingdom: Animalia
- Phylum: Arthropoda
- Class: Insecta
- Order: Lepidoptera
- Family: Lycaenidae
- Genus: Ornipholidotos
- Species: O. congoensis

Binomial name
- Ornipholidotos congoensis Stempffer, 1964

Species of butterfly

Ornipholidotos congoensis is a butterfly in the family Lycaenidae. It is found in Cameroon, Gabon, the Republic of the Congo, the Central African Republic and the Democratic Republic of the Congo. The habitat consists of forests.
