= Liptena ouesso =

Scientific classification
- Kingdom: Animalia
- Phylum: Arthropoda
- Class: Insecta
- Order: Lepidoptera
- Family: Lycaenidae
- Genus: Liptena
- Species: L. ouesso

Binomial name
- Liptena ouesso Stempffer, Bennett & May, 1974

Species of butterfly

Liptena ouesso is a butterfly in the family Lycaenidae. It is found in Cameroon and the Republic of the Congo.

== Subspecies ==
- Liptena ouesso ouesso (Cameroon, Congo)
- Liptena ouesso mayombe Stempffer, Bennett & May, 1974 (Congo: Brazzaville)
