= Ornipholidotos amieti =

Scientific classification
- Kingdom: Animalia
- Phylum: Arthropoda
- Class: Insecta
- Order: Lepidoptera
- Family: Lycaenidae
- Genus: Ornipholidotos
- Species: O. amieti

Binomial name
- Ornipholidotos amieti Libert, 2005

Species of butterfly

Ornipholidotos amieti is a butterfly in the family Lycaenidae. It is found in Cameroon, the Republic of the Congo, the Central African Republic, the Democratic Republic of the Congo, Uganda, Kenya and Tanzania. The habitat consists of forests.

== Subspecies ==
- Ornipholidotos amieti amieti (Cameroon, Congo, Central African Republic, Democratic Republic of the Congo)
- Ornipholidotos amieti angulata Libert, 2005 (Democratic Republic of the Congo, Uganda, western Kenya, north-western Tanzania)
