= Ornipholidotos gabonensis =

Scientific classification
- Kingdom: Animalia
- Phylum: Arthropoda
- Class: Insecta
- Order: Lepidoptera
- Family: Lycaenidae
- Genus: Ornipholidotos
- Species: O. gabonensis

Binomial name
- Ornipholidotos gabonensis Stempffer, 1947

Species of butterfly

Ornipholidotos gabonensis is a butterfly in the family Lycaenidae. It is found in Gabon, the Republic of the Congo, the Democratic Republic of the Congo and Angola. The habitat consists of forests.
