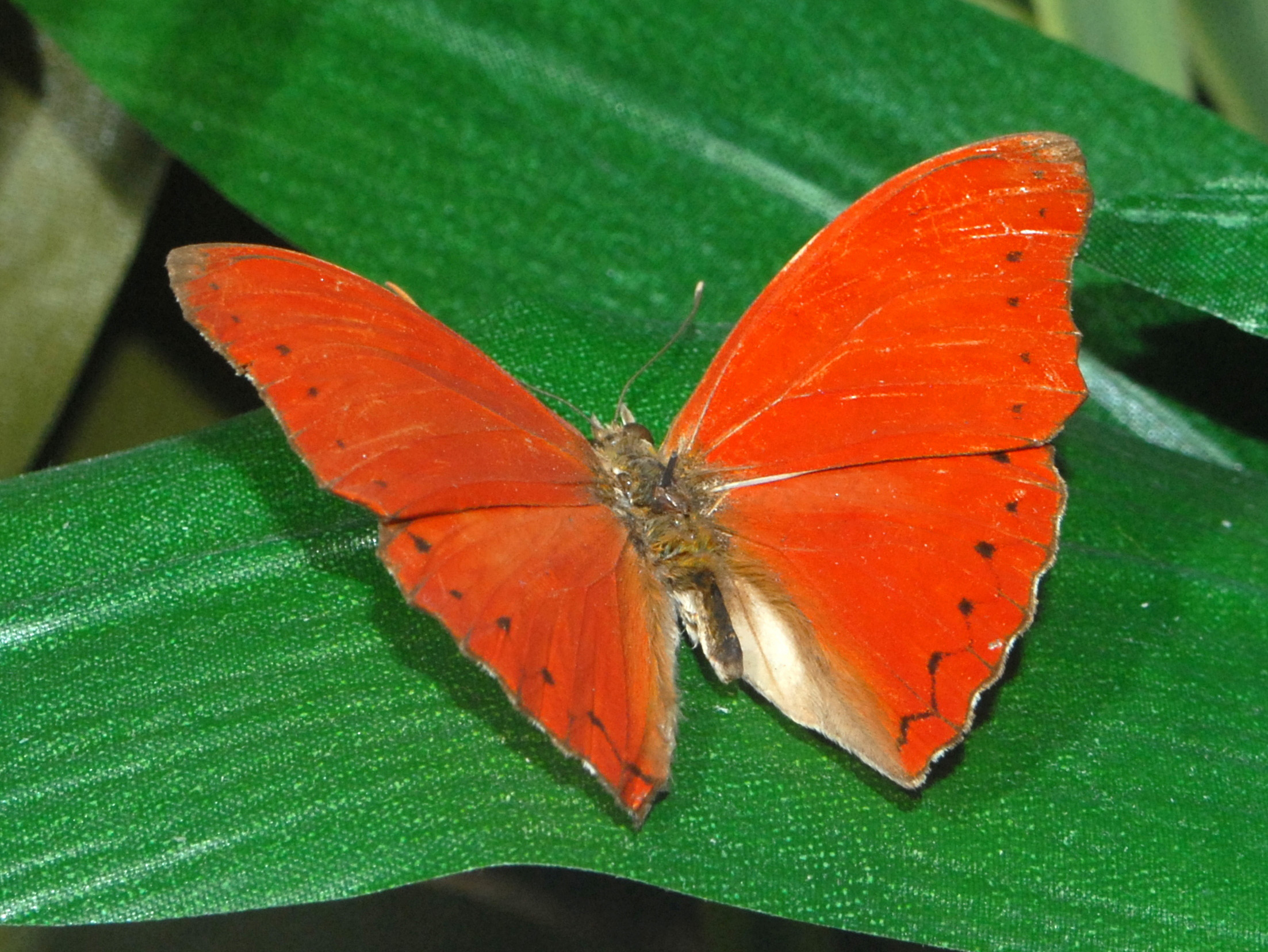
- Dorsal view, at the Museo Civico di Storia Naturale di Milano

Scientific classification
- Kingdom: Animalia
- Phylum: Arthropoda
- Clade: Pancrustacea
- Class: Insecta
- Order: Lepidoptera
- Family: Nymphalidae
- Genus: Cymothoe
- Species: C. aramis

Binomial name
- Cymothoe aramis (Hewitson, 1865)

Synonyms
- Euryphene aramis Hewitson, 1865; Cymothoe aramis f. excelsior Hall, 1917; Cymothoe aramis f. schoutedeni Overlaet, 1945; Cymothoe aramis f. carradoti Overlaet, 1944

= Cymothoe aramis =

Species of butterfly

Cymothoe aramis, the orange-red glider, is a butterfly in the family Nymphalidae. It is found in Nigeria, Cameroon, the Republic of the Congo, Gabon, the Central African Republic and the Democratic Republic of the Congo. The habitat consists of forests.

The larvae feed on Rinorea dentata.

== Subspecies ==
- Cymothoe aramis aramis (Nigeria: Cross River loop, Cameroon, Congo, Gabon, Central African Republic)
- Cymothoe aramis schoutedeni Overlaet, 1952 (Congo, Democratic Republic of the Congo: Ubangi, Mongala, Uele, north Kivu)

== Gallery ==
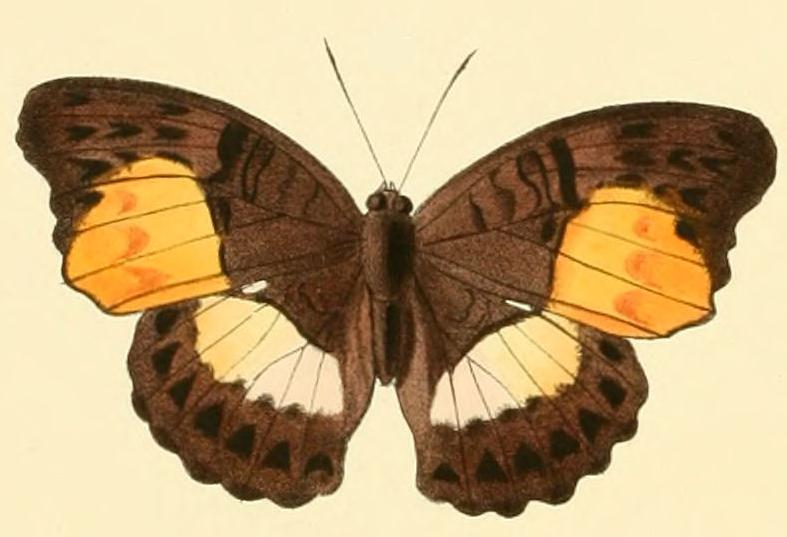
Dorsal view from Illustrations of New Species of Exotic Butterflies volume III (1856)

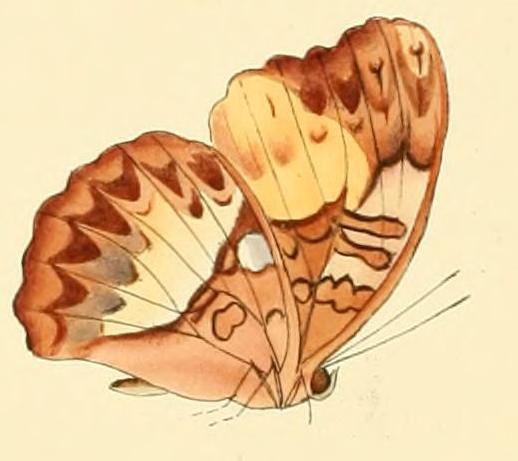
Ventral view
