= Ornipholidotos dowsetti =

Scientific classification
- Kingdom: Animalia
- Phylum: Arthropoda
- Class: Insecta
- Order: Lepidoptera
- Family: Lycaenidae
- Genus: Ornipholidotos
- Species: O. dowsetti

Binomial name
- Ornipholidotos dowsetti Collins & Larsen, 2000

Species of butterfly

Ornipholidotos dowsetti is a butterfly in the family Lycaenidae. It is found in the Republic of the Congo. The habitat consists of forests.

Adults have been recorded on wing in February.
