= Ornipholidotos perfragilis =

Scientific classification
- Kingdom: Animalia
- Phylum: Arthropoda
- Class: Insecta
- Order: Lepidoptera
- Family: Lycaenidae
- Genus: Ornipholidotos
- Species: O. perfragilis

Binomial name
- Ornipholidotos perfragilis (Holland, 1890)

Synonyms
- Larinopoda perfragilis Holland, 1890

Species of butterfly

Ornipholidotos perfragilis is a butterfly in the family Lycaenidae. It is found in southern Cameroon, Equatorial Guinea, Gabon and the Republic of the Congo. The habitat consists of forests.
