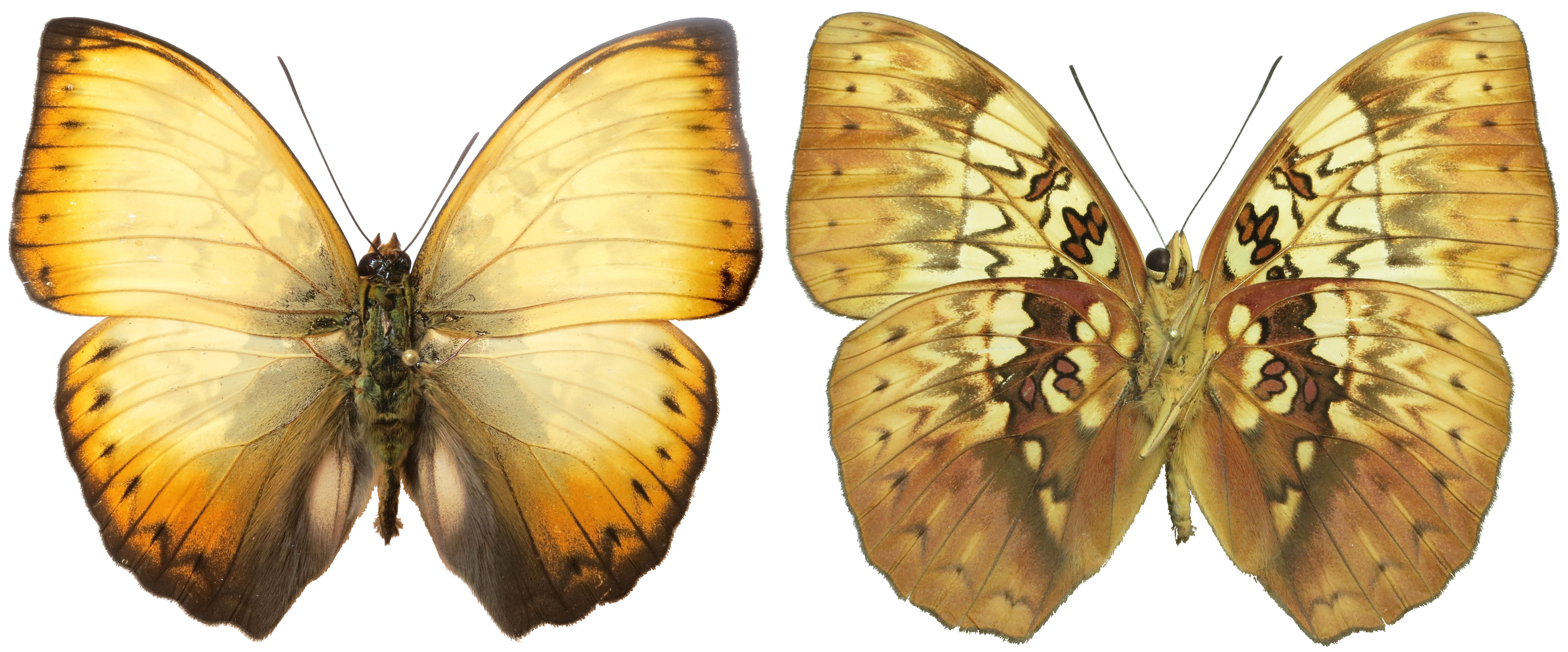
- male (dorsal and ventral) - Cameroon

Scientific classification
- Kingdom: Animalia
- Phylum: Arthropoda
- Class: Insecta
- Order: Lepidoptera
- Family: Nymphalidae
- Genus: Cymothoe
- Species: C. hyarbita

Binomial name
- Cymothoe hyarbita (Hewitson, 1866)

Synonyms
- Harma hyarbita Hewitson, 1866; Paradiadema hora Distant, 1880; Aterica buchholzi Plötz, 1880; Cymothoe electrinos Birket-Smith, 1960

= Cymothoe hyarbita =

Creamy yellow glider

Species of butterfly

Cymothoe hyarbita, the creamy yellow glider, is a butterfly in the family Nymphalidae. It is found in Nigeria, Cameroon, the Republic of the Congo and the Democratic Republic of the Congo.

The larvae feed on Dichapetalum and Caloncoba species.

== Subspecies ==
- Cymothoe hyarbita hyarbita (eastern Nigeria, Cameroon, western Congo)
- Cymothoe hyarbita hyarbitina Aurivillius, 1897 (eastern Congo, Democratic Republic of the Congo)

== Gallery ==
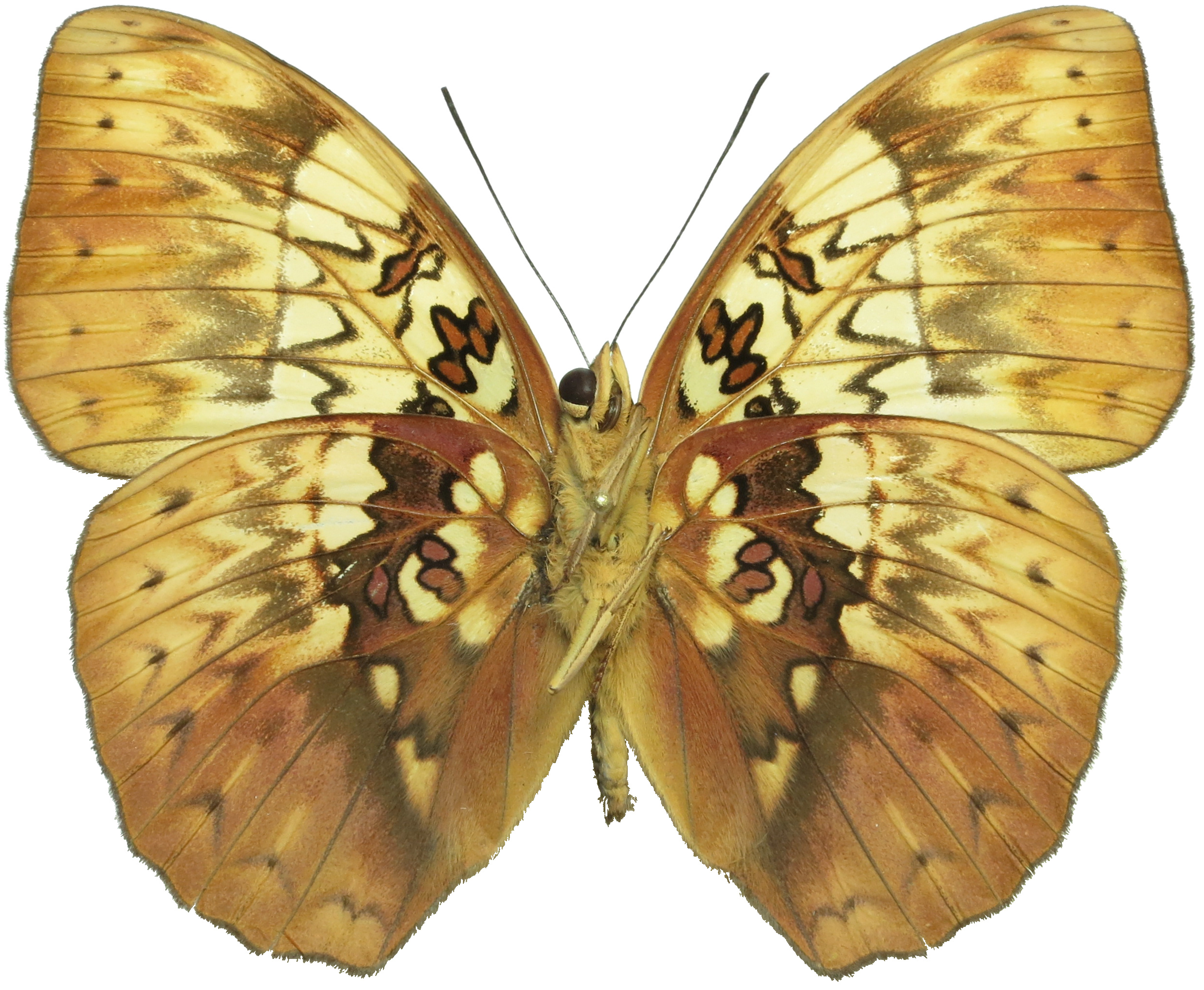
C. hyarbita hyarbita ventral side
