= Ornipholidotos katangae =

Scientific classification
- Kingdom: Animalia
- Phylum: Arthropoda
- Class: Insecta
- Order: Lepidoptera
- Family: Lycaenidae
- Genus: Ornipholidotos
- Species: O. katangae

Binomial name
- Ornipholidotos katangae Stempffer, 1947

Species of butterfly

Ornipholidotos katangae is a butterfly in the family Lycaenidae. It is found in the Democratic Republic of the Congo, Uganda, Kenya, Tanzania and Zambia. The habitat consists of forests.

== Subspecies ==
- Ornipholidotos katangae katangae (Democratic Republic of the Congo, north-western Zambia)
- Ornipholidotos katangae reducta Libert, 2005 (northern and north-eastern Democratic Republic of the Congo, Uganda, western Kenya, north-western Tanzania)
