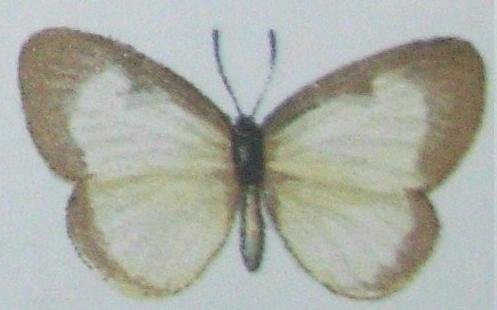

Scientific classification
- Kingdom: Animalia
- Phylum: Arthropoda
- Class: Insecta
- Order: Lepidoptera
- Family: Lycaenidae
- Genus: Ornipholidotos
- Species: O. sylpha

Binomial name
- Ornipholidotos sylpha (Kirby, 1890)

Synonyms
- Larinopoda sylpha Kirby, 1890

= Ornipholidotos sylpha =

Species of butterfly

Ornipholidotos sylpha is a butterfly in the family Lycaenidae. It is found in Cameroon and the Republic of the Congo. The habitat consists of forests.
