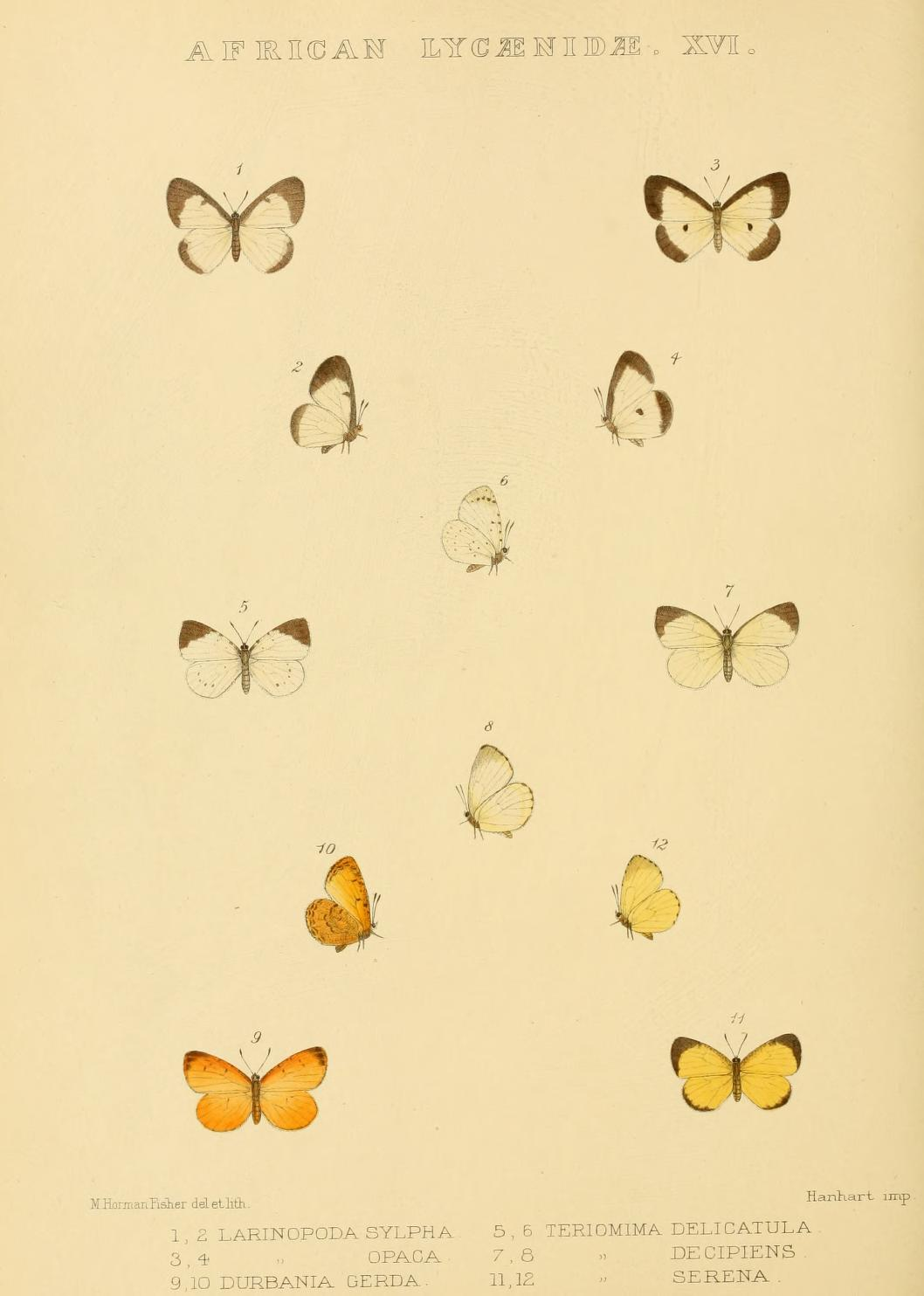

Scientific classification
- Kingdom: Animalia
- Phylum: Arthropoda
- Class: Insecta
- Order: Lepidoptera
- Family: Lycaenidae
- Genus: Liptena
- Species: L. decipiens

Binomial name
- Liptena decipiens (Kirby, 1890)

Synonyms
- Teriomima decipiens Kirby, 1890; Teriomima leucostola Holland, 1890; Liptena decipiens cameroona Bethune-Baker, 1926; Liptena citronensis Bethune-Baker, 1926

= Liptena decipiens =

Species of butterfly

Liptena decipiens, the deceptive liptena, is a butterfly in the family Lycaenidae. It is found in Nigeria, Cameroon, Gabon, the Republic of the Congo and the Democratic Republic of the Congo. The habitat consists of primary forests.

== Subspecies ==
- Liptena decipiens decipiens (Nigeria, western Cameroon)
- Liptena decipiens etoumbi Stempffer, Bennett & May, 1974 (Congo, northern Democratic Republic of the Congo)
- Liptena decipiens leucostola (Holland, 1890) (southern Cameroon, Gabon, Congo, Democratic Republic of the Congo: Uele, Equateur, Kinshasa and Sankuru)
