= Ornipholidotos jacksoni =

Scientific classification
- Kingdom: Animalia
- Phylum: Arthropoda
- Class: Insecta
- Order: Lepidoptera
- Family: Lycaenidae
- Genus: Ornipholidotos
- Species: O. jacksoni

Binomial name
- Ornipholidotos jacksoni Stempffer, 1961

Species of butterfly

Ornipholidotos jacksoni is a butterfly in the family Lycaenidae. It is found in Cameroon, the Republic of the Congo, Gabon, the Democratic Republic of the Congo, Uganda, Kenya and Tanzania. The habitat consists of forests.

== Subspecies ==
- Ornipholidotos jacksoni jacksoni (north-eastern Democratic Republic of the Congo, southern Uganda, western Kenya, north-western Tanzania)
- Ornipholidotos jacksoni occidentalis Libert, 2005 (Cameroon, Congo, Gabon)
