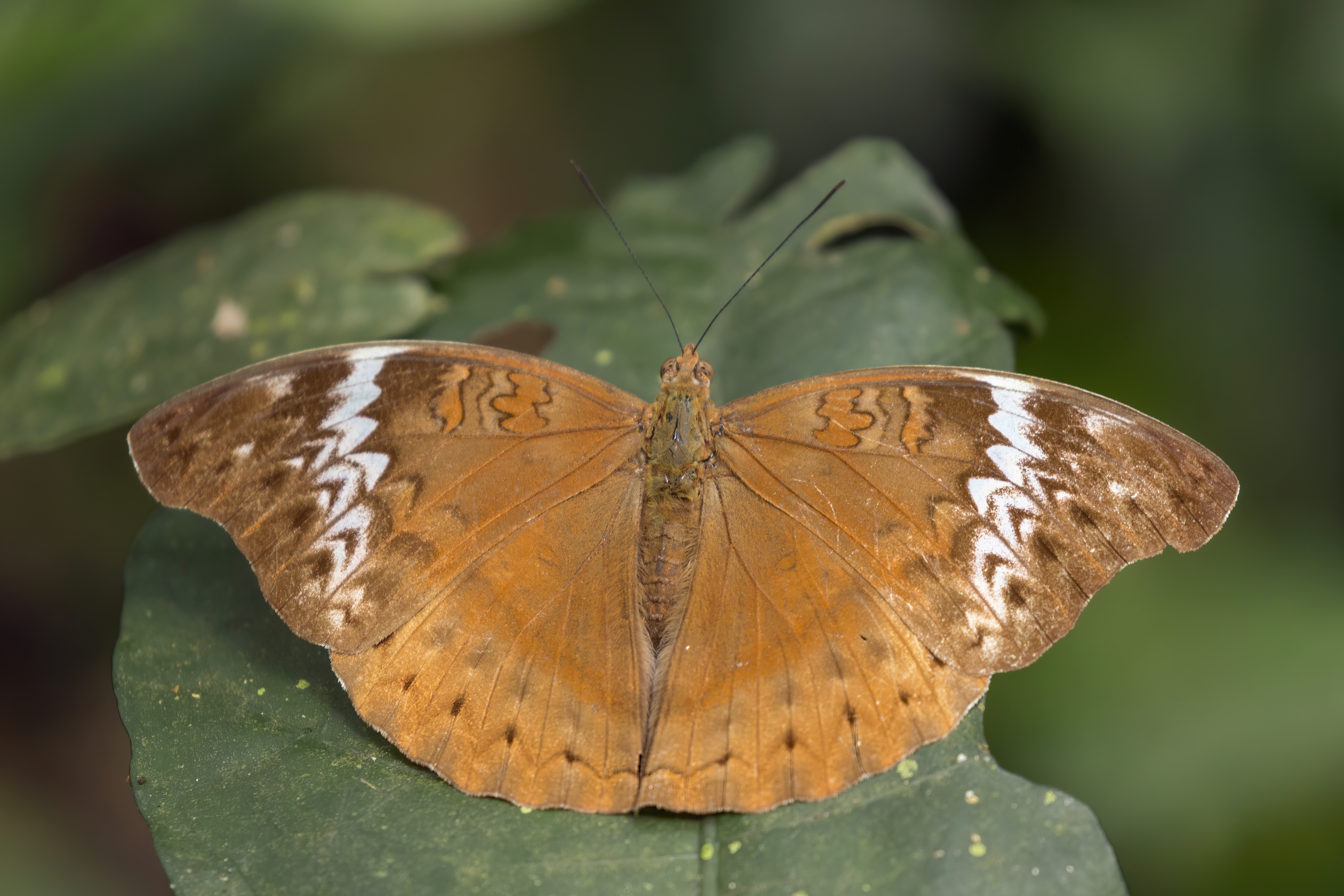
- Female Cymothoe lurida butleri Kibale Forest, Uganda

Scientific classification
- Kingdom: Animalia
- Phylum: Arthropoda
- Class: Insecta
- Order: Lepidoptera
- Family: Nymphalidae
- Genus: Cymothoe
- Species: C. lurida

Binomial name
- Cymothoe lurida (Butler, 1871)

Synonyms
- Harma lurida Butler, 1871; Cymothoe hesione Weymer, 1907; Cymothoe congoensis Suffert, 1904; Cymothoe lurida var. butleri ab. rufobrunnea Neustetter, 1912; Cymothoe butleri var. dubia Schouteden, 1912; Cymothoe butleri Grünberg, 1908; Cymothoe lurida centralis f. sublustris Overlaet, 1952

= Cymothoe lurida =

Lurid glider

Species of butterfly

Cymothoe lurida, the lurid glider, is a butterfly in the family Nymphalidae. It is found in Côte d'Ivoire, Ghana, Nigeria, Cameroon, Equatorial Guinea, Gabon, the Republic of the Congo, the Central African Republic, Angola, the Democratic Republic of the Congo, Uganda, Kenya, Tanzania and Zambia. The habitat consists of lowland to submontane forests, including riparian forests.

Males of the species mud-puddle. Both sexes are attracted to fermenting bananas.

The larvae feed on Dovyalis, Rawsonia and Rinorea species.

== Subspecies ==
- Cymothoe lurida lurida (Ivory Coast, Ghana)
- Cymothoe lurida azumai Carcasson, 1964 (north-western Tanzania, Zambia)
- Cymothoe lurida butleri Grünberg, 1908 (Uganda)
- Cymothoe lurida centralis Overlaet, 1952 (Democratic Republic of the Congo: central to Lualaba, Kasai, Lomami and Sankuru)
- Cymothoe lurida hesione Weymer, 1907 (Nigeria: Cross River loop, Cameroon, Gabon, Congo, Central African Republic, northern Angola, western Democratic Republic of the Congo)
- Cymothoe lurida sublurida Fruhstorfer, 1903 (Bioko)
- Cymothoe lurida tristis Overlaet, 1952 (Congo, Uganda: west to Bwamba and Toro, Democratic Republic of the Congo: Kinshasa, Mongala, Uele, Ituri and Kivu)
