= Ornipholidotos bakotae =

Scientific classification
- Kingdom: Animalia
- Phylum: Arthropoda
- Class: Insecta
- Order: Lepidoptera
- Family: Lycaenidae
- Genus: Ornipholidotos
- Species: O. bakotae

Binomial name
- Ornipholidotos bakotae Stempffer, 1962

Species of butterfly

Ornipholidotos bakotae, the tiny glasswing, is a butterfly in the family Lycaenidae. It is found in Cameroon, the Republic of the Congo and Gabon. The habitat consists of forests.
