= Ornipholidotos likouala =

Scientific classification
- Kingdom: Animalia
- Phylum: Arthropoda
- Class: Insecta
- Order: Lepidoptera
- Family: Lycaenidae
- Genus: Ornipholidotos
- Species: O. likouala

Binomial name
- Ornipholidotos likouala Stempffer, 1969

Species of butterfly

Ornipholidotos likouala is a butterfly in the family Lycaenidae. It is found in the Republic of the Congo. The habitat consists of forests.
