= Ornipholidotos bitjeensis =

Scientific classification
- Kingdom: Animalia
- Phylum: Arthropoda
- Class: Insecta
- Order: Lepidoptera
- Family: Lycaenidae
- Genus: Ornipholidotos
- Species: O. bitjeensis

Binomial name
- Ornipholidotos bitjeensis Stempffer, 1957

Species of butterfly

Ornipholidotos bitjeensis is a butterfly in the family Lycaenidae. It is found in Cameroon, Gabon and the Republic of the Congo. The habitat consists of forests.
