= Ornipholidotos nbeti =

Scientific classification
- Kingdom: Animalia
- Phylum: Arthropoda
- Class: Insecta
- Order: Lepidoptera
- Family: Lycaenidae
- Genus: Ornipholidotos
- Species: O. nbeti

Binomial name
- Ornipholidotos nbeti Libert, 2005

Species of butterfly

Ornipholidotos nbeti is a butterfly in the family Lycaenidae. It is found in Cameroon, Equatorial Guinea, the Republic of the Congo, the Central African Republic and the Democratic Republic of the Congo. The habitat consists of forests.
