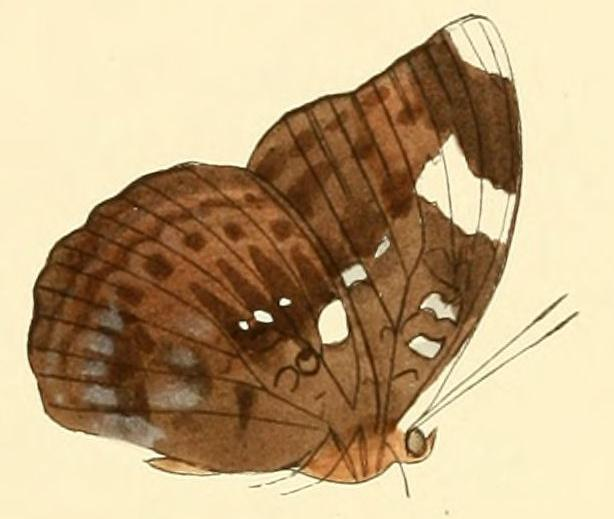

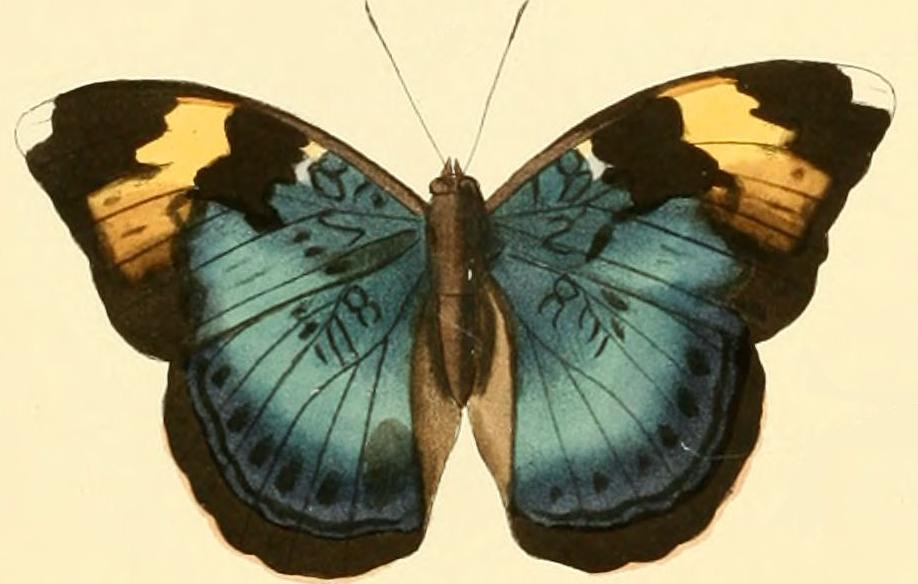

Scientific classification
- Kingdom: Animalia
- Phylum: Arthropoda
- Class: Insecta
- Order: Lepidoptera
- Family: Nymphalidae
- Genus: Bebearia
- Species: B. phranza

Binomial name
- Bebearia phranza (Hewitson, 1865)

Synonyms
- Euryphene phranza Hewitson, 1865; Bebearia (Bebearia) phranza; Euryphene phranza f. moreelsi Aurivillius, 1901; Euriphene phranza robiginosus Talbot, 1927

= Bebearia phranza =

Species of butterfly

Bebearia phranza, the white-spot forester, is a butterfly in the family Nymphalidae. It is found in Nigeria, Cameroon, the Republic of the Congo, the Central African Republic and the Democratic Republic of the Congo. The habitat consists of forests.

E. phranza Hew. (41 b) may be known at once by the large snow-white spot in cellule 7 on the hindwing beneath; behind this there are two small white spots in cellules 5 and 6. In the wings are dark yellowish brown above with sharply defined black transverse markings; the second transverse band of the forewing is thick and deep black, the third on the other hand narrow and at the costal margin indistinct; the submarginal line is placed near to the distal margin and is on the hindwing weakly and somewhat irregularly undulate; the under surface is dark grey-brown, rather uniform and with indistinct markings; the costal margin of the forewing is broadly white at the base and the extreme apex whitish grey. The female differs from the allied species in having the apex of the forewing white on both surfaces; the forewing has between the costal margin and vein 4 a subapical band, which is yellowish above, white beneath; the cell and cellules la—2 of the forewing as far as the fourth transverse band and also the entire hindwing to the submarginal line are suffused with green; the green colour is lighter in the middle of the hindwing, forming a light grey median band; the under surface is nearly as dark as in the male and has two additional white transverse spots i. the cell of the forewing. From the Niger to the Kuilu River. Female-ab. moreelsi Auriv. [now subspecies] only differs in lacking entirely the green colour of the upper surface and in having the ground-colour of both wings above black brown. Ikelemba, Congo.

Adults are attracted to fallen fruit.

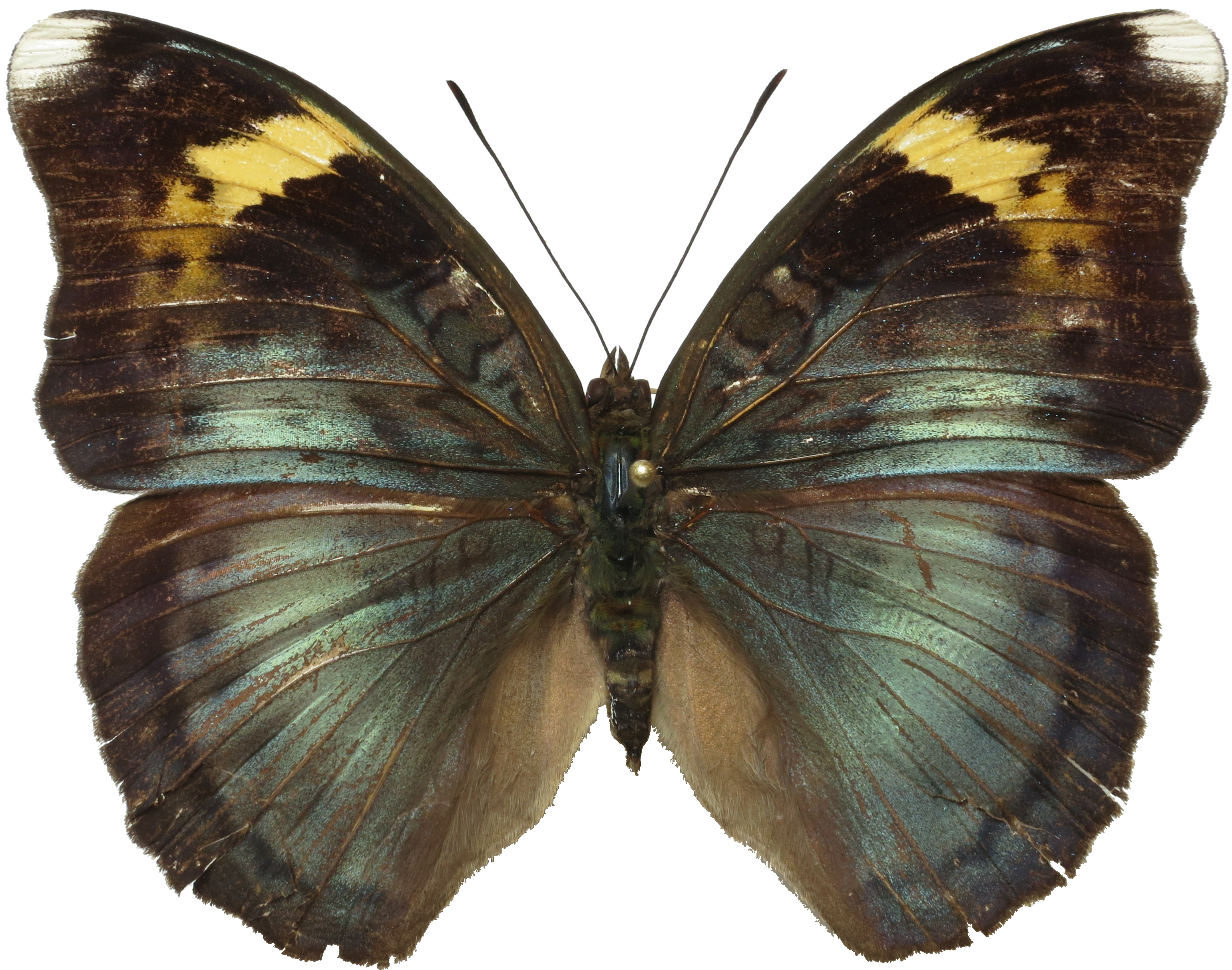
Bebearia phranza female, Mbalmayo, Cameroon

== Subspecies ==
- Bebearia phranza phranza (Nigeria, Cameroon, Congo)
- Bebearia phranza fuscara Hecq, 1989 (northern Congo, Central African Republic, Democratic Republic of the Congo: Ubangi)
- Bebearia phranza moreelsi d'Abrera, 1980 (Democratic Republic of the Congo: central and east to Uele, Ituri, northern Kivu, Equateur, Kasai, Sankuru and Lomami)
- Bebearia phranza robiginosus (Talbot, 1927) (Democratic Republic of the Congo: Shaba)
