= List of butterflies of the Central African Republic =

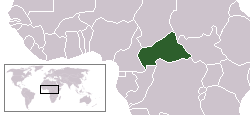
Location of the Central African Republic

This is a list of butterflies of the Central African Republic. About 597 species are known from the Central African Republic, 19 of which are endemic.

== Papilionidae ==
=== Papilioninae ===
==== Papilionini ====
- Papilio antimachus Drury, 1782
- Papilio zalmoxis Hewitson, 1864
- Papilio nireus Linnaeus, 1758
- Papilio chrapkowskoides nurettini Koçak, 1983
- Papilio sosia pulchra Berger, 1950
- Papilio plagiatus Aurivillius, 1898
- Papilio dardanus Brown, 1776
- Papilio phorcas congoanus Rothschild, 1896
- Papilio cyproeofila praecyola Suffert, 1904
- Papilio mechowi Dewitz, 1881
- Papilio mechowianus Dewitz, 1885

==== Leptocercini ====
- Graphium antheus (Cramer, 1779)
- Graphium policenes telloi Hecq, 1999
- Graphium colonna (Ward, 1873)
- Graphium illyris girardeaui Guilbot & Plantrou, 1978
- Graphium angolanus baronis (Ungemach, 1932)
- Graphium ridleyanus (White, 1843)
- Graphium leonidas (Fabricius, 1793)
- Graphium tynderaeus (Fabricius, 1793)
- Graphium latreillianus theorini (Aurivillius, 1881)
- Graphium adamastor (Boisduval, 1836)
- Graphium agamedes (Westwood, 1842)
- Graphium schubotzi (Schultze, 1913)
- Graphium abri Smith & Vane-Wright, 2001 (endemic)
- Graphium almansor escherichi (Gaede, 1915)
- Graphium auriger (Butler, 1876)
- Graphium hachei moebii (Suffert, 1904)
- Graphium ucalegon (Hewitson, 1865)
- Graphium simoni (Aurivillius, 1899)

== Pieridae ==
=== Pseudopontiinae ===
- Pseudopontia paradoxa (Felder & Felder, 1869)

=== Coliadinae ===
- Eurema brigitta (Stoll, [1780])
- Eurema hecabe solifera (Butler, 1875)
- Catopsilia florella (Fabricius, 1775)

=== Pierinae ===
- Colotis celimene sudanicus (Aurivillius, 1905)
- Colotis euippe (Linnaeus, 1758)
- Nepheronia pharis (Boisduval, 1836)
- Leptosia alcesta (Stoll, [1782])
- Leptosia bastini Hecq, 1997
- Leptosia hybrida Bernardi, 1952
- Leptosia marginea (Mabille, 1890)
- Leptosia wigginsi pseudalcesta Bernardi, 1965

==== Pierini ====
- Appias epaphia (Cramer, [1779])
- Appias sabina (Felder & Felder, [1865])
- Appias sylvia (Fabricius, 1775)
- Mylothris agathina richlora Suffert, 1904
- Mylothris chloris (Fabricius, 1775)
- Mylothris rhodope (Fabricius, 1775)
- Dixeia doxo (Godart, 1819)
- Belenois aurota (Fabricius, 1793)
- Belenois calypso dentigera Butler, 1888
- Belenois solilucis Butler, 1874
- Belenois subeida (Felder & Felder, 1865)
- Belenois sudanensis pseudodentigera Berger, 1981
- Belenois theora ratheo (Suffert, 1904)
- Belenois theuszi (Dewitz, 1889)

== Lycaenidae ==
=== Miletinae ===
==== Liphyrini ====
- Euliphyra mirifica Holland, 1890
- Aslauga purpurascens Holland, 1890

==== Miletini ====
- Megalopalpus metaleucus Karsch, 1893
- Megalopalpus zymna (Westwood, 1851)
- Lachnocnema emperamus (Snellen, 1872)
- Lachnocnema divergens Gaede, 1915
- Lachnocnema vuattouxi Libert, 1996

=== Poritiinae ===
==== Liptenini ====
- Alaena subrubra Bethune-Baker, 1915
- Ptelina carnuta (Hewitson, 1873)
- Pentila pauli leopardina Schultze, 1923
- Telipna acraea nigrita Talbot, 1935
- Telipna albofasciata Aurivillius, 1910
- Telipna atrinervis Hulstaert, 1924
- Telipna hollandi exsuperia Hulstaert, 1924
- Telipna citrimaculata Schultze, 1916
- Telipna sanguinea (Plötz, 1880)
- Telipna consanguinea Rebel, 1914
- Telipna nyanza katangae Stempffer, 1961
- Telipna ruspinoides Schultze, 1923
- Ornipholidotos ugandae goodi Libert, 2000
- Ornipholidotos abriana Libert, 2005
- Ornipholidotos amieti Libert, 2005
- Ornipholidotos overlaeti fontainei Libert, 2005
- Ornipholidotos gemina fournierae Libert, 2005
- Ornipholidotos congoensis Stempffer, 1964
- Ornipholidotos nbeti Libert, 2005
- Ornipholidotos jax Collins & Larsen, 1998 (endemic)
- Ornipholidotos paradoxa centralis Libert, 2005
- Ornipholidotos mathildae uniformis Libert, 2005
- Mimacraea abriana Libert & Collins, 2000
- Mimeresia debora (Kirby, 1890)
- Liptena lloydi Collins & Larsen, 2008
- Liptena modesta (Kirby, 1890)
- Obania subvariegata (Grose-Smith & Kirby, 1890)
- Tetrarhanis ilala etoumbi (Stempffer, 1964)
- Tetrarhanis stempfferi (Berger, 1954)
- Falcuna synesia fusca Stempffer & Bennett, 1963
- Larinopoda lircaea (Hewitson, 1866)
- Eresiomera isca (Hewitson, 1873)
- Eresiomera nancy Collins & Larsen, 1998
- Eresiomera phillipi Collins & Larsen, 1998 (endemic)
- Citrinophila erastus (Hewitson, 1866)
- Argyrocheila undifera Staudinger, 1892

==== Epitolini ====
- Iridana rougeoti Stempffer, 1964
- Epitola urania Kirby, 1887
- Epitola uranioides uranoides Libert, 1999
- Cerautola ceraunia (Hewitson, 1873)
- Cerautola crowleyi leucographa Libert, 1999
- Cerautola miranda vidua (Talbot, 1935)
- Cerautola semibrunnea (Bethune-Baker, 1916)
- Cerautola hewitsoni (Mabille, 1877)
- Cerautola hewitsonioides (Hawker-Smith, 1933)
- Geritola cyanea (Jackson, 1964)
- Geritola dubia (Jackson, 1964)
- Geritola gerina (Hewitson, 1878)
- Geritola goodii (Holland, 1890)
- Geritola liana (Roche, 1954)
- Geritola virginea (Bethune-Baker, 1904)
- Geritola subargentea continua Libert, 1999
- Stempfferia annae Libert, 1999
- Stempfferia cercene (Hewitson, 1873)
- Stempfferia cercenoides (Holland, 1890)
- Stempfferia cinerea (Berger, 1981)
- Stempfferia coerulea pierri Libert, 1999
- Stempfferia congoana (Aurivillius, 1923)
- Stempfferia ginettae Libert, 1999
- Stempfferia gordoni (Druce, 1903)
- Stempfferia insulana (Aurivillius, 1923)
- Stempfferia marginata (Kirby, 1887)
- Stempfferia similis Libert, 1999
- Stempfferia sylviae Libert, 1999
- Stempfferia tumentia (Druce, 1910)
- Stempfferia zelza (Hewitson, 1873)
- Cephetola catuna (Kirby, 1890)
- Cephetola cephena (Hewitson, 1873)
- Cephetola chari Libert & Collins, 1999 (endemic)
- Cephetola eliasis epitolina Libert & Collins, 1999
- Cephetola ghesquierei (Roche, 1954)
- Cephetola godarti Libert & Collins, 1999 (endemic)
- Cephetola izidori (Kielland & Congdon, 1998)
- Cephetola karinae Bouyer & Libert, 1999 (endemic)
- Cephetola kiellandi (Libert & Congdon, 1998)
- Cephetola maculata (Hawker-Smith, 1926)
- Cephetola mariae Libert, 1999
- Cephetola orientalis (Roche, 1954)
- Cephetola oubanguensis Libert & Collins, 1999 (endemic)
- Cephetola ouesso (Jackson, 1962)
- Cephetola pinodes budduana (Talbot, 1937)
- Cephetola subgriseata (Jackson, 1964)
- Cephetola sublustris (Bethune-Baker, 1904)
- Cephetola vinalli (Talbot, 1935)
- Cephetola viridana (Joicey & Talbot, 1921)
- Epitolina dispar (Kirby, 1887)
- Epitolina melissa (Druce, 1888)
- Epitolina collinsi Libert, 2000
- Epitolina catori ugandae Jackson, 1962
- Epitolina larseni Libert, 2000
- Hypophytala benitensis (Holland, 1890)
- Hypophytala henleyi (Kirby, 1890)
- Hypophytala hyetta latifascia Libert & Collins, 1999
- Hewitsonia boisduvalii (Hewitson, 1869)
- Hewitsonia inexpectata Bouyer, 1997

=== Aphnaeinae ===
- Pseudaletis agrippina Druce, 1888
- Pseudaletis camarensis Collins & Libert, 2007
- Pseudaletis clymenus (Druce, 1885)
- Pseudaletis lusambo Stempffer, 1961
- Pseudaletis zebra Holland, 1891
- Pseudaletis rileyi Libert, 2007
- Pseudaletis antimachus (Staudinger, 1888)
- Pseudaletis batesi Druce, 1910
- Pseudaletis dolieri Collins & Libert, 2007
- Cigaritis crustaria (Holland, 1890)
- Zeritis neriene Boisduval, 1836
- Zeritis pulcherrima Aurivillius, 1923
- Axiocerses harpax ugandana Clench, 1963
- Aphnaeus argyrocyclus Holland, 1890
- Aphnaeus asterius Plötz, 1880
- Aphnaeus orcas (Drury, 1782)

=== Theclinae ===
- Oxylides albata (Aurivillius, 1895)
- Syrmoptera caritas Libert, 2004 (endemic)
- Hypolycaena antifaunus (Westwood, 1851)
- Hypolycaena dubia Aurivillius, 1895
- Hypolycaena lebona (Hewitson, 1865)
- Hypolycaena nigra Bethune-Baker, 1914
- Iolaus fontainei (Stempffer, 1956)
- Iolaus icipe Collins & Larsen, 1998
- Iolaus calisto (Westwood, 1851)
- Iolaus catori Bethune-Baker, 1904
- Iolaus kyabobo Larsen, 1996
- Pilodeudorix mimeta (Karsch, 1895)
- Pilodeudorix ula (Karsch, 1895)
- Pilodeudorix virgata (Druce, 1891)
- Pilodeudorix angelita (Suffert, 1904)
- Pilodeudorix aruma aruma (Hewitson, 1873)
- Pilodeudorix aruma pallidior Libert, 2004
- Pilodeudorix leonina indentata Libert, 2004
- Pilodeudorix otraeda genuba (Hewitson, 1875)
- Pilodeudorix camerona (Plötz, 1880)
- Pilodeudorix congoana (Aurivillius, 1923)
- Pilodeudorix zela (Hewitson, 1869)
- Pilodeudorix hugoi Libert, 2004
- Pilodeudorix corruscans (Aurivillius, 1898)
- Pilodeudorix deritas (Hewitson, 1874)
- Pilodeudorix violetta (Aurivillius, 1897)
- Paradeudorix cobaltina (Stempffer, 1964)
- Paradeudorix ituri (Bethune-Baker, 1908)
- Paradeudorix marginata (Stempffer, 1962)
- Paradeudorix petersi (Stempffer & Bennett, 1956)
- Hypomyrina mimetica Libert, 2004
- Deudorix dinochares Grose-Smith, 1887
- Deudorix dinomenes diomedes Jackson, 1966
- Deudorix kayonza Stempffer, 1956
- Deudorix lorisona (Hewitson, 1862)
- Deudorix odana Druce, 1887

=== Polyommatinae ===
==== Lycaenesthini ====
- Anthene irumu (Stempffer, 1948)
- Anthene lachares lachares (Hewitson, 1878)
- Anthene lachares toroensis Stempffer, 1947
- Anthene larydas (Cramer, 1780)
- Anthene leptines (Hewitson, 1874)
- Anthene locuples (Grose-Smith, 1898)
- Anthene lysicles (Hewitson, 1874)
- Anthene scintillula (Holland, 1891)
- Anthene starki Larsen, 2005
- Anthene sylvanus (Drury, 1773)
- Anthene lamprocles (Hewitson, 1878)
- Anthene lusones (Hewitson, 1874)
- Anthene rufoplagata (Bethune-Baker, 1910)
- Cupidesthes robusta Aurivillius, 1895

==== Polyommatini ====
- Cupidopsis jobates mauritanica Riley, 1932
- Uranothauma falkensteini (Dewitz, 1879)
- Phlyaria cyara (Hewitson, 1876)
- Tuxentius carana (Hewitson, 1876)
- Euchrysops cyclopteris (Butler, 1876)
- Euchrysops reducta Hulstaert, 1924
- Euchrysops sagba Libert, 1993
- Thermoniphas fumosa Stempffer, 1952
- Thermoniphas togara (Plötz, 1880)
- Oboronia guessfeldti (Dewitz, 1879)
- Oboronia punctatus (Dewitz, 1879)
- Lepidochrysops parsimon (Fabricius, 1775)

== Nymphalidae ==
=== Danainae ===
==== Danaini ====
- Danaus chrysippus alcippus (Cramer, 1777)
- Amauris niavius (Linnaeus, 1758)
- Amauris hecate (Butler, 1866)
- Amauris vashti (Butler, 1869)

=== Satyrinae ===
==== Elymniini ====
- Elymniopsis bammakoo (Westwood, [1851])

==== Melanitini ====
- Gnophodes betsimena parmeno Doubleday, 1849
- Gnophodes chelys (Fabricius, 1793)
- Melanitis ansorgei Rothschild, 1904

==== Satyrini ====
- Bicyclus alboplaga (Rebel, 1914)
- Bicyclus angulosa (Butler, 1868)
- Bicyclus auricruda fulgidus Fox, 1963
- Bicyclus dubia (Aurivillius, 1893)
- Bicyclus ephorus bergeri Condamin, 1965
- Bicyclus golo (Aurivillius, 1893)
- Bicyclus hewitsoni (Doumet, 1861)
- Bicyclus ignobilis eurini Condamin & Fox, 1963
- Bicyclus italus (Hewitson, 1865)
- Bicyclus mandanes Hewitson, 1873
- Bicyclus medontias (Hewitson, 1873)
- Bicyclus mollitia (Karsch, 1895)
- Bicyclus pavonis (Butler, 1876)
- Bicyclus sambulos (Hewitson, 1877)
- Bicyclus sandace (Hewitson, 1877)
- Bicyclus sangmelinae Condamin, 1963
- Bicyclus sebetus (Hewitson, 1877)
- Bicyclus sophrosyne (Plötz, 1880)
- Bicyclus sweadneri Fox, 1963
- Bicyclus taenias (Hewitson, 1877)
- Bicyclus trilophus jacksoni Condamin, 1961
- Hallelesis asochis congoensis (Joicey & Talbot, 1921)
- Ypthima doleta Kirby, 1880

=== Charaxinae ===
==== Charaxini ====
- Charaxes varanes vologeses (Mabille, 1876)
- Charaxes fulvescens fulvescens (Aurivillius, 1891)
- Charaxes fulvescens monitor Rothschild, 1900
- Charaxes protoclea protonothodes van Someren, 1971
- Charaxes boueti Feisthamel, 1850
- Charaxes cynthia kinduana Le Cerf, 1923
- Charaxes lucretius intermedius van Someren, 1971
- Charaxes lactetinctus Karsch, 1892
- Charaxes jasius brunnescens Poulton, 1926
- Charaxes epijasius Reiche, 1850
- Charaxes castor (Cramer, 1775)
- Charaxes octavus Minig, 1972 (endemic)
- Charaxes brutus angustus Rothschild, 1900
- Charaxes pollux (Cramer, 1775)
- Charaxes eudoxus mechowi Rothschild, 1900
- Charaxes richelmanni Röber, 1936
- Charaxes numenes aequatorialis van Someren, 1972
- Charaxes fuscus (Charaxes × fuscus) Plantrou, 1967 (endemic) - a natural hybrid between Charaxes numenes × probably Charaxes cynthia
- Charaxes tiridates tiridatinus Röber, 1936
- Charaxes bipunctatus ugandensis van Someren, 1972
- Charaxes mixtus Rothschild, 1894
- Charaxes smaragdalis Butler, 1866
- Charaxes imperialis albipuncta Joicey & Talbot, 1920
- Charaxes ameliae Doumet, 1861
- Charaxes pythodoris occidens van Someren, 1963
- Charaxes hadrianus Ward, 1871
- Charaxes lecerfi Lathy, 192
- Charaxes nobilis Druce, 1873
- Charaxes superbus Schultze, 1909
- Charaxes acraeoides Druce, 1908
- Charaxes fournierae Le Moult, 1930
- Charaxes zingha (Stoll, 1780)
- Charaxes etesipe (Godart, 1824)
- Charaxes achaemenes monticola van Someren, 1970
- Charaxes eupale latimargo Joicey & Talbot, 1921
- Charaxes subornatus Schultze, 1916
- Charaxes anticlea proadusta van Someren, 1971
- Charaxes hildebrandti (Dewitz, 1879)
- Charaxes virilis van Someren & Jackson, 1952
- Charaxes catachrous van Someren & Jackson, 1952
- Charaxes etheocles ochracea van Someren & Jackson, 1957
- Charaxes bocqueti oubanguiensis Minig, 1975
- Charaxes cedreatis Hewitson, 1874
- Charaxes viola picta van Someren & Jackson, 1952
- Charaxes kheili Staudinger, 1896
- Charaxes pleione congoensis Plantrou, 1989
- Charaxes paphianus Ward, 1871
- Charaxes kahldeni Homeyer & Dewitz, 1882
- Charaxes nichetes Grose-Smith, 1883
- Charaxes lycurgus bernardiana Plantrou, 1978
- Charaxes zelica rougeoti Plantrou, 1978
- Charaxes porthos Grose-Smith, 1883
- Charaxes doubledayi Aurivillius, 1899
- Charaxes mycerina nausicaa Staudinger, 1891
- Charaxes bernardii Minig, 1978 (endemic)

==== Euxanthini ====
- Charaxes eurinome ansellica (Butler, 1870)
- Charaxes crossleyi (Ward, 1871)
- Charaxes trajanus (Ward, 1871)

==== Pallini ====
- Palla publius centralis van Someren, 1975
- Palla ussheri dobelli (Hall, 1919)
- Palla violinitens coniger (Butler, 1896)

=== Apaturinae ===
- Apaturopsis cleochares (Hewitson, 1873)

=== Nymphalinae ===
- Kallimoides rumia jadyae (Fox, 1968)

==== Nymphalini ====
- Junonia stygia (Aurivillius, 1894)
- Junonia westermanni Westwood, 1870
- Junonia cymodoce lugens (Schultze, 1912)
- Salamis cacta (Fabricius, 1793)
- Protogoniomorpha anacardii (Linnaeus, 1758)
- Protogoniomorpha parhassus (Drury, 1782)
- Protogoniomorpha temora (Felder & Felder, 1867)
- Precis ceryne (Boisduval, 1847)
- Precis coelestina Dewitz, 1879
- Precis octavia (Cramer, 1777)
- Precis sinuata Plötz, 1880
- Hypolimnas anthedon (Doubleday, 1845)
- Hypolimnas dinarcha (Hewitson, 1865)
- Hypolimnas macarthuri Neidhoefer, 1972 (endemic)
- Hypolimnas mechowi (Dewitz, 1884)
- Hypolimnas misippus (Linnaeus, 1764)

=== Cyrestinae ===
==== Cyrestini ====
- Cyrestis camillus (Fabricius, 1781)

=== Biblidinae ===
==== Biblidini ====
- Mesoxantha ethosea ethoseoides Rebel, 1914
- Ariadne albifascia (Joicey & Talbot, 1921)
- Ariadne enotrea suffusa (Joicey & Talbot, 1921)
- Ariadne pagenstecheri (Suffert, 1904)
- Eurytela alinda Mabille, 1893

==== Epicaliini ====
- Sevenia boisduvali omissa (Rothschild, 1918)
- Sevenia garega (Karsch, 1892)
- Sevenia pechueli sangbae (Hecq & Peeters, 1992)

=== Limenitinae ===
==== Limenitidini ====
- Cymothoe aramis (Hewitson, 1865)
- Cymothoe beckeri theodosia Staudinger, 1890
- Cymothoe caenis (Drury, 1773)
- Cymothoe capella (Ward, 1871)
- Cymothoe colmanti Aurivillius, 1898
- Cymothoe confusa Aurivillius, 1887
- Cymothoe excelsa Neustetter, 1912
- Cymothoe fumana balluca Fox & Howarth, 1968
- Cymothoe haynae diphyia Karsch, 1894
- Cymothoe herminia (Grose-Smith, 1887)
- Cymothoe hesiodotus Staudinger, 1890
- Cymothoe hobarti candidata Overlaet, 1954
- Cymothoe hypatha (Hewitson, 1866)
- Cymothoe indamora (Hewitson, 1866)
- Cymothoe jodutta ciceronis (Ward, 1871)
- Cymothoe lucasii binotorum Darge, 1985
- Cymothoe lurida hesione Weymer, 1907
- Cymothoe oemilius (Doumet, 1859)
- Cymothoe reginaeelisabethae belgarum Overlaet, 1952
- Cymothoe reinholdi vitalis Rebel, 1914
- Cymothoe weymeri Suffert, 1904
- Cymothoe zenkeri Richelmann, 1913
- Pseudoneptis bugandensis ianthe Hemming, 1964
- Pseudacraea boisduvalii (Doubleday, 1845)
- Pseudacraea dolomena (Hewitson, 1865)
- Pseudacraea eurytus (Linnaeus, 1758)
- Pseudacraea lucretia protracta (Butler, 1874)
- Pseudacraea semire (Cramer, 1779)

==== Neptidini ====
- Neptis jamesoni Godman & Salvin, 1890
- Neptis morosa Overlaet, 1955
- Neptis nicobule Holland, 1892
- Neptis nicomedes Hewitson, 1874
- Neptis strigata Aurivillius, 1894
- Neptis trigonophora melicertula Strand, 1912

==== Adoliadini ====
- Catuna angustatum (Felder & Felder, 1867)
- Catuna oberthueri Karsch, 1894
- Euryphura athymoides Berger, 1981
- Euryphura chalcis (Felder & Felder, 1860)
- Euryphura plautilla (Hewitson, 1865)
- Euryphurana nobilis (Staudinger, 1891)
- Cynandra opis bernardii Lagnel, 1967
- Euriphene hecqui Collins & Larsen, 1997
- Euriphene atossa (Hewitson, 1865)
- Euriphene barombina (Aurivillius, 1894)
- Euriphene grosesmithi (Staudinger, 1891)
- Euriphene schultzei (Aurivillius, 1909)
- Euriphene doriclea (Drury, 1782)
- Bebearia carshena (Hewitson, 1871)
- Bebearia absolon (Fabricius, 1793)
- Bebearia micans (Aurivillius, 1899)
- Bebearia zonara (Butler, 1871)
- Bebearia mandinga (Felder & Felder, 1860)
- Bebearia oxione squalida (Talbot, 1928)
- Bebearia cocalioides Hecq, 1988
- Bebearia paludicola Holmes, 2001
- Bebearia sophus (Fabricius, 1793)
- Bebearia staudingeri carensis Collins & Larsen, 2008
- Bebearia plistonax (Hewitson, 1874)
- Bebearia phranza fuscara Hecq, 1989
- Bebearia laetitia vesta Hecq, 1989
- Bebearia flaminia (Staudinger, 1891)
- Bebearia denticula Hecq, 2000
- Bebearia demetra obsolescens (Talbot, 1928)
- Bebearia tessmanni (Grünberg, 1910)
- Bebearia cutteri camiadei Hecq, 2002
- Bebearia eliensis (Hewitson, 1866)
- Bebearia barombina (Staudinger, 1896)
- Bebearia aurora wilverthi (Aurivillius, 1898)
- Bebearia braytoni (Sharpe, 1907)
- Bebearia chloeropis (Bethune-Baker, 1908)
- Bebearia makala (Bethune-Baker, 1908)
- Bebearia peetersi Hecq, 1994
- Bebearia pulchella Hecq, 2006 (endemic)
- Bebearia raeveli Hecq, 1989
- Euphaedra rubrocostata (Aurivillius, 1897)
- Euphaedra lupercoides Rothschild, 1918
- Euphaedra clio Hecq, 1981
- Euphaedra zaddachii elephantina Staudinger, 1891
- Euphaedra hewitsoni bipuncta Hecq, 1974
- Euphaedra hollandi Hecq, 1974
- Euphaedra caerulescens caerulescens Grose-Smith, 1890
- Euphaedra caerulescens caliginosa Hecq, 2004
- Euphaedra camiadei Hecq, 2004 (endemic)
- Euphaedra cyparissa aurata Carpenter, 1895
- Euphaedra cyparissa nominalina Pyrcz & Knoop, 2013
- Euphaedra eberti Aurivillius, 1896
- Euphaedra janetta campaspoides Hecq, 1985
- Euphaedra janetta remota Hecq, 1991
- Euphaedra campaspe (Felder & Felder, 1867)
- Euphaedra sarita (Sharpe, 1891)
- Euphaedra viridicaerulea inanoides Holland, 1920
- Euphaedra preussi Staudinger, 1891
- Euphaedra procera Hecq, 1984
- Euphaedra albofasciata Berger, 1981
- Euphaedra mayumbensis Hecq, 1984
- Euphaedra fascinata Hecq, 1984
- Euphaedra miranda Hecq, 1984
- Euphaedra simplex Hecq, 1978
- Euphaedra hybrida Hecq, 1978
- Euphaedra subferruginea Guillaumin, 1976
- Euphaedra sangbae Hecq, 1996 (endemic)
- Euphaedra edwardsii (van der Hoeven, 1845)
- Euphaedra ruspina (Hewitson, 1865)
- Euphaedra harpalyce spatiosa (Mabille, 1876)
- Euphaedra losinga losinga (Hewitson, 1864)
- Euphaedra losinga wardi (Druce, 1874)
- Euptera choveti Amiet & Collins, 1998
- Euptera collinsi Chovet & Libert, 1998 (endemic)
- Euptera crowleyi centralis Libert, 1995
- Euptera ducarmei Collins, 1998
- Euptera falsathyma Schultze, 1916
- Euptera pluto (Ward, 1873)
- Euptera schultzei Libert & Chovet, 1998
- Euptera semirufa Joicey & Talbot, 1921
- Pseudathyma callina (Grose-Smith, 1898)
- Pseudathyma cyrili Chovet, 2002
- Pseudathyma endjami Libert, 2002
- Pseudathyma michelae Libert, 2002

=== Heliconiinae ===
==== Acraeini ====
- Acraea endoscota Le Doux, 1928
- Acraea leucographa Ribbe, 1889
- Acraea neobule Doubleday, 1847
- Acraea quirina (Fabricius, 1781)
- Acraea egina (Cramer, 1775)
- Acraea sykesi Sharpe, 1902
- Acraea alciope Hewitson, 1852
- Acraea althoffi rubrofasciata Aurivillius, 1895
- Acraea aurivillii Staudinger, 1896
- Acraea serena (Fabricius, 1775)
- Acraea jodutta (Fabricius, 1793)
- Acraea orestia Hewitson, 1874
- Acraea pelopeia Staudinger, 1896
- Acraea vesperalis Grose-Smith, 1890
- Acraea orinata Oberthür, 1893
- Acraea peetersi Pierre, 1992 (endemic)
- Acraea atatis Pierre, 2004 (endemic)

==== Vagrantini ====
- Lachnoptera anticlia (Hübner, 1819)
- Phalanta eurytis (Doubleday, 1847)
- Phalanta phalantha aethiopica (Rothschild & Jordan, 1903)

== Hesperiidae ==
=== Coeliadinae ===
- Coeliades bixana Evans, 1940
- Coeliades forestan (Stoll, [1782])
- Coeliades hanno (Plötz, 1879)
- Coeliades pisistratus (Fabricius, 1793)

=== Pyrginae ===
==== Celaenorrhinini ====
- Celaenorrhinus chrysoglossa (Mabille, 1891)
- Celaenorrhinus illustris (Mabille, 1891)
- Celaenorrhinus meditrina (Hewitson, 1877)
- Celaenorrhinus ovalis Evans, 1937
- Celaenorrhinus rutilans (Mabille, 1877)
- Eretis lugens (Rogenhofer, 1891)
- Sarangesa brigida sanaga Miller, 1964
- Sarangesa majorella (Mabille, 1891)
- Sarangesa thecla (Plötz, 1879)

==== Tagiadini ====
- Tagiades flesus (Fabricius, 1781)
- Eagris hereus (Druce, 1875)
- Eagris subalbida aurivillii (Neustetter, 1927)
- Eagris tetrastigma (Mabille, 1891)
- Eagris tigris liberti Collins & Larsen, 2005
- Calleagris lacteus (Mabille, 1877)
- Calleagris landbecki (Druce, 1910)
- Procampta rara Holland, 1892
- Abantis ja Druce, 1909
- Abantis leucogaster (Mabille, 1890)
- Abantis rubra Holland, 1920

=== Hesperiinae ===
==== Aeromachini ====
- Gorgyra afikpo Druce, 1909
- Gorgyra aretina (Hewitson, 1878)
- Gorgyra bule Miller, 1964
- Gorgyra diversata Evans, 1937
- Gorgyra heterochrus (Mabille, 1890)
- Gorgyra kalinzu Evans, 1949
- Gorgyra mocquerysii Holland, 1896
- Gorgyra pali Evans, 1937
- Gorgyra rubescens Holland, 1896
- Gorgyra sara Evans, 1937
- Teniorhinus ignita (Mabille, 1877)
- Ceratrichia argyrosticta (Plötz, 1879)
- Ceratrichia flava Hewitson, 1878
- Ceratrichia nothus yakoli Collins & Larsen, 2003
- Ceratrichia semilutea Mabille, 1891
- Ceratrichia semlikensis Joicey & Talbot, 1921
- Pardaleodes edipus (Stoll, 1781)
- Pardaleodes sator pusiella Mabille, 1877
- Pardaleodes tibullus (Fabricius, 1793)
- Pardaleodes xanthopeplus Holland, 1892
- Xanthodisca astrape (Holland, 1892)
- Rhabdomantis galatia (Hewitson, 1868)
- Rhabdomantis sosia (Mabille, 1891)
- Osmodes adonia Evans, 1937
- Osmodes banghaasii Holland, 1896
- Osmodes costatus Aurivillius, 1896
- Osmodes hollandi Evans, 1937
- Osmodes laronia (Hewitson, 1868)
- Osmodes lindseyi Miller, 1964
- Osmodes lux Holland, 1892
- Osmodes omar Swinhoe, 1916
- Osmodes thora (Plötz, 1884)
- Parosmodes lentiginosa (Holland, 1896)
- Paracleros substrigata (Holland, 1893)
- Osphantes ogowena (Mabille, 1891)
- Acleros mackenii olaus (Plötz, 1884)
- Acleros nigrapex Strand, 1913
- Semalea arela (Mabille, 1891)
- Semalea atrio (Mabille, 1891)
- Semalea sextilis (Plötz, 1886)
- Hypoleucis sophia Evans, 1937
- Meza banda (Evans, 1937)
- Meza cybeutes (Holland, 1894)
- Meza mabea (Holland, 1894)
- Paronymus budonga (Evans, 1938)
- Paronymus nevea (Druce, 1910)
- Paronymus xanthias (Mabille, 1891)
- Andronymus caesar (Fabricius, 1793)
- Andronymus evander (Mabille, 1890)
- Andronymus helles Evans, 1937
- Andronymus hero Evans, 1937
- Andronymus neander (Plötz, 1884)
- Zophopetes ganda Evans, 1937
- Gamia abri Miller & Collins, 1997 (endemic)
- Gamia buchholzi (Plötz, 1879)
- Mopala orma (Plötz, 1879)
- Gretna balenge (Holland, 1891)
- Gretna carmen Evans, 1937
- Gretna cylinda (Hewitson, 1876)
- Gretna zaremba (Plötz, 1884)
- Pteroteinon caenira (Hewitson, 1867)
- Pteroteinon capronnieri (Plötz, 1879)
- Pteroteinon concaenira Belcastro & Larsen, 1996
- Leona binoevatus (Mabille, 1891)
- Leona lota Evans, 1937
- Leona stoehri (Karsch, 1893)
- Leona halma Evans, 1937
- Leona lissa Evans, 1937
- Caenides xychus (Mabille, 1891)
- Caenides dacela (Hewitson, 1876)
- Caenides hidaroides Aurivillius, 1896
- Caenides dacena (Hewitson, 1876)
- Monza alberti (Holland, 1896)
- Melphina noctula (Druce, 1909)
- Melphina tarace (Mabille, 1891)
- Melphina unistriga (Holland, 1893)
- Fresna carlo Evans, 1937
- Fresna cojo (Karsch, 1893)
- Fresna netopha (Hewitson, 1878)
- Platylesches chamaeleon (Mabille, 1891)

==== Baorini ====
- Borbo perobscura (Druce, 1912)

=== Heteropterinae ===
- Metisella tsadicus (Aurivillius, 1905)

== See also ==
- List of moths of the Central African Republic
- Wildlife of the Central African Republic
- Geography of the Central African Republic
- List of ecoregions in the Central African Republic
