= Cephetola katerae =

Scientific classification
- Kingdom: Animalia
- Phylum: Arthropoda
- Class: Insecta
- Order: Lepidoptera
- Family: Lycaenidae
- Genus: Cephetola
- Species: C. katerae

Binomial name
- Cephetola katerae (Jackson, 1962)

Synonyms
- Epitola katerae Jackson, 1962

Species of butterfly

Cephetola katerae is a butterfly in the family Lycaenidae. It is found in Cameroon, the Democratic Republic of the Congo, Uganda, Kenya, western Tanzania and Zambia. Its habitat consists of forests, including riparian forests.
