= Cephetola bwamba =

Scientific classification
- Kingdom: Animalia
- Phylum: Arthropoda
- Class: Insecta
- Order: Lepidoptera
- Family: Lycaenidae
- Genus: Cephetola
- Species: C. bwamba

Binomial name
- Cephetola bwamba (Jackson, 1964)

Synonyms
- Epitola bwamba Jackson, 1964

Species of butterfly

Cephetola bwamba is a butterfly in the family Lycaenidae. It is found in Uganda.
