= Cephetola kamengensis =

Scientific classification
- Kingdom: Animalia
- Phylum: Arthropoda
- Class: Insecta
- Order: Lepidoptera
- Family: Lycaenidae
- Genus: Cephetola
- Species: C. kamengensis

Binomial name
- Cephetola kamengensis (Jackson, 1962)

Synonyms
- Epitola kamengensis Jackson, 1962

Species of butterfly

Cephetola kamengensis is a butterfly in the family Lycaenidae. It is found in Uganda, western Kenya and north-western Tanzania. Its habitat consists of forest edges and gallery forests at altitudes ranging from 900 to 1,200 metres.

Adult females oviposit on lichens on the bark of twigs and tree trunks. The larvae are attended by ants.
