= Cephetola nigeriae =

Nigerian epitola

Scientific classification
- Kingdom: Animalia
- Phylum: Arthropoda
- Class: Insecta
- Order: Lepidoptera
- Family: Lycaenidae
- Genus: Cephetola
- Species: C. nigeriae

Binomial name
- Cephetola nigeriae (Jackson, 1962)

Synonyms
- Epitola nigeriae Jackson, 1962

Species of butterfly

Cephetola nigeriae, the Nigerian epitola, is a butterfly in the family Lycaenidae. It is found in Nigeria (the Cross River loop), Cameroon, Gabon and the Republic of the Congo. Its habitat consists of forests.
