= Cephetola mpangensis =

Scientific classification
- Kingdom: Animalia
- Phylum: Arthropoda
- Class: Insecta
- Order: Lepidoptera
- Family: Lycaenidae
- Genus: Cephetola
- Species: C. mpangensis

Binomial name
- Cephetola mpangensis (Jackson, 1962)

Synonyms
- Epitola mpangensis Jackson, 1962

Species of butterfly

Cephetola mpangensis is a butterfly in the family Lycaenidae. It is found in Uganda, north-western Tanzania and Kenya. Its habitat consists of primary forests.
