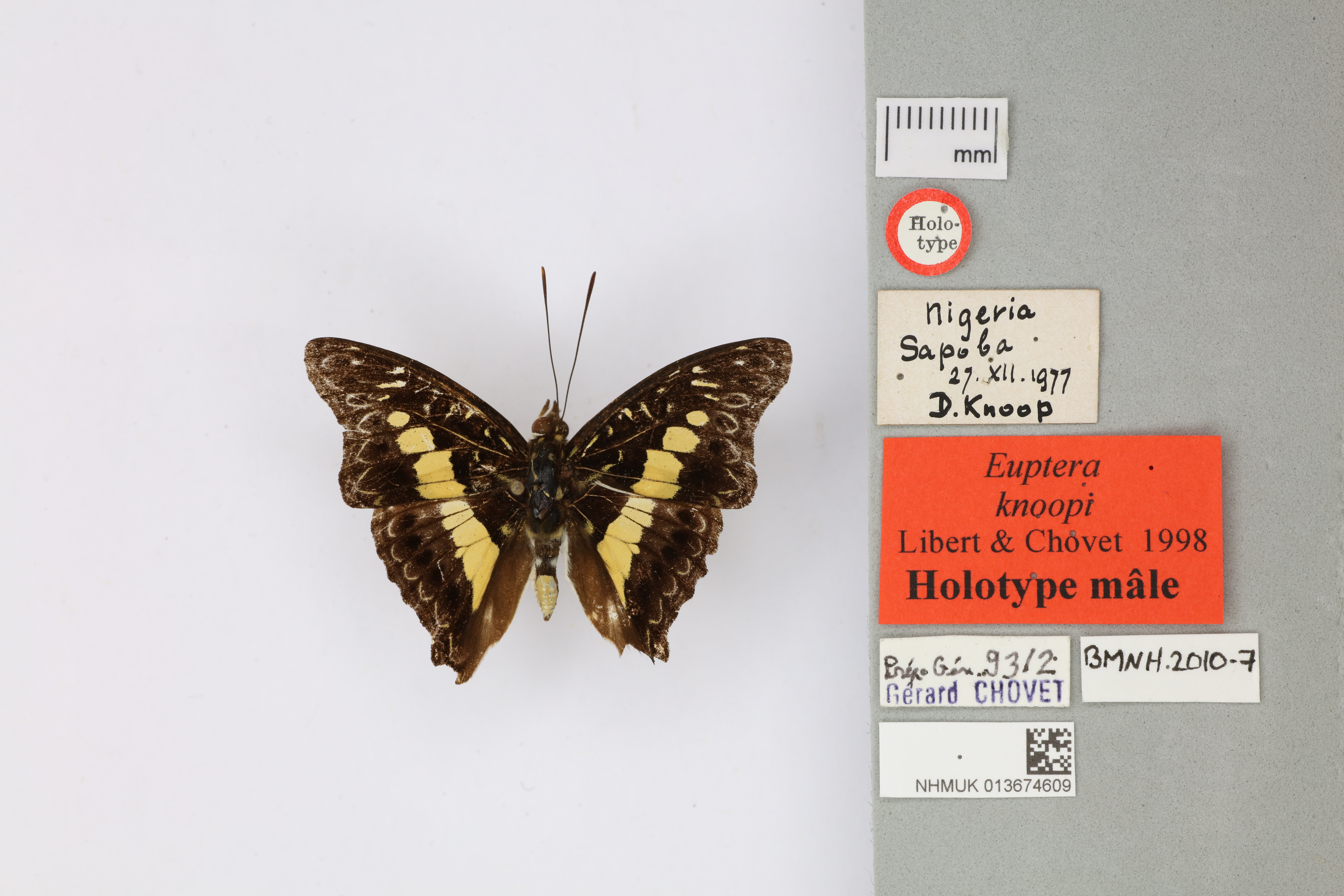

Scientific classification
- Domain: Eukaryota
- Kingdom: Animalia
- Phylum: Arthropoda
- Class: Insecta
- Order: Lepidoptera
- Family: Nymphalidae
- Genus: Euptera
- Species: E. knoopi

Binomial name
- Euptera knoopi Libert & Chovet, 1998

= Euptera knoopi =

Species of butterfly

Euptera knoopi, or Knoop's euptera, is a butterfly in the family Nymphalidae. It is found in Nigeria (Ubiaja and Ikom). The habitat consists of forests.
