= Cephetola kakamegae =

Scientific classification
- Kingdom: Animalia
- Phylum: Arthropoda
- Class: Insecta
- Order: Lepidoptera
- Family: Lycaenidae
- Genus: Cephetola
- Species: C. kakamegae

Binomial name
- Cephetola kakamegae Libert & Collins, 1999

Species of butterfly

Cephetola kakamegae is a subspecies of butterfly in the family Lycaenidae. It is found in the Democratic Republic of the Congo and Kenya. It was first described and named by Michael Libert in 1999.
