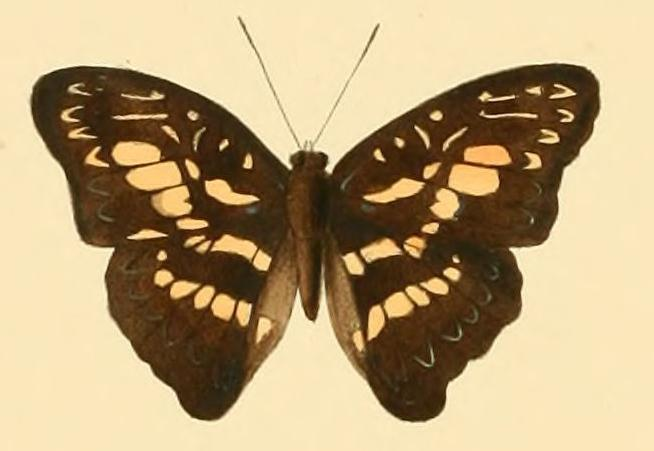

Scientific classification
- Kingdom: Animalia
- Phylum: Arthropoda
- Clade: Pancrustacea
- Class: Insecta
- Order: Lepidoptera
- Family: Nymphalidae
- Genus: Euptera
- Species: E. elabontas

Binomial name
- Euptera elabontas (Hewitson, 1871)

Synonyms
- Euryphene elabontas Hewitson, 1871

= Euptera elabontas =

Species of butterfly

Euptera elabontas, the common euptera, is a butterfly in the family Nymphalidae. It is found in Ivory Coast, Ghana, Benin, Nigeria, Cameroon, Equatorial Guinea, Gabon, the Republic of the Congo, the Central African Republic, the Democratic Republic of the Congo, Uganda, Kenya, Tanzania and Zambia. Its habitat consists of forests.

Adults are attracted to fermenting bananas.

The larvae feed on Synsepalum dulcificum, Synsepalum letouzeyi, Synsepalum longecuneatum, Vincentella revoluta and Englerophytum species.

== Subspecies ==
- Euptera elabontas elabontas (central and eastern Ivory Coast, Ghana: Kumasi, Benin, Nigeria, Cameroon, Gabon, Congo, Central African Republic, Democratic Republic of the Congo, north-western Tanzania)
- Euptera elabontas canui Collins, 1995 (Bioko)
- Euptera elabontas mweruensis Neave, 1910 (Uganda, western Kenya, north-western Tanzania, Democratic Republic of the Congo: Shaba, Zambia)

Torben Larsen developed a species numbering system for his 2005 publication Butterflies of West Africa. The nominate subspecies is #1122. The 'Larsen' numbers have since been used with permission in A Sharp Eye on Butterflies of Ghana.
