= Cephetola gerdae =

Scientific classification
- Kingdom: Animalia
- Phylum: Arthropoda
- Class: Insecta
- Order: Lepidoptera
- Family: Lycaenidae
- Genus: Cephetola
- Species: C. gerdae

Binomial name
- Cephetola gerdae (Kielland & Libert, 1998)

Synonyms
- Epitola gerdae Kielland & Libert, 1998

Species of butterfly

Cephetola gerdae is a butterfly in the family Lycaenidae. It is found in Tanzania.
