= Euptera falcata =

Scientific classification
- Kingdom: Animalia
- Phylum: Arthropoda
- Class: Insecta
- Order: Lepidoptera
- Family: Nymphalidae
- Genus: Euptera
- Species: E. falcata

Binomial name
- Euptera falcata Libert, 1998

Species of butterfly

Euptera falcata is a butterfly in the family Nymphalidae. It is found in Cameroon.
