= Euptera debruynei =

Scientific classification
- Kingdom: Animalia
- Phylum: Arthropoda
- Class: Insecta
- Order: Lepidoptera
- Family: Nymphalidae
- Genus: Euptera
- Species: E. debruynei

Binomial name
- Euptera debruynei (Hecq, 1990)

Synonyms
- Pseudathyma debruynei Hecq, 1990

Species of butterfly

Euptera debruynei is a butterfly in the family Nymphalidae. It is found in the north-eastern part of the Democratic Republic of the Congo.
