= Cephetola maesseni =

Scientific classification
- Kingdom: Animalia
- Phylum: Arthropoda
- Class: Insecta
- Order: Lepidoptera
- Family: Lycaenidae
- Genus: Cephetola
- Species: C. maesseni

Binomial name
- Cephetola maesseni Libert, 1999

Species of butterfly

Cephetola maesseni, the Maessen's greasy epitola, is a butterfly in the family Lycaenidae. It is found in Ivory Coast and Ghana (the Volta Region).
