= Cephetola subcoerulea =

Scientific classification
- Kingdom: Animalia
- Phylum: Arthropoda
- Class: Insecta
- Order: Lepidoptera
- Family: Lycaenidae
- Genus: Cephetola
- Species: C. subcoerulea

Binomial name
- Cephetola subcoerulea (Roche, 1954)

Synonyms
- Epitola subcoerulea Roche, 1954

Species of butterfly

Cephetola subcoerulea, the Roche's epitola, is a butterfly in the family Lycaenidae. It is found in the Gambia, Senegal (Basse Casamance), Sierra Leone, Ivory Coast, Ghana, eastern Nigeria, Cameroon and Equatorial Guinea (Bioko). Its habitat consists of forests.
