= Cephetola aureliae =

Scientific classification
- Kingdom: Animalia
- Phylum: Arthropoda
- Class: Insecta
- Order: Lepidoptera
- Family: Lycaenidae
- Genus: Cephetola
- Species: C. aureliae

Binomial name
- Cephetola aureliae Libert, 1999

Species of butterfly

Cephetola aureliae is a butterfly in the family Lycaenidae. It is found in the Democratic Republic of the Congo.
