= Euptera mirifica =

Scientific classification
- Domain: Eukaryota
- Kingdom: Animalia
- Phylum: Arthropoda
- Class: Insecta
- Order: Lepidoptera
- Family: Nymphalidae
- Genus: Euptera
- Species: E. mirifica

Binomial name
- Euptera mirifica Carpenter & Jackson, 1950

Species of butterfly

Euptera mirifica is a butterfly in the family Nymphalidae. It is found in Cameroon and the Democratic Republic of the Congo.
