= Cephetola ouesso =

Scientific classification
- Kingdom: Animalia
- Phylum: Arthropoda
- Class: Insecta
- Order: Lepidoptera
- Family: Lycaenidae
- Genus: Cephetola
- Species: C. ouesso

Binomial name
- Cephetola ouesso (Jackson, 1962)

Synonyms
- Epitola ouesso Jackson, 1962

Species of butterfly

Cephetola ouesso is a butterfly in the family Lycaenidae. It is found in Cameroon, the Republic of the Congo and the Central African Republic.
