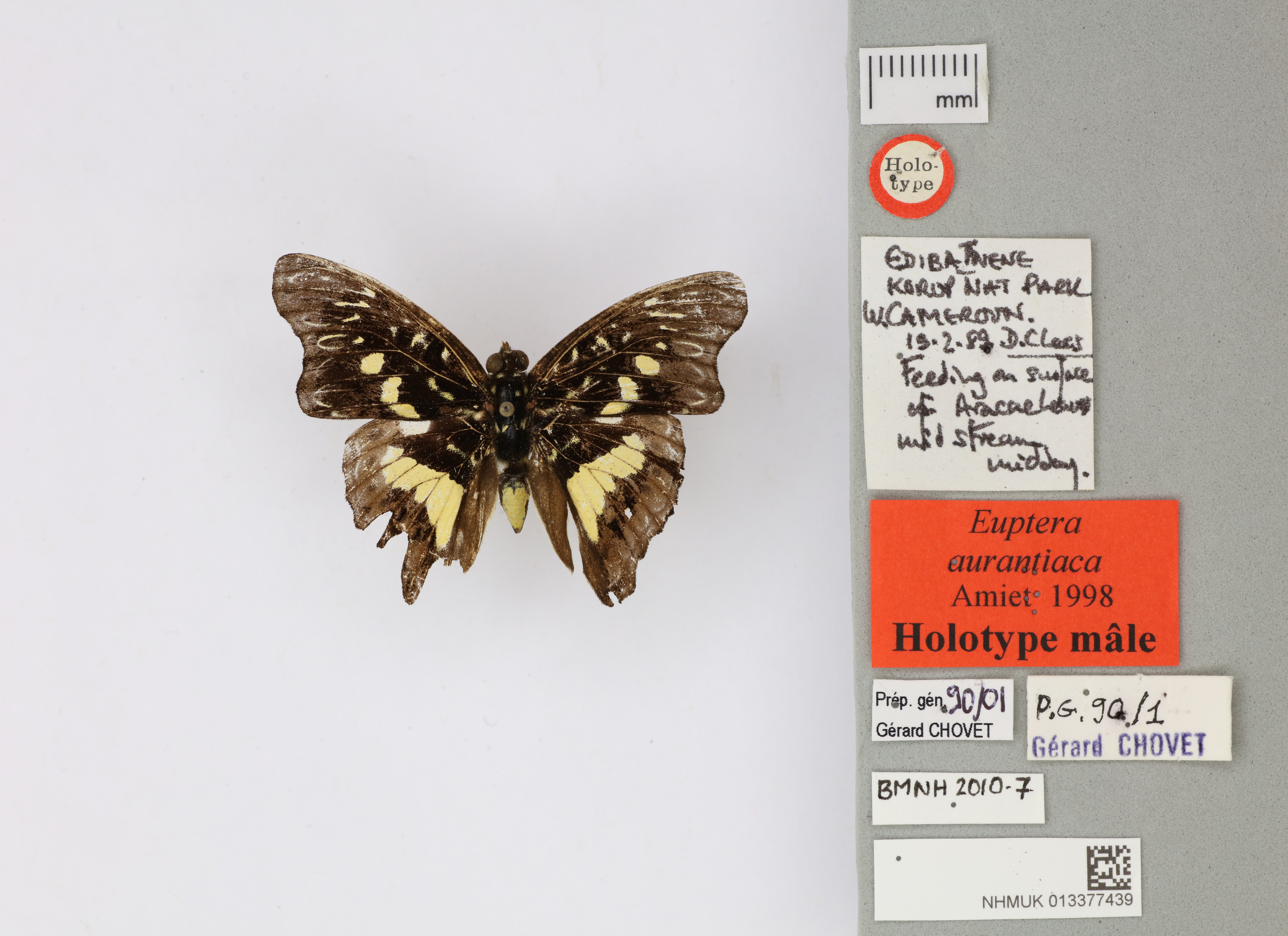

Scientific classification
- Kingdom: Animalia
- Phylum: Arthropoda
- Clade: Pancrustacea
- Class: Insecta
- Order: Lepidoptera
- Family: Nymphalidae
- Genus: Euptera
- Species: E. aurantiaca

Binomial name
- Euptera aurantiaca Amiet, 1998

= Euptera aurantiaca =

Species of butterfly

Euptera aurantiaca, the Korup euptera, is a butterfly in the family Nymphalidae. It is found in Cameroon. The habitat consists of forests.

The larvae feed on Englerophytum species.
