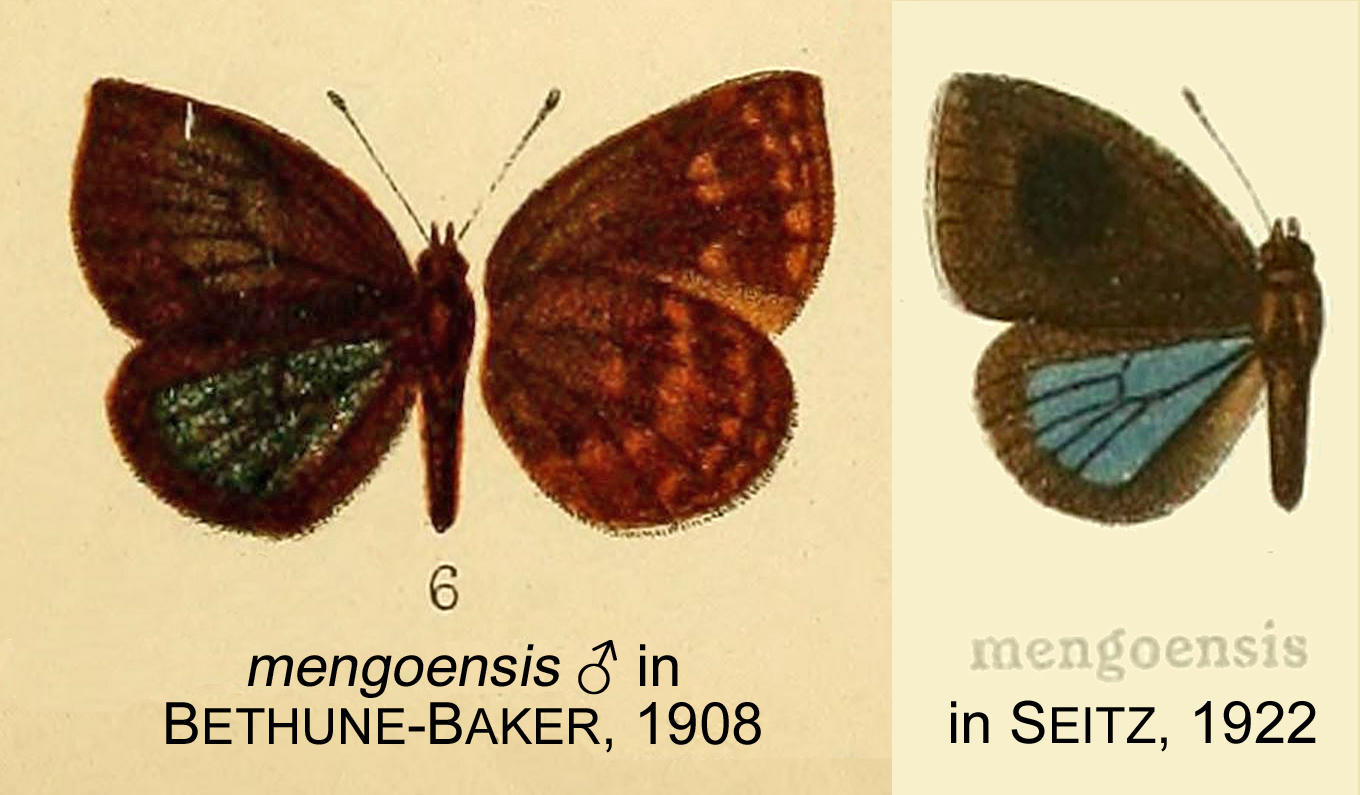

Scientific classification
- Kingdom: Animalia
- Phylum: Arthropoda
- Class: Insecta
- Order: Lepidoptera
- Family: Lycaenidae
- Genus: Cephetola
- Species: C. mengoensis

Binomial name
- Cephetola mengoensis (Bethune-Baker, 1906)

Synonyms
- Epitola mengoensis Bethune-Baker, 1906

= Cephetola mengoensis =

Species of butterfly

Cephetola mengoensis is a butterfly in the family Lycaenidae. It is found in Uganda and Kenya.

== Subspecies ==
- Cephetola mengoensis mengoensis (Uganda)
- Cephetola mengoensis kenya Libert & Collins, 1999 (Kenya: Kakamega Forest)
