= Euptera plantroui =

Scientific classification
- Domain: Eukaryota
- Kingdom: Animalia
- Phylum: Arthropoda
- Class: Insecta
- Order: Lepidoptera
- Family: Nymphalidae
- Genus: Euptera
- Species: E. plantroui

Binomial name
- Euptera plantroui Chovet & Collins, 1998

Species of butterfly

Euptera plantroui, or Plantrou's euptera, is a butterfly in the family Nymphalidae. It is found in Liberia and Cameroon. The habitat consists of forests.
