= Cephetola australis =

Scientific classification
- Kingdom: Animalia
- Phylum: Arthropoda
- Class: Insecta
- Order: Lepidoptera
- Family: Lycaenidae
- Genus: Cephetola
- Species: C. australis

Binomial name
- Cephetola australis Libert, 1999

Species of butterfly

Cephetola australis is a butterfly in the family Lycaenidae. It is found in Mozambique.
