= Euptera neptunus =

Scientific classification
- Kingdom: Animalia
- Phylum: Arthropoda
- Clade: Pancrustacea
- Class: Insecta
- Order: Lepidoptera
- Family: Nymphalidae
- Genus: Euptera
- Species: E. neptunus

Binomial name
- Euptera neptunus Joicey & Talbot, 1924

Synonyms
- Euptera pluto neptunus Joicey & Talbot, 1924

Species of butterfly

Euptera neptunus, the Neptune euptera, is a butterfly in the family Nymphalidae. It is found in eastern Nigeria, Cameroon and the Democratic Republic of the Congo (from the central and eastern part of the country to Uele, the Lindi Valley, Tshuapa, Cataractes and Sankuru). The habitat consists of forests.
