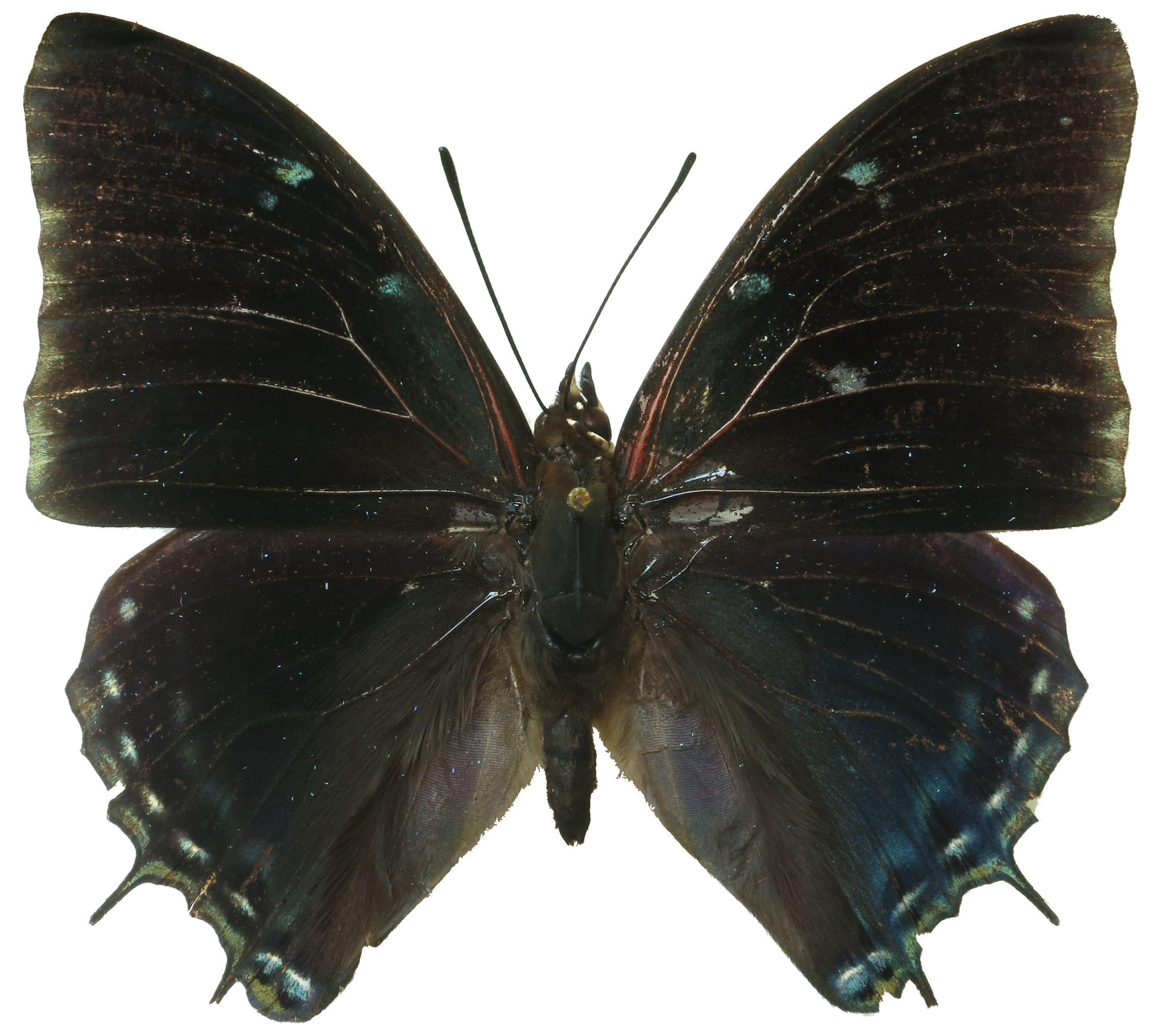
- C. v. virilis male from Cameroon

Scientific classification
- Kingdom: Animalia
- Phylum: Arthropoda
- Clade: Pancrustacea
- Class: Insecta
- Order: Lepidoptera
- Family: Nymphalidae
- Genus: Charaxes
- Species: C. virilis

Binomial name
- Charaxes virilis van Someren & Jackson, 1952

Synonyms
- Charaxes etheocles f. virilis Rothschild, 1900; Charaxes virilis f. blandini Minig, 1976; Charaxes virilis f. blandini Henning, 1989; Charaxes etheocles f. lenis Jordan, 1929

= Charaxes virilis =

Species of butterfly

Charaxes virilis, the blue demon charaxes, is a butterfly in the family Nymphalidae. It is found in Guinea, Sierra Leone, Burkina Faso, Ivory Coast, Ghana, Nigeria, Cameroon, the Republic of the Congo, the Central African Republic, the Democratic Republic of the Congo and Uganda. The habitat consists of lowland evergreen forests and forest/savanna mosaic.

The larvae feed on Adenanthera pavonina, Griffonia simplicifolia, Cathormium, Dalbergia, Entada and Tetrapleura species.

Torben Larsen developed a species numbering system for his 2005 publication Butterflies of West Africa. The nominate subspecies is #767. The 'Larsen' numbers have since been used with permission in A Sharp Eye on Butterflies of Ghana.

== Taxonomy ==
Charaxes virilis is a member of the large species group Charaxes etheocles.

== Subspecies ==
- C. v. virilis (Guinea, Sierra Leone, southern Burkina Faso. Ivory Coast, Ghana, Nigeria, Cameroon, Congo, Central African Republic, Democratic Republic of the Congo)
- C. v. lenis Henning, 1989 (Uganda)
