= Cephetola martini =

Scientific classification
- Kingdom: Animalia
- Phylum: Arthropoda
- Class: Insecta
- Order: Lepidoptera
- Family: Lycaenidae
- Genus: Cephetola
- Species: C. martini

Binomial name
- Cephetola martini (Libert, 1998)

Synonyms
- Epitola martini Libert, 1998; Epitola carpenteri Bethune-Baker, 1922; Epitola azurea Jackson, 1962

Species of butterfly

Cephetola martini is a butterfly in the family Lycaenidae. It is found in Cameroon, Uganda and north-western Tanzania. Its habitat consists of forests.
