= Euptera mirabilis =

Scientific classification
- Kingdom: Animalia
- Phylum: Arthropoda
- Class: Insecta
- Order: Lepidoptera
- Family: Nymphalidae
- Genus: Euptera
- Species: E. mirabilis

Binomial name
- Euptera mirabilis Libert, 2005

Species of butterfly

Euptera mirabilis is a butterfly in the family Nymphalidae. It is found in the north-eastern part of the Democratic Republic of the Congo.
