= Cephetola nigra =

Bethune-Baker's epitola

Scientific classification
- Kingdom: Animalia
- Phylum: Arthropoda
- Clade: Pancrustacea
- Class: Insecta
- Order: Lepidoptera
- Family: Lycaenidae
- Genus: Cephetola
- Species: C. nigra

Binomial name
- Cephetola nigra (Bethune-Baker, 1903)

Synonyms
- Epitola nigra Bethune-Baker, 1903

Species of butterfly

Cephetola nigra, the Bethune-Baker's epitola, is a butterfly in the family Lycaenidae. It is found in Sierra Leone, Ivory Coast, Nigeria (the Cross River loop), Cameroon, the Democratic Republic of the Congo and Uganda. Its habitat consists of forests.
