= Cephetola rileyi =

Scientific classification
- Kingdom: Animalia
- Phylum: Arthropoda
- Clade: Pancrustacea
- Class: Insecta
- Order: Lepidoptera
- Family: Lycaenidae
- Genus: Cephetola
- Species: C. rileyi

Binomial name
- Cephetola rileyi (Audeoud, 1936)

Synonyms
- Epitola rileyi Audeoud, 1936

Species of butterfly

Cephetola rileyi is a butterfly in the family Lycaenidae. It is found in Cameroon.
