= Cephetola peteri =

Scientific classification
- Kingdom: Animalia
- Phylum: Arthropoda
- Class: Insecta
- Order: Lepidoptera
- Family: Lycaenidae
- Genus: Cephetola
- Species: C. peteri

Binomial name
- Cephetola peteri (Kielland & Congdon, 1998)

Synonyms
- Epitola peteri Kielland & Congdon, 1998

Species of butterfly

Cephetola peteri is a butterfly in the family Lycaenidae. It is found in Kenya and north-western Tanzania.
