= Cephetola ducarmei =

Scientific classification
- Kingdom: Animalia
- Phylum: Arthropoda
- Class: Insecta
- Order: Lepidoptera
- Family: Lycaenidae
- Genus: Cephetola
- Species: C. ducarmei

Binomial name
- Cephetola ducarmei Libert, 1999

Species of butterfly

Cephetola ducarmei is a butterfly in the family Lycaenidae. It is found in the Democratic Republic of the Congo.
