= Euptera richelmanni =

Scientific classification
- Kingdom: Animalia
- Phylum: Arthropoda
- Class: Insecta
- Order: Lepidoptera
- Family: Nymphalidae
- Genus: Euptera
- Species: E. richelmanni

Binomial name
- Euptera richelmanni Weymer, 1907

Species of butterfly

Euptera richelmanni is a butterfly in the family Nymphalidae. It is found in Cameroon.
