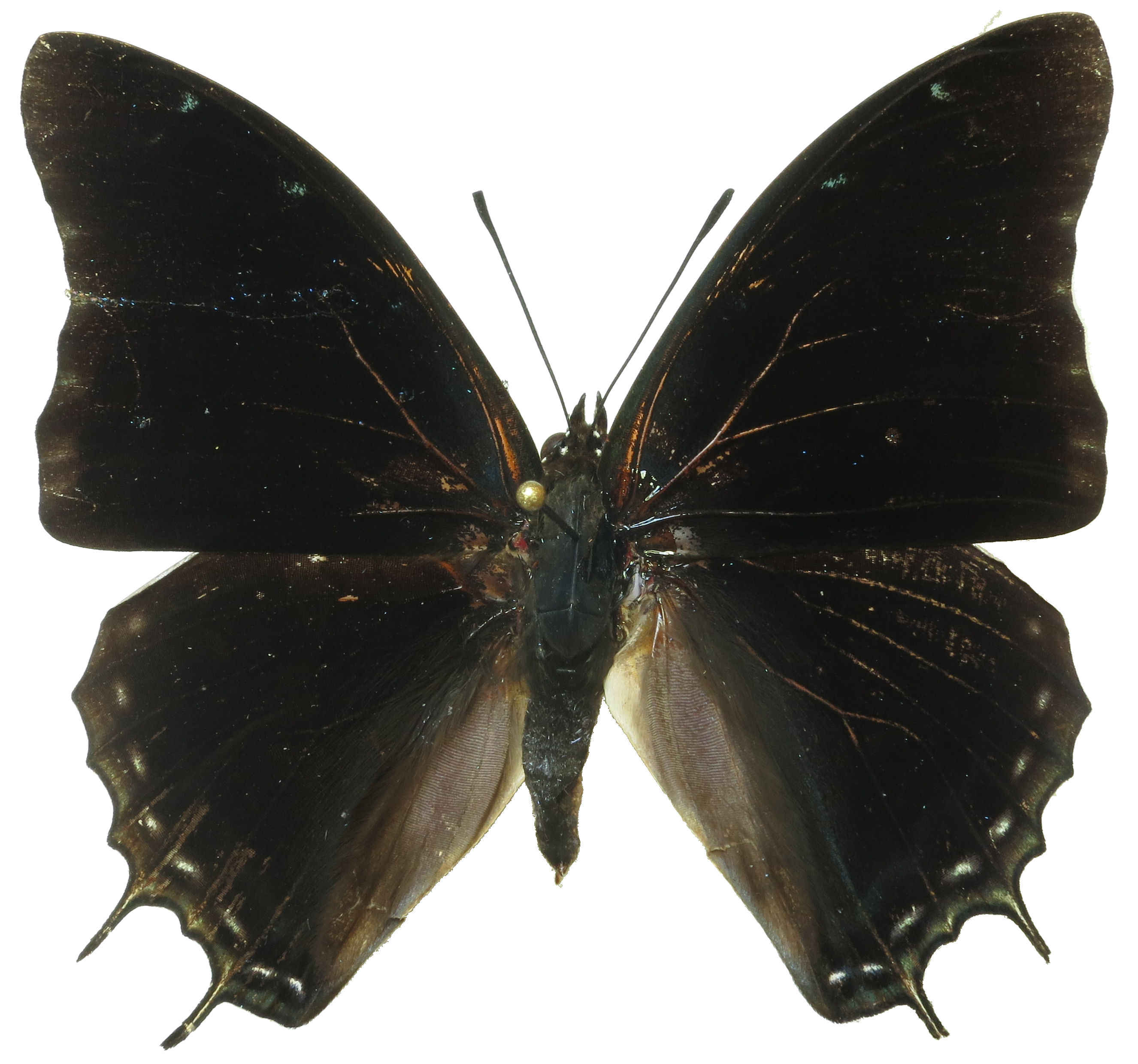

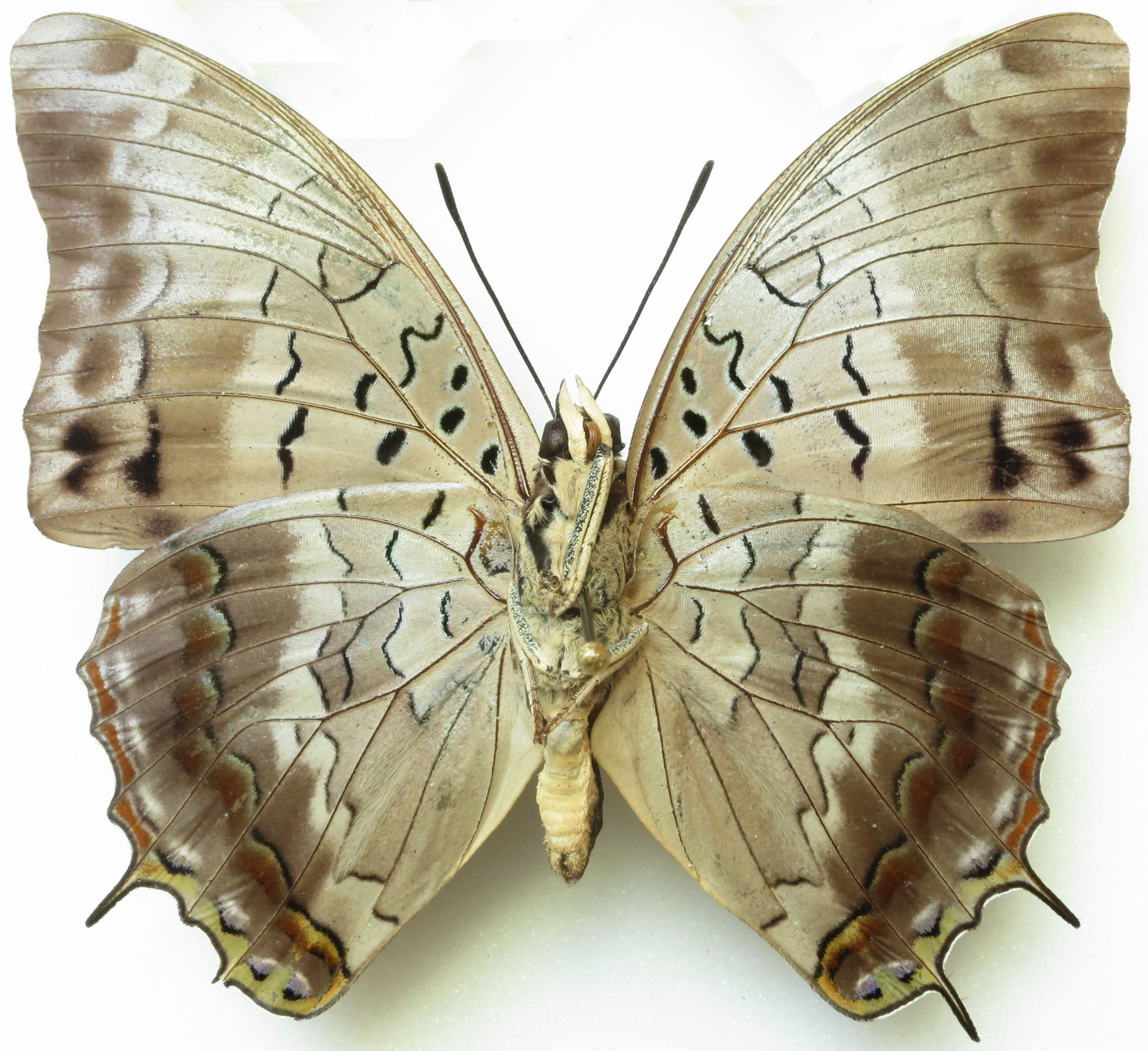
- Male from the CAR - dorsal and ventral views

Conservation status
- Least Concern (IUCN 3.1)

Scientific classification
- Kingdom: Animalia
- Phylum: Arthropoda
- Class: Insecta
- Order: Lepidoptera
- Family: Nymphalidae
- Genus: Charaxes
- Species: C. catachrous

Binomial name
- Charaxes catachrous Van Someren & Jackson, 1952

Synonyms
- Charaxes ephyra ab. catochrous Staudinger, 1896; Charaxes etheocles biinclinata van Someren, 1969

= Charaxes catachrous =

Species of butterfly

Charaxes catachrous, the silvery demon charaxes, is a butterfly in the family Nymphalidae. It is found in Nigeria, Cameroon, the Republic of the Congo, the Central African Republic, the Democratic Republic of the Congo, Uganda, north-western Tanzania and Zambia. The habitat consists of wet riverine and swamp forests.

The larvae feed on Scutia myrtina.

== Taxonomy ==
Charaxes catachrous is a member of the Charaxes etheocles species group. It is similar to Charaxes grahamei on the underside, but a smaller insect.

== External images ==
- Charaxes catochrous images at Consortium for the Barcode of Life
- Images of C. catachrous Royal Museum for Central Africa (Albertine Rift Project)
- African Butterfly Database Range map via search
