= Euptera zowa =

Scientific classification
- Kingdom: Animalia
- Phylum: Arthropoda
- Clade: Pancrustacea
- Class: Insecta
- Order: Lepidoptera
- Family: Nymphalidae
- Genus: Euptera
- Species: E. zowa

Binomial name
- Euptera zowa Fox, 1965

Synonyms
- Euptera pluto zowa Fox, 1965

Species of butterfly

Euptera zowa, or Fox's euptera, is a butterfly in the family Nymphalidae. It is found in Sierra Leone, Liberia, Ivory Coast, Ghana, Togo and Nigeria. The habitat consists of forests.

Adult males mud-puddle.

Torben Larsen developed a species numbering system for his 2005 publication Butterflies of West Africa. This species is #1124. The 'Larsen' numbers have since been used with permission in A Sharp Eye on Butterflies of Ghana.
