= Cephetola dolorosa =

Scientific classification
- Kingdom: Animalia
- Phylum: Arthropoda
- Class: Insecta
- Order: Lepidoptera
- Family: Lycaenidae
- Genus: Cephetola
- Species: C. dolorosa

Binomial name
- Cephetola dolorosa (Roche, 1954)

Synonyms
- Epitola dolorosa Roche, 1954

Species of butterfly

Cephetola dolorosa is a butterfly in the family Lycaenidae. It is found in Sudan and Uganda. Its habitat consists of forests.
