= Euptera nigeriensis =

Scientific classification
- Domain: Eukaryota
- Kingdom: Animalia
- Phylum: Arthropoda
- Class: Insecta
- Order: Lepidoptera
- Family: Nymphalidae
- Genus: Euptera
- Species: E. nigeriensis

Binomial name
- Euptera nigeriensis Chovet, 1998

Species of butterfly

Euptera nigeriensis, the Nigerian euptera, is a butterfly in the family Nymphalidae. It is found in Nigeria. The habitat consists of forests.
