= Euptera ituriensis =

Scientific classification
- Kingdom: Animalia
- Phylum: Arthropoda
- Class: Insecta
- Order: Lepidoptera
- Family: Nymphalidae
- Genus: Euptera
- Species: E. ituriensis

Binomial name
- Euptera ituriensis Libert, 1998

Species of butterfly

Euptera ituriensis is a butterfly in the family Nymphalidae. It is found in the north-eastern part of the Democratic Republic of the Congo.
