= Cephetola subgriseata =

Scientific classification
- Kingdom: Animalia
- Phylum: Arthropoda
- Class: Insecta
- Order: Lepidoptera
- Family: Lycaenidae
- Genus: Cephetola
- Species: C. subgriseata

Binomial name
- Cephetola subgriseata (Jackson, 1964)

Synonyms
- Epitola subgriseata Jackson, 1964

Species of butterfly

Cephetola subgriseata is a butterfly in the family Lycaenidae. It is found in Cameroon, the Central African Republic, the Democratic Republic of the Congo, Uganda and Tanzania.
