= Euptera liberti =

Scientific classification
- Domain: Eukaryota
- Kingdom: Animalia
- Phylum: Arthropoda
- Class: Insecta
- Order: Lepidoptera
- Family: Nymphalidae
- Genus: Euptera
- Species: E. liberti

Binomial name
- Euptera liberti Collins, 1987

Species of butterfly

Euptera liberti is a butterfly in the family Nymphalidae. It is found in Cameroon (south of Yaoundé) and the north-eastern part of the Democratic Republic of the Congo.

The larvae feed on Tetrapleura thoningii.
