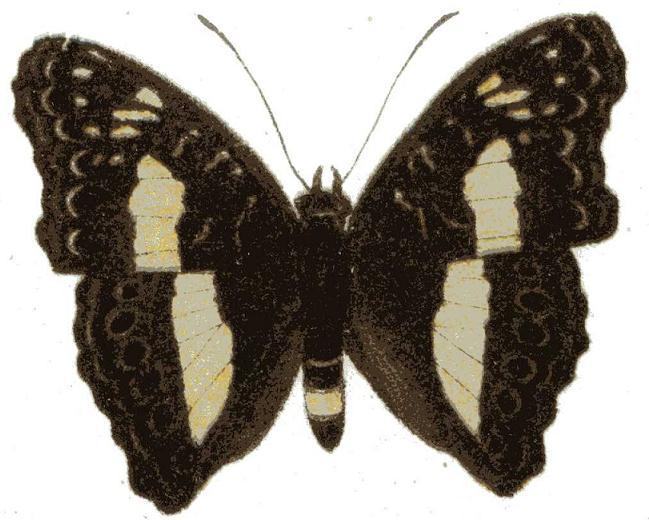

Scientific classification
- Domain: Eukaryota
- Kingdom: Animalia
- Phylum: Arthropoda
- Class: Insecta
- Order: Lepidoptera
- Family: Nymphalidae
- Genus: Euptera
- Species: E. kinugnana

Binomial name
- Euptera kinugnana (Grose-Smith, 1889)

Synonyms
- Euryphene kinugnana Grose-Smith, 1889; Euptera pluto kinugnana; Pseudacraea uhelda Mabille, 1890; Euptera pluto kinugnana f. rufa Joicey and Talbot, 1921; Euptera pluto kinugnana f. mckayi Gifford, 1965

= Euptera kinugnana =

Species of butterfly

Euptera kinugnana is a butterfly in the family Nymphalidae. It is found in Kenya, Tanzania, Malawi, Mozambique and on Madagascar. The habitat consists of forests.

Adults feed on flowers as well as fermented fruit. They are on wing from August to December and from April to May.

The larvae feed on Bequaertiodendron natalense.

== Subspecies ==
- Euptera kinugnana kinugnana (Kenya, Tanzania, Malawi, Mozambique)
- Euptera kinugnana insularis Collins, 1995 (Madagascar)
