= Cephetola =

Scientific classification
- Kingdom: Animalia
- Phylum: Arthropoda
- Class: Insecta
- Order: Lepidoptera
- Family: Lycaenidae
- Tribe: Liptenini
- Genus: Cephetola; Libert, 1999

Genus of butterflies

Cephetola is a genus of butterflies in the family Lycaenidae. All species are endemic to the Afrotropical realm.

== Species ==
- Cephetola aureliae Libert, 1999
- Cephetola australis Libert, 1999
- Cephetola barnsi Libert, 1999
- Cephetola bwamba (Jackson, 1964)
- Cephetola catuna (Kirby, 1890)
- Cephetola cephena (Hewitson, 1873)
- Cephetola chari Libert & Collins, 1999
- Cephetola collinsi Libert & Larsen, 1999
- Cephetola dolorosa (Roche, 1954)
- Cephetola ducarmei Libert, 1999
- Cephetola eliasis (Kielland & Congdon, 1998)
- Cephetola epitolina Libert & Collins, 1999
- Cephetola gerdae (Kielland & Libert, 1998)
- Cephetola ghesquierei (Roche, 1954)
- Cephetola godarti Libert & Collins, 1999
- Cephetola izidori (Kielland & Congdon, 1998)
- Cephetola kakamegae Libert & Collins, 1999
- Cephetola kamengensis (Jackson, 1962)
- Cephetola karinae Bouyer & Libert, 1999
- Cephetola katerae (Jackson, 1962)
- Cephetola kiellandi (Libert & Congdon, 1998)
- Cephetola maculata (Hawker-Smith, 1926)
- Cephetola maesseni Libert, 1999
- Cephetola marci Collins & Libert, 1999
- Cephetola mariae Libert, 1999
- Cephetola martini (Libert, 1998)
- Cephetola mengoensis (Bethune-Baker, 1906)
- Cephetola mercedes (Suffert, 1904)
- Cephetola mpangensis (Jackson, 1962)
- Cephetola nigeriae (Jackson, 1962)
- Cephetola nigra (Bethune-Baker, 1903)
- Cephetola obscura (Hawker-Smith, 1933)
- Cephetola orientalis (Roche, 1954)
- Cephetola oubanguensis Libert & Collins, 1999
- Cephetola ouesso (Jackson, 1962)
- Cephetola overlaeti Libert, 1999
- Cephetola peteri (Kielland & Congdon, 1998)
- Cephetola pinodes (Druce, 1890)
- Cephetola quentini Bouyer & Libert, 1999
- Cephetola rileyi (Audeoud, 1936)
- Cephetola subcoerulea (Roche, 1954)
- Cephetola subgriseata (Jackson, 1964)
- Cephetola sublustris (Bethune-Baker, 1904)
- Cephetola tanzaniensis Libert, 1999
- Cephetola vinalli (Talbot, 1935)
- Cephetola viridana (Joicey & Talbot, 1921)
