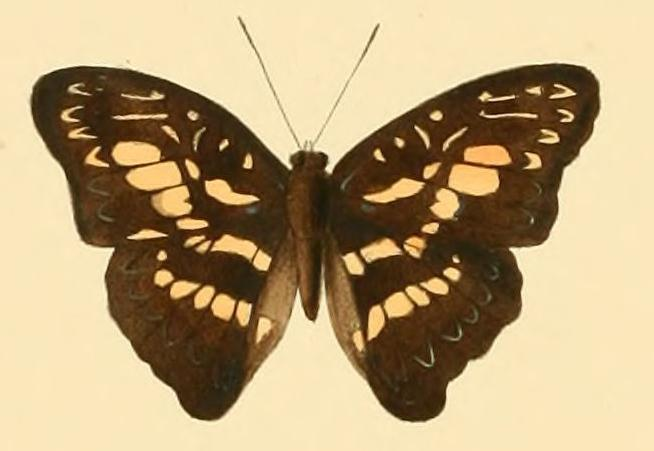
- Euptera elabontas

Scientific classification
- Domain: Eukaryota
- Kingdom: Animalia
- Phylum: Arthropoda
- Class: Insecta
- Order: Lepidoptera
- Family: Nymphalidae
- Subfamily: Limenitidinae
- Tribe: Adoliadini
- Genus: Euptera; Staudinger, 1891

Species
- Numerous, see text

= Euptera =

Genus of brush-footed butterflies

Euptera is an Afrotropical genus of brush-footed butterflies.

== Species ==
- Euptera amieti Collins & Libert, 1998
- Euptera aurantiaca Amiet, 1998
- Euptera choveti Amiet & Collins, 1998
- Euptera collinsi Chovet & Libert, 1998
- Euptera crowleyi (Kirby, 1889)
- Euptera debruynei (Hecq, 1990)
- Euptera dorothea Bethune-Baker, 1904
- Euptera ducarmei Collins, 1998
- Euptera elabontas (Hewitson, 1871)
- Euptera falcata Libert, 1998
- Euptera falsathyma Schultze, 1916
- Euptera freyja Hancock, 1984
- Euptera ginettae Libert, 2005
- Euptera hirundo Staudinger, 1891
- Euptera intricata Aurivillius, 1894
- Euptera ituriensis Libert, 1998
- Euptera kinugnana (Grose-Smith, 1889)
- Euptera knoopi Libert & Chovet, 1998
- Euptera liberti Collins, 1987
- Euptera mimetica Collins & Amiet, 1998
- Euptera mirabilis Libert, 2005
- Euptera mirifica Carpenter & Jackson, 1950
- Euptera mocquerysi Staudinger, 1893
- Euptera neptunus Joicey & Talbot, 1924
- Euptera nigeriensis Chovet, 1998
- Euptera plantroui Chovet & Collins, 1998
- Euptera pluto (Ward, 1873)
- Euptera richelmanni Weymer, 1907
- Euptera schultzei Libert & Chovet, 1998
- Euptera semirufa Joicey & Talbot, 1921
- Euptera zowa Fox, 1965
