= Euptera mimetica =

Scientific classification
- Kingdom: Animalia
- Phylum: Arthropoda
- Clade: Pancrustacea
- Class: Insecta
- Order: Lepidoptera
- Family: Nymphalidae
- Genus: Euptera
- Species: E. mimetica

Binomial name
- Euptera mimetica Collins & Amiet, 1998

Species of butterfly

Euptera mimetica, the mimetic euptera, is a butterfly in the family Nymphalidae. It is found in eastern Nigeria, western Cameroon and the Republic of the Congo. The habitat consists of forests.
