= Euptera mocquerysi =

Scientific classification
- Domain: Eukaryota
- Kingdom: Animalia
- Phylum: Arthropoda
- Class: Insecta
- Order: Lepidoptera
- Family: Nymphalidae
- Genus: Euptera
- Species: E. mocquerysi

Binomial name
- Euptera mocquerysi Staudinger, 1893

Synonyms
- Euptera sterna Staudinger, 1894

Species of butterfly

Euptera mocquerysi is a butterfly in the family Nymphalidae. It is found in Cameroon, the Republic of the Congo and Angola (Cabinda).
