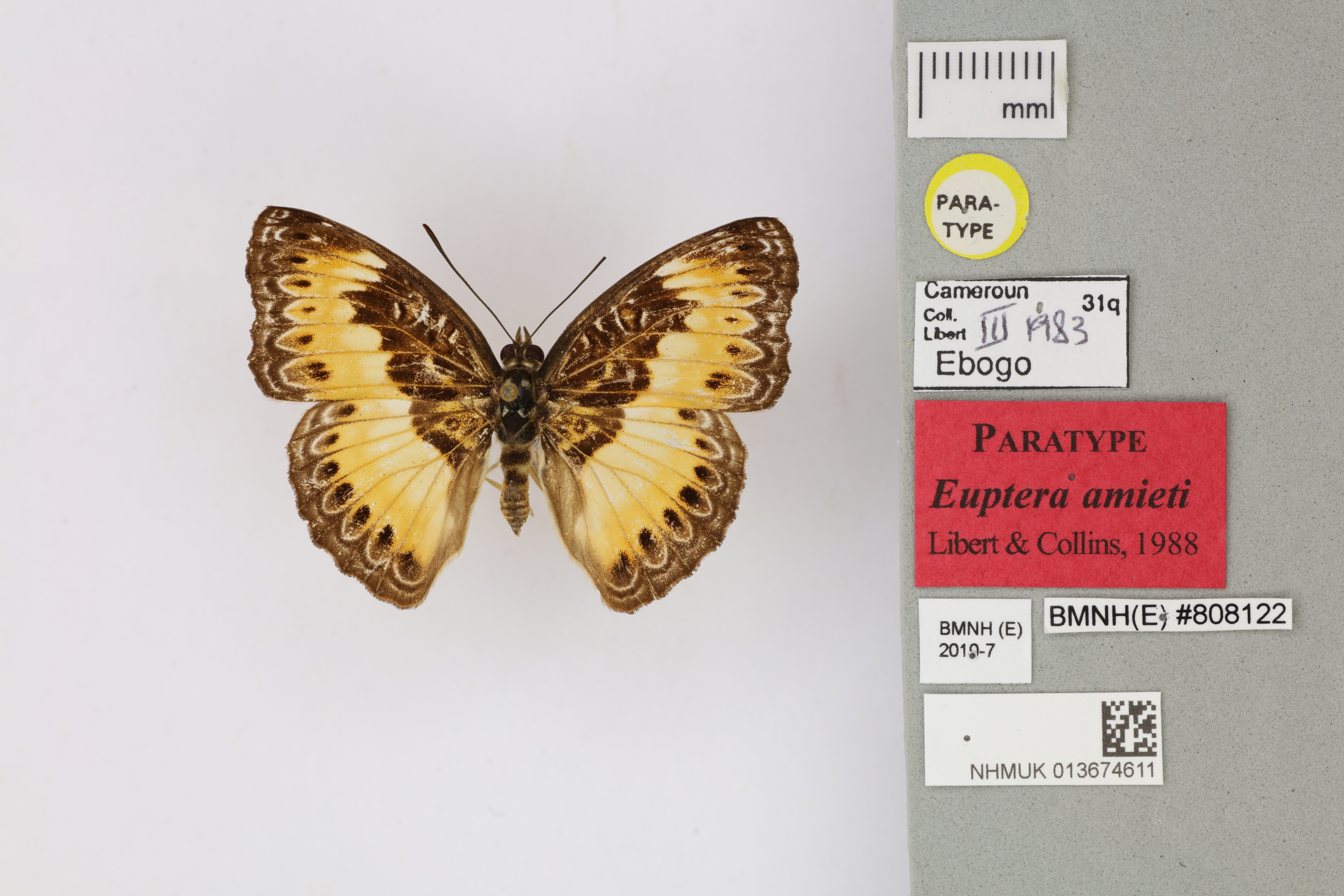

Scientific classification
- Domain: Eukaryota
- Kingdom: Animalia
- Phylum: Arthropoda
- Class: Insecta
- Order: Lepidoptera
- Family: Nymphalidae
- Genus: Euptera
- Species: E. amieti

Binomial name
- Euptera amieti Collins & Libert, 1998

= Euptera amieti =

Species of butterfly

Euptera amieti, or Amiet's euptera, is a butterfly in the family Nymphalidae. It is found in eastern Nigeria, Cameroon, Gabon and the eastern part of the Democratic Republic of the Congo. The habitat consists of forests.

The larvae feed on Englerophytum species.
