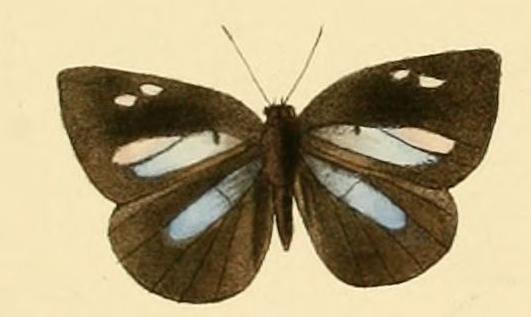

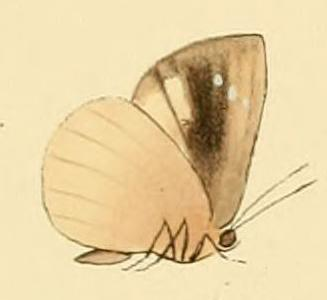

Scientific classification
- Kingdom: Animalia
- Phylum: Arthropoda
- Class: Insecta
- Order: Lepidoptera
- Family: Lycaenidae
- Genus: Cephetola
- Species: C. cephena

Binomial name
- Cephetola cephena (Hewitson, 1873)

Synonyms
- Epitola cephena Hewitson, 1873; Epitola doleta Kirby, 1890; Epitola pinodoides Grose-Smith and Kirby, 1893; Phytala leonina Bethune-Baker, 1903; Epitola leonensis Bethune-Baker, 1904; Epitola entebbeana Bethune-Baker, 1926

= Cephetola cephena =

Cephena epitola

Species of butterfly

Cephetola cephena, the cephena epitola, is a butterfly in the family Lycaenidae. It is found in Guinea, Sierra Leone, Ivory Coast, Ghana, Togo, Nigeria, Cameroon, Gabon, the Republic of the Congo, the Central African Republic, the Democratic Republic of the Congo, Uganda and Tanzania.

== Subspecies ==
- Cephetola cephena cephena (Guinea, Sierra Leone, Ivory Coast, Ghana, Togo, southern Nigeria, Cameroon, Gabon, Congo, Central African Republic, Democratic Republic of the Congo)
- Cephetola cephena entebbeana (Bethune-Baker, 1926) (eastern Democratic Republic of the Congo, Uganda, north-western Tanzania)
