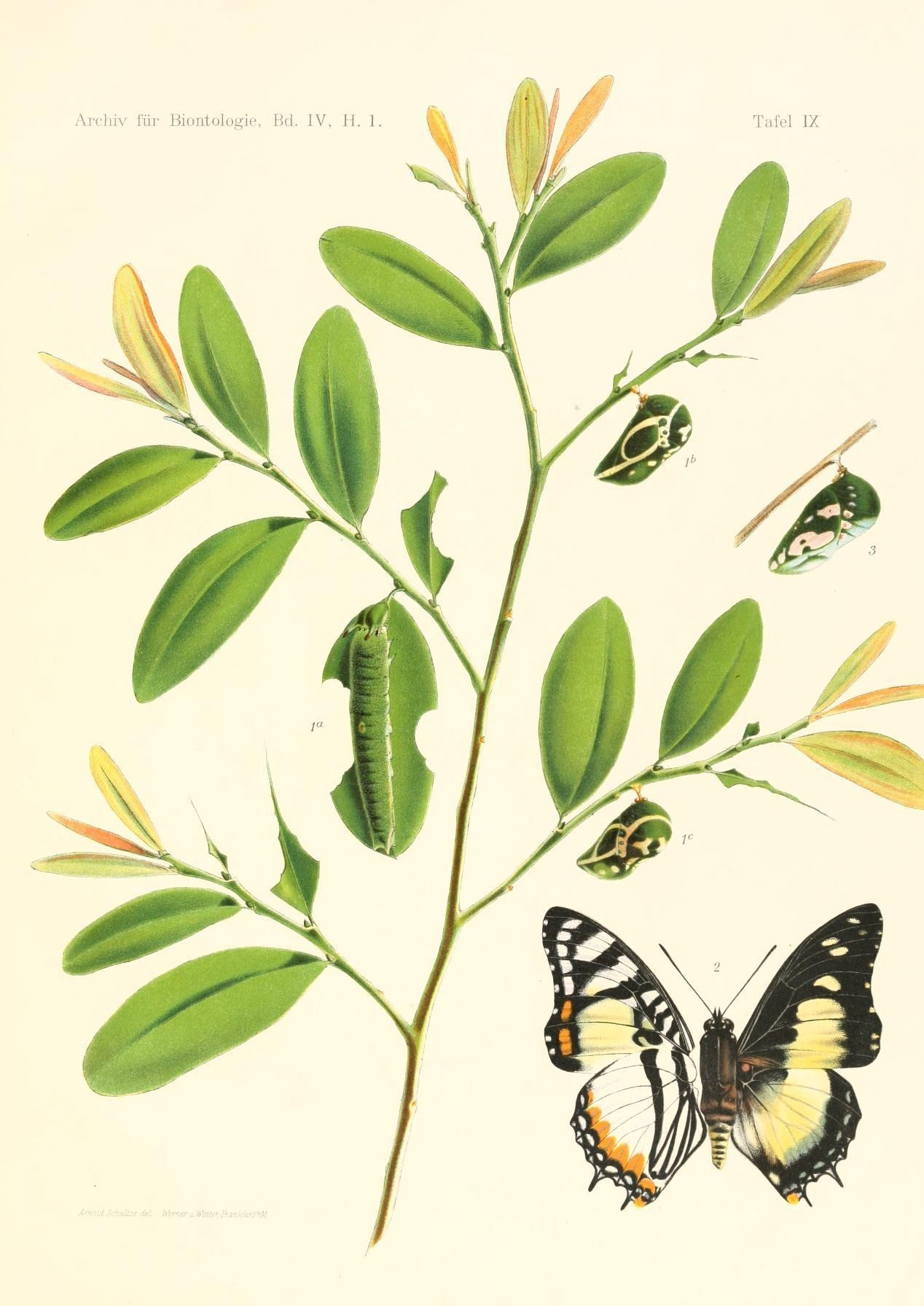

Scientific classification
- Kingdom: Animalia
- Phylum: Arthropoda
- Clade: Pancrustacea
- Class: Insecta
- Order: Lepidoptera
- Family: Nymphalidae
- Genus: Charaxes
- Species: C. superbus

Binomial name
- Charaxes superbus Schultze, 1909

= Charaxes superbus =

Species of butterfly

Charaxes superbus, the superb white charaxes, is a butterfly in the family Nymphalidae. It is found in Nigeria, Cameroon, Gabon, the north-western part of the Republic of the Congo and the Central African Republic.

== Description ==
Ch. superbus Arn. Schultze is very similar to nobilis, but differs in having the forewing narrower with the distal margin little excised, in the larger, dull sulphur-yellow marginal spots of the forewing, in the blue-grey band, up to 4 mm. in breadth, which in cellules 2-6 separates the median band of the hindwing from the black marginal band, in the larger and more complete white transverse spots in the cell of the forewing beneath, in the black, white-spotted marginal band on the underside of the hindwing, which is only half as broad as in nobilis (about 5 mm.) and is proximally bounded by an orange-yellow band 5 mm. in breadth in cellule 2, and in the white markings in the apical half of the fore wing beneath. In superbus the median band on the underside of the forewing covers the base of cellule 3 and then follows a white band, about 5 mm. in breadth, in cellules 3-6, a broad transverse spot, formed as in nobilis, in cellules 5-7 and finally before the distal margin in cellules lb-7 seven crescentic spots of uniform breadth, of which those in cellules lb and 2 are orange and the rest silvery white. Cameroons. Schultze observed this beautiful species drinking in a native latrine.

== Biology ==
The habitat consists of evergreen forests.

== Taxonomy ==
Charaxes nobilis group.

The supposed clade members are:

- Charaxes nobilis - very like next
- Charaxes superbus - very like last
