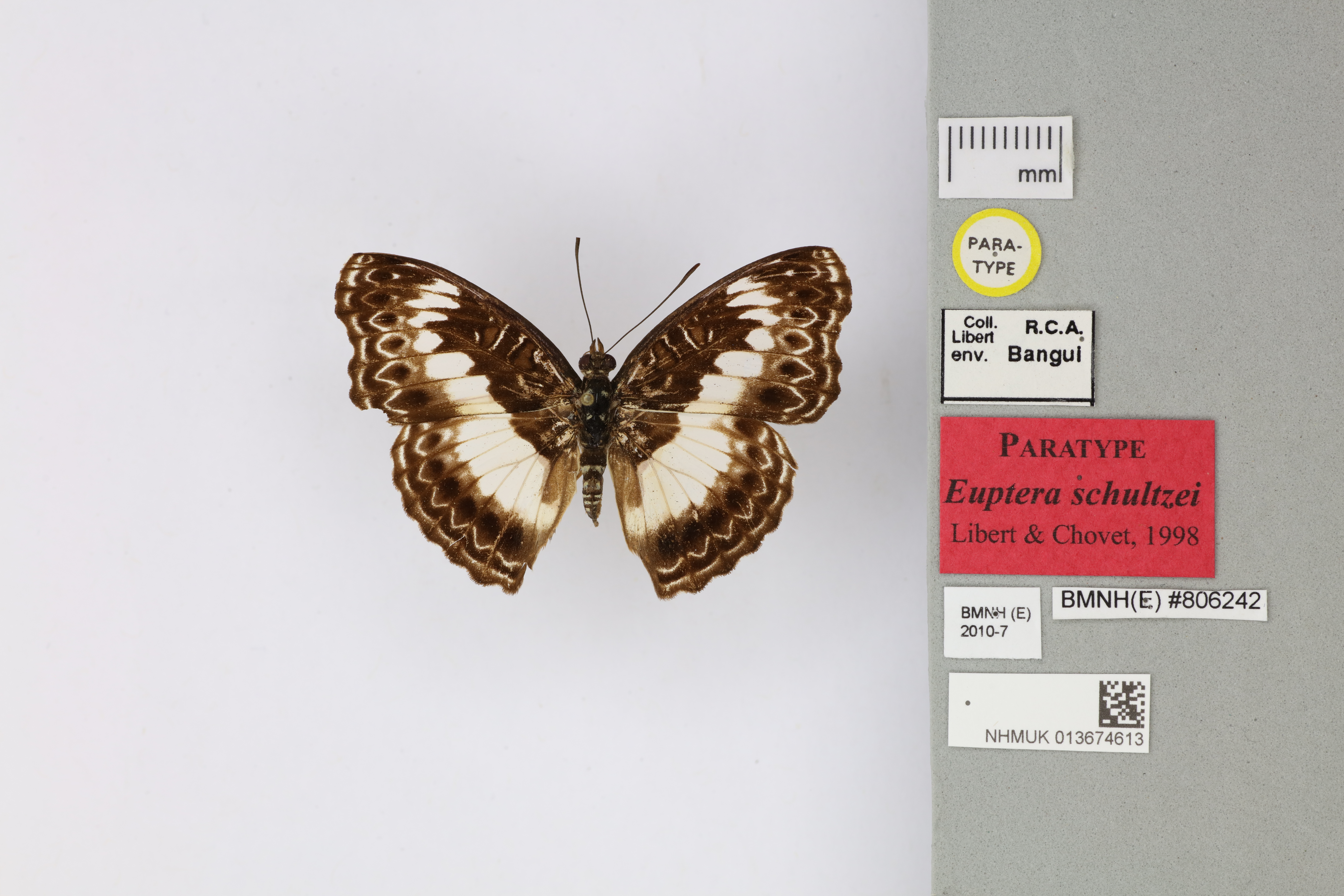

Scientific classification
- Kingdom: Animalia
- Phylum: Arthropoda
- Class: Insecta
- Order: Lepidoptera
- Family: Nymphalidae
- Genus: Euptera
- Species: E. schultzei

Binomial name
- Euptera schultzei Libert & Chovet, 1998

= Euptera schultzei =

Species of butterfly

Euptera schultzei is a butterfly in the family Nymphalidae. It is found in south-eastern Cameroon, the Central African Republic, southern Sudan and the northern and eastern parts of the Democratic Republic of the Congo.
