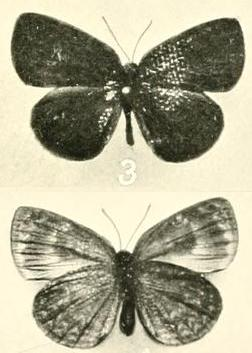

Scientific classification
- Kingdom: Animalia
- Phylum: Arthropoda
- Class: Insecta
- Order: Lepidoptera
- Family: Lycaenidae
- Genus: Cephetola
- Species: C. catuna

Binomial name
- Cephetola catuna (Kirby, 1890)

Synonyms
- Epitola catuna Kirby, 1890; Epitola mus Suffert, 1904; Epitola carpenteri Bethune-Baker, 1922

= Cephetola catuna =

Species of butterfly

Cephetola catuna is a butterfly in the family Lycaenidae. It is found in Cameroon, the Republic of the Congo, the Central African Republic, Gabon, the Democratic Republic of the Congo and Uganda. Adults females oviposit on lichens on the bark of twigs and tree trunks. The larvae are attended by ants.

== Subspecies ==
- Cephetola catuna catuna (Cameroon, Congo, Central African Republic, Gabon, Democratic Republic of the Congo, Uganda)
- Cephetola catuna carpenteri (Bethune-Baker, 1922) (Uganda)
