= Cephetola orientalis =

Scientific classification
- Kingdom: Animalia
- Phylum: Arthropoda
- Class: Insecta
- Order: Lepidoptera
- Family: Lycaenidae
- Genus: Cephetola
- Species: C. orientalis

Binomial name
- Cephetola orientalis (Roche, 1954)

Synonyms
- Epitola orientalis Roche, 1954

Species of butterfly

Cephetola orientalis is a butterfly in the family Lycaenidae. It is found in Cameroon, the Central African Republic, Gabon, the Democratic Republic of the Congo, Uganda, Tanzania north-west and western Kenya. Its habitat consists of primary forests.
