= Cephetola izidori =

Scientific classification
- Kingdom: Animalia
- Phylum: Arthropoda
- Class: Insecta
- Order: Lepidoptera
- Family: Lycaenidae
- Genus: Cephetola
- Species: C. izidori

Binomial name
- Cephetola izidori (Kielland & Congdon, 1998)

Synonyms
- Epitola izidori Kielland & Congdon, 1998

Species of butterfly

Cephetola izidori is a butterfly in the family Lycaenidae. It is found in the Central African Republic, Kenya, Tanzania and Zambia.

== Subspecies ==
- Cephetola izidori izidori (Central African Republic, Kenya, north-western Tanzania)
- Cephetola izidori zambeziae Libert & Collins, 1999 (Zambia)
