= Cephetola viridana =

Scientific classification
- Kingdom: Animalia
- Phylum: Arthropoda
- Class: Insecta
- Order: Lepidoptera
- Family: Lycaenidae
- Genus: Cephetola
- Species: C. viridana

Binomial name
- Cephetola viridana (Joicey & Talbot, 1921)

Synonyms
- Epitola viridana Joicey & Talbot, 1921; Epitola viridana radiata Bethune-Baker, 1926

Species of butterfly

Cephetola viridana is a butterfly in the family Lycaenidae. It is found in Cameroon, the Republic of the Congo, the Central African Republic, the Democratic Republic of the Congo, Uganda, Kenya, north-western Tanzania and Zambia. Its habitat consists of primary forests.
