= Cephetola mariae =

Scientific classification
- Kingdom: Animalia
- Phylum: Arthropoda
- Clade: Pancrustacea
- Class: Insecta
- Order: Lepidoptera
- Family: Lycaenidae
- Genus: Cephetola
- Species: C. mariae

Binomial name
- Cephetola mariae Libert, 1999

Species of butterfly

Cephetola mariae is a butterfly in the family Lycaenidae. It is found in Cameroon, the Central African Republic, Uganda, Kenya and Tanzania.
