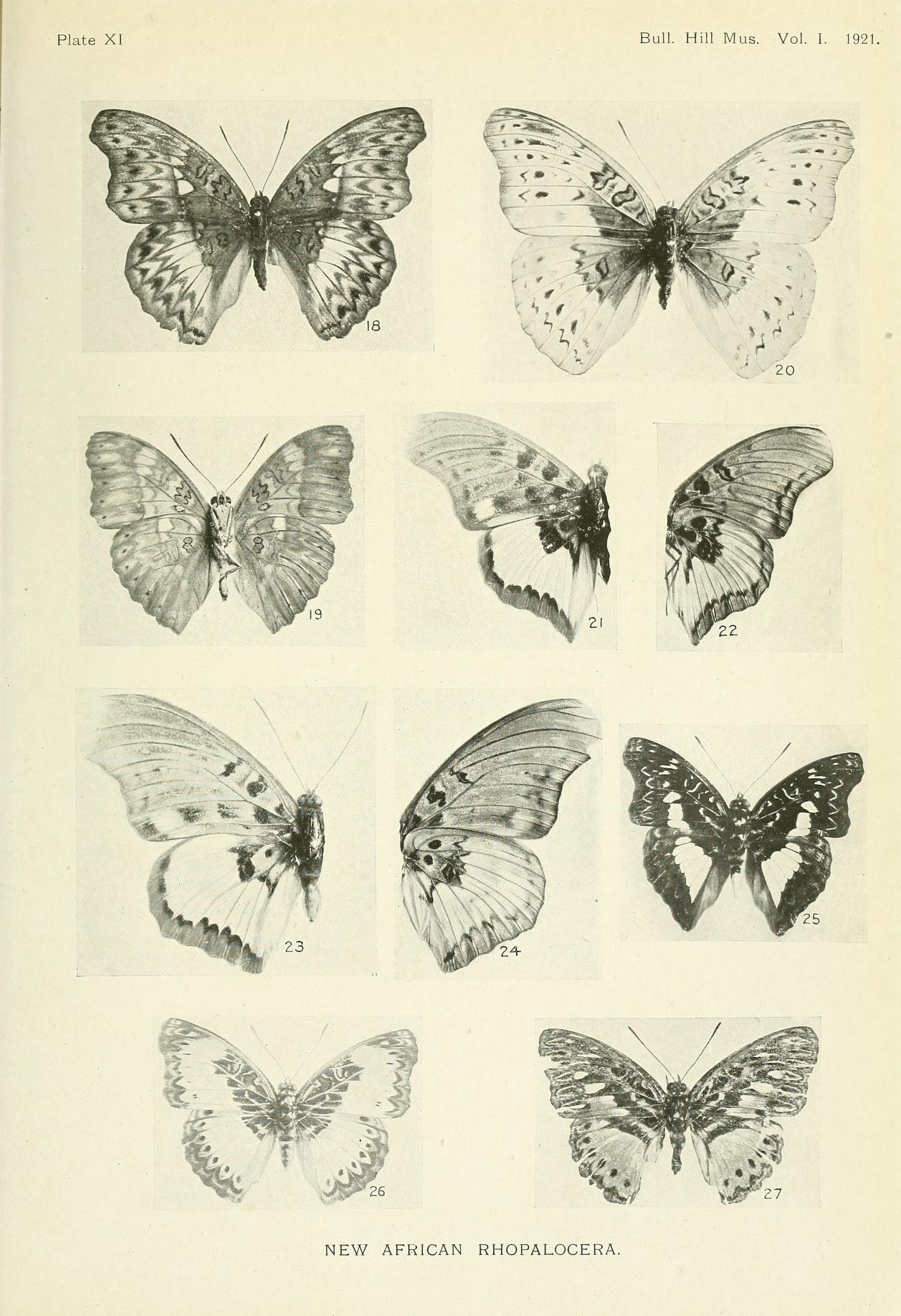
- Figure 27

Scientific classification
- Domain: Eukaryota
- Kingdom: Animalia
- Phylum: Arthropoda
- Class: Insecta
- Order: Lepidoptera
- Family: Nymphalidae
- Genus: Euptera
- Species: E. semirufa

Binomial name
- Euptera semirufa Joicey & Talbot, 1921

= Euptera semirufa =

Species of butterfly

Euptera semirufa is a butterfly in the family Nymphalidae. It is found in eastern and central Cameroon, Gabon, the Central African Republic and the Democratic Republic of the Congo (from the north-eastern part of the country to Ituri and Uele).
