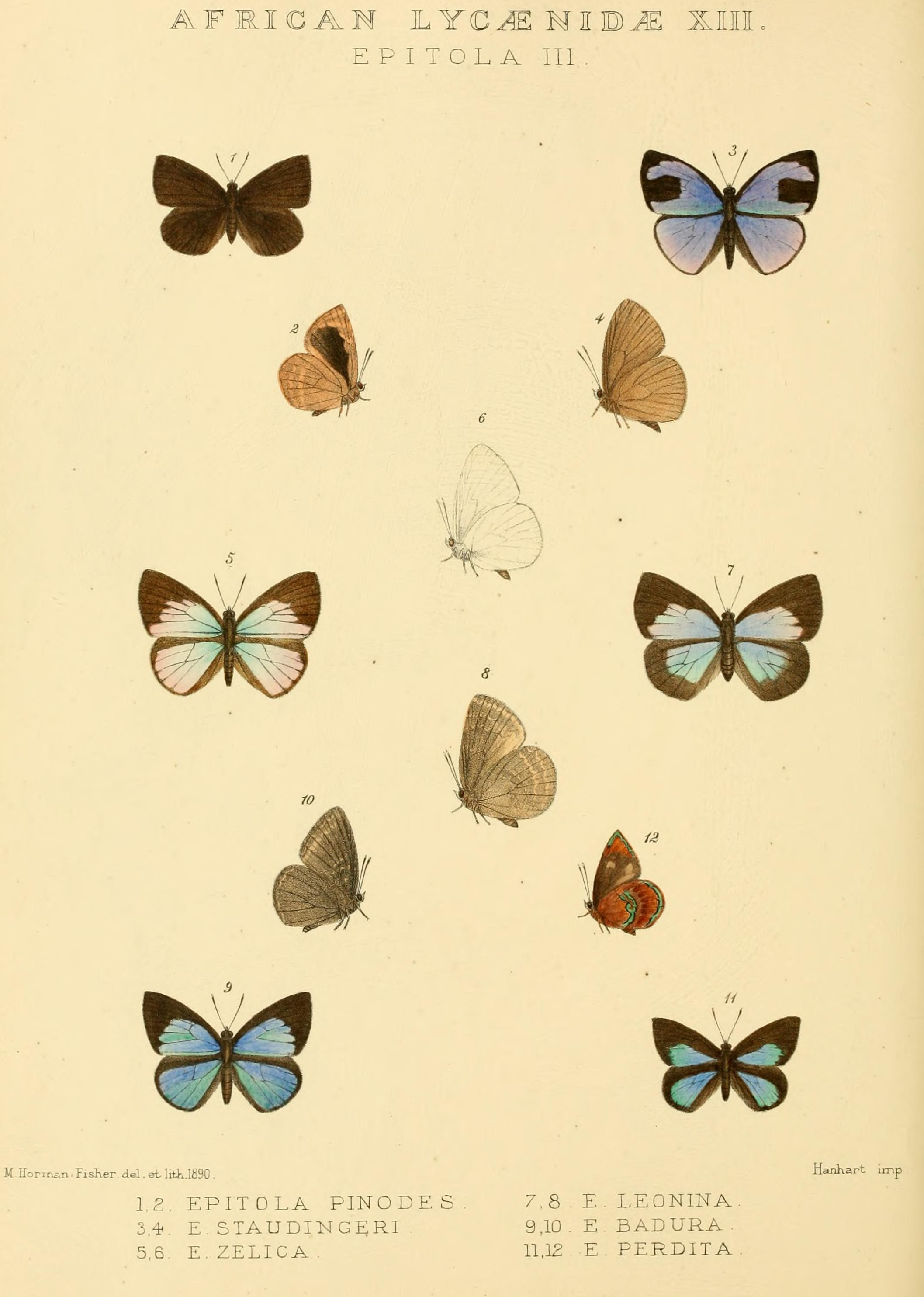

Scientific classification
- Kingdom: Animalia
- Phylum: Arthropoda
- Class: Insecta
- Order: Lepidoptera
- Family: Lycaenidae
- Genus: Cephetola
- Species: C. pinodes

Binomial name
- Cephetola pinodes (H. H. Druce, 1890)

Synonyms
- Epitola pinodes H. H. Druce, 1890; Epitola conjuncta Grose-Smith and Kirby, 1893; Epitola conjuncta budduana Talbot, 1937

= Cephetola pinodes =

Druce's epitola

Species of butterfly

Cephetola pinodes, or Druce's epitola, is a butterfly in the family Lycaenidae. The species was first described by Hamilton Herbert Druce in 1890. It is found in Sierra Leone, Ivory Coast, Ghana, Nigeria, Cameroon, the Republic of the Congo, the Central African Republic, the Democratic Republic of the Congo, Uganda and Tanzania.

== Subspecies ==
- Cephetola pinodes pinodes (Sierra Leone, Ivory Coast, Ghana, western Nigeria)
- Cephetola pinodes budduana (Talbot, 1937) (eastern Nigeria, Cameroon, Congo, Central African Republic, Democratic Republic of the Congo, Uganda, north-western Tanzania)
