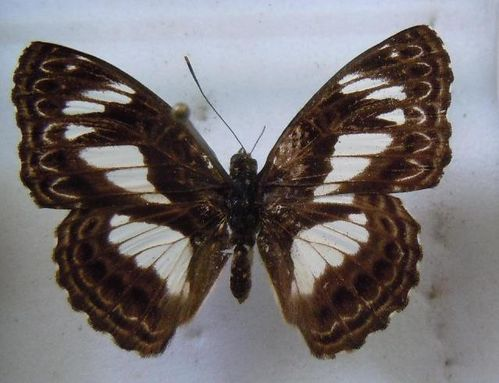

Scientific classification
- Kingdom: Animalia
- Phylum: Arthropoda
- Clade: Pancrustacea
- Class: Insecta
- Order: Lepidoptera
- Family: Nymphalidae
- Genus: Euptera
- Species: E. choveti

Binomial name
- Euptera choveti Amiet & Collins, 1998

= Euptera choveti =

Species of butterfly

Euptera choveti is a butterfly in the family Nymphalidae. It is found in Cameroon, Gabon, the Republic of the Congo, the Central African Republic and the Democratic Republic of the Congo.
