= Cephetola maculata =

Macular epitola

Scientific classification
- Kingdom: Animalia
- Phylum: Arthropoda
- Class: Insecta
- Order: Lepidoptera
- Family: Lycaenidae
- Genus: Cephetola
- Species: C. maculata

Binomial name
- Cephetola maculata (Hawker-Smith, 1926)

Synonyms
- Epitola maculata Hawker-Smith, 1926; Phytala pulchra Jackson, 1964

Species of butterfly

Cephetola maculata, the macular epitola, is a butterfly in the family Lycaenidae. It is found in Ivory Coast, the Republic of the Congo, the Central African Republic, the Democratic Republic of the Congo and Uganda.
