= Cephetola kiellandi =

Scientific classification
- Kingdom: Animalia
- Phylum: Arthropoda
- Class: Insecta
- Order: Lepidoptera
- Family: Lycaenidae
- Genus: Cephetola
- Species: C. kiellandi

Binomial name
- Cephetola kiellandi (Libert & Congdon, 1998)

Synonyms
- Epitola kiellandi Libert & Congdon, 1998

Species of butterfly

Cephetola kiellandi is a butterfly in the family Lycaenidae. It is found in the Central African Republic, the Democratic Republic of the Congo, Uganda and north-western Tanzania.
