= Cephetola ghesquierei =

Scientific classification
- Kingdom: Animalia
- Phylum: Arthropoda
- Class: Insecta
- Order: Lepidoptera
- Family: Lycaenidae
- Genus: Cephetola
- Species: C. ghesquierei

Binomial name
- Cephetola ghesquierei (Roche, 1954)

Synonyms
- Epitola ghesquierei Roche, 1954

Species of butterfly

Cephetola ghesquierei is a butterfly in the family Lycaenidae. It is found in Cameroon, the Republic of the Congo, the Central African Republic and the Democratic Republic of the Congo.
