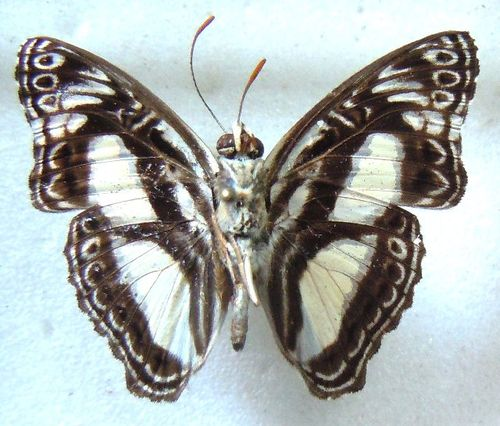

Scientific classification
- Kingdom: Animalia
- Phylum: Arthropoda
- Class: Insecta
- Order: Lepidoptera
- Family: Nymphalidae
- Genus: Euptera
- Species: E. falsathyma

Binomial name
- Euptera falsathyma Schultze, 1916

= Euptera falsathyma =

Species of butterfly

Euptera falsathyma is a butterfly in the family Nymphalidae. It is found in Cameroon, Gabon, the Republic of the Congo, the Central African Republic and the north-eastern part of the Democratic Republic of the Congo.
