= Euptera ducarmei =

Scientific classification
- Domain: Eukaryota
- Kingdom: Animalia
- Phylum: Arthropoda
- Class: Insecta
- Order: Lepidoptera
- Family: Nymphalidae
- Genus: Euptera
- Species: E. ducarmei

Binomial name
- Euptera ducarmei Collins, 1998

Species of butterfly

Euptera ducarmei is a butterfly in the family Nymphalidae. It is found in the north-eastern part of the Democratic Republic of the Congo and the Central African Republic.
