= Euptera collinsi =

Scientific classification
- Domain: Eukaryota
- Kingdom: Animalia
- Phylum: Arthropoda
- Class: Insecta
- Order: Lepidoptera
- Family: Nymphalidae
- Genus: Euptera
- Species: E. collinsi

Binomial name
- Euptera collinsi Chovet & Libert, 1998

Species of butterfly

Euptera collinsi is a butterfly in the family Nymphalidae. It is found in the Central African Republic.
