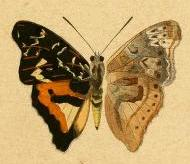

Scientific classification
- Kingdom: Animalia
- Phylum: Arthropoda
- Class: Insecta
- Order: Lepidoptera
- Family: Nymphalidae
- Genus: Euptera
- Species: E. crowleyi

Binomial name
- Euptera crowleyi (Kirby, 1889)

Synonyms
- Euphaedra crowleyi Kirby, 1889; Euptera sirene Staudinger, 1891; Euptera innupta St Leger, 1969

= Euptera crowleyi =

Species of butterfly

Euptera crowleyi, or Crowley's euptera, is a butterfly in the family Nymphalidae. It is found in Ivory Coast, Ghana, Togo, Nigeria, Cameroon, the Republic of the Congo, the Central African Republic and the Democratic Republic of the Congo. The habitat consists of drier forests and wet forests.

The larvae feed on Pachystela brevipes and Englerophytum oubanguiense.

== Subspecies ==
- Euptera crowleyi crowleyi (Ivory Coast, Ghana, Togo, Nigeria, western Cameroon)
- Euptera crowleyi centralis Libert, 1995 (Cameroon, Congo, Central African Republic, Congo, Democratic Republic of the Congo: north to Mayumbe, Equateur, Uele and Tshopo)
