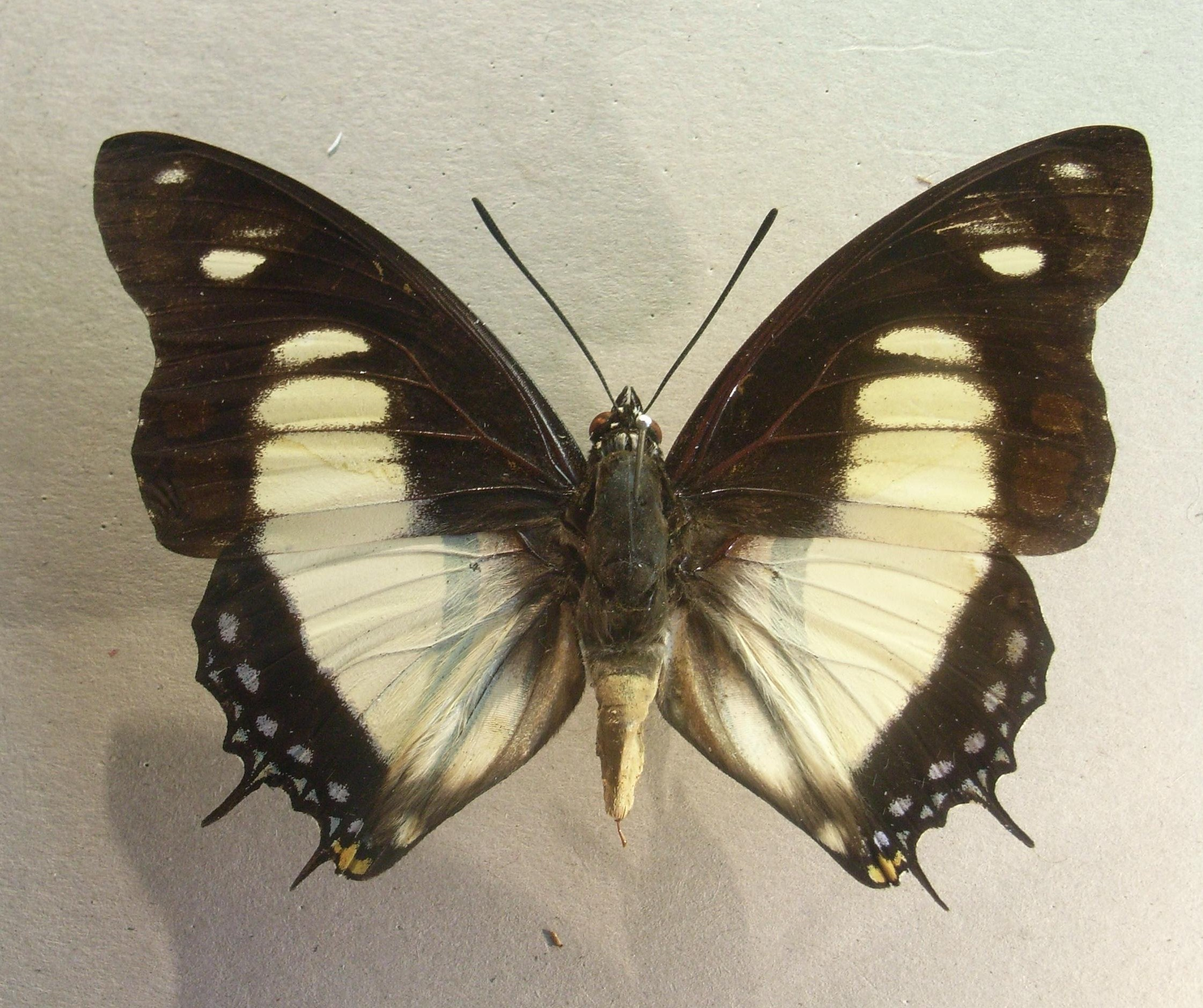

Scientific classification
- Kingdom: Animalia
- Phylum: Arthropoda
- Clade: Pancrustacea
- Class: Insecta
- Order: Lepidoptera
- Family: Nymphalidae
- Genus: Charaxes
- Species: C. nobilis

Binomial name
- Charaxes nobilis H. Druce, 1873.

Synonyms
- Charaxes agabo Distant, 1880; Charaxes homerus Staudinger, 1891

= Charaxes nobilis =

Species of butterfly

Charaxes nobilis, the noble white charaxes, is a butterfly in the family Nymphalidae. The species was first described by Herbert Druce in 1873. It is found in Guinea, Ivory Coast, Ghana, Nigeria, Cameroon, Gabon, the Republic of the Congo, the Central African Republic, the Democratic Republic of the Congo and Uganda.

== Description ==
Ch. nobilis Druce male: wings above black with a common cream-coloured median band, on the hindwing very broad (about 20 mm.), on the forewing gradually narrowed and terminating in cellule 3 in a free spot; the forewing in addition with a light yellow spot in cellules 5 and 7; the black marginal band of the hindwing about 9 mm. in breadth, with blue submarginal spots and marginal streaks and an orange-yellow anal spot; hindwing beneath with three thick, curved, black transverse lines beyond the middle, enclosing three rows of white spots, the middle one composed of large, the others of streak-like spots; at the anal angle a large orange-yellow spot enclosing two black eye-spots with bluish pupils. The female differs in having the median band on the upper surface much broader (on the hindwing 23–25 mm., on the forewing in cellule 2 19–20 mm.) and almost white, and bears in addition an elongate white spot in cellule 6 on the forewing above. Old Calabar, Cameroons, Congo; everywhere rare.

== Biology ==
The habitat consists of lowland evergreen forests. Notes on the biology of nobilis are given by Schultze (1916) and Larsen (2005).

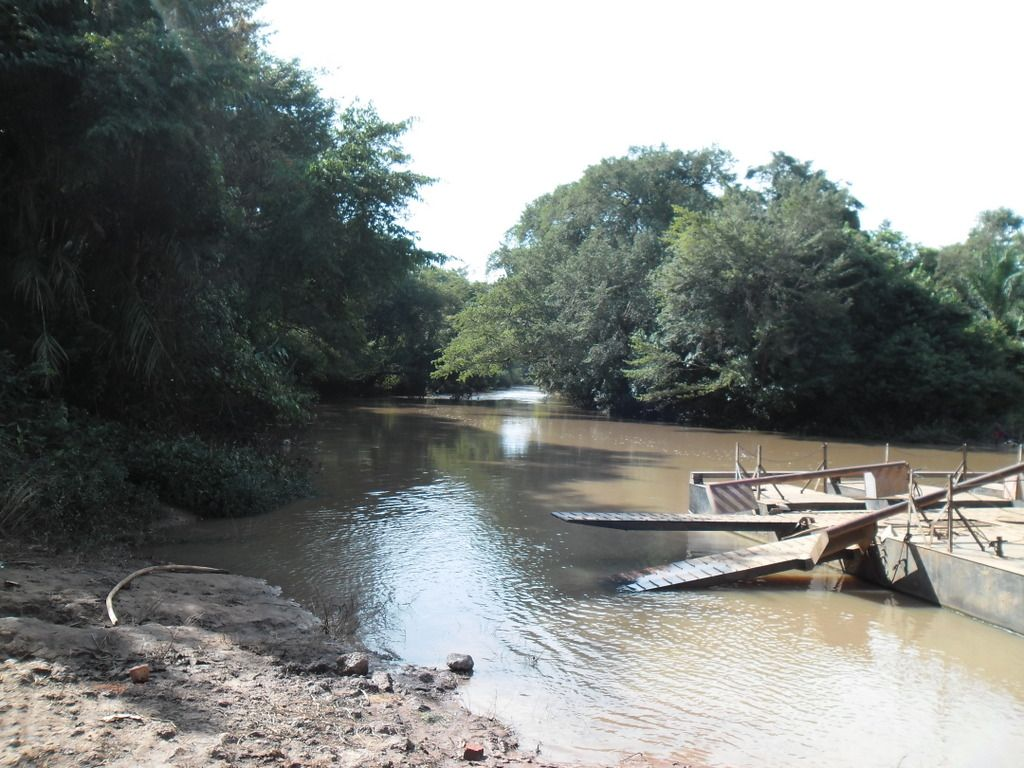
Lowland forest habitat in the Central African Republic

== Subspecies ==
- Charaxes nobilis nobilis (southern and eastern Nigeria, Cameroon, Gabon, Congo, Central African Republic, Democratic Republic of the Congo, Uganda)
- Charaxes nobilis claudei le Moult, 1933 (north-western Guinea, Ivory Coast, Ghana, south-western Nigeria) Raised to a full species by Eric Vingerhoedt.
- Charaxes nobilis rosaemariae Rousseau-Decelle, 1934 (Democratic Republic of the Congo: Lualaba, Shaba)

== Taxonomy ==
Charaxes nobilis group.

The supposed clade members are:

- Charaxes nobilis
- Charaxes superbus
