= Cephetola eliasis =

Scientific classification
- Kingdom: Animalia
- Phylum: Arthropoda
- Class: Insecta
- Order: Lepidoptera
- Family: Lycaenidae
- Genus: Cephetola
- Species: C. eliasis

Binomial name
- Cephetola eliasis (Kielland & Congdon, 1998)

Synonyms
- Epitola eliasis Kielland & Congdon, 1998

Species of butterfly

Cephetola eliasis is a butterfly in the family Lycaenidae. It is found in Cameroon, the Democratic Republic of the Congo and Tanzania.

== Subspecies ==
- Cephetola eliasis eliasis (north-western Tanzania)
- Cephetola eliasis angustata Libert & Collins, 1999 (Cameroon, Democratic Republic of the Congo)
