= Euphaedra caerulescens =

Scientific classification
- Kingdom: Animalia
- Phylum: Arthropoda
- Class: Insecta
- Order: Lepidoptera
- Family: Nymphalidae
- Genus: Euphaedra
- Species: E. caerulescens

Binomial name
- Euphaedra caerulescens Grose-Smith, 1890

Synonyms
- Euphaedra (Xypetana) caerulescens

Species of butterfly

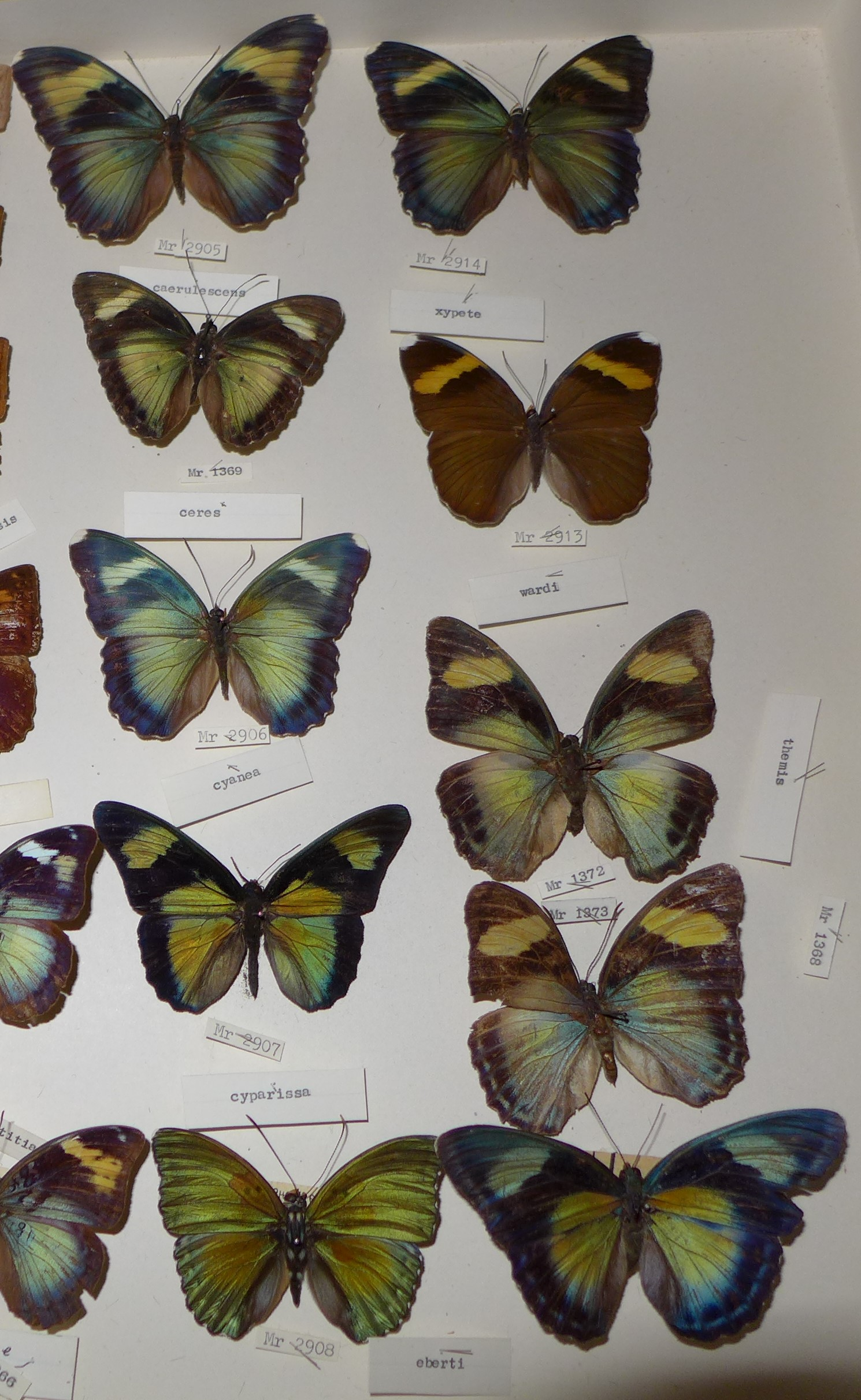
Euphaedra caerulescens pictured top left, along with other butterflies in the Euphaedra genus.

Euphaedra caerulescens is a butterfly in the family Nymphalidae. It is found in the Central African Republic, the Democratic Republic of the Congo, Uganda and possibly Ethiopia.

== Description ==
Very close to Euphaedra xypete qv.

== Subspecies ==
- Euphaedra caerulescens caerulescens (southern Central African Republic, northern Democratic Republic of the Congo, western Uganda: Semuliki National Park)
- Euphaedra caerulescens caliginosa Hecq, 2004 (Central African Republic)
- Euphaedra caerulescens submarginalis Hecq, 1997 (Ethiopia)
