= Cephetola sublustris =

Scientific classification
- Kingdom: Animalia
- Phylum: Arthropoda
- Clade: Pancrustacea
- Class: Insecta
- Order: Lepidoptera
- Family: Lycaenidae
- Genus: Cephetola
- Species: C. sublustris

Binomial name
- Cephetola sublustris (Bethune-Baker, 1904)

Synonyms
- Epitola sublustris Bethune-Baker, 1904

Species of butterfly

Cephetola sublustris, the greasy epitola, is a butterfly in the family Lycaenidae. It is found in Sierra Leone, Ivory Coast, Ghana, Togo, western Nigeria, Cameroon, the Republic of the Congo, the Central African Republic, the Democratic Republic of the Congo, Uganda and north-western Tanzania. Its habitat consists of forests.
