= Cephetola vinalli =

Scientific classification
- Kingdom: Animalia
- Phylum: Arthropoda
- Class: Insecta
- Order: Lepidoptera
- Family: Lycaenidae
- Genus: Cephetola
- Species: C. vinalli

Binomial name
- Cephetola vinalli (Talbot, 1935)

Synonyms
- Epitola vinalli Talbot, 1935; Epitola pseudoconjuncta Jackson, 1962

Species of butterfly

Cephetola vinalli is a butterfly in the family Lycaenidae. It is found in the Republic of the Congo, the Central African Republic, the Democratic Republic of the Congo, Uganda and north-western Tanzania.
