= Thomas Herbert Elliot Jackson =

Entomologist (1903 – 1968)

- Born: 12 January 1903; Dorset, England
- Died: 22 May 1968 (aged 65); Kitale, Kenya
- Cause of death: Stabbing
- Education: Wellington College, Berkshire; Harper Adams Agricultural College
- Occupations: Farmer, scientist, military officer
- Military career
- Allegiance: British Empire
- Branch: British Army
- Rank: Lieutenant colonel
- Unit: 4th Battalion of the King's African Rifles
- Commands: Turkana Irregulars
- Conflicts: World War II; East African campaign; Operation Appearance; Mau Mau rebellion
- Scientific career
- Known for: Largest collection of native butterflies in Africa
- Fields: Entomology, ornithology, botany
- Workplaces: British Museum

Lieutenant-Colonel Thomas Herbert Elliot Jackson (12 January 1903 – 22 May 1968) was an English coffee farmer in Kenya. He served as an officer in the British Army during the Second World War, seeing service with the King's African Rifles and as a military administrator in British Somaliland. Jackson served in the Kenyan colonial administration during the Mau Mau Rebellion.

Jackson was also a keen entomologist best known for his studies of African butterflies. He amassed the largest collection of native butterflies in Africa, that was donated to museums across the world. Jackson was murdered at his farm at Kitale in 1968.

== Early life ==
Jackson was born in Dorset, England, on 12 January 1903, the son of Brigadier-General Herbert Kendall Jackson. He was educated at Wellington College and his father intended for Jackson to follow him into the army. Jackson instead chose a different career and attended Harper Adams Agricultural College, Shropshire. He visited Kenya briefly in 1923 before moving to British India to work on an indigo plantation owned by an uncle.

Jackson returned to Kenya in 1924 and settled there, learning how to grow coffee on a farm owned by Maxwell Trench near Nyeri. Jackson established his own farm, Kapretwa, on the lower slopes of Mount Elgon and was joined by his father and other family members. Jackson's farm was the first in the area to attempt to grow coffee but it quickly became one of the most productive in the Mount Elgon District.

== Second World War ==
After the outbreak of war Jackson joined an officer cadet training unit and was drafted into the 4th battalion of the King's African Rifles. After a while he was seconded to the government of Turkana district, where he raised the Turkana Irregulars as a defence force against Italian invasion from occupied Ethiopia. Following Operation Appearance, which liberated British Somaliland from Italian occupation, Jackson was assigned to the military administration of a large part of the north of the protectorate. By the end of the war he had reached the rank of lieutenant-colonel.

== Later career ==
Jackson returned to his farm after the war and continue to develop it, including a large garden featuring rare orchids. During the Mau Mau rebellion he volunteered for service and held a senior role in Embu district. After the rebellion was quelled he returned to his farm. He was stabbed to death at his home in Kitale by a gang on the night of 22 May 1968. The murder was the second in the White Highlands in a week and a dusk-to-dawn curfew was imposed as a result.

== Entomology ==
Jackson had been a keen naturalist since his youth and though he later focussed on entomology was also an ornithologist and botanist. In 1935 he participated in the British Museum expedition to the Rwenzori Mountains with the dipterist Frederick Wallace Edwards and the botanist George Taylor. The expedition contributed large numbers of moths, butterflies and beetles to the museum collection. Shortly after this expedition Jackson began his own collection of butterflies and writing academic papers on his finds. His favourite families were the Nymphalidae and the Lycaenidae.

In Kenya Jackson amassed one of the world's finest collections of African butterflies, collected in his spare time and on expeditions across Africa. It was the largest collection of native butterflies in Africa. Jackson developed new techniques of capturing and breeding the insects and trained black staff who collected specimens for him in Kenya, Uganda, Tanzania, Middle Congo, Cameroun, Nigeria and the Ivory Coast. At the time of his death he was negotiating with the government of Gabon to send his collectors there.

He collected hundreds of new species. He wrote a number of journal articles on many of his discoveries but his publications were relatively little, compared to his collection. He began writing only at the age of 34 and there were long intervals between his early papers. His output increased in the late 1950s. His most important works are perhaps his early 1960s works on the Epitola and his collaboration with Victor Van Someren on mimicry in African butterflies.

In 1961 Jackson sent around half of his collection, some 65,000 specimens to the British Museum, feeling it would benefit from being more readily available to the scientific community. He often visited the museum to study its collection and compare them to new species he had collected. Through the museum Jackson began a long professional association with French entomologist Henri Stempffer. As well as the donation to the British Museum Jackson donated thousands of specimens to other collections including those of the National Museum of Natural History, France, the Belgian Royal Museum for Central Africa and Stempffer's private collection.

On his death the remainder of his entomological collection, around 65,000 specimens, as well as his library, was left to the Kenyan National Museum at Nairobi.

== Works ==
As per Carcasson & Clench (1969, p. 133):

- Jackson, T. H. E. (1937). "The Early Stages of Some African Lycaenidae (Lepidoptera), with an Account of the Larval Habits". Transactions of the Royal Entomological Society of London. 86 (12): 201–237. Bibcode:1937EcoEn..86..201J. doi:10.1111/j.1365-2311.1937.tb00243.x.
- Cripps, C.; Jackson, T. H. E. (1940). "The Life History of Lachnocnema Bibulus (Fab.) on Kenya (Lepidopt., Lycaenidae)". Transactions of the Royal Entomological Society of London. 90 (15): 449–453. Bibcode:1940EcoEn..90..449C. doi:10.1111/j.1365-2311.1940.tb01029.x.
- Jackson, T. H. E. (1947). "The early stages of some African Lycaenidae (Lepidoptera: Rhopalocera)". Proceedings of the Royal Entomological Society of London A. 22 (4–6): 44–48. doi:10.1111/j.1365-3032.1947.tb01104.x.
- Hale Carpenter, G. D.; Jackson, T. H. E. (1950). "New butterflies from East Africa and the Ituri Forest". Proceedings of the Royal Entomological Society of London B. 19 (7–8): 97–108. Bibcode:1950SysEn..19...97C. doi:10.1111/j.1365-3113.1950.tb00941.x.
- Jackson, T. H. E. (1952). "Notes on some new and rare Rhopalocera from eastern Africa, parts 1 and 2". Proceedings of the Royal Entomological Society of London B: 97–165.
- Van Someren, V. G. L.; Jackson, T. H. E. (1952). "The Charaxes etheocles-ethalion complex: a tentative reclassification of the group". Transactions of the Royal Entomological Society of London (103): 257–284.
- Jackson, T. H. E. (1956). "Notes on the Rhopalocera of the Kigezi district of Uganda with descriptions of new species and sub-species". Journal of the East Africa Natural History Society. 23 (23): 63–102. doi:10.5962/p.140629.
- Van Someren, V. G. L.; Jackson, T. H. E. (1957). "The Charaxes etheocles-ethalion complex: supplement no. 1. (Lepidoptera: Nymphalidae)". Annual of the Transvaal Museum (23): 42–58.
- Jackson, T. H. E. (1957). "Protective mimicry in the pupa of Epitola urania (Lepidoptera: Lycaenidae)". Journal of the Entomological Society of Southern Africa (20): 234.
- Jackson, T. H. E.; Howarth, T. G. (1957). "Diestogyna butleri Aurivillius (Lep.: Nymphalidae) and corrections to an earlier paper". Proceedings of the Royal Entomological Society of London B (226): 99–102.
- Van Someren, V. G. L.; Jackson, T. H. E. (1960). "Some comments on protective resemblance amongst African Lepidoptera (Rhopalocera)". Journal of the Lepidopterists' Society (13): 121–150.
- Jackson, T. H. E. (1961). "Entomological Studies from a High Tower in Mpanga Forest, Uganda". Transactions of the Royal Entomological Society of London. 113 (11): 346–350. Bibcode:1961EcoEn.113..346J. doi:10.1111/j.1365-2311.1961.tb02292.x.
- Jackson, T. H. E. (1962). "The undescribed female of Pseudathyma lucretiodes Hale-Carpenter & Jackson (Lepidoptera: Rhopalocera)". Annals and Magazine of Natural History. 13 (4): 577–578.
- Jackson, T. H. E. (1962). "Notes on the Epitolinae with descriptions of a new genus, species and subspecies. ( Lep.: Lycaenidae)". Bulletin of the British Museum (Natural History), Entomology (12): 125–163.
- Stempffer, H.; Jackson, T. H. E. (1962). "A note on the Rhopalocera of Bugalla Island, Sesse Isles, Uganda". Proceedings of the Royal Entomological Society of London B (31): 33–37.
- Jackson, T. H. E. (1964). "Notes on the Epitolinae (Part II)". Bulletin of the British Museum (Natural History), Entomology (15): 59–80.
- Jackson, T. H. E. (1964). "Addenda and corrigenda to notes on the Epitolinae, Jackson 1962 and 1964". Bulletin of the British Museum (Natural History), Entomology. 12 (3): 125–162.
- Jackson, T. H. E. (1964). "Addenda and corrigenda to notes on the Epitolinae, Jackson 1962 and 1964". Annals and Magazine of Natural History. 13 (7): 697–700. doi:10.1080/00222936408651517.
- Jackson, T. H. E. (1965). "A revision of the genus Chloroselas Butler, with a note on Alaena Boisduval and descriptions of a few new African Lycaenidae (Lepidoptera, Lycaenidae)". Annals and Magazine of Natural History. 13 (8): 523–531. doi:10.1080/00222936508651610.
- Jackson, T. H. E. (1967). "The synonymy in Citrinophila Kirby and further notes on Epiloia Westwood and Alaena Boisduval (Lepidoptera: Lycaenidae)". Journal of Natural History. 1 (3): 327–336. Bibcode:1967JNatH...1..327J. doi:10.1080/00222936700770301.

== Bibliography ==
- Carcasson, R.H.; Clench, H.K. (1969). "Thomas Herbert Elliot Jackson (1903- 1968)" (PDF). Journal of the Lepidopterists' Society. 23 (2): 131–134.
- Carcasson, R.H. (1967). "Thomas Herbert Elliot Jackson" (PDF). Journal of the East Africa Natural History Society. 26 (3 (115)): 149.
