= List of butterflies of Angola =

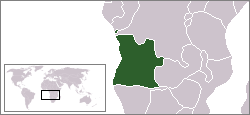
Location of Angola

This is a list of butterflies of Angola. About 510 species are known from Angola; 21 are endemic.

== Papilionidae ==
=== Papilioninae ===
==== Papilionini ====
- Papilio antimachus Drury, 1782
- Papilio zalmoxis Hewitson, 1864
- Papilio nireus Linnaeus, 1758
- Papilio chrapkowskoides nurettini Koçak, 1983
- Papilio sosia pulchra Berger, 1950
- Papilio cynorta Fabricius, 1793
- Papilio dardanus Brown, 1776
- Papilio phorcas congoanus Rothschild, 1896
- Papilio filaprae Suffert, 1904
- Papilio mechowi Dewitz, 1881
- Papilio mechowianus Dewitz, 1885
- Papilio echerioides homeyeri Plötz, 1880
- Papilio lormieri Distant, 1874
- Papilio chitondensis Bivar de Sousa & Fernandes, 1966
- Papilio mackinnoni benguellae Jordan, 1908

==== Leptocercini ====
- Graphium antheus (Cramer, 1779)
- Graphium policenes (Cramer, 1775)
- Graphium junodi (Trimen, 1893)
- Graphium porthaon (Hewitson, 1865)
- Graphium angolanus (Goeze, 1779)
- Graphium taboranus (Oberthür, 1886)
- Graphium schaffgotschi (Niepelt, 1927)
- Graphium ridleyanus (White, 1843)
- Graphium leonidas (Fabricius, 1793)
- Graphium tynderaeus (Fabricius, 1793)
- Graphium latreillianus theorini (Aurivillius, 1881)
- Graphium almansor (Honrath, 1884)
- Graphium ucalegonides (Staudinger, 1884)
- Graphium poggianus (Honrath, 1884)
- Graphium hachei (Dewitz, 1881)
- Graphium ucalegon (Hewitson, 1865)

== Pieridae ==
=== Pseudopontiinae ===
- Pseudopontia paradoxa (Felder & Felder, 1869)

=== Coliadinae ===
- Eurema regularis (Butler, 1876)
- Eurema hecabe solifera (Butler, 1875)
- Catopsilia florella (Fabricius, 1775)
- Colias electo hecate Strecker, 1905

=== Pierinae ===
- Colotis antevippe gavisa (Wallengren, 1857)
- Colotis celimene pholoe (Wallengren, 1860)
- Colotis danae walkeri (Butler, 1884)
- Colotis doubledayi (Hopffer, 1862)
- Colotis euippe (Linnaeus, 1758)
- Colotis regina (Trimen, 1863)
- Eronia cleodora Hübner, 1823
- Eronia leda (Boisduval, 1847)
- Pinacopterix eriphia (Godart, [1819])
- Nepheronia argia (Fabricius, 1775)
- Nepheronia pharis (Boisduval, 1836)
- Nepheronia thalassina verulanus (Ward, 1871)
- Leptosia alcesta (Stoll, [1782])
- Leptosia hybrida Bernardi, 1952
- Leptosia nupta (Butler, 1873)

==== Pierini ====
- Appias epaphia (Cramer, [1779])
- Appias perlucens (Butler, 1898)
- Appias sabina (Felder & Felder, [1865])
- Mylothris agathina (Cramer, 1779)
- Mylothris asphodelus Butler, 1888
- Mylothris elodina diva Berger, 1954
- Mylothris rembina (Plötz, 1880)
- Mylothris rhodope (Fabricius, 1775)
- Mylothris rueppellii rhodesiana Riley, 1921
- Mylothris spica gabela Berger, 1979
- Dixeia capricornus falkensteinii (Dewitz, 1879)
- Dixeia pigea (Boisduval, 1836)
- Belenois aurota (Fabricius, 1793)
- Belenois calypso dentigera Butler, 1888
- Belenois calypso crawshayi Butler, 1894
- Belenois rubrosignata (Weymer, 1901)
- Belenois solilucis Butler, 1874
- Belenois theuszi (Dewitz, 1889)
- Belenois thysa meldolae Butler, 1872
- Belenois welwitschii Rogenhofer, 1890

== Lycaenidae ==
=== Miletinae ===
==== Liphyrini ====
- Euliphyra mirifica Holland, 1890
- Aslauga marshalli Butler, 1899

==== Miletini ====
- Megalopalpus zymna (Westwood, 1851)
- Lachnocnema bibulus (Fabricius, 1793)
- Lachnocnema laches (Fabricius, 1793)
- Lachnocnema intermedia Libert, 1996
- Lachnocnema angolanus Libert, 1996
- Lachnocnema emperamus (Snellen, 1872)
- Lachnocnema regularis Libert, 1996
- Lachnocnema bamptoni Libert, 1996

=== Poritiinae ===
==== Liptenini ====
- Alaena amazoula congoana Aurivillius, 1914
- Alaena rosei Vane-Wright, 1980
- Pentila amenaida Hewitson, 1873
- Pentila pauli benguellana Stempffer & Bennett, 1961
- Pentila tachyroides Dewitz, 1879
- Telipna albofasciata Aurivillius, 1910
- Telipna cuypersi Libert, 2005
- Telipna acraeoides (Grose-Smith & Kirby, 1890)
- Telipna sanguinea (Plötz, 1880)
- Telipna nyanza katangae Stempffer, 1961
- Ornipholidotos ugandae goodi Libert, 2000
- Ornipholidotos gabonensis Stempffer, 1947
- Ornipholidotos sylphida (Staudinger, 1892)
- Liptena homeyeri homeyeri Dewitz, 1884
- Liptena homeyeri straminea Stempffer, Bennett & May, 1974
- Liptena undularis Hewitson, 1866
- Liptena xanthostola xantha (Grose-Smith, 1901)
- Tetrarhanis ilma (Hewitson, 1873)
- Falcuna hollandi (Aurivillius, 1899)
- Falcuna lacteata Stempffer & Bennett, 1963
- Falcuna libyssa angolensis Stempffer & Bennett, 1963
- Falcuna synesia (Hulstaert, 1924)
- Larinopoda lircaea (Hewitson, 1866)
- Larinopoda tera (Hewitson, 1873)
- Eresiomera osheba (Holland, 1890)
- Cnodontes vansomereni Stempffer & Bennett, 1953

==== Epitolini ====
- Epitola urania Kirby, 1887
- Cerautola ceraunia (Hewitson, 1873)
- Cerautola crowleyi leucographa Libert, 1999
- Cerautola miranda vidua (Talbot, 1935)
- Stempfferia cercene (Hewitson, 1873)
- Stempfferia michelae centralis Libert, 1999
- Deloneura barca (Grose-Smith, 1901)
- Epitolina dispar (Kirby, 1887)
- Epitolina melissa (Druce, 1888)
- Hypophytala hyetta (Hewitson, 1873)
- Hewitsonia kirbyi Dewitz, 1879

=== Aphnaeinae ===
- Pseudaletis agrippina Druce, 1888
- Cigaritis homeyeri (Dewitz, 1887)
- Cigaritis modestus (Trimen, 1891)
- Cigaritis trimeni congolanus (Dufrane, 1954)
- Zeritis krystyna d'Abrera, 1980
- Zeritis sorhagenii (Dewitz, 1879)
- Axiocerses tjoane (Wallengren, 1857)
- Axiocerses amanga amanga (Westwood, 1881)
- Axiocerses amanga baumi Weymer, 1901
- Aloeides angolensis Tite & Dickson, 1973
- Erikssonia acraeina Trimen, 1891
- Aphnaeus erikssoni Trimen, 1891
- Aphnaeus orcas (Drury, 1782)

=== Theclinae ===
- Myrina silenus (Fabricius, 1775)
- Dapidodigma demeter nuptus Clench, 1961
- Hypolycaena antifaunus (Westwood, 1851)
- Hypolycaena naara Hewitson, 1873
- Hemiolaus caeculus (Hopffer, 1855)
- Iolaus iasis Hewitson, 1865
- Iolaus violacea (Riley, 1928)
- Iolaus pallene (Wallengren, 1857)
- Iolaus trimeni Wallengren, 1875
- Iolaus parasilanus mabillei (Riley, 1928)
- Iolaus iturensis (Joicey & Talbot, 1921)
- Iolaus timon (Fabricius, 1787)
- Stugeta bowkeri maria Suffert, 1904
- Pilodeudorix mera (Hewitson, 1873)
- Pilodeudorix deritas (Hewitson, 1874)
- Pilodeudorix pseudoderitas (Stempffer, 1964)
- Paradeudorix cobaltina (Stempffer, 1964)
- Paradeudorix petersi (Stempffer & Bennett, 1956)
- Deudorix nicephora Hulstaert, 1924
- Capys connexivus Butler, 1897

=== Polyommatinae ===
==== Lycaenesthini ====
- Anthene alberta (Bethune-Baker, 1910)
- Anthene contrastata mashuna (Stevenson, 1937)
- Anthene flavomaculatus (Grose-Smith & Kirby, 1893)
- Anthene lachares (Hewitson, 1878)
- Anthene ligures (Hewitson, 1874)
- Anthene liodes (Hewitson, 1874)
- Anthene lunulata (Trimen, 1894)
- Anthene nigropunctata (Bethune-Baker, 1910)
- Anthene rubricinctus anadema (Druce, 1905)
- Anthene lyzanius (Hewitson, 1874)
- Anthene lusones (Hewitson, 1874)
- Anthene lacides (Hewitson, 1874)
- Anthene lucretilis (Hewitson, 1874)
- Cupidesthes vidua Talbot, 1929

==== Polyommatini ====
- Cupidopsis cissus extensa Libert, 2003
- Cupidopsis jobates (Hopffer, 1855)
- Pseudonacaduba aethiops (Mabille, 1877)
- Uranothauma falkensteini (Dewitz, 1879)
- Uranothauma heritsia (Hewitson, 1876)
- Uranothauma poggei (Dewitz, 1879)
- Phlyaria cyara (Hewitson, 1876)
- Tuxentius calice (Hopffer, 1855)
- Tuxentius carana (Hewitson, 1876)
- Tuxentius margaritaceus (Sharpe, 1892)
- Tarucus sybaris linearis (Aurivillius, 1924)
- Zintha hintza krooni (Dickson, 1973)
- Azanus isis (Drury, 1773)
- Eicochrysops eicotrochilus Bethune-Baker, 1924
- Oboronia guessfeldti (Dewitz, 1879)
- Oboronia pseudopunctatus (Strand, 1912)
- Oboronia punctatus (Dewitz, 1879)
- Lepidochrysops ansorgei Tite, 1959
- Lepidochrysops chloauges (Bethune-Baker, [1923])
- Lepidochrysops flavisquamosa Tite, 1959
- Lepidochrysops fulvescens Tite, 1961
- Lepidochrysops glauca (Trimen & Bowker, 1887)
- Lepidochrysops hawkeri (Talbot, 1929)
- Lepidochrysops loveni (Aurivillius, 1922)
- Lepidochrysops nacrescens Tite, 1961
- Lepidochrysops reichenowii (Dewitz, 1879)

== Riodinidae ==
=== Nemeobiinae ===
- Abisara tantalus caerulea Carpenter & Jackson, 1950
- Abisara intermedia Aurivillius, 1895
- Abisara caeca semicaeca Riley, 1932
- Abisara dewitzi Aurivillius, 1898
- Abisara rogersi Druce, 1878

== Nymphalidae ==
=== Libytheinae ===
- Libythea labdaca labdaca Westwood, 1851
- Libythea labdaca laius Trimen, 1879

=== Danainae ===
==== Danaini ====
- Danaus chrysippus orientis (Aurivillius, 1909)
- Tirumala petiverana (Doubleday, 1847)
- Amauris niavius (Linnaeus, 1758)
- Amauris crawshayi angola Bethune-Baker, 1914
- Amauris dannfelti Aurivillius, 1891
- Amauris hecate (Butler, 1866)
- Amauris hyalites Butler, 1874

=== Satyrinae ===
==== Elymniini ====
- Elymniopsis bammakoo (Westwood, [1851])

==== Melanitini ====
- Gnophodes betsimena parmeno Doubleday, 1849
- Gnophodes chelys (Fabricius, 1793)

==== Satyrini ====
- Bicyclus angulosa selousi (Trimen, 1895)
- Bicyclus anynana centralis Condamin, 1968
- Bicyclus buea (Strand, 1912)
- Bicyclus campus (Karsch, 1893)
- Bicyclus cottrelli (van Son, 1952)
- Bicyclus dorothea (Cramer, 1779)
- Bicyclus iccius (Hewitson, 1865)
- Bicyclus istaris (Plötz, 1880)
- Bicyclus lamani (Aurivillius, 1900)
- Bicyclus mandanes Hewitson, 1873
- Bicyclus moyses Condamin & Fox, 1964
- Bicyclus nachtetis Condamin, 1965
- Bicyclus martius sanaos (Hewitson, 1866)
- Bicyclus sandace (Hewitson, 1877)
- Bicyclus saussurei (Dewitz, 1879)
- Bicyclus sebetus (Hewitson, 1877)
- Bicyclus smithi (Aurivillius, 1899)
- Bicyclus suffusa (Riley, 1921)
- Bicyclus technatis (Hewitson, 1877)
- Bicyclus vansoni Condamin, 1965
- Bicyclus vulgaris (Butler, 1868)
- Hallelesis asochis congoensis (Joicey & Talbot, 1921)
- Heteropsis angolensis (Kielland, 1994)
- Heteropsis centralis (Aurivillius, 1903)
- Heteropsis eliasis (Hewitson, 1866)
- Heteropsis ochracea (Lathy, 1906)
- Heteropsis phaea (Karsch, 1894)
- Ypthima asterope hereroica van Son, 1955
- Ypthima condamini Kielland, 1982
- Ypthima congoana Overlaet, 1955
- Ypthima doleta Kirby, 1880
- Ypthima impura Elwes & Edwards, 1893
- Ypthima praestans Overlaet, 1954
- Ypthima pulchra Overlaet, 1954
- Ypthima recta Overlaet, 1955
- Mashuna upemba (Overlaet, 1955)
- Neocoenyra cooksoni Druce, 1907

=== Charaxinae ===
==== Charaxini ====
- Charaxes varanes vologeses (Mabille, 1876)
- Charaxes protoclea protonothodes van Someren, 1971
- Charaxes boueti carvalhoi Bivar de Sousa, 1983
- Charaxes macclounii Butler, 1895
- Charaxes lucretius saldanhai Bivar de Sousa, 1983
- Charaxes jasius brunnescens Poulton, 1926
- Charaxes jasius saturnus Butler, 1866
- Charaxes castor (Cramer, 1775)
- Charaxes brutus angustus Rothschild, 1900
- Charaxes brutus natalensis Staudinger, 1885
- Charaxes pollux (Cramer, 1775)
- Charaxes druceanus proximans Joicey & Talbot, 1922
- Charaxes eudoxus mechowi Rothschild, 1900
- Charaxes numenes aequatorialis van Someren, 1972
- Charaxes tiridates tiridatinus Röber, 1936
- Charaxes bohemani Felder & Felder, 1859
- Charaxes smaragdalis leopoldi Ghesquiére, 1933
- Charaxes pythodoris Hewitson, 1873
- Charaxes zingha (Stoll, 1780)
- Charaxes etesipe (Godart, 1824)
- Charaxes penricei penricei Rothschild, 1900
- Charaxes penricei dealbata van Someren, 1966
- Charaxes achaemenes Felder & Felder, 1867
- Charaxes jahlusa argynnides Westwood, 1864
- Charaxes eupale latimargo Joicey & Talbot, 1921
- Charaxes dilutus Rothschild, 1898
- Charaxes anticlea proadusta van Someren, 1971
- Charaxes hildebrandti (Dewitz, 1879)
- Charaxes etheocles ochracea van Someren & Jackson, 1957
- Charaxes cedreatis Hewitson, 1874
- Charaxes howarthi Minig, 1976
- Charaxes fulgurata Aurivillius, 1899
- Charaxes loandae van Someren, 1969
- Charaxes brainei van Son, 1966
- Charaxes guderiana (Dewitz, 1879)
- Charaxes pleione congoensis Plantrou, 1989
- Charaxes paphianus Ward, 1871
- Charaxes kahldeni Homeyer & Dewitz, 1882
- Charaxes zoolina ehmckei Homeyer & Dewitz, 1882
- Charaxes nichetes Grose-Smith, 1883
- Charaxes lycurgus bernardiana Plantrou, 1978
- Charaxes zelica rougeoti Plantrou, 1978

==== Euxanthini ====
- Charaxes eurinome ansellica (Butler, 1870)
- Charaxes trajanus (Ward, 1871)

==== Pallini ====
- Palla decius (Cramer, 1777)
- Palla violinitens coniger (Butler, 1896)

=== Apaturinae ===
- Apaturopsis cleochares (Hewitson, 1873)

=== Nymphalinae ===
==== Nymphalini ====
- Antanartia delius (Drury, 1782)
- Junonia artaxia Hewitson, 1864
- Junonia natalica angolensis (Rothschild, 1918)
- Junonia sophia infracta Butler, 1888
- Junonia stygia (Aurivillius, 1894)
- Junonia terea elgiva Hewitson, 1864
- Junonia cymodoce lugens (Schultze, 1912)
- Salamis cacta (Fabricius, 1793)
- Protogoniomorpha anacardii ansorgei (Rothschild, 1904)
- Protogoniomorpha parhassus (Drury, 1782)
- Protogoniomorpha temora (Felder & Felder, 1867)
- Precis actia Distant, 1880
- Precis archesia (Cramer, 1779)
- Precis ceryne (Boisduval, 1847)
- Precis coelestina Dewitz, 1879
- Precis octavia sesamus Trimen, 1883
- Precis pelarga (Fabricius, 1775)
- Hypolimnas anthedon (Doubleday, 1845)
- Hypolimnas dinarcha (Hewitson, 1865)
- Hypolimnas misippus (Linnaeus, 1764)
- Hypolimnas monteironis (Druce, 1874)
- Hypolimnas salmacis (Drury, 1773)

=== Cyrestinae ===
==== Cyrestini ====
- Cyrestis camillus (Fabricius, 1781)

=== Biblidinae ===
==== Biblidini ====
- Byblia anvatara crameri Aurivillius, 1894
- Mesoxantha ethosea ethoseoides Rebel, 1914
- Ariadne enotrea archeri Carcasson, 1958
- Neptidopsis ophione nucleata Grünberg, 1911
- Eurytela dryope angulata Aurivillius, 1899
- Eurytela hiarbas (Drury, 1782)

==== Epicaliini ====
- Sevenia amulia intermedia (Carcasson, 1961)
- Sevenia amulia benguelae (Chapman, 1872)
- Sevenia consors (Rothschild & Jordan, 1903)
- Sevenia occidentalium penricei (Rothschild & Jordan, 1903)
- Sevenia pechueli (Dewitz, 1879)
- Sevenia trimeni (Aurivillius, 1899)

=== Limenitinae ===
==== Limenitidini ====
- Harma theobene superna (Fox, 1968)
- Cymothoe beckeri (Herrich-Schaeffer, 1858)
- Cymothoe caenis (Drury, 1773)
- Cymothoe excelsa deltoides Overlaet, 1944
- Cymothoe hypatha (Hewitson, 1866)
- Cymothoe lurida hesione Weymer, 1907
- Cymothoe sangaris (Godart, 1824)
- Pseudoneptis bugandensis ianthe Hemming, 1964
- Pseudacraea boisduvalii (Doubleday, 1845)
- Pseudacraea dolomena (Hewitson, 1865)
- Pseudacraea eurytus (Linnaeus, 1758)
- Pseudacraea kuenowii gottbergi Dewitz, 1884
- Pseudacraea lucretia protracta (Butler, 1874)
- Pseudacraea poggei (Dewitz, 1879)
- Pseudacraea semire (Cramer, 1779)

==== Neptidini ====
- Neptis gratiosa Overlaet, 1955
- Neptis jordani Neave, 1910
- Neptis melicerta (Drury, 1773)
- Neptis morosa Overlaet, 1955
- Neptis nebrodes Hewitson, 1874
- Neptis nemetes margueriteae Fox, 1968
- Neptis nicomedes Hewitson, 1874
- Neptis quintilla Mabille, 1890
- Neptis nicoteles Hewitson, 1874
- Neptis nysiades Hewitson, 1868

==== Adoliadini ====
- Catuna crithea (Drury, 1773)
- Euryphura concordia (Hopffer, 1855)
- Pseudargynnis hegemone (Godart, 1819)
- Aterica galene extensa Heron, 1909
- Cynandra opis bernardii Lagnel, 1967
- Euriphene barombina (Aurivillius, 1894)
- Euriphene gambiae gabonica Bernardi, 1966
- Euriphene iris (Aurivillius, 1903)
- Euriphene plagiata (Aurivillius, 1897)
- Euriphene saphirina trioculata (Talbot, 1927)
- Bebearia oxione squalida (Talbot, 1928)
- Bebearia guineensis (Felder & Felder, 1867)
- Bebearia cocalia katera (van Someren, 1939)
- Bebearia sophus (Fabricius, 1793)
- Bebearia plistonax (Hewitson, 1874)
- Bebearia hassoni Hecq, 1998
- Euphaedra medon celestis Hecq, 1986
- Euphaedra zaddachii Dewitz, 1879
- Euphaedra morini Hecq, 1983
- Euphaedra permixtum (Butler, 1873)
- Euphaedra fontainei Hecq, 1977
- Euphaedra preussi Staudinger, 1891
- Euphaedra eleus (Drury, 1782)
- Euphaedra coprates (Druce, 1875)
- Euphaedra ruspina (Hewitson, 1865)
- Euphaedra harpalyce spatiosa (Mabille, 1876)
- Euphaedra losinga wardi (Druce, 1874)
- Euptera mocquerysi Staudinger, 1893

=== Heliconiinae ===
==== Acraeini ====
- Acraea admatha Hewitson, 1865
- Acraea anemosa Hewitson, 1865
- Acraea camaena (Drury, 1773)
- Acraea endoscota Le Doux, 1928
- Acraea eugenia Karsch, 1893
- Acraea leucographa Ribbe, 1889
- Acraea neobule Doubleday, 1847
- Acraea pseudolycia pseudolycia Butler, 1874
- Acraea pseudolycia astrigera Butler, 1899
- Acraea quirina (Fabricius, 1781)
- Acraea zetes (Linnaeus, 1758)
- Acraea acrita ambigua Trimen, 1891
- Acraea asema Hewitson, 1877
- Acraea atolmis Westwood, 1881
- Acraea bailundensis Wichgraf, 1918
- Acraea bellona Weymer, 1908
- Acraea cepheus (Linnaeus, 1758)
- Acraea diogenes Suffert, 1904
- Acraea egina (Cramer, 1775)
- Acraea guillemei Oberthür, 1893
- Acraea lapidorum Pierre, 1988
- Acraea omrora Trimen, 1894
- Acraea onerata Trimen, 1891
- Acraea periphanes Oberthür, 1893
- Acraea violarum Boisduval, 1847
- Acraea atergatis Westwood, 1881
- Acraea buettneri Rogenhofer, 1890
- Acraea caldarena Hewitson, 1877
- Acraea ella Eltringham, 1911
- Acraea lygus Druce, 1875
- Acraea pseudegina Westwood, 1852
- Acraea pudorella Aurivillius, 1899
- Acraea rogersi Hewitson, 1873
- Acraea consanguinea (Aurivillius, 1899)
- Acraea epaea (Cramer, 1779)
- Acraea leopoldina (Aurivillius, 1895)
- Acraea poggei Dewitz, 1879
- Acraea pseuderyta Godman & Salvin, 1890
- Acraea umbra macarioides (Aurivillius, 1893)
- Acraea acerata Hewitson, 1874
- Acraea bonasia (Fabricius, 1775)
- Acraea circeis (Drury, 1782)
- Acraea encedana Pierre, 1976
- Acraea serena (Fabricius, 1775)
- Acraea esebria Hewitson, 1861
- Acraea jodutta (Fabricius, 1793)
- Acraea lycoa Godart, 1819
- Acraea orestia Hewitson, 1874
- Acraea peneleos pelasgius Grose-Smith, 1900
- Acraea pentapolis Ward, 1871
- Acraea pharsalus Ward, 1871
- Acraea karschi Aurivillius, 1899
- Acraea uvui balina Karsch, 1892
- Acraea ventura Hewitson, 1877
- Acraea viviana Staudinger, 1896
- Acraea mirifica Lathy, 1906
- Acraea rahira Boisduval, 1833
- Acraea speciosa Wichgraf, 1909
- Acraea oreas angolanus Lathy, 1906
- Acraea parrhasia servona Godart, 1819
- Acraea perenna Doubleday, 1847

==== Vagrantini ====
- Lachnoptera anticlia (Hübner, 1819)
- Phalanta eurytis (Doubleday, 1847)
- Phalanta phalantha aethiopica (Rothschild & Jordan, 1903)

== Hesperiidae ==
=== Coeliadinae ===
- Coeliades bixana Evans, 1940
- Coeliades chalybe (Westwood, 1852)
- Coeliades forestan (Stoll, [1782])
- Coeliades hanno (Plötz, 1879)
- Coeliades libeon (Druce, 1875)
- Coeliades pisistratus (Fabricius, 1793)
- Pyrrhochalcia iphis (Drury, 1773)

=== Pyrginae ===
==== Celaenorrhinini ====
- Loxolexis hollandi (Druce, 1909)
- Celaenorrhinus homeyeri (Plötz, 1880)
- Eretis herewardi rotundimacula Evans, 1937
- Eretis lugens (Rogenhofer, 1891)
- Eretis melania Mabille, 1891
- Sarangesa bouvieri (Mabille, 1877)
- Sarangesa motozi (Wallengren, 1857)
- Sarangesa pandaensis Joicey & Talbot, 1921
- Sarangesa seineri Strand, 1909

==== Tagiadini ====
- Tagiades flesus (Fabricius, 1781)
- Eagris hereus (Druce, 1875)
- Eagris lucetia (Hewitson, 1875)
- Eagris tigris liberti Collins & Larsen, 2005
- Calleagris hollandi (Butler, 1897)
- Calleagris jamesoni ansorgei Evans, 1951
- Caprona cassualalla Bethune-Baker, 1911
- Abantis contigua Evans, 1937
- Abantis tettensis Hopffer, 1855
- Abantis vidua Weymer, 1901

==== Carcharodini ====
- Spialia colotes (Druce, 1875)
- Spialia delagoae (Trimen, 1898)
- Spialia ploetzi (Aurivillius, 1891)
- Spialia secessus (Trimen, 1891)

=== Hesperiinae ===
==== Aeromachini ====
- Astictopterus abjecta (Snellen, 1872)
- Kedestes brunneostriga (Plötz, 1884)
- Kedestes callicles (Hewitson, 1868)
- Kedestes lema Neave, 1910
- Kedestes nerva paola Plötz, 1884
- Kedestes protensa Butler, 1901
- Gorgyra diversata Evans, 1937
- Gorgyra mocquerysii Holland, 1896
- Teniorhinus harona (Westwood, 1881)
- Ceratrichia punctata Holland, 1896
- Pardaleodes incerta (Snellen, 1872)
- Pardaleodes sator pusiella Mabille, 1877
- Pardaleodes tibullus (Fabricius, 1793)
- Acada biseriata (Mabille, 1893)
- Osmodes thora (Plötz, 1884)
- Parosmodes lentiginosa (Holland, 1896)
- Parosmodes morantii (Trimen, 1873)
- Meza cybeutes (Holland, 1894)
- Meza indusiata (Mabille, 1891)
- Meza meza (Hewitson, 1877)
- Paronymus budonga (Evans, 1938)
- Andronymus caesar (Fabricius, 1793)
- Andronymus helles Evans, 1937
- Andronymus hero Evans, 1937
- Andronymus neander (Plötz, 1884)
- Chondrolepis niveicornis (Plötz, 1883)
- Zophopetes cerymica (Hewitson, 1867)
- Gretna cylinda (Hewitson, 1876)
- Pteroteinon laufella (Hewitson, 1868)
- Leona maracanda (Hewitson, 1876)
- Caenides dacela (Hewitson, 1876)
- Monza cretacea (Snellen, 1872)
- Fresna nyassae (Hewitson, 1878)
- Platylesches batangae (Holland, 1894)

==== Baorini ====
- Brusa allardi Berger, 1967
- Borbo fanta (Evans, 1937)
- Borbo holtzi (Plötz, 1883)
- Borbo micans (Holland, 1896)

=== Heteropterinae ===
- Metisella angolana (Karsch, 1896)
- Metisella meninx (Trimen, 1873)
- Lepella lepeletier (Latreille, 1824)

== See also ==
- Geography of Angola
- Angolan Scarp savanna and woodlands, the steep coastal escarpment.
- Angolan montane forest-grassland mosaic, the inland slopes of the central highlands which are covered in grassland and contain the remaining patches of mountain woodland;
- Angolan miombo woodlands, much of the large inland plain, indeed most of central Angola.
- Angolan mopane woodlands, an area in the south, mostly comprising Cunene Province and extending across the border into neighbouring Namibia.
