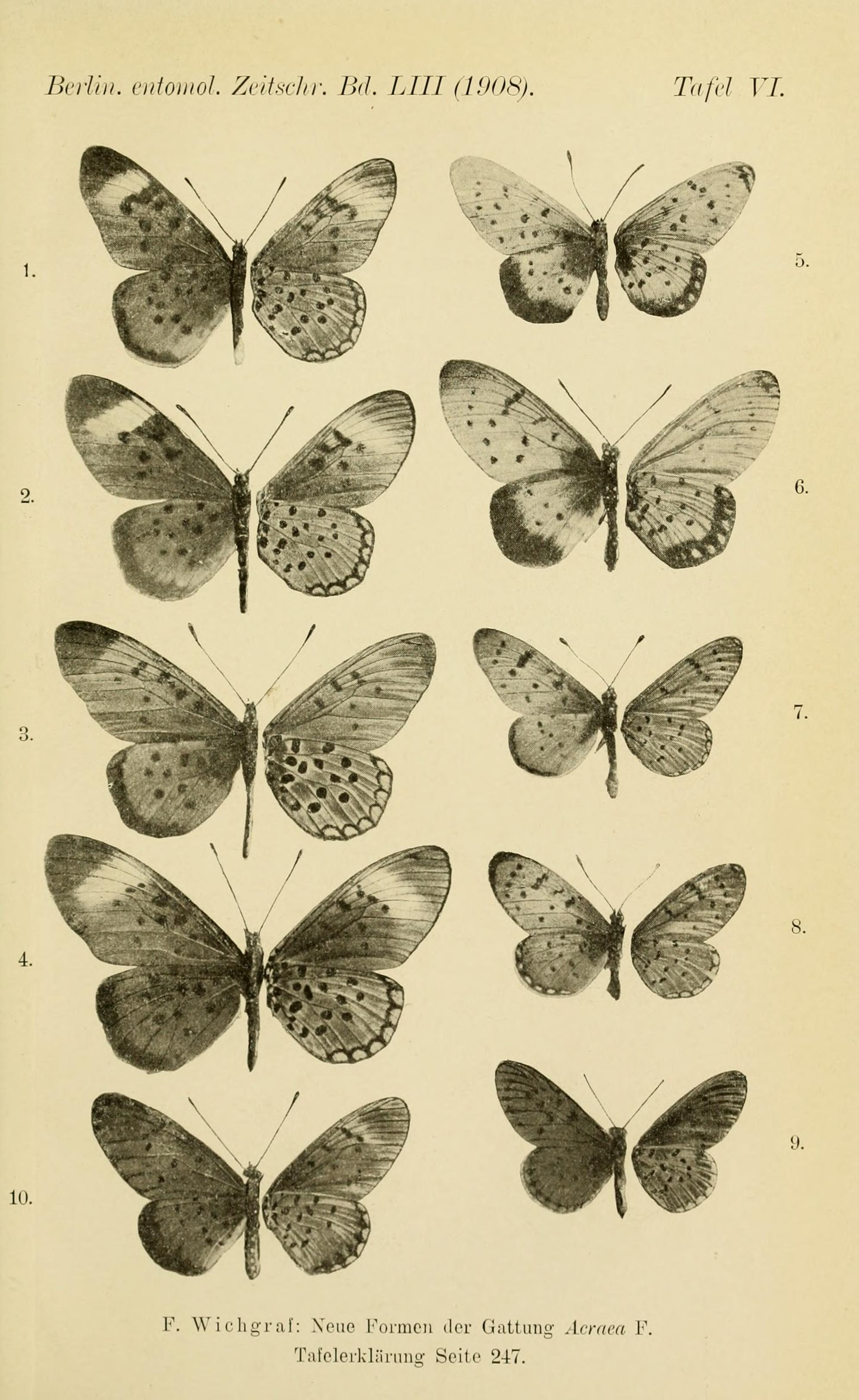
- Figures 5 and 6

Scientific classification
- Kingdom: Animalia
- Phylum: Arthropoda
- Class: Insecta
- Order: Lepidoptera
- Family: Nymphalidae
- Genus: Acraea
- Species: A. omrora

Binomial name
- Acraea omrora Trimen, 1894

Synonyms
- Acraea (Acraea) omrora; Acraea violarum umbrata Wichgraf, 1909

= Acraea omrora =

Species of butterfly

Acraea omrora, the omrora acraea, is a butterfly in the family Nymphalidae. It is found in Angola, Zambia and the Democratic Republic of the Congo.

== Description ==
A. omrora Trim, may be easily known by the marginal band on the upperside of the hindwing, which is black, unspotted and not sharply defined. Both wings above blackish at the base; the black dots arranged quite as in the last two species [ violarum, asema ], but the submarginal dot in 5 of the forewing appears to be always absent. In the type-form the ground-colour is dark ochre-yellowish, the forewing has no black apical spot (only a fine marginal line) and the marginal band of the hindwing above is 2.5 mm. in breadth. Angola and Damaraland. - umbrata Wichgr. has the ground-colour brick-red to grey-red, an apical spot on the forewing 3 mm. in breadth and the marginal band of the hindwing 3 to 5 mm. in breadth. Rhodesia and Katanga.

== Subspecies ==
- Acraea omrora omrora (southern Angola)
- Acraea omrora umbraetae Pierre, 1988 (northern Zambia, Democratic Republic of the Congo: south to Lualaba and Haut-Lomani)

== Biology ==
Adults are on wing from August to December.

The larvae feed on Basananthe reticulata.

== Taxonomy ==
Species group undetermined - but see also Pierre & Bernaud, 2014
