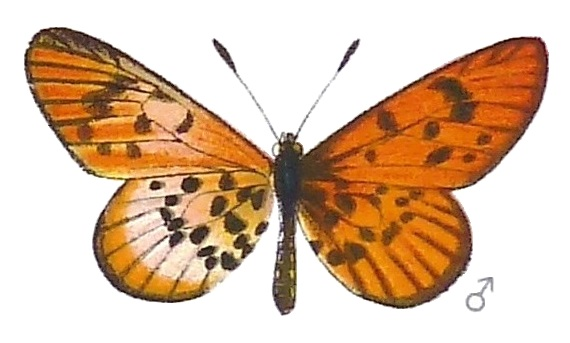
- Male imago illustrated in Seitz (1900)

Scientific classification
- Kingdom: Animalia
- Phylum: Arthropoda
- Class: Insecta
- Order: Lepidoptera
- Family: Nymphalidae
- Genus: Acraea
- Species: A. rohlfsi

Binomial name
- Acraea rohlfsi Suffert, 1904

Synonyms
- Acraea (Acraea) rohlfsi

= Acraea rohlfsi =

Species of butterfly

Acraea rohlfsi is a butterfly in the family Nymphalidae. It is found in northern Tanzania. Acraea rohlfsi is very similar to Acraea petraea qv. It is a member of the Acraea cepheus species group, but see also Pierre & Bernaud, 2014.
