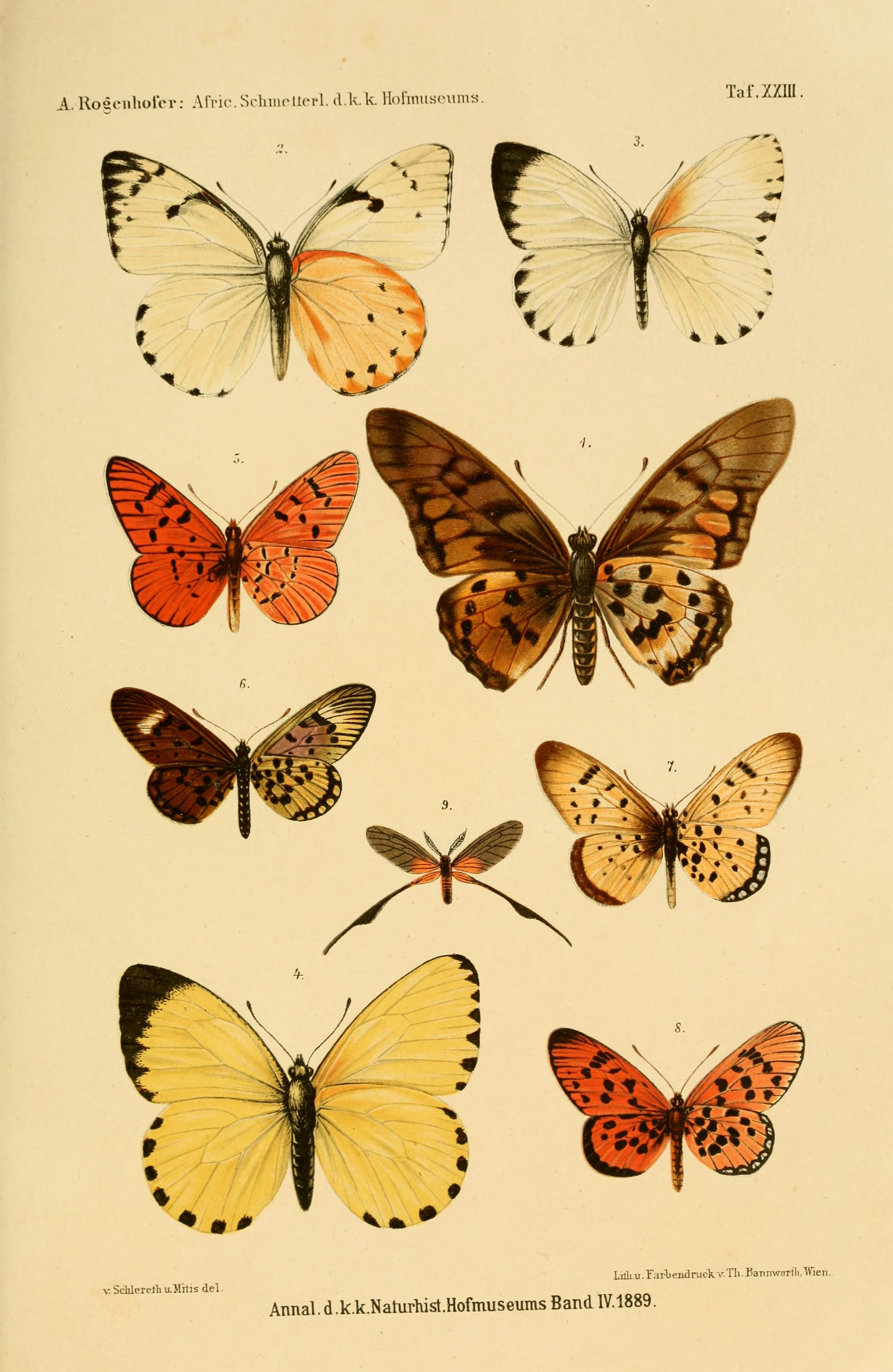
- Figure 8

Scientific classification
- Kingdom: Animalia
- Phylum: Arthropoda
- Class: Insecta
- Order: Lepidoptera
- Family: Nymphalidae
- Genus: Acraea
- Species: A. buettneri

Binomial name
- Acraea buettneri Rogenhofer, 1890

Synonyms
- Acraea (Acraea) buettneri; Acraea felina Trimen, 1891; Acraea buettneri parapetraea Schouteden, 1919; Acraea buettneri f. contracta Le Doux, 1923; Acraea buettneri f. nigroapicalis Overlaet, 1955

= Acraea buettneri =

Species of butterfly

Acraea buettneri, the Buettner's acraea, is a butterfly in the family Nymphalidae. It is found in the Democratic Republic of the Congo, Angola and Zambia (the north-western part of the country and the Copperbelt).

== Description ==
A. buettneri Rog. (54 f). Wings above orange-yellow with large angular black dots, which are arranged as in petraea; distal margin and apex of the forewing narrowly black and the veins before the distal margin black-edged; wings beneath more reddish yellow and the hindwing often with red spots at the base; marginal band narrow, 1 to 1.5 mm. in breadth, above unspotted, beneath with large, transversely placed white marginal spots; the discal dot in 3 large and nearer to the distal margin than those in 2 and 4. Damaraland, Rhodesia and southern Congo.

== Biology ==
The habitat consists of woodland.

== Taxonomy ==
It is a member of the Acraea cepheus species group. See also Pierre & Bernaud, 2014.
