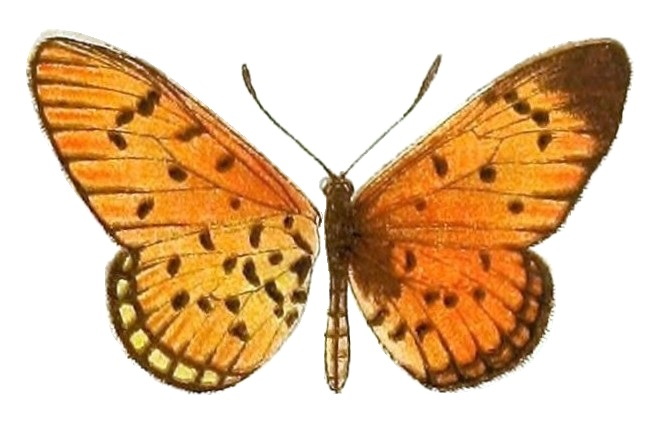
- A. periphanes in Seitz (1925)

Scientific classification
- Kingdom: Animalia
- Phylum: Arthropoda
- Class: Insecta
- Order: Lepidoptera
- Family: Nymphalidae
- Genus: Acraea
- Species: A. periphanes

Binomial name
- Acraea periphanes Oberthür, 1893
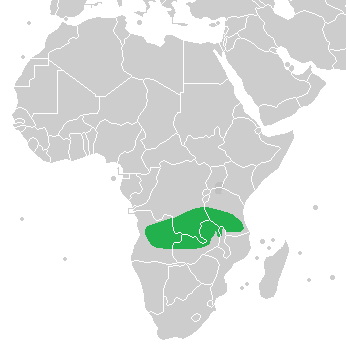
- approximate range

Synonyms
- Acraea (Acraea) periphanes; Acraea beni Bethune-Baker, 1908; Acraea onerata f. umida Wichgraf, 1909; Acraea periphanes f. melaina Eltringham, 1911; Acraea periphanes f. acritoides Eltringham, 1911; Acraea periphanes f. marginata Eltringham, 1911; Acraea periphanes interposita Wichgraf, 1918; Acraea periphanes f. seitzi Le Doux, 1922; Acraea periphanes f. bihensis Le Doux, 1923

= Acraea periphanes =

Species of butterfly

Acraea periphanes is a butterfly in the family Nymphalidae which is native to the southern subtropics of Africa.

== Range ==
It is found in northern Zambia, Malawi, southern and western Tanzania, the southern Democratic Republic of the Congo (Haut-Lomami, Lualaba, Haut-Shaba) and Angola.

== Description ==
A. periphanes Oberth. (55 b). With this species begin the forms in which discal dot 4 of the hindwing is placed nearer to the distal margin than discal dots 3 and 5; in having the veins of both wings black towards the distal margin it approximates to A. atolmis and differs from the following species; the discal dot in 5 of the hindwing is nearly always absent and the one in cellule 4 of the forewing is placed somewhat more distally than those in 3, 5 and 6, which stand in a straight line. In the type-form the forewing above has a black apical spot 6 to 7 mm. in breadth and the hindwing a marginal band 1.5 to 2 mm. in breadth, which is usually light-spotted above also; the upperside of the forewing is not, and that of the hindwing but little darkened at the base. The female has often a darkened or whitish ground-colour. Rhodesia, southern Congo and Nyassaland.

- f. beni Baker only differs in the absence of the black apical spot on the forewing above. Angola and Rhodesia.
- f. acritoides Eltr. The apical spot on the upperside of the forewing is absent or is only 2 mm. in breadth and the discal dots in 3 to 6 of the forewing are entirely absent; wings above not darkened at the base; marginal band of the hindwing as in the type-form; through the absence of discal dots 3 to 6 of the forewing this form becomes very similar to A. acrita (55 b), from which it only differs in the black veins of the forewing. Rhodesia.
- f. umida Wichgr. differs from the preceding in having the upperside of the wings darkened at the base and in that of the hindwing having a deep black, unspotted marginal band 3 to 4 mm. in breadth; the apical spot of the forewing is absent or only moderately developed. Rhodesia.
- f. melaina Eltr. (59 f) has the apical spot on the upperside of the forewing 6 to 7 mm. in breadth and only gradually narrowed posteriorly, a very broad, unspotted marginal band on the upperside of the hindwing and the base of the wings darker above. Rhodesia.

== Biology ==
The habitat consists of marshy grassland.

== Taxonomy ==
It is a member of the Acraea cepheus species group. See also Pierre & Bernaud, 2014
