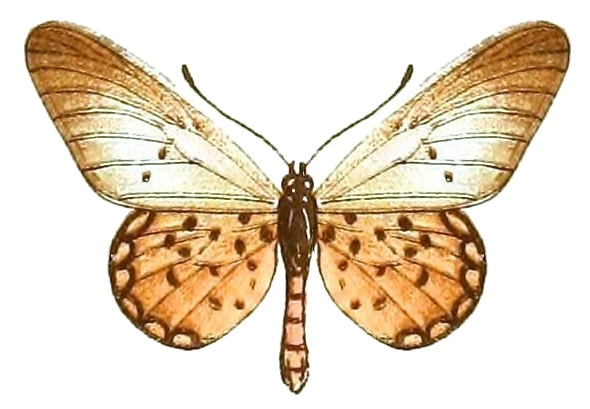
- Acraea diogenes in Seitz (1925)

Scientific classification
- Kingdom: Animalia
- Phylum: Arthropoda
- Class: Insecta
- Order: Lepidoptera
- Family: Nymphalidae
- Genus: Acraea
- Species: A. diogenes

Binomial name
- Acraea diogenes Suffert, 1904

Synonyms
- Acraea (Acraea) diogenes; Acraea acutipennis Lathy, 1906; Acraea lactea Neave, 1910

= Acraea diogenes =

Species of butterfly

Acraea diogenes is a butterfly in the family Nymphalidae. It is found in the Democratic Republic of the Congo (from the south to Haut-Lomani and Lualaba), Angola and north-western and north-eastern Zambia.

== Description ==
A. diogenes Suff . (55 f) is only known in the female, but suggests a thinly scaled form of the preceding species [ Acraea leucopyga ]. Forewing transparent whitish grey, at the apex and distal margin broadly darkened, with discal dots in 1 b and 2 and occasionally also with a median dot, but with no other dots. Hindwing somewhat more fully scaled, above dull grey, beneath with reddish spots; marginal band and black dots almost as in leucopyga. Southern Congo.

== Taxonomy ==
It is a member of the Acraea cepheus species group. But see also Pierre & Bernaud, 2014.
