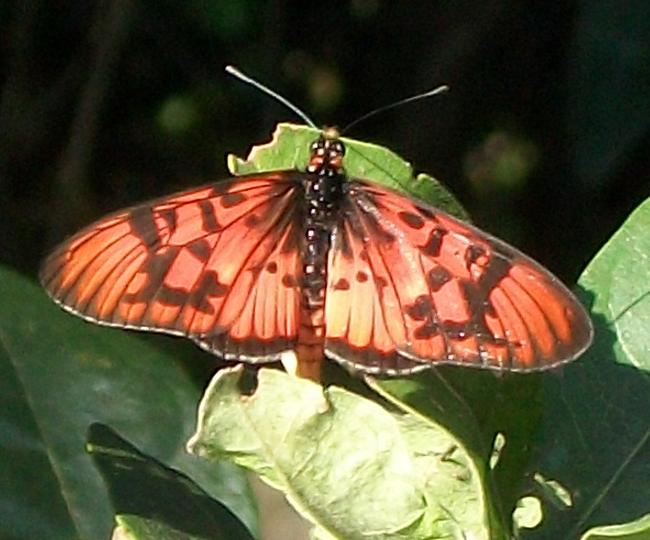
- Male
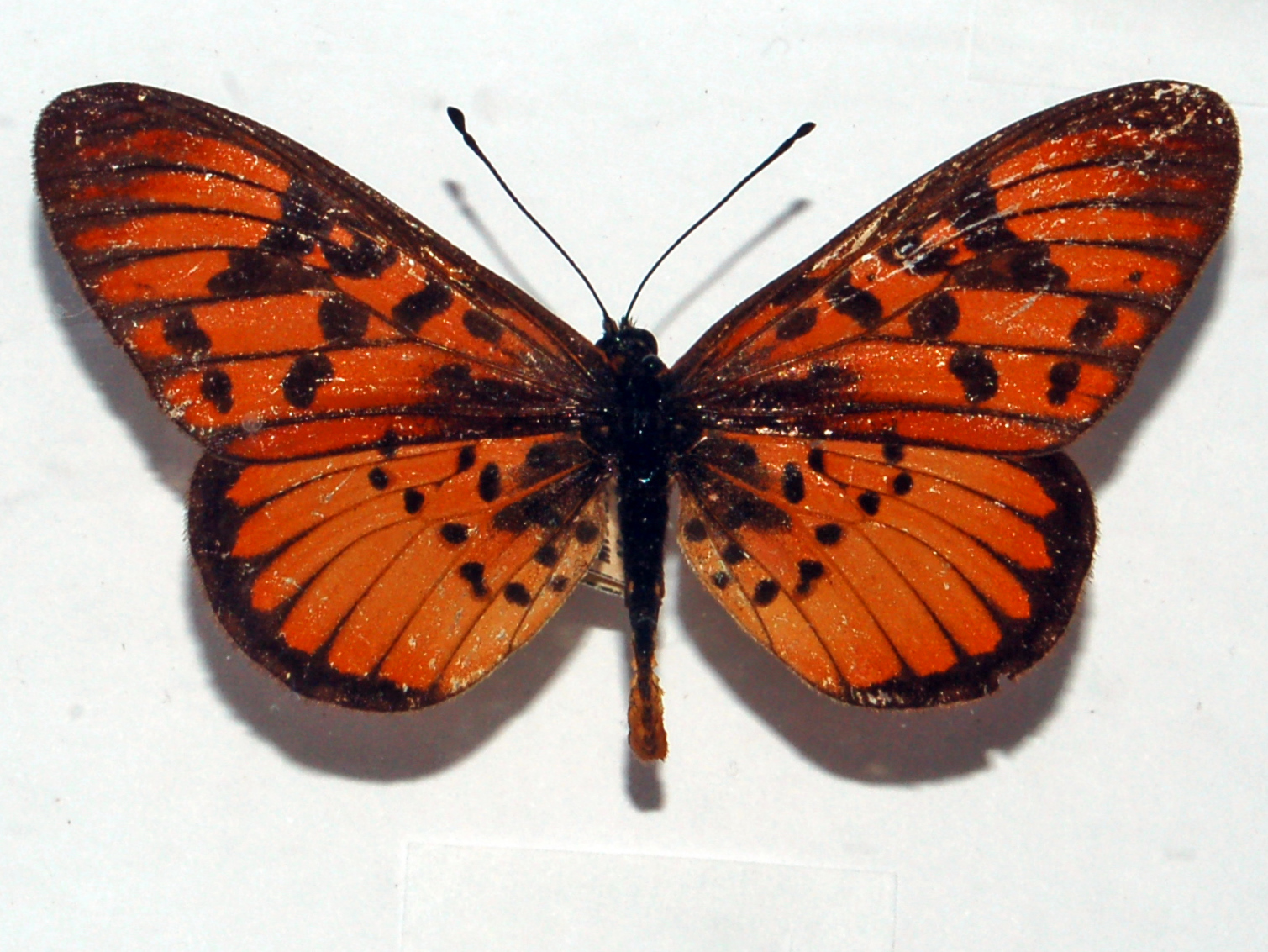
- Mounted

Conservation status
- Least Concern (IUCN 3.1)

Scientific classification
- Kingdom: Animalia
- Phylum: Arthropoda
- Class: Insecta
- Order: Lepidoptera
- Family: Nymphalidae
- Genus: Acraea
- Species: A. petraea

Binomial name
- Acraea petraea Boisduval, 1847

Synonyms
- Acraea petraea petrina Suffert, 1904; Acraea petraea ab. taborana Suffert, 1904; Acraea petraea ab. pseudacontias Wichgraf, 1914; Acraea petraea ab. grisea Neustetter, 1916

= Acraea petraea =

Species of butterfly

Acraea petraea, the blood acraea or blood-red acraea, is a butterfly of the family Nymphalidae. It is found in coastal forests from KwaZulu-Natal to Mozambique, Kenya and Malawi.

The wingspan is 45–48 mm (1.8–1.9 in) for males and 45–55 mm (1.8–2.2 in) for females.A. petraea Bdv. (54 f) recalls A. atolmis, from which it can be at once distinguished by the submarginal dots of the forewing. Wings above bright red to orange-yellow with the black markings strongly developed; discal dots 3 to 6 of the forewing are placed in a line vertically to the costal margin and are often enlarged and joined to the median spot; the hindwing beneath light reddish yellow with red spots between the dots and red spots or streaks before the marginal band; the discal dot in 3 seems to be always absent. The females have a broad white or whitish subapical band on the forewing and the ground-colour is often darker, reddish grey to black-grey, particularly on the forewing. The dry-season form, petrina Suff., has reddish marginal spots at the apex of the fore wing. - Larva goldy brown with black longitudinal and transverse lines and black spines; head black with white angled spot; lives on Oncoba kraussiana. Pupa light brown to red-brown with black markings. - ab. taborana Suff, only differs in having the black dusting at the base of the forewing extended as far as the black dots in the cell and the discal dots of the forewing smaller. -

rohlfsi Suff. (60 d). [now species Acraea rohlfsi ] After an exact comparison of the figures and description of this form with petraea I can only regard it as an extreme form of the latter, from which it differs in having the marginal band of the hindwing narrow and on the underside indistinct. In all other characters it agrees with petraea. The difference between rohlfsi and petraea is hence almost the same as between atolmis and acontias or between atergatis and its dry-season form. I have specimens of petraea before me from German East Africa which form a distinct transition to rohlfsi, having the marginal band of the hindwing scarcely more than 0.5 mm. in breadth; this is, however, distinctly defined beneath by black streaks. Ukerewe Island in Victoria Nyanza.

== Biology ==
Adults are on wing year round, with a peak from November to February.

The larvae feed on Xylotheca kraussiana and Xylotheca kotzei.

== Taxonomy ==
It is a member of the Acraea cepheus species group. See also Pierre & Bernaud, 2014.
