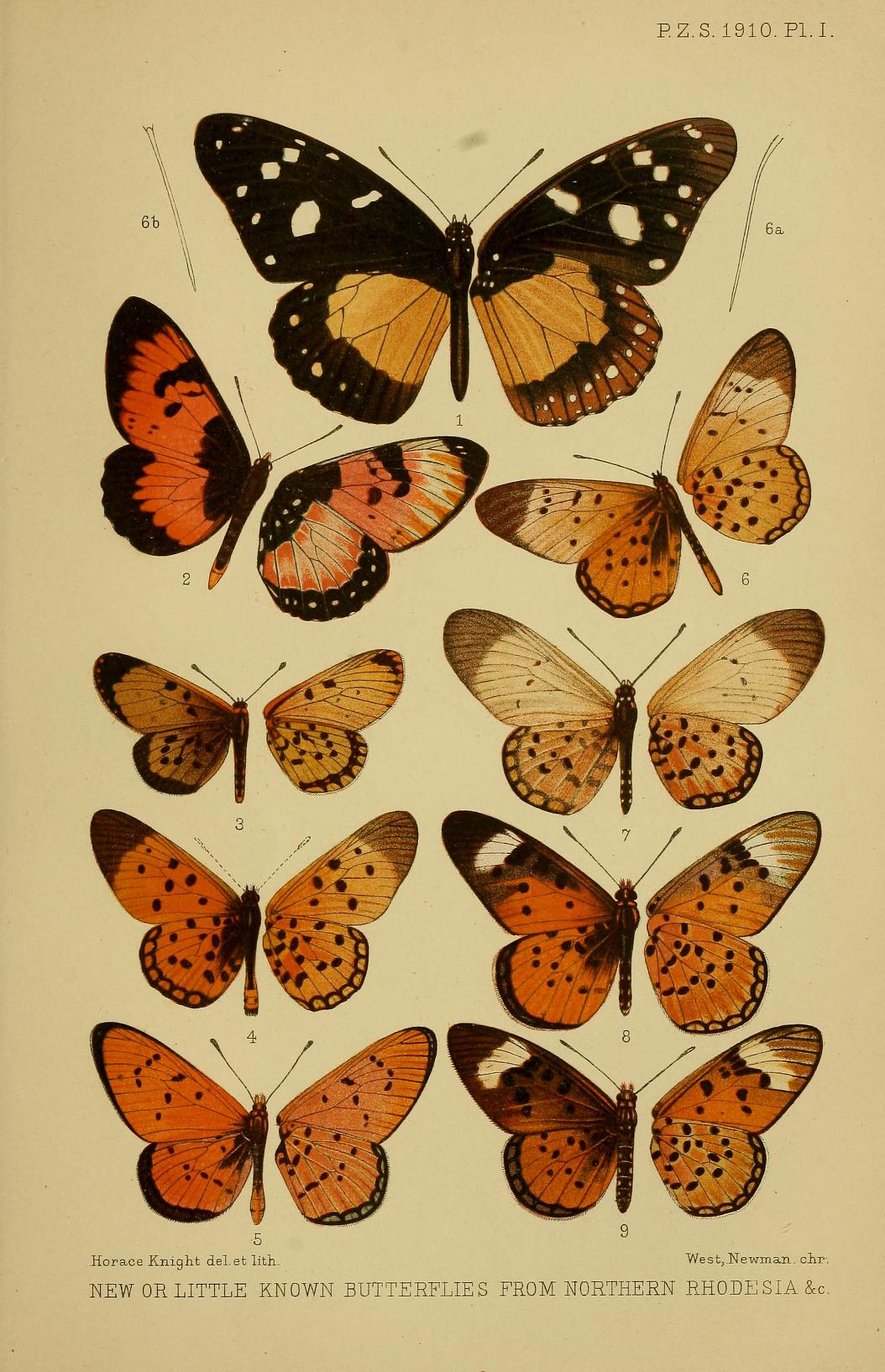
- Figure 3

Scientific classification
- Kingdom: Animalia
- Phylum: Arthropoda
- Class: Insecta
- Order: Lepidoptera
- Family: Nymphalidae
- Genus: Acraea
- Species: A. mirifica

Binomial name
- Acraea mirifica Lathy, 1906

Synonyms
- Acraea (Actinote) mirifica

= Acraea mirifica =

Species of butterfly

Acraea mirifica is a butterfly in the family Nymphalidae. It is found in Angola, northern Zambia and the Democratic Republic of the Congo (Lualaba).

== Description ==
A. mirifica Lathy. Although this species differs from all other African Acraeids in the colouring of the upper surface in the male, the markings of the underside show that it belongs to this subgroup and that Eltringham has undoubtedly done rightly in placing it in the same section as anacreon and wigginsi. male : both wings above deep black, the hind wing unicolorous without markings, the forewing immediately beyond the apex of the cell with a light yellow transverse band 4 to 5 mm. in breadth, which runs from the costal margin to the hinder angle and is angled at vein 4, and at the distal margin with small reddish dots. Forewing beneath in cellules 1 a to 2 and in the greater part of the cell deep black, in the apical part and at the costal margin golden yellow with narrow black, red-spotted marginal band. Hindwing beneath gold-yellow with black basal and discal dots and black marginal band, which encloses large gold-yellow marginal spots and red dots at the proximal end of the marginal spots; a red spot at the base of cellules 1 c and 8. The female differs from the male in having the forewing above dark grey with distinct black discal dots and a black marginal band, while the yellow transverse band of the forewing is absent and both wings beneath are dull goldy yellow without any black markings except the marginal bands and the basal and discal dots. Expanse 41 to 48 mm. Angola and Rhodesia.

== Biology ==
The habitat consists of marshy areas.

== Taxonomy ==
It is a member of the Acraea rahira species group - but see also Pierre & Bernaud, 2014
