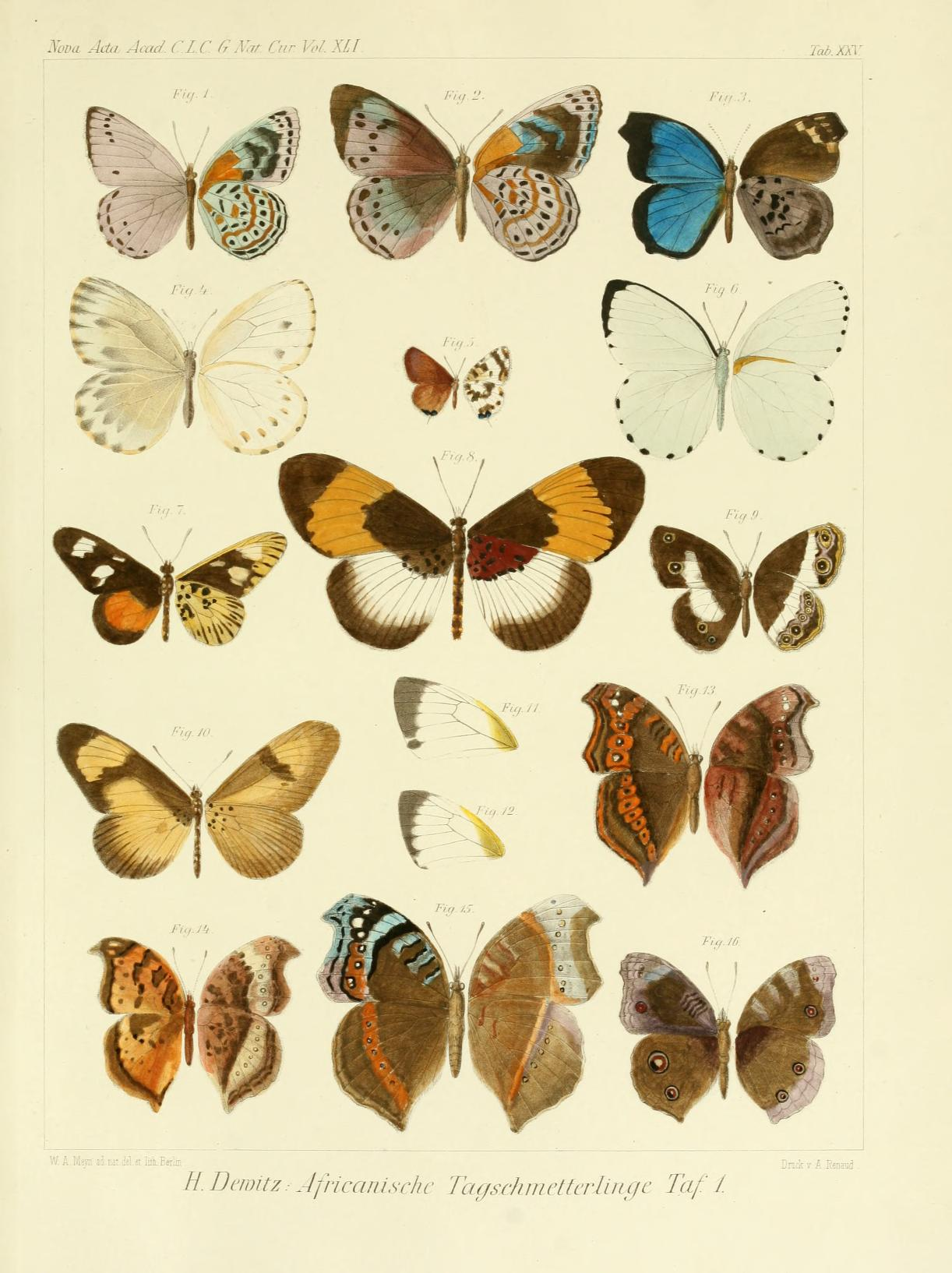
- Figure 9

Scientific classification
- Kingdom: Animalia
- Phylum: Arthropoda
- Clade: Pancrustacea
- Class: Insecta
- Order: Lepidoptera
- Family: Nymphalidae
- Genus: Bicyclus
- Species: B. saussurei

Binomial name
- Bicyclus saussurei (Dewitz, 1879)

Synonyms
- Mycalesis saussurei Dewitz, 1879; Mycalesis saussurei var. camerunia Strand, 1914

= Bicyclus saussurei =

Species of butterfly

Bicyclus saussurei, the white-banded bush brown or Saussure's bush brown, is a butterfly in the family Nymphalidae. It is found in Nigeria, Cameroon, Angola, the Democratic Republic of the Congo, Sudan, Uganda, Rwanda, Burundi, Kenya, Tanzania and Zambia. The habitat consists of dense sub-montane forests.

The larvae feed on Poaceae species.

== Subspecies ==
- Bicyclus saussurei saussurei (highlands of Angola, southern and central Democratic Republic of the Congo, Zambia)
- Bicyclus saussurei angustus Condamin, 1970 (Democratic Republic of the Congo: Kivu, southern Sudan, Uganda, Rwanda, Burundi, western Kenya, north-western Tanzania)
- Bicyclus saussurei camerunia (Strand, 1914) (eastern Nigeria, Cameroon)
