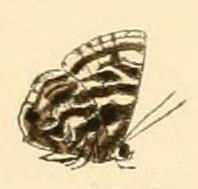

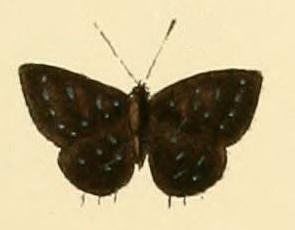

Scientific classification
- Kingdom: Animalia
- Phylum: Arthropoda
- Clade: Pancrustacea
- Class: Insecta
- Order: Lepidoptera
- Family: Lycaenidae
- Genus: Anthene
- Species: A. lucretilis

Binomial name
- Anthene lucretilis (Hewitson, 1874)

Synonyms
- Lycaenesthes lucretilis Hewitson, 1874; Anthene (Triclema) lucretilis; Anthene lucretia Grose-Smith and Kirby, 1894; Triclema lucretilis albipicta Talbot, 1935

= Anthene lucretilis =

Irrorated ciliate blue

Species of butterfly

Anthene lucretilis, the irrorated ciliate blue, is a butterfly in the family Lycaenidae. It is found in Sierra Leone, Ivory Coast, Ghana, Togo, Nigeria, Cameroon, Gabon, the Republic of the Congo, Angola, the Democratic Republic of the Congo and Uganda.

== Subspecies ==
- Anthene lucretilis lucretilis (Sierra Leone, Ivory Coast, Ghana, Togo, Nigeria: south and the Cross River loop, Cameroon, Gabon, Congo, Angola)
- Anthene lucretilis albipicta (Talbot, 1935) (Democratic Republic of the Congo: east to Equateur and Uele, western Uganda)
