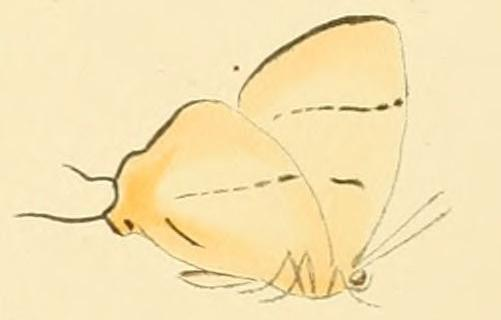

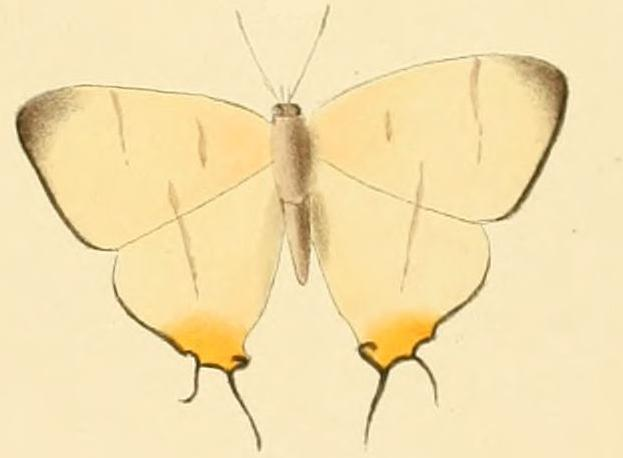

Conservation status
- Least Concern (IUCN 3.1)

Scientific classification
- Kingdom: Animalia
- Phylum: Arthropoda
- Class: Insecta
- Order: Lepidoptera
- Family: Lycaenidae
- Genus: Iolaus
- Species: I. pallene

Binomial name
- Iolaus pallene (Wallengren, 1857)

Synonyms
- Myrina pallene Wallengren, 1857; Aphniolaus pallene (Wallengren, 1857)

= Iolaus pallene =

Species of butterfly

Iolaus pallene, the saffron sapphire, is a butterfly of the family Lycaenidae. It is found from southern Sudan, Angola, southern Democratic Republic of the Congo (Shaba) and Kenya to South Africa. In South Africa it is found from the thorn belt of KwaZulu-Natal and Eswatini to Mpumalanga, Gauteng, Limpopo and North West.

The wingspan is 30–35 mm for males and 34–38 mm for females. Adults are on wing year round in warmer areas with peaks in spring and late summer. In the cooler south-western part of its range adults are on wing from September to February.

The larvae feed on Ximenia afra and Ximenia americana.
