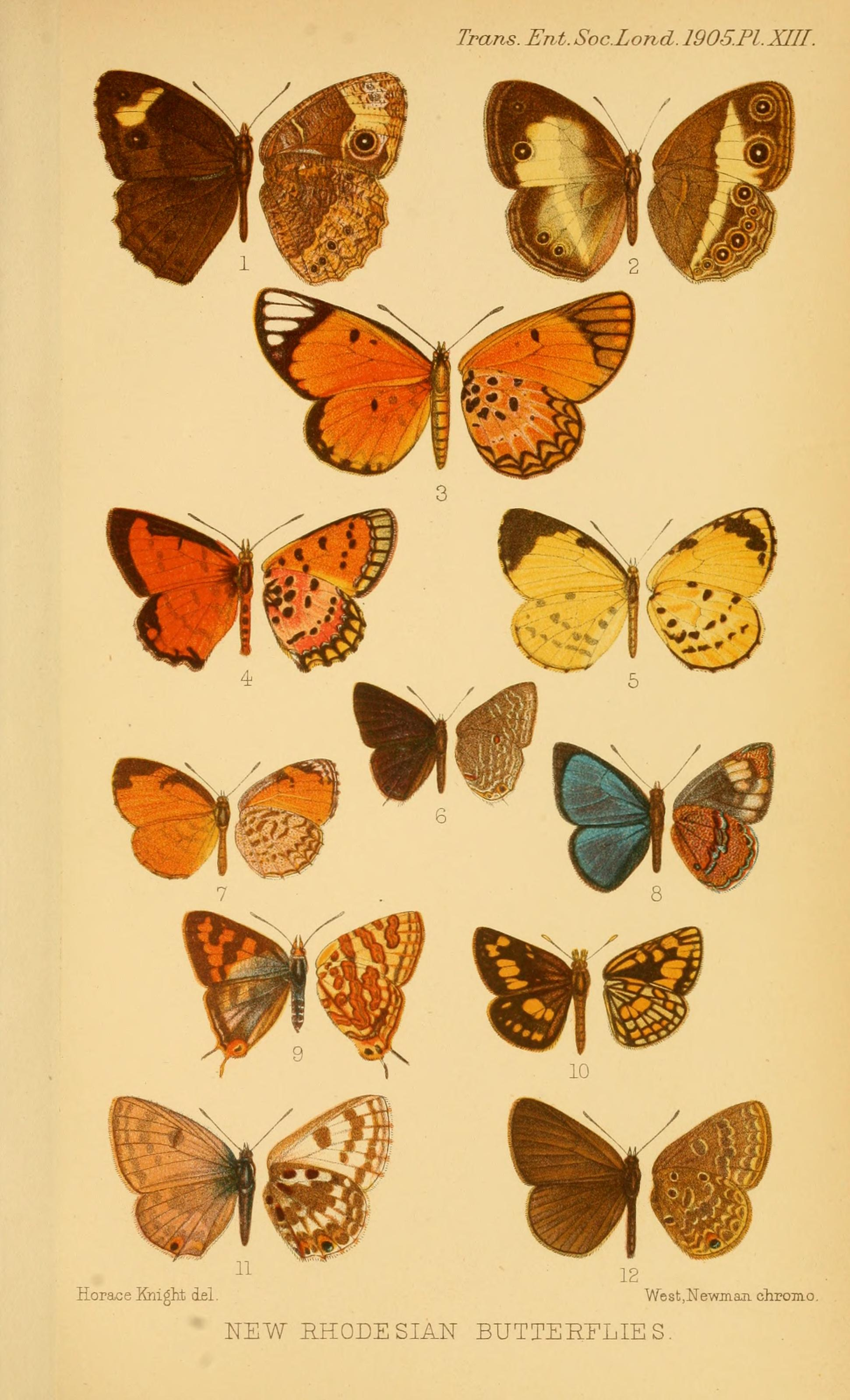
- Figure 5

Scientific classification
- Kingdom: Animalia
- Phylum: Arthropoda
- Class: Insecta
- Order: Lepidoptera
- Family: Lycaenidae
- Genus: Liptena
- Species: L. homeyeri

Binomial name
- Liptena homeyeri Dewitz, 1884

= Liptena homeyeri =

Species of butterfly

Liptena homeyeri is a butterfly in the family Lycaenidae. It is found in Tanzania, Zambia, the Democratic Republic of the Congo and Angola. The habitat consists of Brachystegia woodland.

== Subspecies ==
- Liptena homeyeri homeyeri (Tanzania: M’pala, northern Zambia, south-eastern Angola, Democratic Republic of the Congo: Kivu, Sankuru, Lualaba and Shaba)
- Liptena homeyeri straminea Stempffer, Bennett & May, 1974 (Angola)

== Etymology ==
The name honours Alexander von Homeyer
