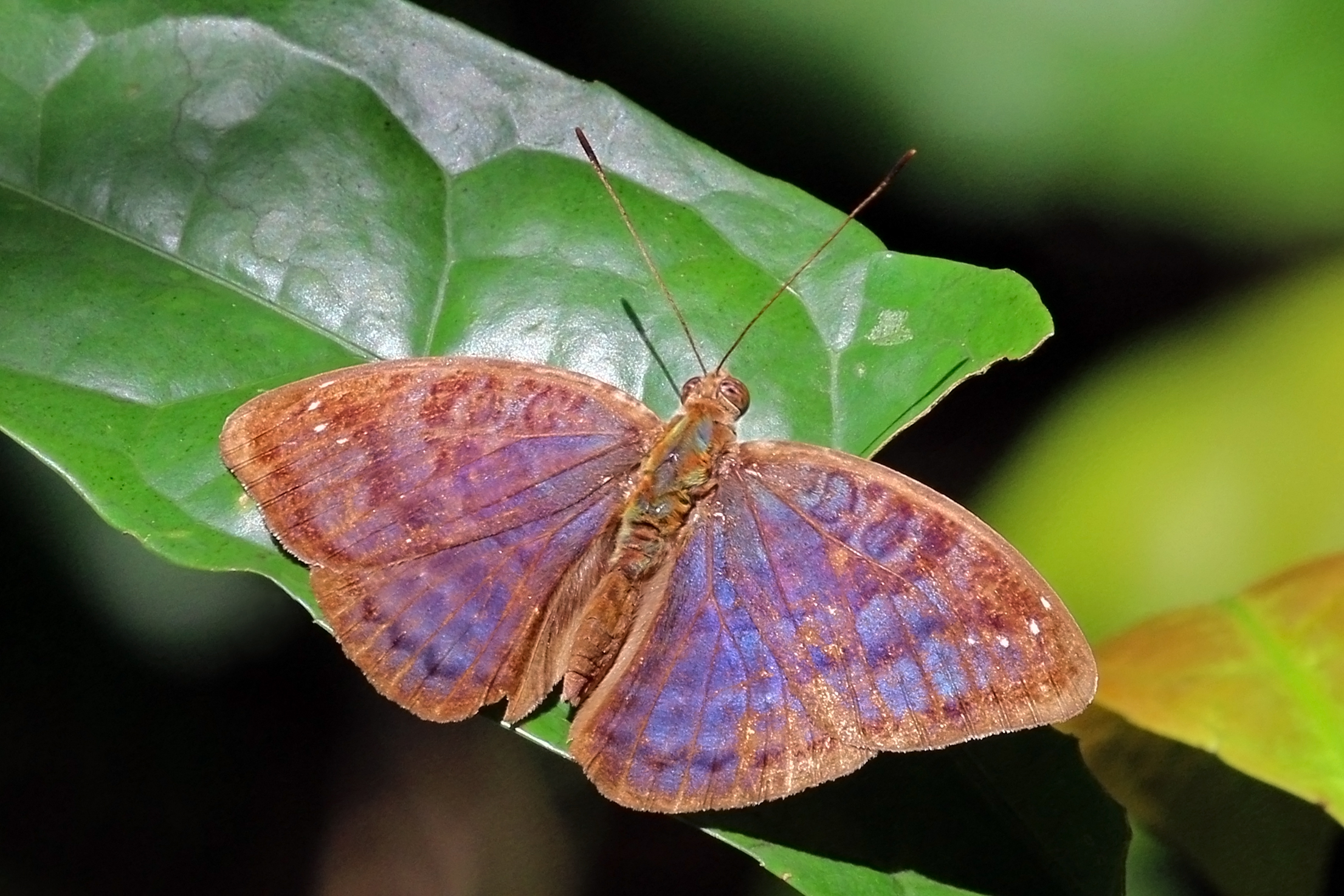
- male in Ghana

Scientific classification
- Kingdom: Animalia
- Phylum: Arthropoda
- Clade: Pancrustacea
- Class: Insecta
- Order: Lepidoptera
- Family: Nymphalidae
- Genus: Euriphene
- Species: E. barombina

Binomial name
- Euriphene barombina (Aurivillius, 1894)

Synonyms
- Diestogyna veronica var. barombina Aurivillius, 1894; Euriphene (Euriphene) barombina; Diestogyna albopunctata Aurivillius, 1898

= Euriphene barombina =

Species of butterfly

Euriphene barombina, the common nymph, is a butterfly in the family Nymphalidae. It is found in eastern Ivory Coast, Ghana, Nigeria, Cameroon, Gabon, the Republic of the Congo, the Central African Republic, northern Angola and the Democratic Republic of the Congo The species is replaced further east by Euriphene saphirina. The habitat consists of forests.

The larvae feed on Combretum species.

Torben Larsen developed a species numbering system for his 2005 publication Butterflies of West Africa. This species is #960. The 'Larsen' numbers have since been used with permission in A Sharp Eye on Butterflies of Ghana.
