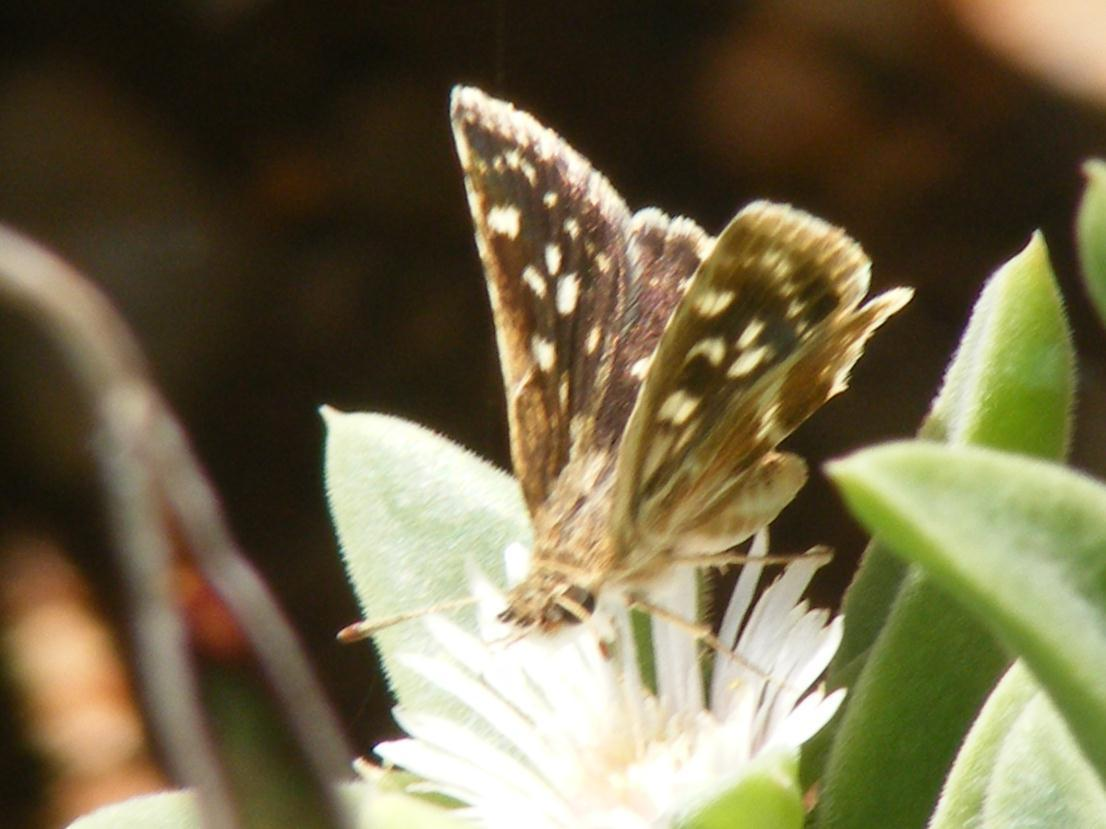

Scientific classification
- Domain: Eukaryota
- Kingdom: Animalia
- Phylum: Arthropoda
- Class: Insecta
- Order: Lepidoptera
- Family: Hesperiidae
- Genus: Spialia
- Species: S. delagoae

Binomial name
- Spialia delagoae (Trimen, 1898)

Synonyms
- Pyrgus delagoae Trimen, 1898; Syrichtus delagoae

= Spialia delagoae =

Species of butterfly

Spialia delagoae, the Delagoa sandman or Delagoa grizzled skipper, is a butterfly of the family Hesperiidae. It is found in Namibia, Botswana, Transvaal, Eswatini, KwaZulu-Natal, Zimbabwe, Mozambique and Kenya. The habitat consists of moist and dry savanna.

The wingspan is 21–24 mm for males and 24–28 mm for females. There are two generations per year with peaks from February to March and from August to September.
