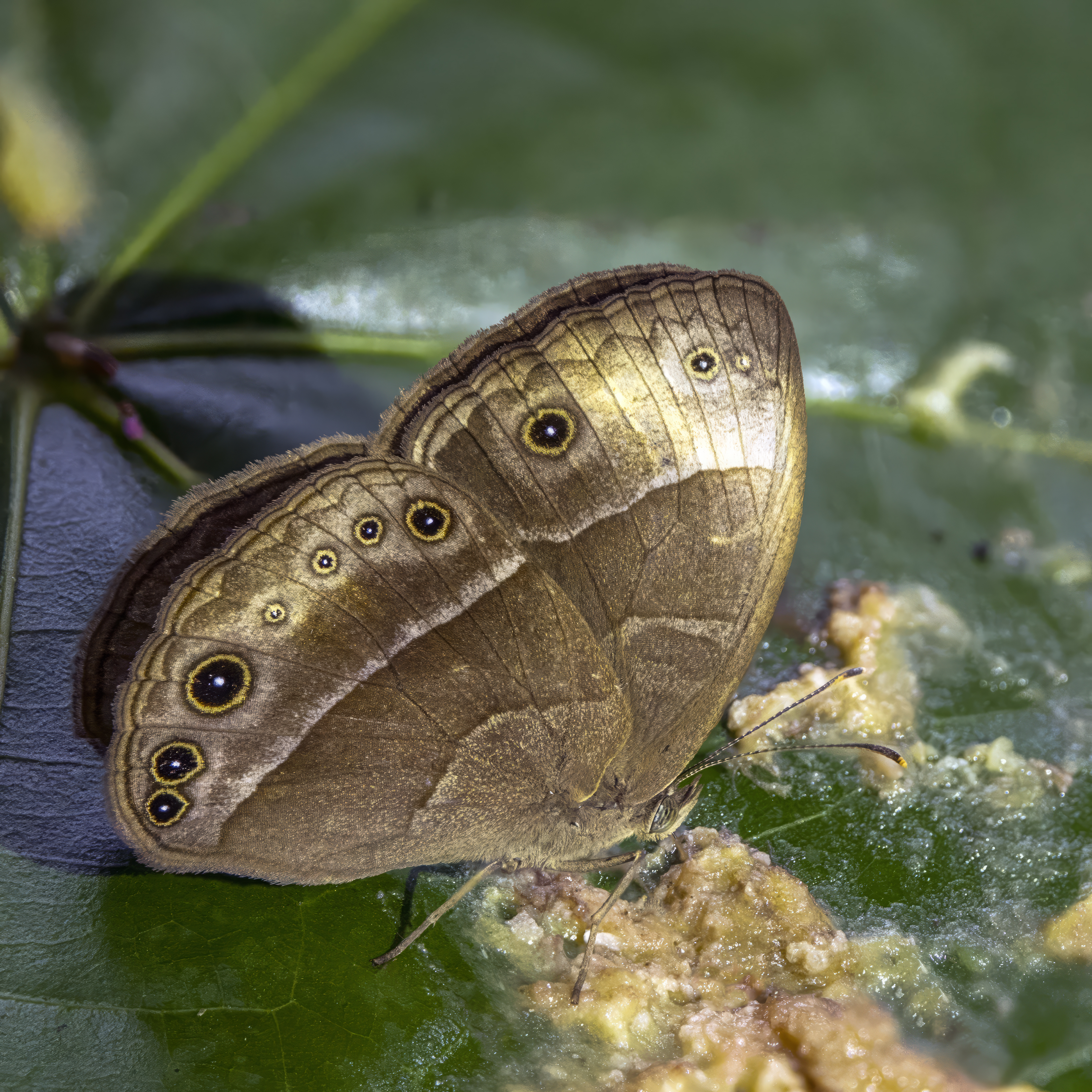
- In Ghana

Scientific classification
- Kingdom: Animalia
- Phylum: Arthropoda
- Clade: Pancrustacea
- Class: Insecta
- Order: Lepidoptera
- Family: Nymphalidae
- Genus: Bicyclus
- Species: B. istaris

Binomial name
- Bicyclus istaris (Plötz, 1880)

Synonyms
- Mycalesis istaris Plötz, 1880; Mycalesis rhanidostroma Karsch, 1893; Monotrichtis sophrosyne brunnea Jackson, 1951

= Bicyclus istaris =

Velvet bush brown

Species of butterfly

Bicyclus istaris, the velvet bush brown, is a butterfly in the family Nymphalidae. It is found in Guinea, Sierra Leone, Liberia, Ivory Coast, Ghana, Togo, Nigeria, Cameroon, Angola, the Democratic Republic of the Congo, southern Sudan, Uganda, Kenya (west of the Rift Valley) and north-western Tanzania. The habitat consists of wetter forests in somewhat hilly areas.
