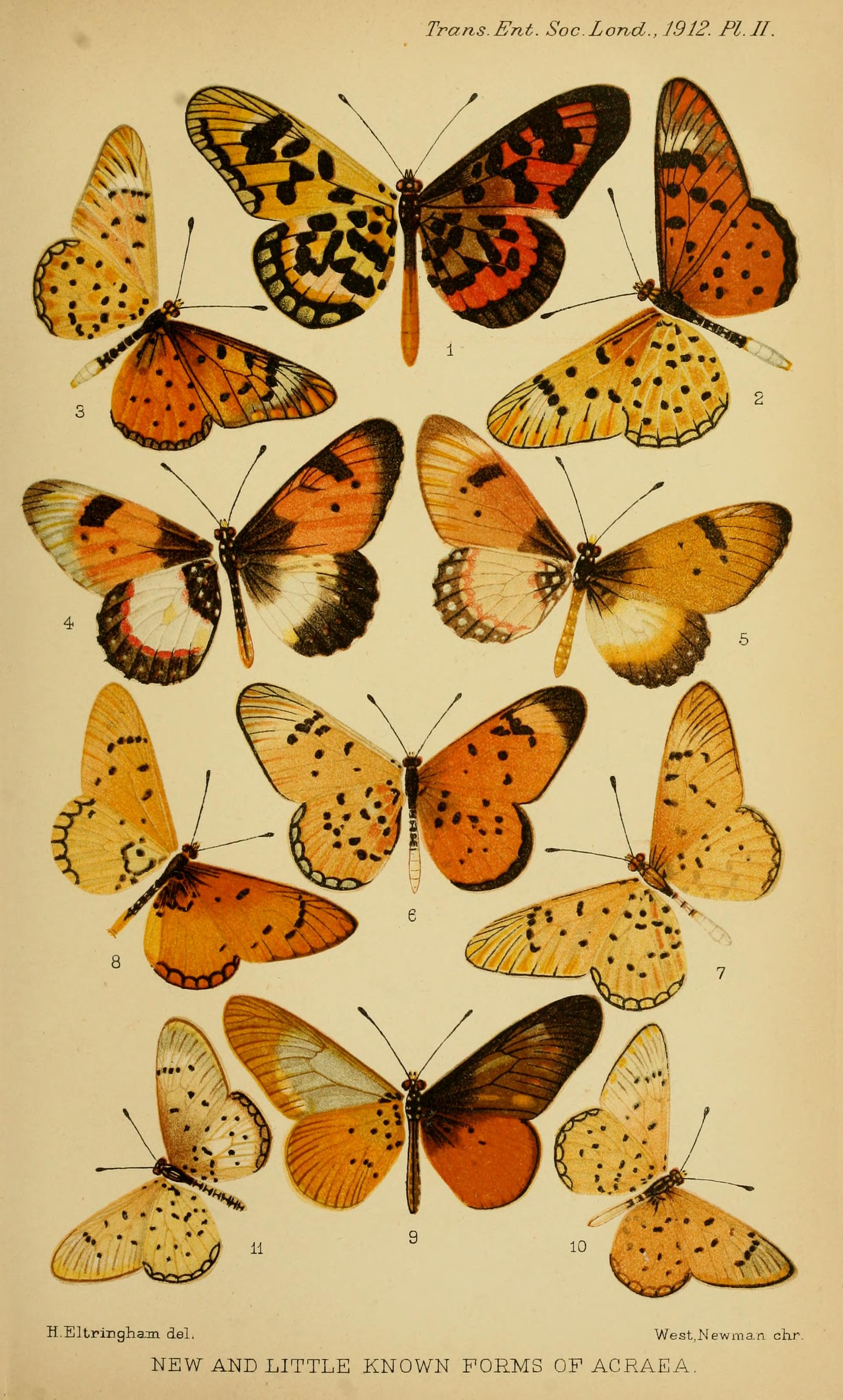
- Figure 7

Scientific classification
- Kingdom: Animalia
- Phylum: Arthropoda
- Class: Insecta
- Order: Lepidoptera
- Family: Nymphalidae
- Genus: Acraea
- Species: A. ella

Binomial name
- Acraea ella Eltringham, 1911

Synonyms
- Acraea (Acraea) ella

= Acraea ella =

Species of butterfly

Acraea ella, the Ella's acraea, is a butterfly in the family Nymphalidae. It is found in Angola and north-western Namibia.

== Description ==
A. ella Eltr. (60 b) is so similar to equatorialis that it is sufficient to mention the differences. Somewhat larger, expanse 50 to 60 mm.; forewing completely scaled without grey subapical band. Angola.

== Taxonomy ==
It is a member of the Acraea caecilia species group. See also Pierre & Bernaud, 2014.
