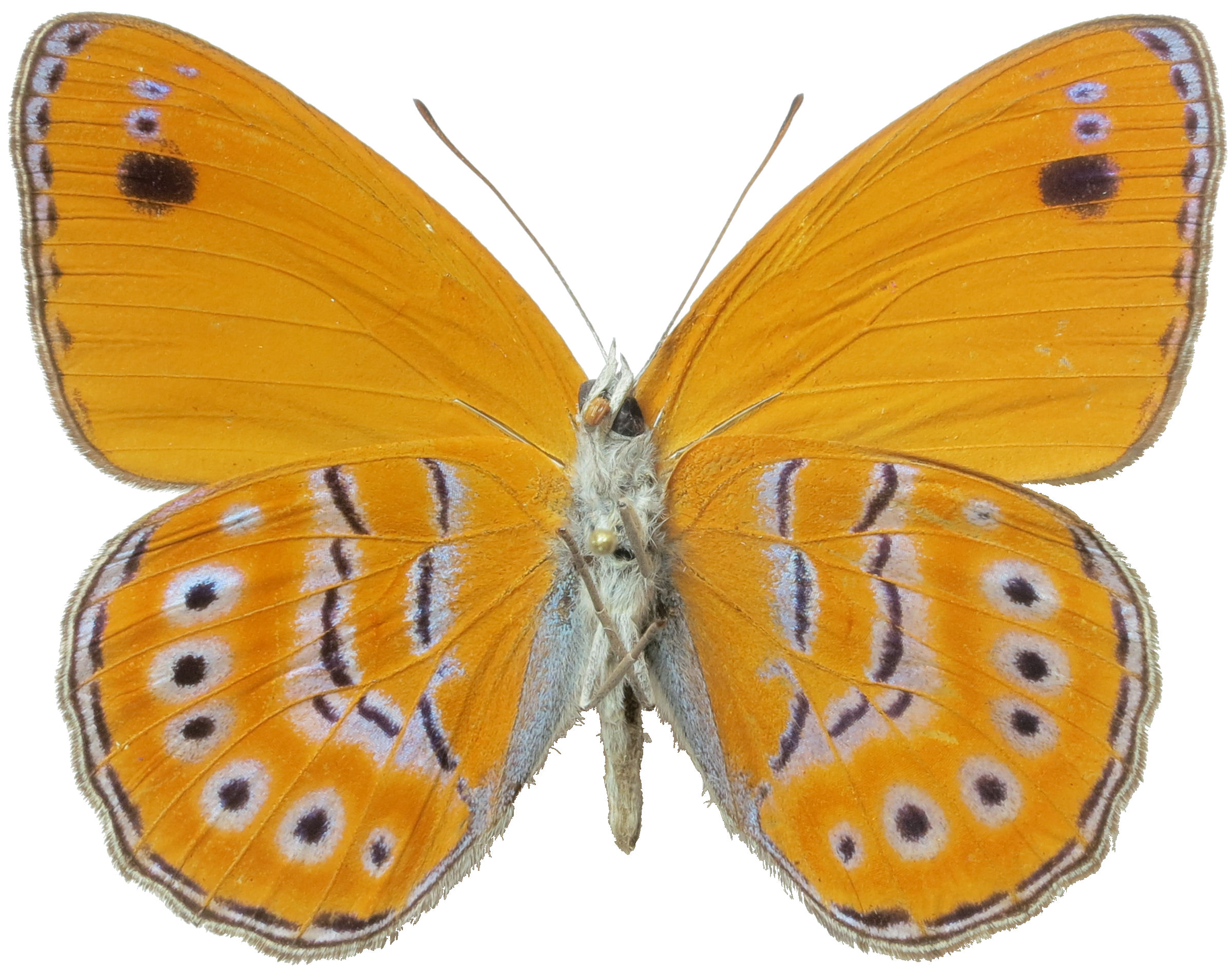
- Sevenia amulia ventral view

Scientific classification
- Kingdom: Animalia
- Phylum: Arthropoda
- Clade: Pancrustacea
- Class: Insecta
- Order: Lepidoptera
- Family: Nymphalidae
- Genus: Sevenia
- Species: S. amulia

Binomial name
- Sevenia amulia (Cramer, 1777)

Synonyms
- Papilio amulia Cramer, 1777; Sallya amulia; Asterope amulia intermedia Carcasson, 1961

= Sevenia amulia =

Species of butterfly

Sevenia amulia, the lilac tree nymph, is a butterfly in the family Nymphalidae. It is found in Nigeria, Cameroon, Gabon, the Republic of the Congo, the Democratic Republic of the Congo, Angola, Zambia and Botswana. The habitat consists of forests, especially near marshy areas.

Adults are on wing year round. It is a migratory species.

The larvae feed on Maprouna membranacea and Sapium species (including S. ellipticum).

== Subspecies ==
- Sevenia amulia amulia (Nigeria, Cameroon, Gabon, Congo, central and northern Democratic Republic of the Congo)
- Sevenia amulia intermedia (Carcasson, 1961) (Angola, north-western Zambia, Botswana, Democratic Republic of the Congo: Shaba, Lualaba, Lomami, Maniema and Sankuru)

Torben Larsen developed a species numbering system for his 2005 publication Butterflies of West Africa. The nominate subspecies is #841. The 'Larsen' numbers have since been used with permission in A Sharp Eye on Butterflies of Ghana.
