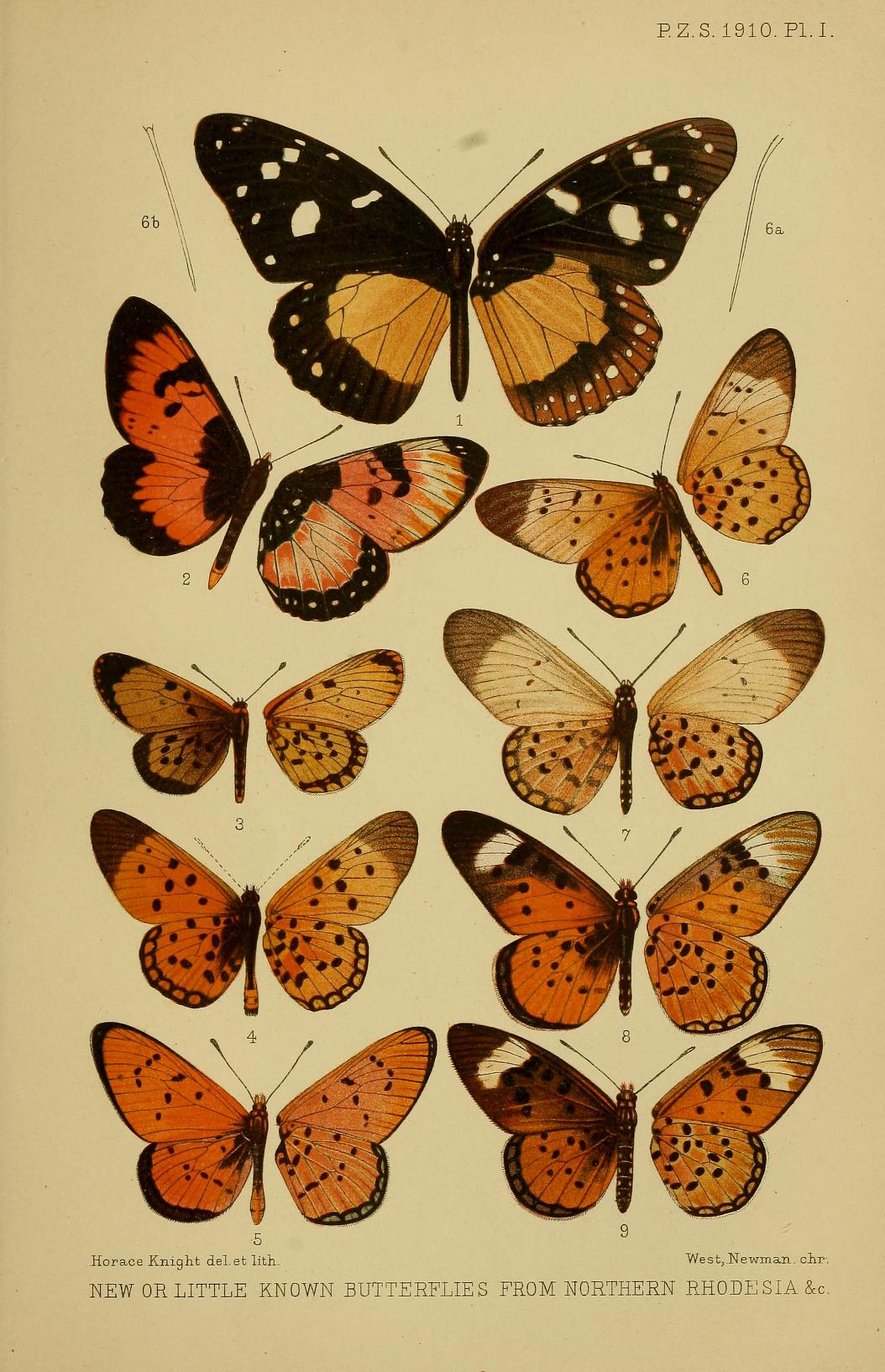
- Figures 6 and 6a

Scientific classification
- Kingdom: Animalia
- Phylum: Arthropoda
- Class: Insecta
- Order: Lepidoptera
- Family: Nymphalidae
- Genus: Acraea
- Species: A. pudorella

Binomial name
- Acraea pudorella Aurivillius, 1899

Synonyms
- Acraea caldarena var. pudorella Aurivillius, 1899; Acraea (Acraea) pudorella; Acraea detecta Neave, 1910; Acraea pudorella reducta Wichgraf, 1918; Acraea pudorella f. heringi Le Doux, 1923

= Acraea pudorella =

Species of butterfly

Acraea pudorella is a butterfly in the family Nymphalidae. It is found in Angola, Zambia, Tanzania, the coast of Kenya and Malawi.

== Description ==
A. pudorella Auriv. (55 d) is also very nearly allied to Acraea caldarena, of which I formerly regarded it as only a seasonal form. Eltringham has, however, pointed out that discal dot 2 on the hindwing is placed nearer to the base of cellule 2 in pudorella than in caldarena and that the male genitalia are differently formed. The type-form of pudorella further differs in having the forewing thinly scaled and entirely without the black apical spot. German and British East Africa; Abyssinia. -detecta Neave has a black apical spot 6 to 7 mm. in breadth on the upperside of the forewing and is consequently even more like caldarena. Rhodesia; Nyassaland and German East Africa.

== Taxonomy ==
It is a member of the Acraea caecilia species group. See also Pierre & Bernaud, 2014.
