= Ortholexis hollandi =

Scientific classification
- Kingdom: Animalia
- Phylum: Arthropoda
- Class: Insecta
- Order: Lepidoptera
- Family: Hesperiidae
- Genus: Ortholexis
- Species: O. hollandi

Binomial name
- Ortholexis hollandi H. H. Druce, 1909

Synonyms
- Loxolexis hollandi (H. H. Druce, 1909); Katreus dimidia f. karschi Evans, 1937; Katreus hollandi (H. H. Druce, 1909)

Species of butterfly

Ortholexis hollandi, commonly known as Holland's scarce sprite, is a species of butterfly in the family Hesperiidae. It is found in Liberia, Ivory Coast, Ghana, Nigeria, Cameroon, Angola, the Democratic Republic of the Congo and Zambia. The habitat consists of wetter forests.

The larvae feed on Strophanthus sarmentosus.
