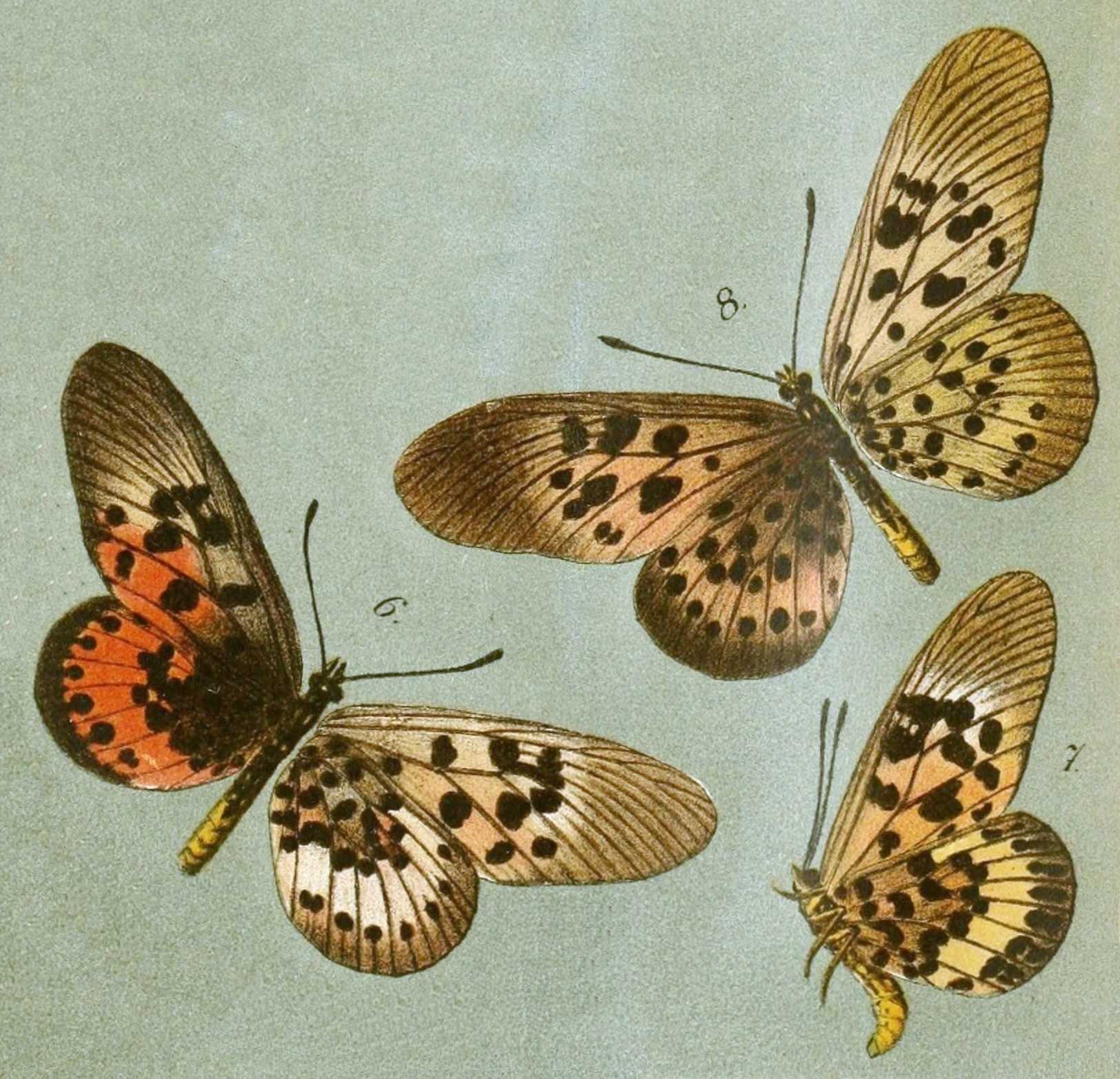

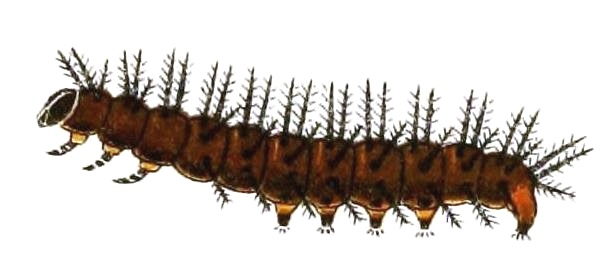
- Male (6., 7.) and female (8.) imagos in H. Dewitz (1889), and the larva of form lamborni illustrated in Eltringham (1912)

Scientific classification
- Kingdom: Animalia
- Phylum: Arthropoda
- Clade: Pancrustacea
- Class: Insecta
- Order: Lepidoptera
- Family: Nymphalidae
- Genus: Acraea
- Species: A. rogersi

Binomial name
- Acraea rogersi Hewitson, 1873

Synonyms
- Acraea (Acraea) rogersi; Acraea salambo Grose-Smith, 1887; Acraea ehmkei Dewitz, 1889; Acraea rogersi lamborni Eltringham, 1912

= Acraea rogersi =

Rogers' large acraea

Species of butterfly

Acraea rogersi, the Rogers' large acraea, is a butterfly in the family Nymphalidae which is native to the African tropics and northern subtropics.

== Range ==
It is found in Guinea, Sierra Leone, Liberia, Ivory Coast, Ghana, Togo, Nigeria, Cameroon, the Republic of the Congo, Angola, the Democratic Republic of the Congo, Uganda and Kenya.

== Description ==
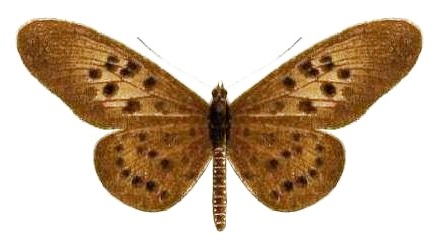
Acraea rogersi f. salambo in Seitz (1925)

A. rogersi is characterized by the presence of black submarginal dots at least in cellules 1b and 2 of both wings. The fore wing has a basal dot in 1b, a black spot in the cell, one at its apex and large discal dots in 1b to 6, of which those in 1b to 3 are placed in a straight line running parallel with the distal margin. The upperside of the hindwing is usually so much darkened at the base as far as the apex of the cell that the basal dots are not distinct, and has a broad black marginal band; beneath there are basal dots in 1a to 1c, 7 and 8 and two in the cell; the discal dots are usually present in all the cellules, but are irregularly arranged, the spots in 1c and 4 being placed nearer to the base than those next to them, a black dot on the middle discocellular; the submarginal dots are placed just before the marginal band and occur in the female in cellules 1b to 7, in the male often only in 1b to 3.

- rogersi Hew. Black above with a transverse band 8 to 9 mm. in breadth on the hind wing and a large spot at the hinder angle of the fore wing in cellules 1 a to 2 in the male red or red-yellow, in the female only indistinctly reddish. Sierra Leone to Angola.
- salambo Sm. (56 d). Both wings smoky brown above, more or less broadly relieved with yellowish grey in the middle. Among the type-form,
- lamborni Eltr. is similar to the preceding form, but has a dirty cream coloured transverse band on the upperside of the hindwing.

Larva black-brown with black spines and black head. Pupa light yellowish brown with fine black striae; head with two long, obtuse, divergent horns. Lagos.

== Subspecies ==
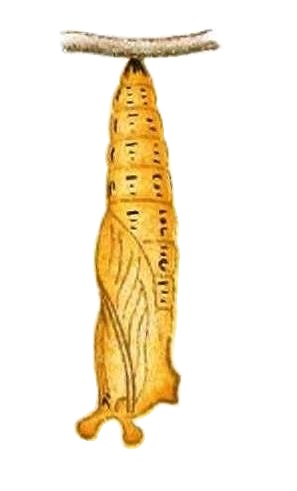
Pupa of A. rogersi f. lamborni in Eltringham (1912)

- Acraea rogersi rogersi – Guinea, Sierra Leone, Liberia, Ivory Coast, Ghana, Togo, Nigeria, Cameroon
- Acraea rogersi lankesteri Carpenter, 1941 — Uganda, south-western Kenya

Torben Larsen developed a species numbering system for his 2005 publication Butterflies of West Africa. The nominate subspecies is #1173. The 'Larsen' numbers have since been used with permission in A Sharp Eye on Butterflies of Ghana.

== Biology ==
The habitat consists of forests.

The larvae feed on Adenia lobata and Theobroma cacao.

== Taxonomy ==
It is a member of the Acraea terpsicore species group – but see also Pierre & Bernaud, 2014
