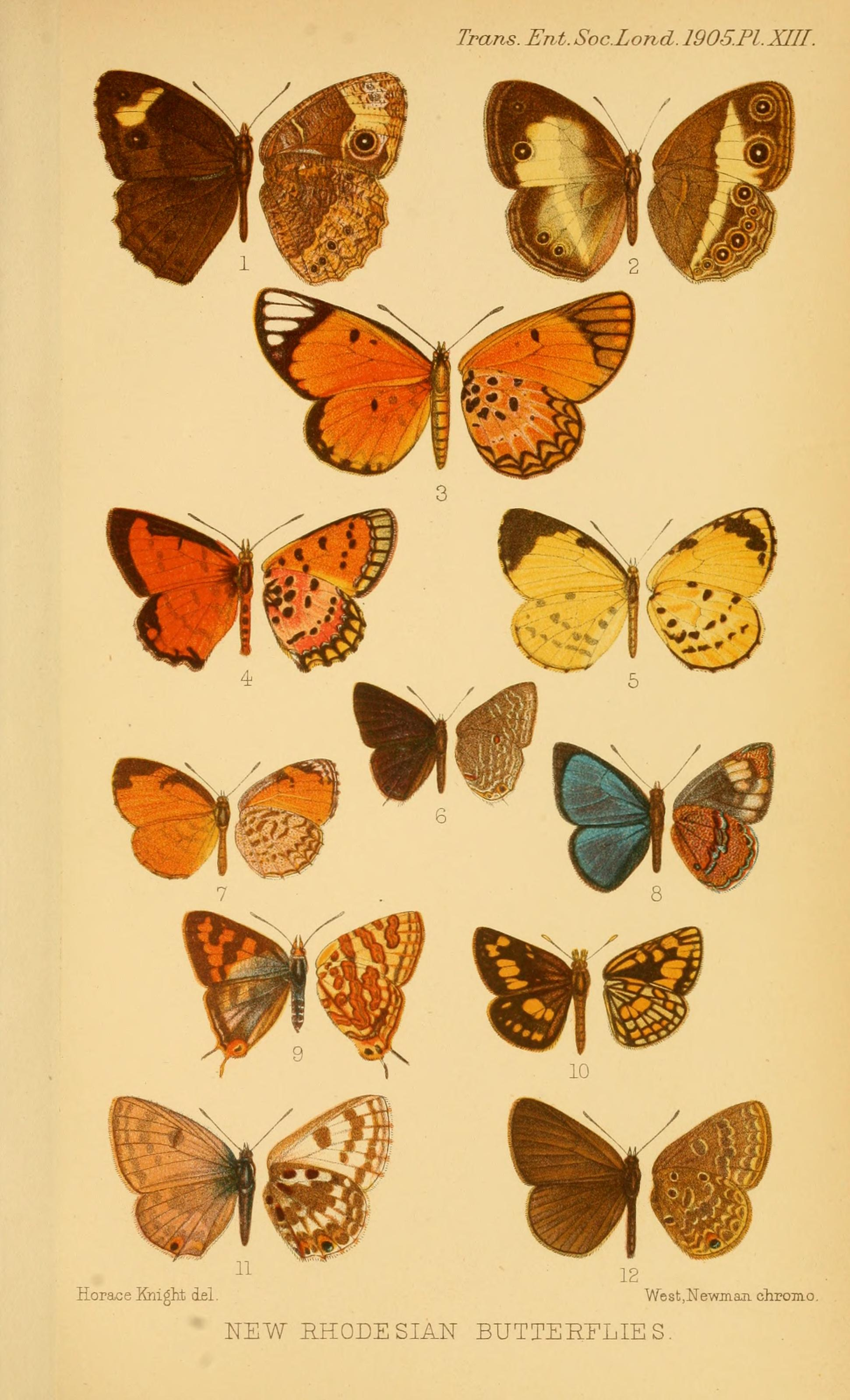
- Willema angolana figure 10

Scientific classification
- Kingdom: Animalia
- Phylum: Arthropoda
- Class: Insecta
- Order: Lepidoptera
- Family: Hesperiidae
- Genus: Willema
- Species: W. angolana

Binomial name
- Willema angolana (Karsch, 1896)

Synonyms
- Cyclopides angolana Karsch, 1896; Cyclopides cooksoni Druce, 1905; Metisella angolana (Karsch, 1896)

= Willema angolana =

Species of butterfly

Willema angolana is a species of butterfly in the family Hesperiidae. It is found in Angola, the Democratic Republic of the Congo (Shaba) and Zambia.

== Subspecies ==
- Willema angolana angolana - Angola, Zambia
- Willema angolana cooksoni (Druce, 1905) - Democratic Republic of the Congo (Shaba)
