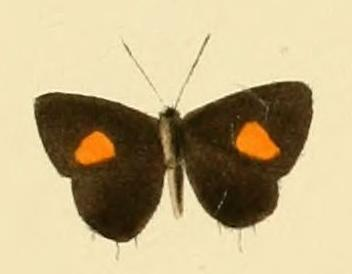

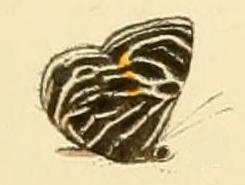

Conservation status
- Least Concern (IUCN 3.1)

Scientific classification
- Kingdom: Animalia
- Phylum: Arthropoda
- Clade: Pancrustacea
- Class: Insecta
- Order: Lepidoptera
- Family: Lycaenidae
- Genus: Neurellipes
- Species: N. lusones

Binomial name
- Neurellipes lusones (Hewitson, 1874)

Synonyms
- Lycaenesthes lusones Hewitson, 1874; Anthene (Neurellipes) lusones; Lycaenesthes maeander Plötz, 1880; Lycaena fulvimacula Mabille, 1890

= Neurellipes lusones =

Large red-spot ciliate blue

Species of butterfly

Neurellipes lusones, Anthene lusones, the large red-spot ciliate blue, is a butterfly in the family Lycaenidae. It is found in Guinea, Sierra Leone, Ivory Coast, Ghana, Nigeria, Cameroon, Gabon, the Republic of the Congo, Angola, the Central African Republic, the Democratic Republic of the Congo, Sudan, Uganda and Tanzania. The habitat consists of forests.

Torben Larsen developed a species numbering system for his 2005 publication Butterflies of West Africa. This species, described as Anthene lusones is #542. The 'Larsen' numbers have since been used with permission in A Sharp Eye on Butterflies of Ghana.
