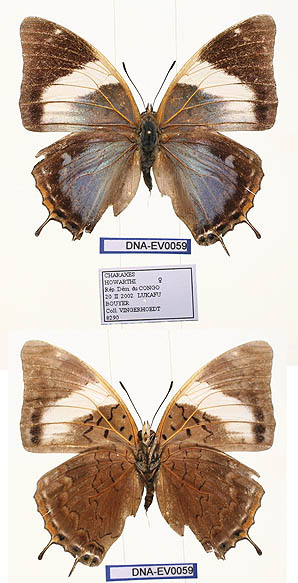

Scientific classification
- Kingdom: Animalia
- Phylum: Arthropoda
- Class: Insecta
- Order: Lepidoptera
- Family: Nymphalidae
- Genus: Charaxes
- Species: C. howarthi

Binomial name
- Charaxes howarthi Minig, 1976

= Charaxes howarthi =

Species of butterfly

Charaxes howarthi is a butterfly in the family Nymphalidae. It is found in Tanzania, northern Angola, northern Zambia and the Democratic Republic of the Congo (Shaba). The habitat consists of Brachystegia woodland and open forests.

The larvae feed on Brachystegia spiciformis and Albizia antunesiana.

Notes on the biology of howarthi are provided by Kielland (1990) and Larsen (1991)

The name honours Graham Howarth.

== Taxonomy ==
The male is very similar to both Charaxes manica and Charaxes chintechi
