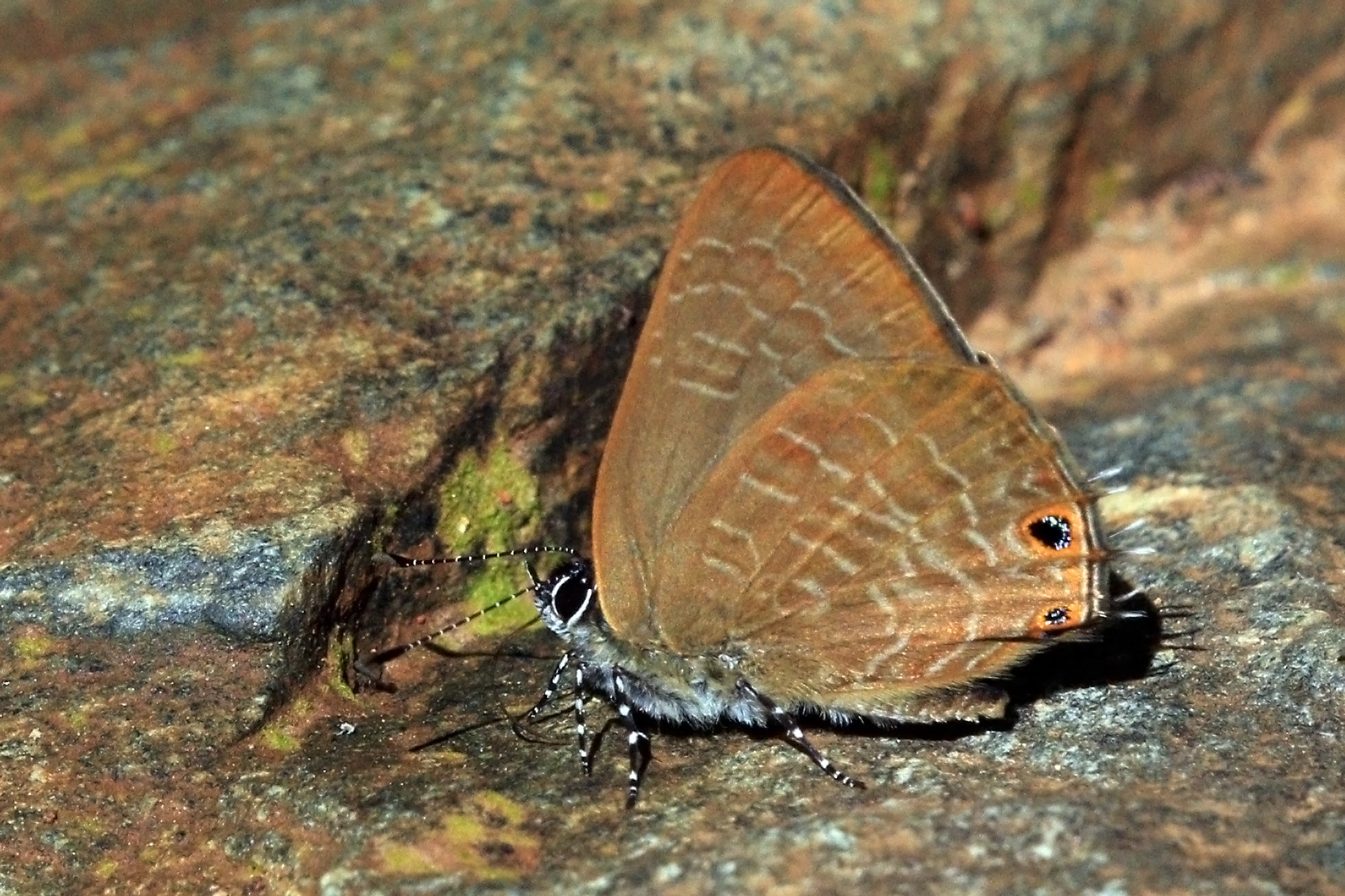
- male, Kakamega Forest, Kenya

Scientific classification
- Domain: Eukaryota
- Kingdom: Animalia
- Phylum: Arthropoda
- Class: Insecta
- Order: Lepidoptera
- Family: Lycaenidae
- Genus: Anthene
- Species: A. ligures

Binomial name
- Anthene ligures (Hewitson, 1874)

Synonyms
- Lycaenesthes ligures Hewitson, 1874; Anthene (Anthene) ligures; Lycaenesthes amanica Strand, 1909; Lycaenesthes ukerewensis ab. pauperula Strand, 1909; Lycaenesthes ochreofascia Talbot, 1935

= Anthene ligures =

Lesser indigo ciliate blue

Species of butterfly

Anthene ligures, the lesser indigo ciliate blue, is a butterfly in the family Lycaenidae. It is found in Ghana, Togo, Nigeria (south and the Cross River loop), Cameroon, Gabon, the Republic of the Congo, Angola, the Democratic Republic of the Congo, Uganda, western and central Kenya, Tanzania, Malawi and Zambia. The habitat consists of forests.
