= Afriodinia dewitzi =

Scientific classification
- Kingdom: Animalia
- Phylum: Arthropoda
- Class: Insecta
- Order: Lepidoptera
- Family: Riodinidae
- Genus: Afriodinia
- Species: A. dewitzi

Binomial name
- Afriodinia dewitzi (Aurivillius, 1899)

Species of butterfly

Afriodinia dewitzi is a butterfly in the family Riodinidae. It is found in the Democratic Republic of the Congo (Sankuru, Lomami and Lualaba), north-western Zambia and possibly Angola. The habitat consists of forests.

The larvae probably feed on Maesa species.
