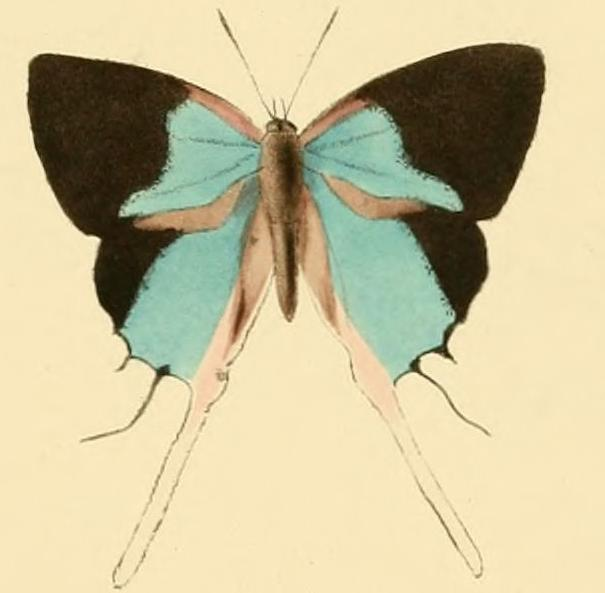

Scientific classification
- Kingdom: Animalia
- Phylum: Arthropoda
- Class: Insecta
- Order: Lepidoptera
- Family: Lycaenidae
- Genus: Iolaus
- Species: I. timon

Binomial name
- Iolaus timon (Fabricius, 1787)

Synonyms
- Papilio timon Fabricius, 1787; Iolaus (Tanuetheira) timon; Tanutheira prometheus Druce, 1891; Tanuetheira prometheus congoensis Joicey & Talbot, 1921

= Iolaus timon =

Species of butterfly

Iolaus timon, the long-tailed sapphire, is a butterfly in the family Lycaenidae. It is found in Guinea, Sierra Leone, Ivory Coast, Ghana, Togo, Nigeria, Cameroon, Gabon, the Republic of the Congo, Angola, the Democratic Republic of the Congo, Uganda and Tanzania. The habitat consists of forests.

Adults of both sexes have been recorded feeding from the large yellow flowers of asteraceous plants and the flowers of Poinsettia species.

The larvae feed on the flowers of Loranthus incanus, Phragmanthera capitata, Phragmanthera usuiensis and Phragmenthera polycrypta. They are dull green.

== Subspecies ==
- Iolaus timon timon (Guinea, Sierra Leone, Ivory Coast, Ghana, Togo, Nigeria: south and the Cross River loop, Cameroon, Gabon, Congo, northern Angola, Democratic Republic of the Congo)
- Iolaus timon congoensis (Joicey & Talbot, 1921) (Democratic Republic of the Congo: Uele, Kivu, Tshopo, Tshuapa, Equateur, Kinshasa, Sankuru and Tanganika)
- Iolaus timon orientius Hulstaert, 1924 (Uganda, north-western Tanzania)
