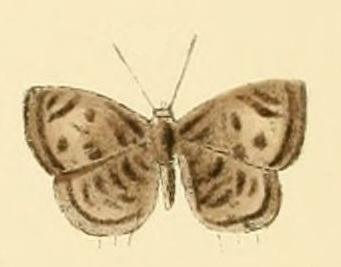

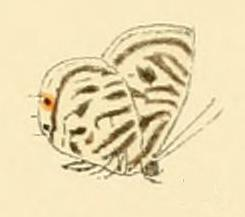

Scientific classification
- Kingdom: Animalia
- Phylum: Arthropoda
- Clade: Pancrustacea
- Class: Insecta
- Order: Lepidoptera
- Family: Lycaenidae
- Genus: Neurellipes
- Species: N. lyzanius

Binomial name
- Neurellipes lyzanius (Hewitson, 1874)

Synonyms
- Lycaenesthes lyzanius Hewitson, 1874; Anthene (Neurypexina) lyzanius; Anthene regillus Holland, 1891; Anthene turbatus Grose-Smith and Kirby, 1893

= Neurellipes lyzanius =

Black-patches

Species of butterfly

Neurellipes lyzanius, Anthene lyzanius, the black-patches, is a butterfly in the family Lycaenidae. It is found in Sierra Leone, Liberia, Ivory Coast, Ghana, Nigeria (south and the Cross River loop), Cameroon, Gabon, the Republic of the Congo and northern Angola.

The larvae have been found on the young shoots of an unidentified plant and are associated with the ant species Pheidole rotundata.

Torben Larsen developed a species numbering system for his 2005 publication Butterflies of West Africa. The species, described as Anthene lyzanius is #540. The 'Larsen' numbers have since been used with permission in A Sharp Eye on Butterflies of Ghana.
