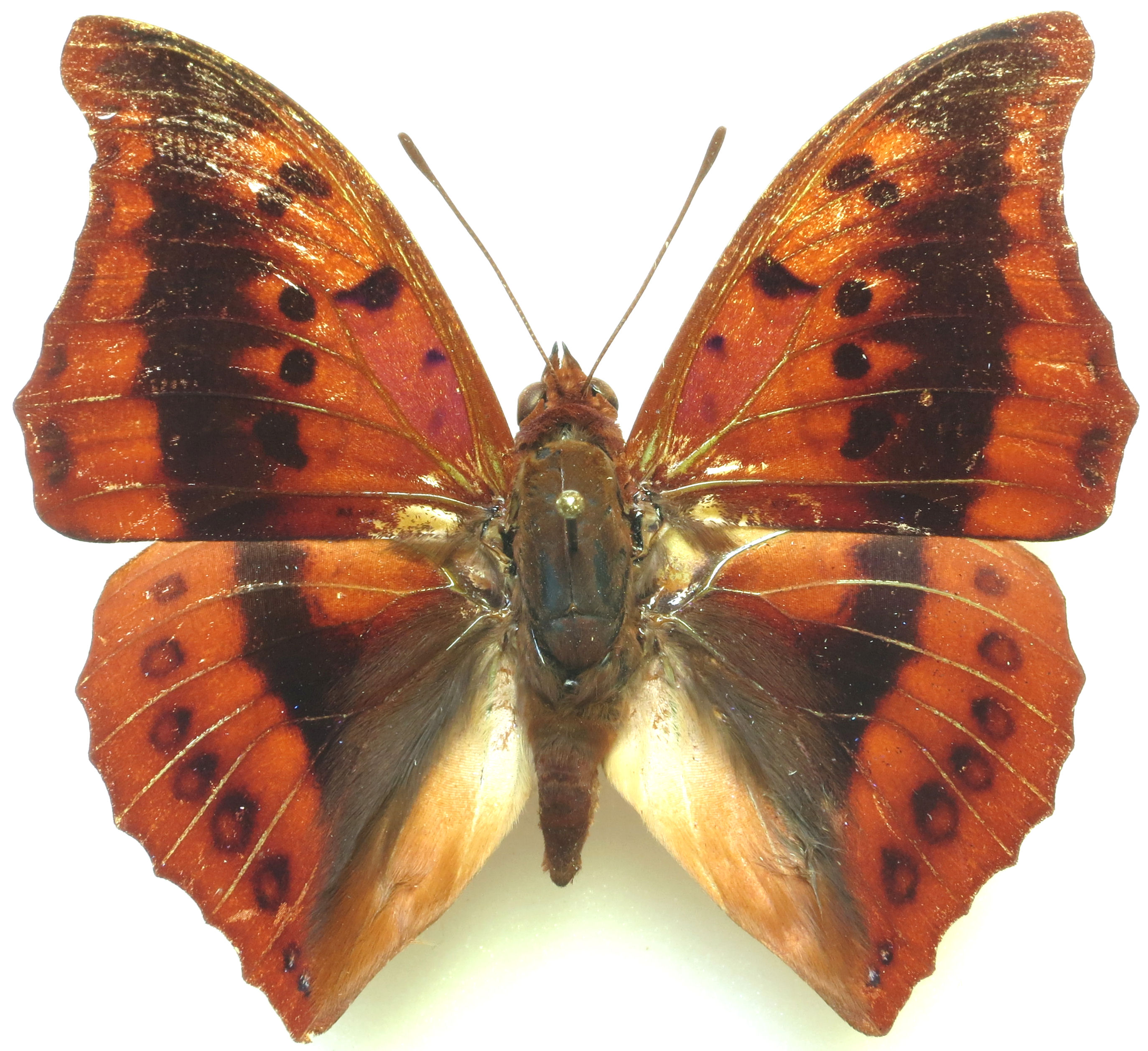
- C. n. nichetes from the CAR

Scientific classification
- Kingdom: Animalia
- Phylum: Arthropoda
- Clade: Pancrustacea
- Class: Insecta
- Order: Lepidoptera
- Family: Nymphalidae
- Genus: Charaxes
- Species: C. nichetes

Binomial name
- Charaxes nichetes Grose-Smith, 1883

Synonyms
- Charaxes hamatus Dewitz, 1884; Charaxes ogovensis Holland, 1886; Charaxes nichetes bouchei f. veronicae Plantrou, 1974; Charaxes leoninus Butler, 1895; Charaxes nichetes ssese f. bugalla Turlin and Lequeux, 2002

= Charaxes nichetes =

Species of butterfly

Charaxes nichetes, the Manx charaxes or water charaxes, is a butterfly in the family Nymphalidae. It is found in Guinea, Sierra Leone, Liberia, Ivory Coast, Ghana, Benin, Chad, Nigeria, Cameroon, Gabon, the Republic of the Congo, the Democratic Republic of the Congo, the Central African Republic, Uganda, Tanzania, Malawi, Mozambique, Zambia, Zimbabwe and Angola.

== Description ==
nichetes Group. male Distal margin of the fore wing emarginate, before the anal angle at the end of vein 2 strongly convex. Hindwing in the d produced to a point at the anal angle; distal margin curved and feebly dentate but without tail; in the female rounded at the anal angle and with a very short tail at vein 4. Ground-colour above orange-red with violet reflection. Ch. nichetes Smith wings above with a nearly straight black median band, extending from the costal margin of the forewing to the middle of vein 2 on the hindwing and about 4 mm. in breadth. Forewing with black discal spots in cellules 2–6, which are more or less completely united with the proximal side of the transverse band; hindwing inside the band broadly blackish. Forewing with dark marginal spots united into a band and hindwing with thick submarginal annulated spots. In the female the basal half of both wings above is almost as dark as the transverse band, which is consequently only bordered distally by the reddish yellow ground-colour; submarginal spots of the hindwing united into a light-spotted band 4mm. in breadth. Cameroons to Angola. - leoninus Btlr. differs from the type-form only in having the black markings much less developed. In the female they are even more reduced, the ground-colour much lighter orange-yellow and the distal margin of the hindwing uniformly rounded, without tails. Nyassaland. This species is easily identified by the absence of tails.

== Biology ==
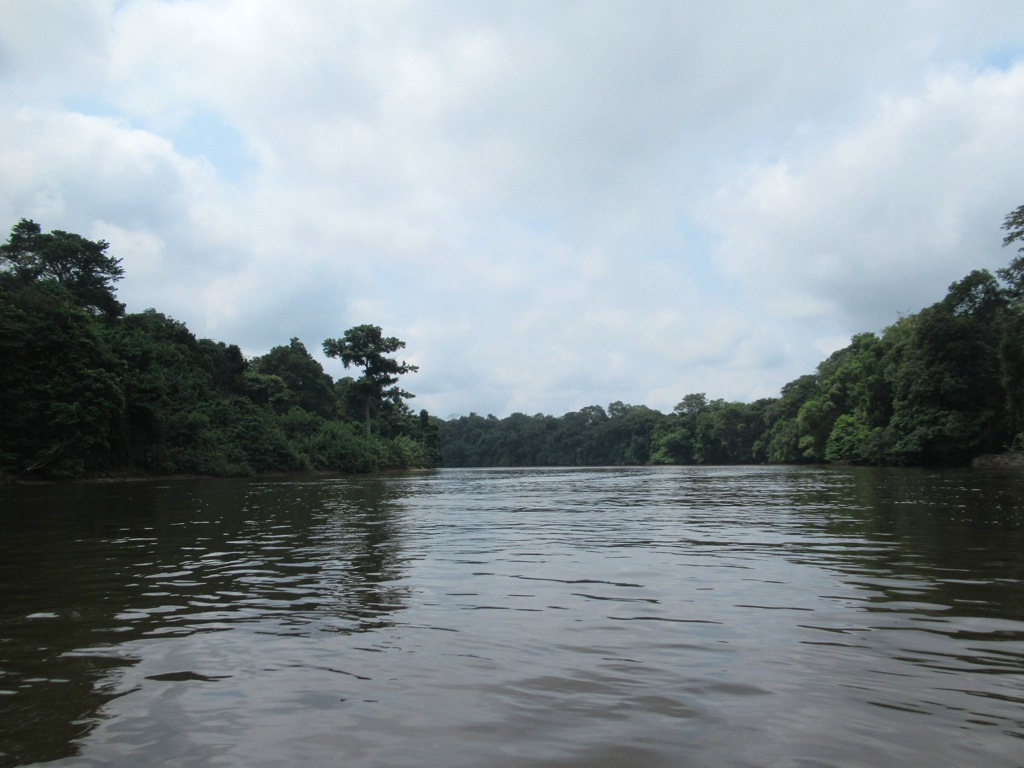
Habitat in Gabon

The habitat consists of forests, low altitude woodland savanna and Brachystegia woodland. Often near rivers and streams.

The larvae feed on Uapaca nitida, Uapaca kirkiana and Uapaca sansibarica.

Notes on the biology of nichetes are given by Pringle et al. (1994) and Kielland (1990).

== Subspecies ==
- C. n. nichetes (southern Nigeria, Cameroon, Gabon, Congo, northern Angola, northern Democratic Republic of the Congo, Central African Republic, Uganda: western and northern shores of Lake Victoria)
- C. n. bouchei Plantrou, 1974 (Sierra Leone, Liberia, southern Ivory Coast, Ghana, western Nigeria)
- C. n. leoninus Butler, 1895 (Democratic Republic of the Congo: Shaba, southern Tanzania, Malawi, Mozambique, eastern Zimbabwe)
- C. n. leopardinus Plantrou, 1974 (Guinea, north-eastern Ivory Coast, Benin, Nigeria, northern Cameroon, Chad)
- C. n. pantherinus Rousseau-Decelle, 1934 (Democratic Republic of the Congo, north-eastern Zambia, north-western Tanzania)
- C. n. ssese Turlin & Lequeux, 2002. (Uganda)

Torben Larsen developed a species numbering system for his 2005 publication Butterflies of West Africa. The subspecies bouchei is #. The 'Larsen' numbers have since been used with permission in A Sharp Eye on Butterflies of Ghana.

== Taxonomy ==
Charaxes nichetes is the sole member of species group Charaxes nichetes.
