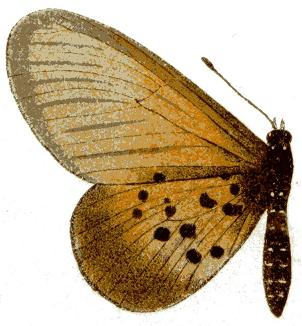

Scientific classification
- Kingdom: Animalia
- Phylum: Arthropoda
- Clade: Pancrustacea
- Class: Insecta
- Order: Lepidoptera
- Family: Nymphalidae
- Genus: Acraea
- Species: A. eugenia

Binomial name
- Acraea eugenia Karsch, 1893

Synonyms
- Acraea (Acraea) eugenia; Acraea eugenia var. ochreata Grünberg, 1910

= Acraea eugenia =

Species of butterfly

Acraea eugenia, the small smoky acraea , is a butterfly in the family Nymphalidae. It is found in Ghana (the Volta Region), Togo, western Nigeria, Cameroon, Equatorial Guinea, Angola, the Democratic Republic of the Congo (Tanganika) and Uganda.

== Description ==
A. eugenia Karsch (53 b). Forewing diaphanous or somewhat smoky and entirely without markings. Hindwing above whitish or slightly yellowish to the discal dots, with basal and discal dots but without submarginal ones; marginal band somewhat smoky and at least 6 mm. in breadth. Wings darker and more densely scaled; forewing with distinct transverse spot at the apex of the cell; hindwing from the base to beyond the middle scaled with yellow-brown on both surfaces. Spanish Guinea.

Torben Larsen developed a species numbering system for his 2005 publication Butterflies of West Africa. This species is #1186. The 'Larsen' numbers have since been used with permission in A Sharp Eye on Butterflies of Ghana.

== Biology ==
The habitat consists of open bushland near forests.

Adults are attracted to flowers.

== Etymology ==
The name honours Empress Eugénie.

== Taxonomy ==
It is a member of the Acraea terpsicore species group. But see also Pierre & Bernaud, 2014.

- Acraea (group horta) Henning, 1993, Metamorphosis 4 (1): 8
- Acraea (Acraea) (subgroup dammii) Pierre & Bernaud, 2013, Butterflies of the World 39: 5, pl. 17, f. 1-3
