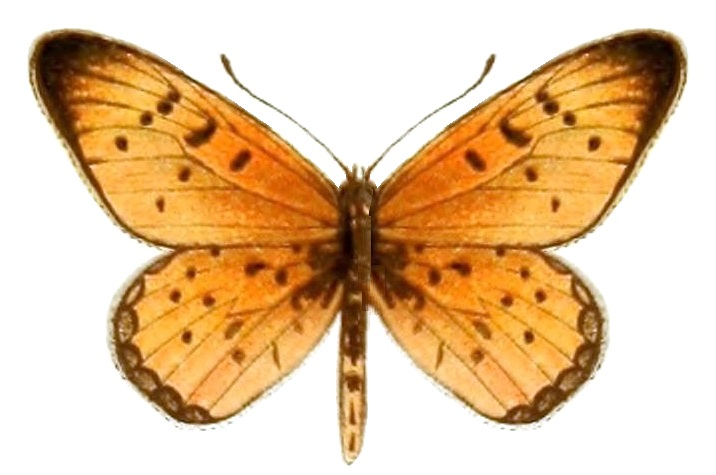
- Acraea leucopyga in Seitz (1925)

Scientific classification
- Kingdom: Animalia
- Phylum: Arthropoda
- Class: Insecta
- Order: Lepidoptera
- Family: Nymphalidae
- Genus: Acraea
- Species: A. leucopyga

Binomial name
- Acraea leucopyga Aurivillius, 1904

Synonyms
- Acraea (Acraea) leucopyga; Acraea liszti Suffert, 1904; Acraea leucopyga f. propagata Le Doux, 1923; Acraea leucopyga latiapicalis f. brunnea Overlaet, 1955; Acraea leucopyga latiapicalis f. albescens Overlaet, 1955

= Acraea leucopyga =

Species of butterfly

Acraea leucopyga is a butterfly in the family Nymphalidae. It is found in Zambia, Malawi, the Democratic Republic of the Congo (Shaba), Tanzania and Uganda.

== Description ==
A. leucopyga Auriv. (= liszti Suff.) (55 e). Forewing above bright orange-yellow to the base, in fresh specimens with rosy reflection; forewing above with black apical spot, 4 to 5 mm. in breadth, as far as vein 4 and then with very fine marginal line; discal dots 3 to 6 are free and placed in a straight line, almost vertical to the costal margin; hindwing above with sharply defined marginal band 1 to 2 mm. in breadth and discal dots which are not very distinct, often only showing through from beneath. Forewing beneath without black spot at the apex, but here whitish yellow with orange-yellow streaks on the interneural folds; hindwing beneath light grey-yellow with sharply prominent black dots and reddish spots at the base and between the veins and dots. The rainy-season form is smaller, less brightly coloured above, with dark tinge at the base and broader marginal band, not sharply defined proximally, on the upperside of the hindwing. Rhodesia and Nyassaland.

== Biology ==
The habitat consists of dry woodland and savanna.

== Taxonomy ==
It is a member of the Acraea caecilia species group. See also Pierre & Bernaud, 2014.
