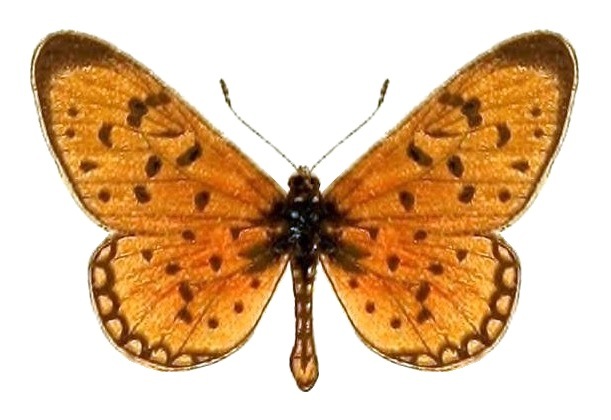
- A. asema in Seitz (1925)

Scientific classification
- Domain: Eukaryota
- Kingdom: Animalia
- Phylum: Arthropoda
- Class: Insecta
- Order: Lepidoptera
- Family: Nymphalidae
- Genus: Acraea
- Species: A. asema

Binomial name
- Acraea asema Hewitson, 1877

Synonyms
- Acraea (Acraea) asema; Acraea empusa Butler, 1894; Acraea asema f. despecta Le Doux, 1922; Acraea asema f. angustifasciata Le Doux, 1922; Acraea asema f. aspectasemoides Le Doux, 1922; Acraea asema f. dissimiloides Le Doux, 1922

= Acraea asema =

Speckled orange acraea

Species of butterfly

Acraea asema, the speckled orange acraea, is a butterfly in the family Nymphalidae which is native to the southern subtropics of Africa.

== Range ==
It is found in Angola, Zimbabwe, central and south-eastern Zambia, Malawi, Mozambique and southern Tanzania.

== Description ==
A. asema Hew. (55 a) is very similar to the preceding species,[ A. violarum ] but on an average somewhat smaller, 36-52 mm., with duller, more grey-yellow ground-colour and smaller black dots, the submarginal dots of the forewing in particular being smaller and rarely all present. Angola, Manicaland, Mashonaland and Nyassaland.

- f. gracilis Wichgr. [now forma of Acraea violarum] only differs in having the marginal band of the hindwing narrow, 1 mm. in breadth. Mashonaland.

== Biology ==
The habitat consists of dry deciduous woodland.

Adults are on wing year round.

The larvae feed on Tricliceras species.

== Taxonomy ==
It is a member of the Acraea cepheus species group.
