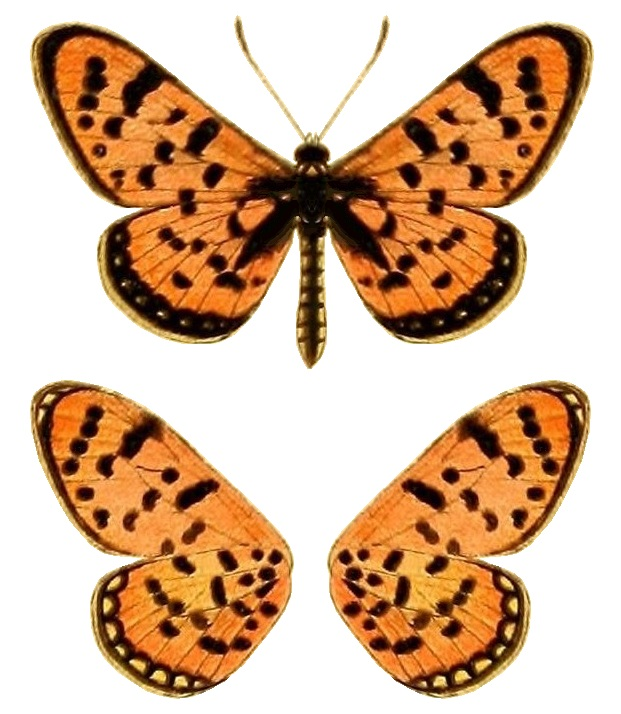
- Dorsal aspect of imago, and ventral aspect of wings

Conservation status
- Least Concern (IUCN 3.1)

Scientific classification
- Kingdom: Animalia
- Phylum: Arthropoda
- Class: Insecta
- Order: Lepidoptera
- Family: Nymphalidae
- Genus: Acraea
- Species: A. violarum

Binomial name
- Acraea violarum Boisduval, 1847

Synonyms
- Acraea (Acraea) violarum; Acraea nataliensis Angas, 1849; Acraea violarum gracilis Wichgraf, 1909; Acraea violarum f. assimiliora Le Doux, 1922; Acraea violarum f. assimilis Le Doux, 1922; Acraea violarum f. dissimilis Le Doux, 1922; Acraea violarum f. aspectasema Le Doux, 1922

= Acraea violarum =

Speckled red acraea

Species of butterfly

Acraea violarum, the speckled red acraea, is a butterfly of the family Nymphalidae which is native to southern Africa.

== Range ==
It is found in KwaZulu-Natal, Transvaal, Zimbabwe and southern Mozambique. It is a variable species with a number of described morphs including form violarum, form assimilis and form gracilis.

== Description ==
The wingspan is 40–48 mm for males and 43–55 mm for females. A. violarum Bdv. (55 a). Wings above with dull brick-red to grey-red to grey (female) ground-colour and large black dots; forewing with fine black marginal line, which is widened at the apex into a spot 2 mm. in breadth, and with 6 submarginal dots (in 1b to 6); both wings above more or less darkened at the base; marginal band of the hindwing with the proximal boundary lunulate; under surface almost as the upper, but the marginal band of the hindwing with large whitish spots and the forewing at the apex with small marginal spots of the same colour. South Africa to Angola and Mashonaland.

== Biology ==
Adults are on wing year round, with a peak from July to November.

The larvae feed on Basananthe sandersonii. Adults have been found feeding on flower nectar of Scabious species.

== Taxonomy ==
It is a member of the Acraea cepheus species group – but see also Pierre & Bernaud, 2014.
