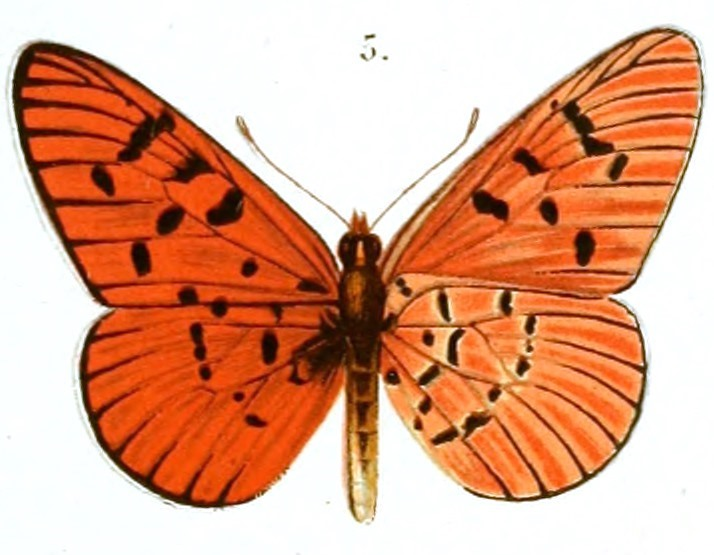
- Male, upper and underwing

Scientific classification
- Kingdom: Animalia
- Phylum: Arthropoda
- Clade: Pancrustacea
- Class: Insecta
- Order: Lepidoptera
- Family: Nymphalidae
- Genus: Acraea
- Species: A. atolmis

Binomial name
- Acraea atolmis Westwood, 1881

Synonyms
- Acraea (Acraea) atolmis; Acraea acontias Westwood, 1881; Acraea (Telchinia) luxi Rogenhofer, 1890; Acraea acontias ab. decora Weymer, 1901; Acraea atolmis ab. nigra Neustetter, 1916; Acraea atolmis f. westwoodi van Son, 1963

= Acraea atolmis =

Scarlet acraea

Species of butterfly

Acraea atolmis, the scarlet acraea, is a butterfly in the family Nymphalidae. It is found in western Zimbabwe, Botswana, northern Namibia, western Zambia, the southern and western part of the DRC and Angola.

== Description ==
Seitz Fauna Africana

A. atolmis Westw. agrees very closely with A. nohara and only differs essentially in having the veins of the hindwing black in the distal part and in the entire absence of the marginal band of the hindwing on both surfaces. Damaraland, Rhodesia, Angola and the southern Congo. - f. acontias Westw. (55 c as atolmis) is the rainy-season form and differs in having all the black dots larger and particularly in the hindwing having a distinct marginal band, though only 1 mm. in breadth, above unspotted, beneath enclosing narrow, transversely placed rectangular whitish marginal spots. The female has the ground-colour of both wings brown to black-grey. The aberratio form decora Weym. is a melanotic aberration in which the middle of the fore wing above is blackish.

== Biology ==
The habitat consists of deciduous woodland.

Adults are on wing year round.

The larvae feed on Triumfetta species.

== Taxonomy ==
It is a member of the Acraea cepheus species group. See also Pierre & Bernaud, 2014.
