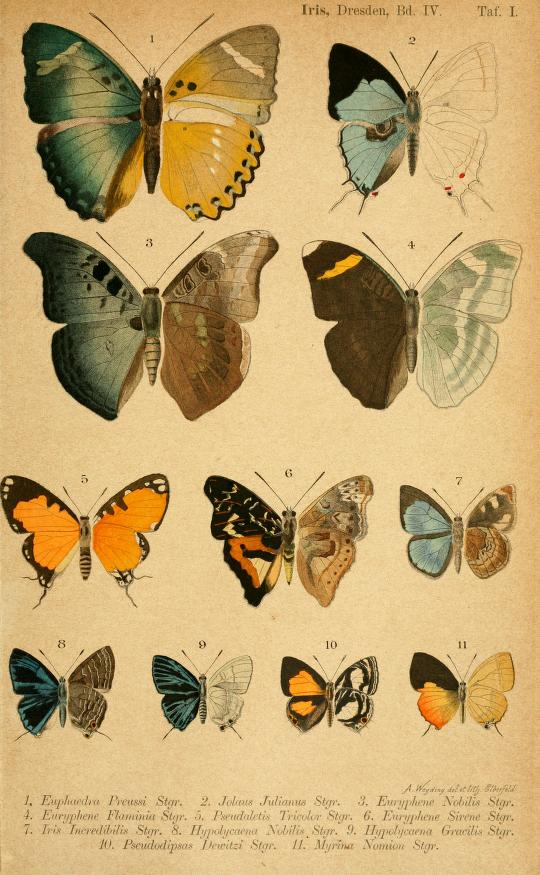
- Pilodeudorix camerona figure 8

Scientific classification
- Kingdom: Animalia
- Phylum: Arthropoda
- Clade: Pancrustacea
- Class: Insecta
- Order: Lepidoptera
- Family: Lycaenidae
- Subfamily: Theclinae
- Tribe: Deudorigini
- Genus: Pilodeudorix; H.H.Druce, 1891

Synonyms
- Actis Karsch, 1895; Diopetes Karsch, 1895; Hypokopelates H.H.Druce, 1891; Kopelates H.H.Druce, 1891

= Pilodeudorix =

Butterfly genus in family Lycaenidae

Pilodeudorix is a genus of butterflies in the family Lycaenidae. They are found in the Afrotropical realm.

== Species ==
- Pilodeudorix anetia (Hulstaert, 1924)
- Pilodeudorix angelita (Suffert, 1904)
- Pilodeudorix ankoleensis (Stempffer, 1953)
- Pilodeudorix aruma (Hewitson, 1873)
- Pilodeudorix aucta (Karsch, 1895)
- Pilodeudorix aurivilliusi (Stempffer, 1954)
- Pilodeudorix azurea (Stempffer, 1964)
- Pilodeudorix baginei (Collins & Larsen, 1991)
- Pilodeudorix bemba (Neave, 1910)
- Pilodeudorix caerulea (Druce, 1890)
- Pilodeudorix camerona (Plötz, 1880)
- Pilodeudorix canescens (Joicey & Talbot, 1921)
- Pilodeudorix catalla (Karsch, 1895)
- Pilodeudorix catori (Bethune-Baker, 1903)
- Pilodeudorix congoana (Schultze & Aurivillius, 1923)
- Pilodeudorix corruscans (Aurivillius, 1898)
- Pilodeudorix deritas (Hewitson, 1874)
- Pilodeudorix diyllus (Hewitson, 1878)
- Pilodeudorix ducarmei (Collins & Larsen, 1998)
- Pilodeudorix elealodes (Bethune-Baker, 1908)
- Pilodeudorix fumata (Stempffer, 1954)
- Pilodeudorix hamidou Libert, 2004
- Pilodeudorix hugoi Libert, 2004
- Pilodeudorix infuscata (Stempffer, 1964)
- Pilodeudorix kafuensis (Neave, 1910)
- Pilodeudorix kallipygos (Birket-Smith, 1960)
- Pilodeudorix kedassa (Druce, 1910)
- Pilodeudorix kiellandi (Congdon & Collins, 1998)
- Pilodeudorix kohli (Aurivillius, 1921)
- Pilodeudorix laticlavia (Clench, 1965)
- Pilodeudorix leonina (Bethune-Baker, 1904)
- Pilodeudorix mera (Hewitson, 1873)
- Pilodeudorix mimeta (Karsch, 1895)
- Pilodeudorix nirmo (Clench, 1965)
- Pilodeudorix nyanzana (Stempffer, 1957)
- Pilodeudorix obscurata (Trimen, 1891)
- Pilodeudorix otraeda (Hewitson, 1863)
- Pilodeudorix pasteon (Druce, 1910)
- Pilodeudorix pseudoderitas (Stempffer, 1964)
- Pilodeudorix rodgersi Kielland, 1985
- Pilodeudorix sadeska (Clench, 1965)
- Pilodeudorix tenuivittata (Stempffer, 1951)
- Pilodeudorix ula (Karsch, 1895)
- Pilodeudorix violetta (Aurivillius, 1898)
- Pilodeudorix virgata (Druce, 1891)
- Pilodeudorix zela (Hewitson, 1869)
- Pilodeudorix zeloides (Butler, 1901)
- Pilodeudorix zelomina (Rebel, 1914)
