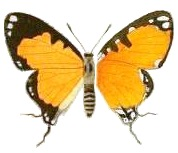

Scientific classification
- Domain: Eukaryota
- Kingdom: Animalia
- Phylum: Arthropoda
- Class: Insecta
- Order: Lepidoptera
- Family: Lycaenidae
- Genus: Pseudaletis
- Species: P. agrippina

Binomial name
- Pseudaletis agrippina H. H. Druce, 1888

Synonyms
- Sithon tricolor Staudinger, 1891; Pseudaletis tricolor; Pseudaletis ugandae Riley, 1928

= Pseudaletis agrippina =

Species of butterfly

Pseudaletis agrippina, the Agrippina's fantasy, is a butterfly in the family Lycaenidae. The species was first described by Hamilton Herbert Druce in 1888. It is found in Ivory Coast, Ghana, Togo, Nigeria, Cameroon, Angola, the Central African Republic, the Democratic Republic of the Congo, Sudan, Uganda and Tanzania. Its habitat consists of forests.

Adults mimic day-flying moths of the genus Scopula.

== Subspecies ==
- Pseudaletis agrippina agrippina (Ghana: Volta Region, Togo, Nigeria: south and the Cross River loop, Cameroon, Angola, Central African Republic, Democratic Republic of the Congo, southern Sudan, Uganda, north-western Tanzania)
- Pseudaletis agrippina warrengashi Libert, 2007 (Ivory Coast)
  (named in honour of Haydon Warren-Gash)
