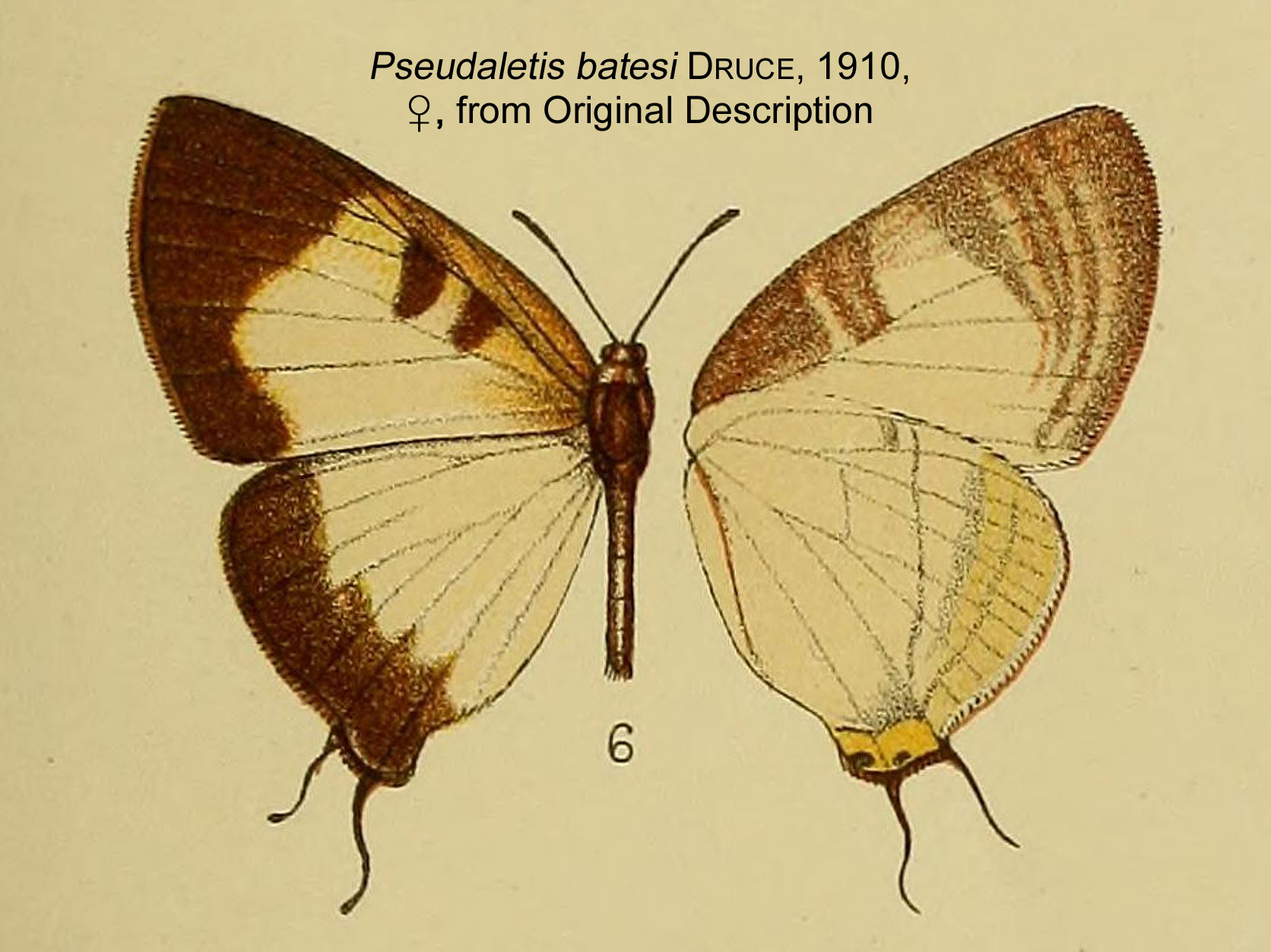

Scientific classification
- Domain: Eukaryota
- Kingdom: Animalia
- Phylum: Arthropoda
- Class: Insecta
- Order: Lepidoptera
- Family: Lycaenidae
- Genus: Pseudaletis
- Species: P. batesi

Binomial name
- Pseudaletis batesi H. H. Druce, 1910

= Pseudaletis batesi =

Black fantasy

Species of butterfly

Pseudaletis batesi, the black fantasy, is a butterfly in the family Lycaenidae. The species was first described by Hamilton Herbert Druce in 1910. It is found in Cameroon, the Republic of the Congo, the Central African Republic and the Democratic Republic of the Congo. The habitat consists of forests.

== Subspecies ==
- Pseudaletis batesi batesi (Cameroon, Congo, Central African Republic)
- Pseudaletis batesi zairensis Libert, 2007 (Democratic Republic of the Congo)
