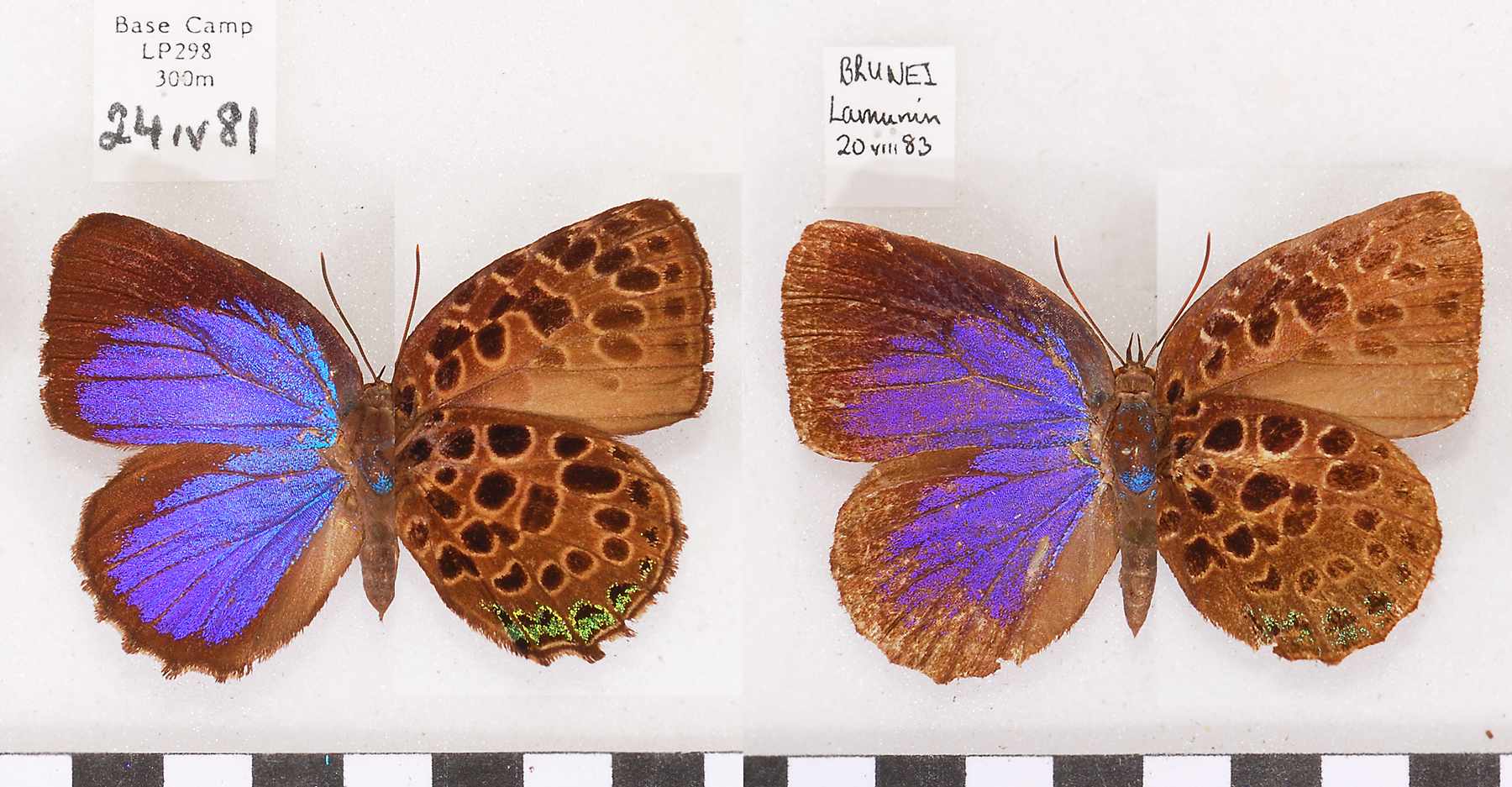

Scientific classification
- Kingdom: Animalia
- Phylum: Arthropoda
- Clade: Pancrustacea
- Class: Insecta
- Order: Lepidoptera
- Family: Lycaenidae
- Genus: Arhopala
- Species: A. kinabala

Binomial name
- Arhopala kinabala (H. H. Druce, 1895)

Synonyms
- Arhopala agesias var. kinabala H. H. Druce, 1895; Arhopala nabala Corbet, 1941

= Arhopala kinabala =

Species of butterfly

Arhopala kinabala is a species of butterfly belonging to the lycaenid family described by Hamilton Herbert Druce in 1895 . It is found in Southeast Asia (Borneo, Sumatra, Peninsular Malaya) The name refers to the type locality Kinabalu Park.

Original description Var. KINABALA, nov. Differs from the type by being generally larger and with the spots on the underside larger and darker and with an additional spot on the costa of the fore wing.Kina Balu (Waterstr.); Labuan (Low). This may prove to be a distinct species, but for the present I do not think it advisable to treat it as such.
