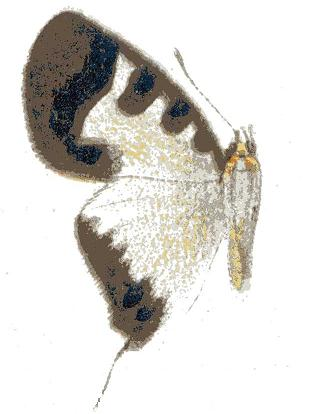

Scientific classification
- Domain: Eukaryota
- Kingdom: Animalia
- Phylum: Arthropoda
- Class: Insecta
- Order: Lepidoptera
- Family: Lycaenidae
- Genus: Pseudaletis
- Species: P. clymenus

Binomial name
- Pseudaletis clymenus (H. H. Druce, 1885)

Synonyms
- Spindasis clymenus H. H. Druce, 1885

= Pseudaletis clymenus =

Common fantasy

Species of butterfly

Pseudaletis clymenus, the common fantasy, is a butterfly in the family Lycaenidae. The species was first described by Hamilton Herbert Druce in 1885. It is found in western and eastern Nigeria, Cameroon, the Central African Republic and the Democratic Republic of the Congo. The habitat consists of forests.
