= Pilodeudorix virgata =

Scientific classification
- Kingdom: Animalia
- Phylum: Arthropoda
- Clade: Pancrustacea
- Class: Insecta
- Order: Lepidoptera
- Family: Lycaenidae
- Genus: Pilodeudorix
- Species: P. virgata

Binomial name
- Pilodeudorix virgata (H. H. Druce, 1891)

Synonyms
- Kopelates virgata H. H. Druce, 1891; Hypolycaena gracilis Staudinger, 1891

Species of butterfly

Pilodeudorix virgata, the small green-streaked playboy, is a butterfly in the family Lycaenidae. The species was first described by Hamilton Herbert Druce in 1891. It is found in Sierra Leone, Liberia, Ivory Coast, Ghana, Nigeria (south, east and the Cross River loop), Cameroon, Gabon, the Republic of the Congo, the Central African Republic, the northern half of the Democratic Republic of the Congo and Uganda. The habitat consists of forests.
