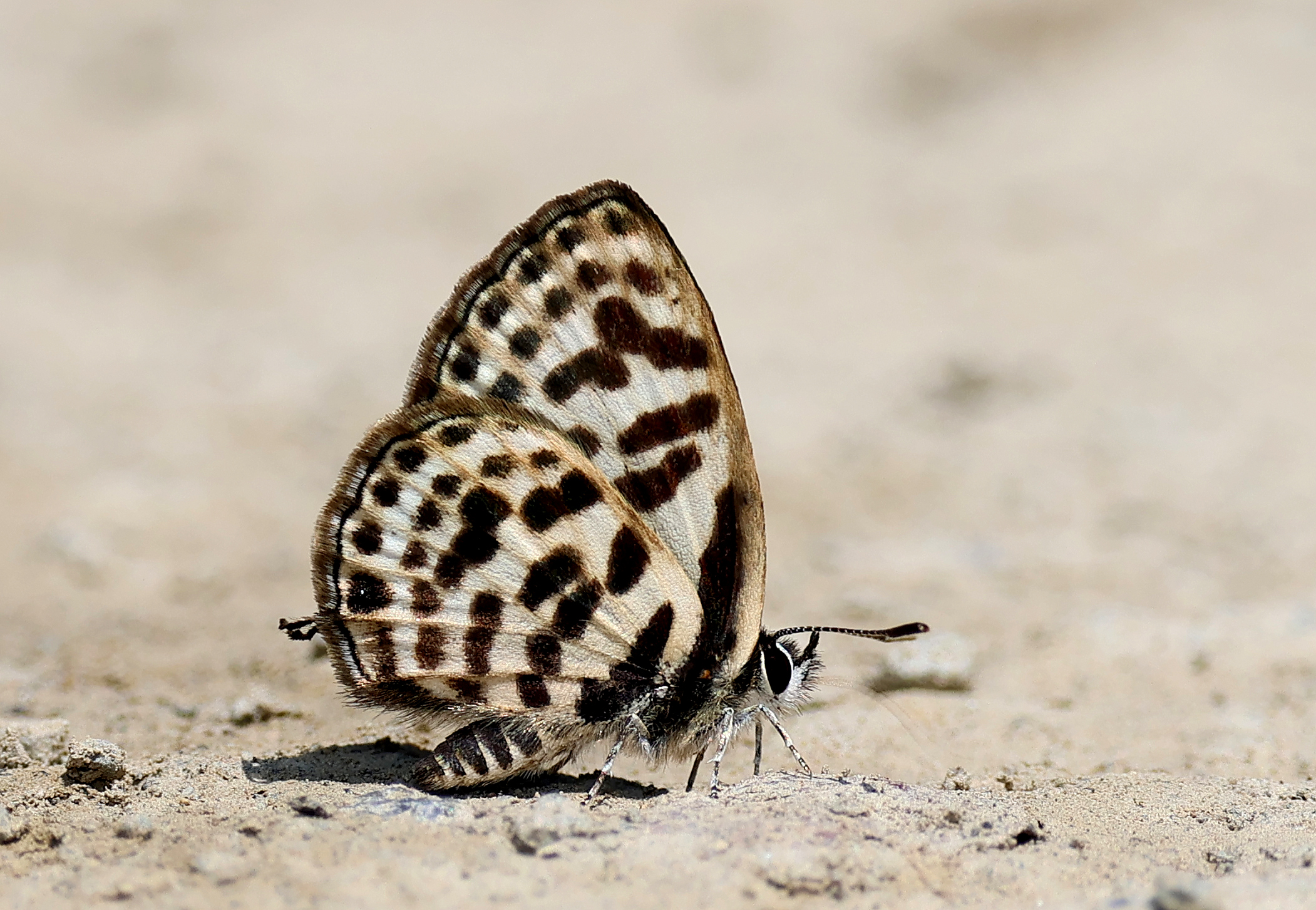

Scientific classification
- Domain: Eukaryota
- Kingdom: Animalia
- Phylum: Arthropoda
- Class: Insecta
- Order: Lepidoptera
- Family: Lycaenidae
- Genus: Tarucus
- Species: T. waterstradti

Binomial name
- Tarucus waterstradti H. H. Druce, 1895

Synonyms
- Tarucus dharta Bethune-Baker, [1918]; Castalius ananda vileja Fruhstorfer, 1918

= Tarucus waterstradti =

Species of butterfly

Tarucus waterstradti is a small butterfly found in the Indomalayan realm that belongs to the lycaenids or blues family. It was first described by Hamilton Herbert Druce in 1895.The name honours John Waterstradt.

The larva is found on Eugenia, (in association with Crematogaster ants).

== Subspecies ==
- T. w. waterstradti Borneo
- T. w. dharta Bethune-Baker, [1918] Sikkim, Assam, Myanmar, Thailand
- T. w. vileja (Fruhstorfer, 1918) Sumatra, Peninsular Malaya
- T. w. simillimus Schröder & Treadaway, 1985
