= Pilodeudorix kedassa =

Scientific classification
- Kingdom: Animalia
- Phylum: Arthropoda
- Class: Insecta
- Order: Lepidoptera
- Family: Lycaenidae
- Genus: Pilodeudorix
- Species: P. kedassa

Binomial name
- Pilodeudorix kedassa (H. H. Druce, 1910)

Synonyms
- Deudorix kedassa H. H. Druce, 1910

Species of butterfly

Pilodeudorix kedassa is a butterfly in the family Lycaenidae first described by Hamilton Herbert Druce in 1910. It is found in Cameroon.
