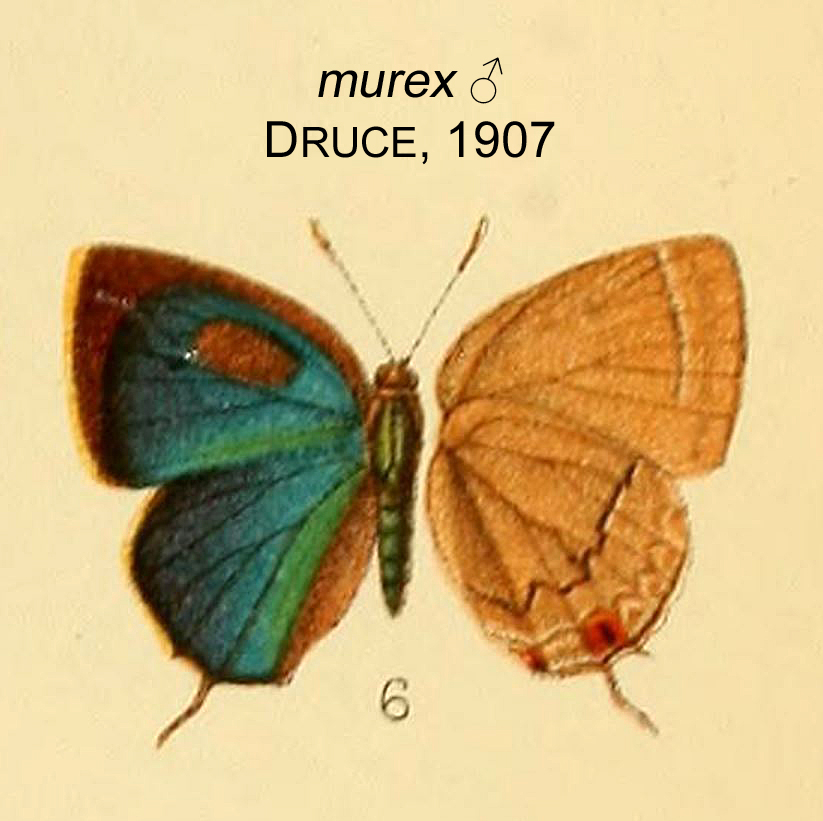
- Image accompanying the original description

Scientific classification
- Domain: Eukaryota
- Kingdom: Animalia
- Phylum: Arthropoda
- Class: Insecta
- Order: Lepidoptera
- Family: Lycaenidae
- Genus: Theclopsis
- Species: T. murex

Binomial name
- Theclopsis murex (H. H. Druce, 1907)

= Theclopsis murex =

Species of butterfly

Theclopsis murex is a Neotropical butterfly in the family Lycaenidae first described by Hamilton Herbert Druce in 1907. It is found in the Brazilian states of Rio Grande do Sul and Rio de Janeiro.
