= Pseudaletis arrhon =

Scientific classification
- Kingdom: Animalia
- Phylum: Arthropoda
- Class: Insecta
- Order: Lepidoptera
- Family: Lycaenidae
- Genus: Pseudaletis
- Species: P. arrhon

Binomial name
- Pseudaletis arrhon H. H. Druce, 1913

Species of butterfly

Pseudaletis arrhon is a butterfly in the family Lycaenidae first described by Hamilton Herbert Druce in 1913. It is found in Cameroon.
