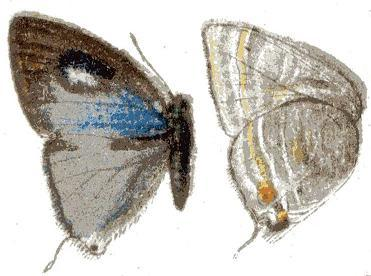
- Upperside (left) and underside

Scientific classification
- Domain: Eukaryota
- Kingdom: Animalia
- Phylum: Arthropoda
- Class: Insecta
- Order: Lepidoptera
- Family: Lycaenidae
- Genus: Pilodeudorix
- Species: P. caerulea

Binomial name
- Pilodeudorix caerulea (H. H. Druce, 1890)

Synonyms
- Deudorix caerulea H. H. Druce, 1890; Argiolaus hollandi Ehrmann, 1894

= Pilodeudorix caerulea =

Species of butterfly

Pilodeudorix caerulea, the blue-heart playboy, is a butterfly in the family Lycaenidae. The species was first described by Hamilton Herbert Druce in 1890. It is found in Senegal, the Gambia, Guinea, Sierra Leone, Burkina Faso, Liberia, Ivory Coast, Ghana, Nigeria (south and the Cross River loop), equatorial Africa, western Kenya and northern Tanzania. The habitat consists of savanna and dry forests.

Adults have been recorded feeding on nectar of various flowers, especially those of Tridax species and Eupatorium odorata. Adult males occasionally mud-puddle.
