= Pilodeudorix pasteon =

Scientific classification
- Domain: Eukaryota
- Kingdom: Animalia
- Phylum: Arthropoda
- Class: Insecta
- Order: Lepidoptera
- Family: Lycaenidae
- Genus: Pilodeudorix
- Species: P. pasteon

Binomial name
- Pilodeudorix pasteon (H. H. Druce, 1910)

Synonyms
- Deudorix pasteon H. H. Druce, 1910; Deudorix (Diopetes) bwamba Stempffer, 1962

Species of butterfly

Pilodeudorix pasteon is a butterfly in the family Lycaenidae first described by Hamilton Herbert Druce in 1910. It is found in Cameroon, the Democratic Republic of the Congo (from the north-eastern part of the country to the Ituri Rainforest) and western Uganda.
