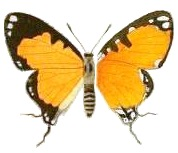
- P. agrippina

Scientific classification
- Domain: Eukaryota
- Kingdom: Animalia
- Phylum: Arthropoda
- Class: Insecta
- Order: Lepidoptera
- Family: Lycaenidae
- Subfamily: Aphnaeinae
- Genus: Pseudaletis; H. H. Druce, 1888

= Pseudaletis =

Fantasies

Butterfly genus in family Lycaenidae

Pseudaletis, commonly known as fantasies, is a genus of butterflies in the family Lycaenidae. The species of this genus are found in the Afrotropical realm.

== Species ==
- Pseudaletis abriana Libert, 2007
- Pseudaletis agrippina H. H. Druce, 1888
- Pseudaletis antimachus (Staudinger, 1888)
- Pseudaletis arrhon H. H. Druce, 1913
- Pseudaletis batesi H. H. Druce, 1910
- Pseudaletis bouyeri Collins & Libert, 2007
- Pseudaletis busoga van Someren, 1939
- Pseudaletis camarensis Collins & Libert, 2007
- Pseudaletis catori Bethune-Baker, 1926
- Pseudaletis clymenus (H. H. Druce, 1885)
- Pseudaletis cornesi Collins & Libert, 2007
- Pseudaletis dolieri Collins & Libert, 2007
- Pseudaletis ducarmei Libert, 2007
- Pseudaletis jolyana Libert, 2007
- Pseudaletis leonis (Staudinger, 1888)
- Pseudaletis lusambo Stempffer, 1961
- Pseudaletis malangi Collins & Larsen, 1995
- Pseudaletis mazanguli Neave, 1910
- Pseudaletis melissae Collins & Libert, 2007
- Pseudaletis michelae Libert, 2007
- Pseudaletis richardi Stempffer, 1952
- Pseudaletis rileyi Libert, 2007
- Pseudaletis taeniata Libert, 2007
- Pseudaletis zebra Holland, 1891
