= Pilodeudorix leonina =

Scientific classification
- Kingdom: Animalia
- Phylum: Arthropoda
- Clade: Pancrustacea
- Class: Insecta
- Order: Lepidoptera
- Family: Lycaenidae
- Genus: Pilodeudorix
- Species: P. leonina

Binomial name
- Pilodeudorix leonina (Bethune-Baker, 1904)

Synonyms
- Deudorix leonina Bethune-Baker, 1904; Hypokopelates dimitris d'Abrera, 1980

Species of butterfly

Pilodeudorix leonina, the dark round-spot, is a butterfly in the family Lycaenidae. It is found in Guinea, Sierra Leone, Ivory Coast, Ghana, Nigeria, Cameroon, the Republic of the Congo, the Central African Republic, the Democratic Republic of the Congo (Uele, Ituri and Sankuru) and Uganda. The habitat consists of primary forests and secondary forest with a closed canopy.

== Subspecies ==
- Pilodeudorix leonina leonina (Guinea, Sierra Leone, Ivory Coast, Ghana)
- Pilodeudorix leonina dimitris (d’Abrera, 1980) (Nigeria: south and the Cross River loop, western Cameroon)
- Pilodeudorix leonina indentata Libert, 2004 (south-eastern Cameroon, Congo, Central African Republic, Democratic Republic of the Congo, western Uganda)

Torben Larsen developed a species numbering system for his 2005 publication Butterflies of West Africa. The nominate subspecies is #468. The 'Larsen' numbers have since been used with permission in A Sharp Eye on Butterflies of Ghana.
