= Pilodeudorix kallipygos =

Scientific classification
- Kingdom: Animalia
- Phylum: Arthropoda
- Class: Insecta
- Order: Lepidoptera
- Family: Lycaenidae
- Genus: Pilodeudorix
- Species: P. kallipygos

Binomial name
- Pilodeudorix kallipygos (Birket-Smith, 1960)

Synonyms
- Hypokopelates kallipygos Birket-Smith, 1960

Species of butterfly

Pilodeudorix kallipygos is a butterfly in the family Lycaenidae. It is found in Cameroon. The habitat consists of primary forests.
