= Pseudaletis busoga =

Scientific classification
- Domain: Eukaryota
- Kingdom: Animalia
- Phylum: Arthropoda
- Class: Insecta
- Order: Lepidoptera
- Family: Lycaenidae
- Genus: Pseudaletis
- Species: P. busoga

Binomial name
- Pseudaletis busoga Van Someren, 1939

Species of butterfly

Pseudaletis busoga is a butterfly in the family Lycaenidae. It is found in Cameroon, the Democratic Republic of the Congo, Uganda and Tanzania. The habitat consists of forests.
