= Pilodeudorix infuscata =

Scientific classification
- Domain: Eukaryota
- Kingdom: Animalia
- Phylum: Arthropoda
- Class: Insecta
- Order: Lepidoptera
- Family: Lycaenidae
- Genus: Pilodeudorix
- Species: P. infuscata

Binomial name
- Pilodeudorix infuscata (Stempffer, 1964)

Synonyms
- Deudorix (Hypokopelates) infuscata Stempffer, 1964

Species of butterfly

Pilodeudorix infuscata is a butterfly in the family Lycaenidae. It is found in southern Nigeria, the Republic of the Congo, Uganda (from the western part of the country to Bwamba) and north-western Tanzania. The habitat consists of primary forests.
