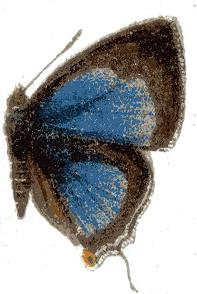
- Upperside
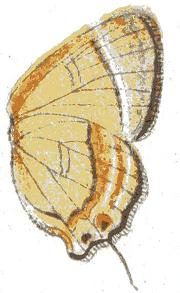
- Underside

Scientific classification
- Kingdom: Animalia
- Phylum: Arthropoda
- Clade: Pancrustacea
- Class: Insecta
- Order: Lepidoptera
- Family: Lycaenidae
- Genus: Pilodeudorix
- Species: P. bemba

Binomial name
- Pilodeudorix bemba (Neave, 1910)

Synonyms
- Deudorix bemba Neave, 1910

= Pilodeudorix bemba =

Species of butterfly

Pilodeudorix bemba is a butterfly in the family Lycaenidae. It is found in Zambia, the Democratic Republic of the Congo (Shaba) and south-western Tanzania.
