= Pilodeudorix tenuivittata =

Scientific classification
- Kingdom: Animalia
- Phylum: Arthropoda
- Class: Insecta
- Order: Lepidoptera
- Family: Lycaenidae
- Genus: Pilodeudorix
- Species: P. tenuivittata

Binomial name
- Pilodeudorix tenuivittata (Stempffer, 1951)

Synonyms
- Deudorix (Hypokopelates) tenuivittata Stempffer, 1951

Species of butterfly

Pilodeudorix tenuivittata is a butterfly in the family Lycaenidae. It is found in the Democratic Republic of the Congo, from the north-eastern part of the country to the Ituri Rainforest. The habitat consists of primary forests.
