= Pseudaletis melissae =

Scientific classification
- Kingdom: Animalia
- Phylum: Arthropoda
- Class: Insecta
- Order: Lepidoptera
- Family: Lycaenidae
- Genus: Pseudaletis
- Species: P. melissae

Binomial name
- Pseudaletis melissae Collins & Libert, 2007

Species of butterfly

Pseudaletis melissae is a butterfly in the family Lycaenidae. It is found in Cameroon.
