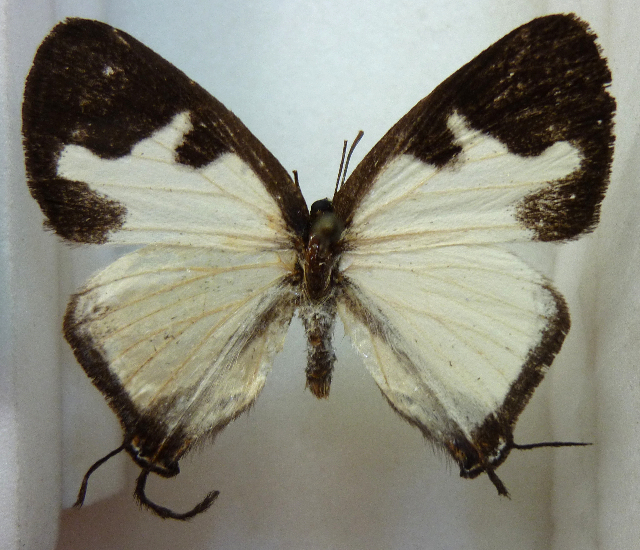

Scientific classification
- Domain: Eukaryota
- Kingdom: Animalia
- Phylum: Arthropoda
- Class: Insecta
- Order: Lepidoptera
- Family: Lycaenidae
- Genus: Pseudaletis
- Species: P. michelae

Binomial name
- Pseudaletis michelae Libert, 2007

= Pseudaletis michelae =

Species of butterfly

Pseudaletis michelae is a butterfly in the family Lycaenidae. It is found in Cameroon, the Republic of the Congo and the Democratic Republic of the Congo.
