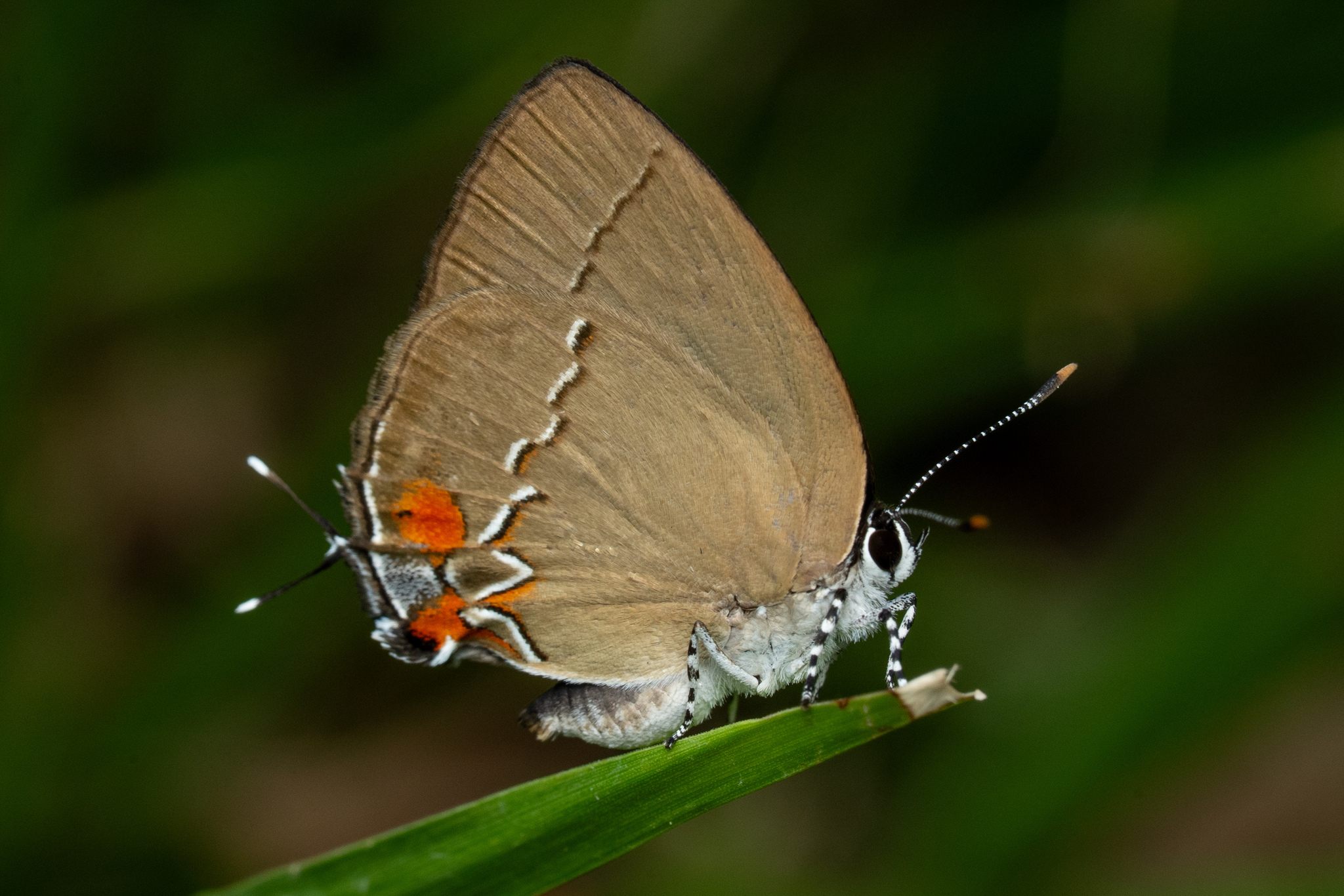

Scientific classification
- Kingdom: Animalia
- Phylum: Arthropoda
- Class: Insecta
- Order: Lepidoptera
- Family: Lycaenidae
- Genus: Theclopsis
- Species: T. gargara

Binomial name
- Theclopsis gargara (Hewitson, 1868)

= Theclopsis gargara =

Species of butterfly

Theclopsis gargara is a Neotropical butterfly in the family Lycaenidae. It is found in Brazil (Pará), Colombia, and Panama.
