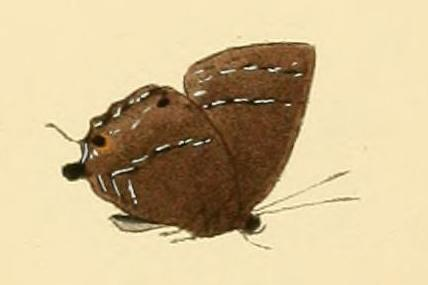

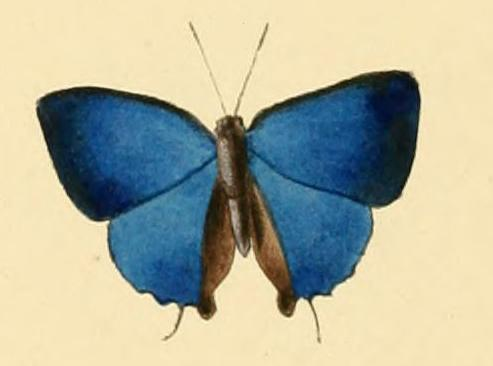

Scientific classification
- Domain: Eukaryota
- Kingdom: Animalia
- Phylum: Arthropoda
- Class: Insecta
- Order: Lepidoptera
- Family: Lycaenidae
- Genus: Pilodeudorix
- Species: P. deritas

Binomial name
- Pilodeudorix deritas (Hewitson, 1874)

Synonyms
- Deudorix deritas Hewitson, 1874

= Pilodeudorix deritas =

Species of butterfly

Pilodeudorix deritas, the small diopetes, is a butterfly in the family Lycaenidae. It is found in Ghana, Nigeria (the southern part of the country and the Cross River loop), Cameroon, the Republic of the Congo, Angola, the Central African Republic, the Democratic Republic of the Congo (Uele, Equateur and Kwango) and Uganda. The habitat consists of forests.

Both sexes are attracted to flowers.
