= Pseudaletis jolyana =

Scientific classification
- Domain: Eukaryota
- Kingdom: Animalia
- Phylum: Arthropoda
- Class: Insecta
- Order: Lepidoptera
- Family: Lycaenidae
- Genus: Pseudaletis
- Species: P. jolyana

Binomial name
- Pseudaletis jolyana Libert, 2007

Species of butterfly

Pseudaletis jolyana is a butterfly in the family Lycaenidae. It is found in Ghana.
