= Pseudaletis catori =

Cator's fantasy

Scientific classification
- Domain: Eukaryota
- Kingdom: Animalia
- Phylum: Arthropoda
- Class: Insecta
- Order: Lepidoptera
- Family: Lycaenidae
- Genus: Pseudaletis
- Species: P. catori

Binomial name
- Pseudaletis catori Bethune-Baker, 1926

Species of butterfly

Pseudaletis catori, the Cator's fantasy, is a butterfly in the family Lycaenidae. It is found in Togo and northern Nigeria. The habitat consists of forests.
