= Pilodeudorix aucta =

Scientific classification
- Domain: Eukaryota
- Kingdom: Animalia
- Phylum: Arthropoda
- Class: Insecta
- Order: Lepidoptera
- Family: Lycaenidae
- Genus: Pilodeudorix
- Species: P. aucta

Binomial name
- Pilodeudorix aucta (Karsch, 1895)

Synonyms
- Deudorix aucta Karsch, 1895

Species of butterfly

Pilodeudorix aucta, Karsch's diopetes, is a butterfly in the family Lycaenidae. It is found in Guinea (Nimbas), Ivory Coast (Nimbas), Ghana (the Volta Region), Togo, Nigeria (east and the Cross River loop) and western Cameroon.
