= Pseudaletis richardi =

Richard's fantasy

Scientific classification
- Domain: Eukaryota
- Kingdom: Animalia
- Phylum: Arthropoda
- Class: Insecta
- Order: Lepidoptera
- Family: Lycaenidae
- Genus: Pseudaletis
- Species: P. richardi

Binomial name
- Pseudaletis richardi Stempffer, 1952

Species of butterfly

Pseudaletis richardi, the Richard's fantasy, is a butterfly in the family Lycaenidae. It is found in Guinea, Ivory Coast, Ghana and Cameroon. The habitat consists of forests.

This species is thought to be at least partly nocturnal.
