= Pilodeudorix kohli =

Scientific classification
- Domain: Eukaryota
- Kingdom: Animalia
- Phylum: Arthropoda
- Class: Insecta
- Order: Lepidoptera
- Family: Lycaenidae
- Genus: Pilodeudorix
- Species: P. kohli

Binomial name
- Pilodeudorix kohli (Aurivillius, 1921)

Synonyms
- Deudorix kohli Aurivillius, 1921

Species of butterfly

Pilodeudorix kohli is a butterfly in the family Lycaenidae. It is found in the Republic of the Congo, the Democratic Republic of the Congo (Sankuru and Lualaba), Uganda and north-western Tanzania.
