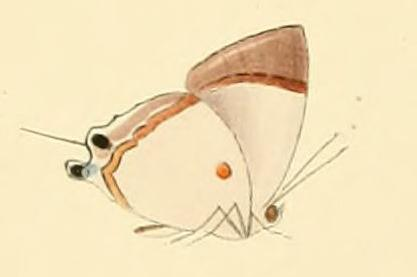

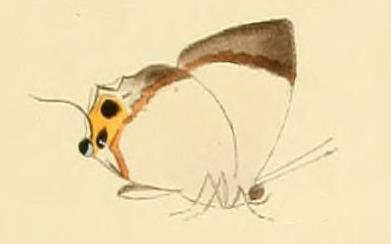

Scientific classification
- Domain: Eukaryota
- Kingdom: Animalia
- Phylum: Arthropoda
- Class: Insecta
- Order: Lepidoptera
- Family: Lycaenidae
- Genus: Pilodeudorix
- Species: P. otraeda

Binomial name
- Pilodeudorix otraeda (Hewitson, 1863)

Synonyms
- Myrina otraeda Hewitson, 1863; Myrina genuba Hewitson, 1875; Hypokopelates sevastopulo D’Abrera, 1980

= Pilodeudorix otraeda =

Species of butterfly

Pilodeudorix otraeda, the original round-spot, is a butterfly in the family Lycaenidae. It is found in Guinea, Sierra Leone, Ivory Coast, Ghana, Nigeria, Cameroon, Gabon, the Republic of the Congo, the Central African Republic, the Democratic Republic of the Congo, Uganda, Tanzania and Zambia. The habitat consists of primary forests.

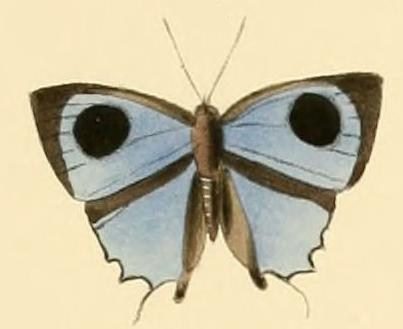

== Subspecies ==
- Pilodeudorix otraeda otraeda (Guinea, Sierra Leone, Ivory Coast, Ghana)
- Pilodeudorix otraeda genuba (Hewitson, 1875) (southern Nigeria, Cameroon, Gabon, Congo, Central African Republic, Democratic Republic of the Congo, western Uganda, western Tanzania, north-western Zambia)
