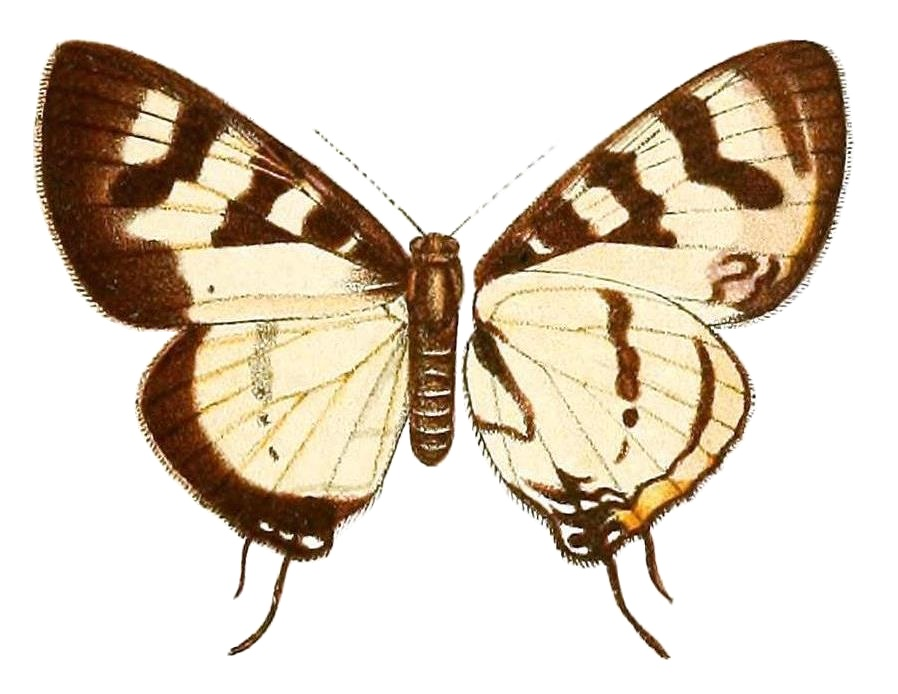
- Female in Neave (1910)

Scientific classification
- Kingdom: Animalia
- Phylum: Arthropoda
- Class: Insecta
- Order: Lepidoptera
- Family: Lycaenidae
- Genus: Pseudaletis
- Species: P. mazanguli

Binomial name
- Pseudaletis mazanguli Neave, 1910

= Pseudaletis mazanguli =

Species of butterfly

Pseudaletis mazanguli is a butterfly in the family Lycaenidae. It is found in the Democratic Republic of the Congo (from the south-eastern part of the country to Lualaba) and Zambia.
