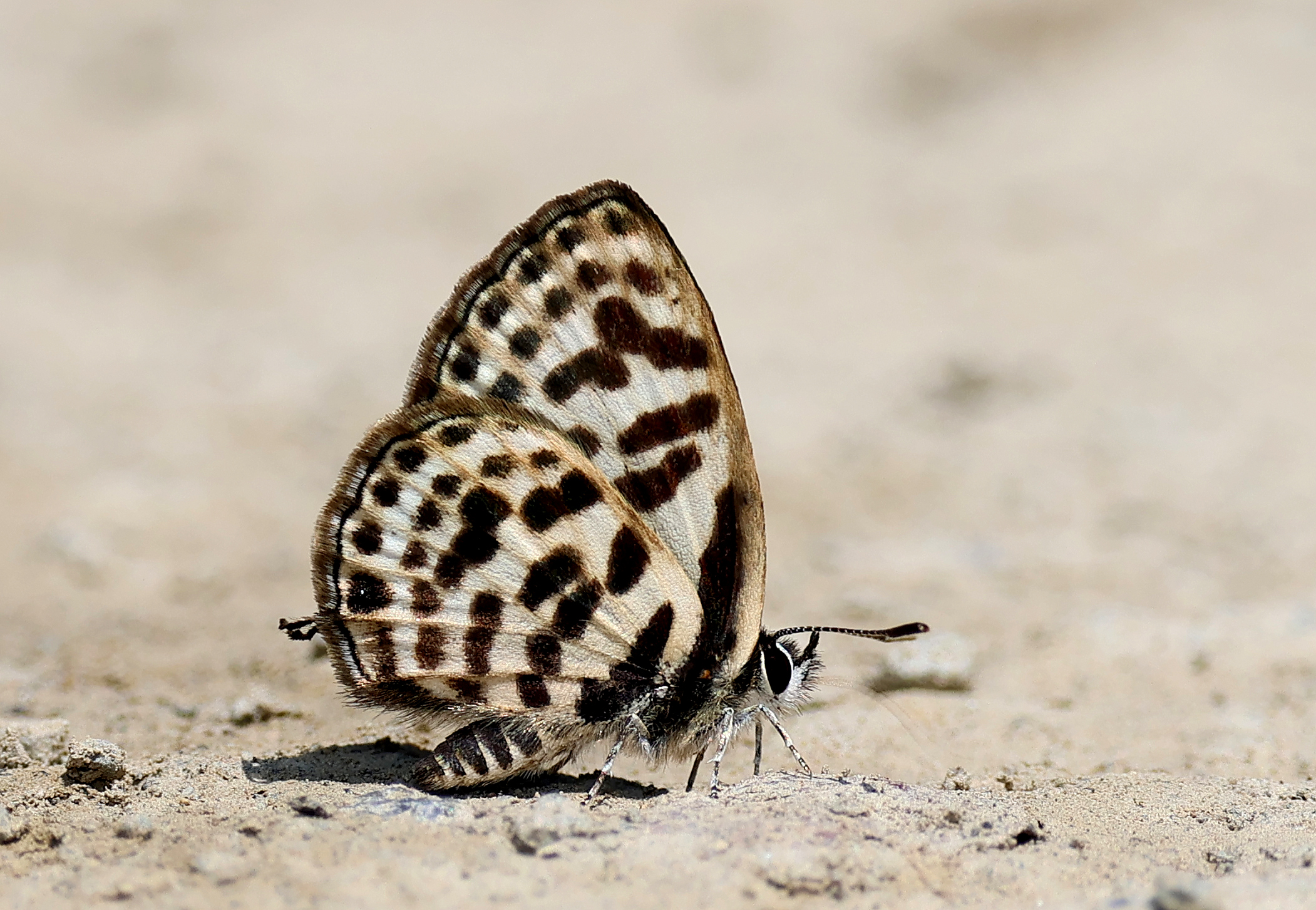

Scientific classification
- Kingdom: Animalia
- Phylum: Arthropoda
- Class: Insecta
- Order: Lepidoptera
- Family: Lycaenidae
- Genus: Tarucus
- Species: T. waterstradti
- Subspecies: T. w. dharta

Trinomial name
- Tarucus waterstradti dharta Bethune-Baker, 1918

Synonyms
- Tarucus dharta Bethune-Baker, 1918

= Tarucus waterstradti dharta =

Assam Pierrot

Subspecies of butterfly

Tarucus waterstradti dharta, the Assam Pierrot, is a small butterfly found in India that belongs to the lycaenids or blues family.

Formerly considered a distinct species, it is now generally regarded as a well-marked subspecies of T. waterstradti.

== See also ==
- List of butterflies of India
- List of butterflies of India (Lycaenidae)
