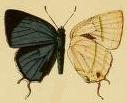

Scientific classification
- Kingdom: Animalia
- Phylum: Arthropoda
- Class: Insecta
- Order: Lepidoptera
- Family: Lycaenidae
- Genus: Pilodeudorix
- Species: P. elealodes

Binomial name
- Pilodeudorix elealodes (Bethune-Baker, 1908)

Synonyms
- Deudoryx elealodes Bethune-Baker, 1908; Hypokopelates ituri f. lineosa Joicey and Talbot, 1921; Deudorix mariana Hulstaert, 1924

= Pilodeudorix elealodes =

Species of butterfly

Pilodeudorix elealodes is a butterfly in the family Lycaenidae. It is found in the Democratic Republic of the Congo (Uele and Tshopo). The habitat consists of primary forests.
