= Pilodeudorix ula =

Scientific classification
- Domain: Eukaryota
- Kingdom: Animalia
- Phylum: Arthropoda
- Class: Insecta
- Order: Lepidoptera
- Family: Lycaenidae
- Genus: Pilodeudorix
- Species: P. ula

Binomial name
- Pilodeudorix ula (Karsch, 1895)

Synonyms
- Actis ula Karsch, 1895; Deudorix ula ab. nigrostriata Aurivillius, 1923

Species of butterfly

Pilodeudorix ula, the cobalt playboy, is a butterfly in the family Lycaenidae. It is found in Nigeria (west and the Cross River loop), Cameroon, Gabon, the Republic of the Congo, the Central African Republic, the Democratic Republic of the Congo and western Uganda. The habitat consists of primary forests.

== Images ==
External images from Royal Museum of Central Africa.
