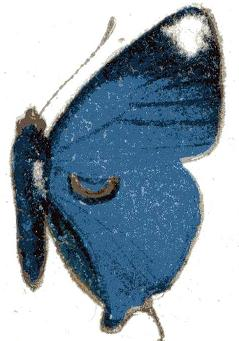
- Upperside
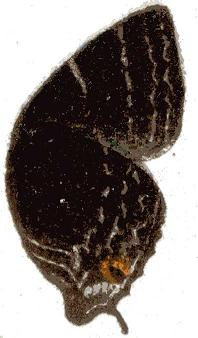
- Underside

Scientific classification
- Domain: Eukaryota
- Kingdom: Animalia
- Phylum: Arthropoda
- Class: Insecta
- Order: Lepidoptera
- Family: Lycaenidae
- Genus: Pilodeudorix
- Species: P. corruscans

Binomial name
- Pilodeudorix corruscans (Aurivillius, 1898)

Synonyms
- Deudorix corruscans Aurivillius, 1898; Diopetes kakumi Larsen, 1994

= Pilodeudorix corruscans =

Species of butterfly

Pilodeudorix corruscans, the Kakum diopetes, is a butterfly in the family Lycaenidae. It is found in Ivory Coast, Ghana, Cameroon, Gabon, the Central African Republic, the Democratic Republic of the Congo (from the north-eastern part of the country to Ituri and Lualaba) and Tanzania (the Kigoma District). The habitat consists of forests.

== Subspecies ==
- Pilodeudorix corruscans corruscans (Cameroon, Gabon, Central African Republic, Democratic Republic of the Congo: north-east to Ituri and Lualaba, Tanzania: Kigoma District)
- Pilodeudorix corruscans kakumi (Larsen, 1994) (Ivory Coast, Ghana)
