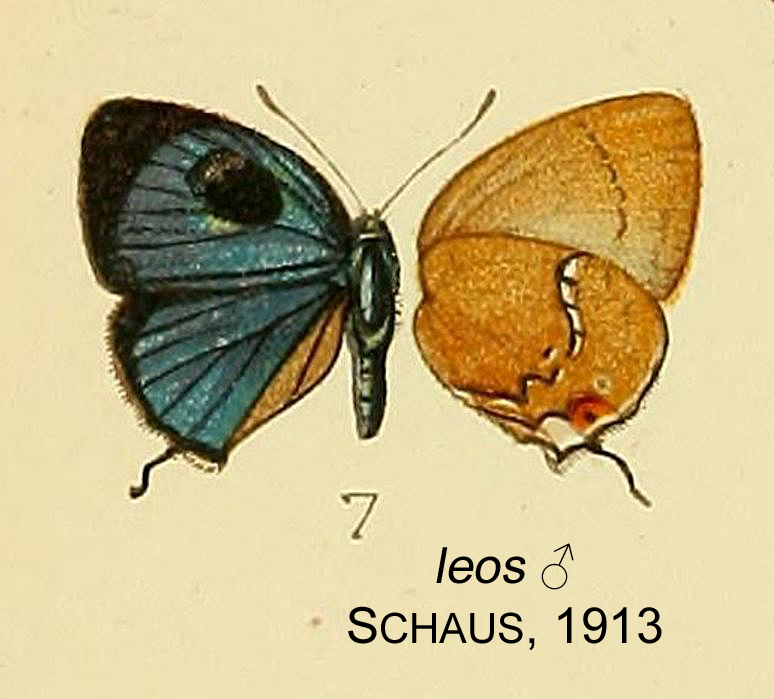
- Theclopsis leos as Thecla leos, from original description.

Scientific classification
- Domain: Eukaryota
- Kingdom: Animalia
- Phylum: Arthropoda
- Class: Insecta
- Order: Lepidoptera
- Family: Lycaenidae
- Genus: Theclopsis
- Species: T. leos

Binomial name
- Theclopsis leos (Schaus, 1913)

= Theclopsis leos =

Species of butterfly

Theclopsis leos is a Neotropical butterfly in the family Lycaenidae.
