= Pilodeudorix catalla =

Scientific classification
- Domain: Eukaryota
- Kingdom: Animalia
- Phylum: Arthropoda
- Class: Insecta
- Order: Lepidoptera
- Family: Lycaenidae
- Genus: Pilodeudorix
- Species: P. catalla

Binomial name
- Pilodeudorix catalla (Karsch, 1895)

Synonyms
- Deudorix (Diopetes) catalla Karsch, 1895

Species of butterfly

Pilodeudorix catalla is a butterfly in the family Lycaenidae. It is found from Ghana to Cameroon and in Equatorial Guinea and the Democratic Republic of the Congo (Uele).

Images Royal Museum Central Africa]
