= Pilodeudorix nyanzana =

Scientific classification
- Domain: Eukaryota
- Kingdom: Animalia
- Phylum: Arthropoda
- Class: Insecta
- Order: Lepidoptera
- Family: Lycaenidae
- Genus: Pilodeudorix
- Species: P. nyanzana

Binomial name
- Pilodeudorix nyanzana (Stempffer, 1957)

Synonyms
- Deudorix (Hypokopelates) nyanzana Stempffer, 1957

Species of butterfly

Pilodeudorix nyanzana is a butterfly in the family Lycaenidae. It is found in Uganda and north-western Tanzania. The habitat consists of primary forests.
