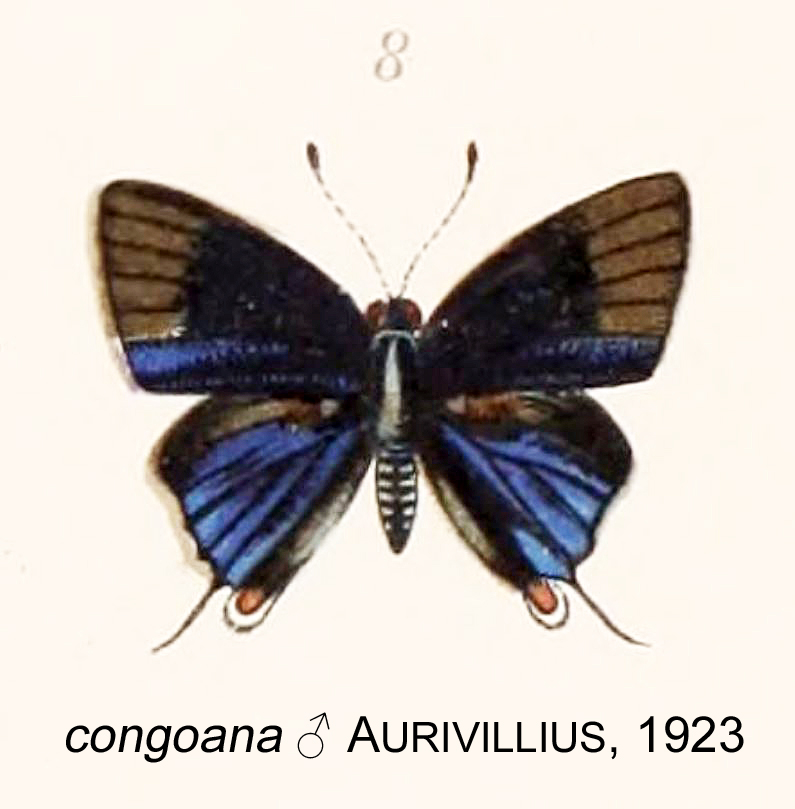

Scientific classification
- Domain: Eukaryota
- Kingdom: Animalia
- Phylum: Arthropoda
- Class: Insecta
- Order: Lepidoptera
- Family: Lycaenidae
- Genus: Pilodeudorix
- Species: P. congoana

Binomial name
- Pilodeudorix congoana (Aurivillius, 1923)

Synonyms
- Deudorix congoana Aurivillius, 1923; Deudorix diyllus congoana; Deudorix (Pilodeudorix) diyllus orientalis Stempffer, 1957

= Pilodeudorix congoana =

Species of butterfly

Pilodeudorix congoana, the eastern green-streaked playboy, is a butterfly in the family Lycaenidae. It is found in Nigeria, Cameroon, Gabon, the Republic of the Congo, the Central African Republic, the Democratic Republic of the Congo, Burundi, Uganda, Kenya, Tanzania and Zambia. The habitat consists of forests.

== Subspecies ==
- Pilodeudorix congoana congoana (Nigeria, Cameroon, Gabon, Congo, Central African Republic, Democratic Republic of the Congo, Burundi)
- Pilodeudorix congoana orientalis (Stempffer, 1957) (southern Democratic Republic of the Congo, Uganda, western Kenya, western Tanzania, northern Zambia)
