= Pilodeudorix angelita =

Scientific classification
- Kingdom: Animalia
- Phylum: Arthropoda
- Clade: Pancrustacea
- Class: Insecta
- Order: Lepidoptera
- Family: Lycaenidae
- Genus: Pilodeudorix
- Species: P. angelita

Binomial name
- Pilodeudorix angelita (Suffert, 1904)

Synonyms
- Deudorix angelita Suffert, 1904; Deudoryx makala Bethune-Baker, 1908; Deudorix schultzei Aurivillius, 1907

Species of butterfly

Pilodeudorix angelita, the Angelita's playboy, is a butterfly in the family Lycaenidae. It is found in Nigeria, Cameroon, Gabon, the Republic of the Congo, the Central African Republic and the Democratic Republic of the Congo. The habitat consists of primary forests.

== Subspecies ==
- Pilodeudorix angelita angelita (Cameroon, Gabon, Congo, Central African Republic, western and eastern Democratic Republic of the Congo)
- Pilodeudorix angelita schultzei (Aurivillius, 1907) (Nigeria: Cross River loop, Cameroon: west of the mountains)
