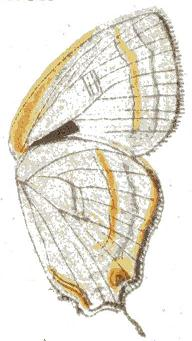
- Underside

Scientific classification
- Kingdom: Animalia
- Phylum: Arthropoda
- Clade: Pancrustacea
- Class: Insecta
- Order: Lepidoptera
- Family: Lycaenidae
- Genus: Pilodeudorix
- Species: P. kafuensis

Binomial name
- Pilodeudorix kafuensis (Neave, 1910)

Synonyms
- Deudorix kafuensis Neave, 1910; Deudorix feminina Hulstaert, 1924

= Pilodeudorix kafuensis =

Species of butterfly

Pilodeudorix kafuensis is a butterfly in the family Lycaenidae. It is found in Zambia (north of Lusaka), the Democratic Republic of the Congo (Lualaba and Shaba), Malawi and south-western Tanzania. The habitat consists of primary forests.
