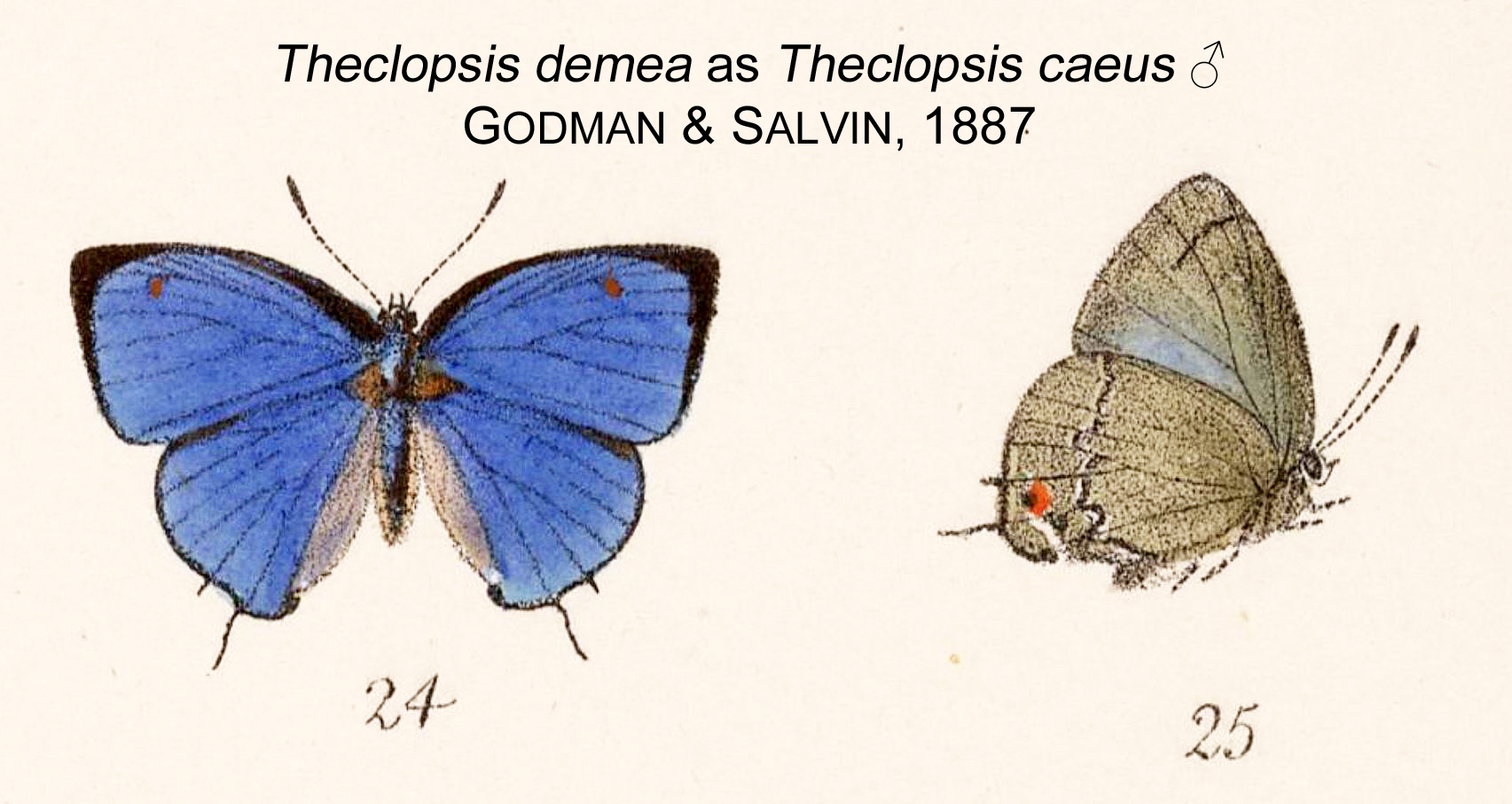

Scientific classification
- Kingdom: Animalia
- Phylum: Arthropoda
- Class: Insecta
- Order: Lepidoptera
- Family: Lycaenidae
- Genus: Theclopsis
- Species: T. demea

Binomial name
- Theclopsis demea (Hewitson, 1874)

= Theclopsis demea =

Species of butterfly

Theclopsis demea is a Neotropical butterfly in the family Lycaenidae. It is found in Nicaragua and Panama.
