= Pilodeudorix baginei =

Scientific classification
- Kingdom: Animalia
- Phylum: Arthropoda
- Class: Insecta
- Order: Lepidoptera
- Family: Lycaenidae
- Genus: Pilodeudorix
- Species: P. baginei

Binomial name
- Pilodeudorix baginei (Collins & Larsen, 1991)

Synonyms
- Deudorix (Actis) perigrapha baginei Collins & Larsen, 1991

Species of butterfly

Pilodeudorix baginei is a butterfly in the family Lycaenidae. It is found in Uganda, western Kenya and north-western Tanzania. The habitat consists of forests.
