= Pilodeudorix laticlavia =

Scientific classification
- Kingdom: Animalia
- Phylum: Arthropoda
- Clade: Pancrustacea
- Class: Insecta
- Order: Lepidoptera
- Family: Lycaenidae
- Genus: Pilodeudorix
- Species: P. laticlavia

Binomial name
- Pilodeudorix laticlavia (Clench, 1965)

Synonyms
- Deudorix (Diopetes) laticlavia Clench, 1965

Species of butterfly

Pilodeudorix laticlavia, the Clench's diopetes, is a butterfly in the family Lycaenidae. It is found in Ivory Coast, Ghana and Cameroon. The habitat consists of forests.
