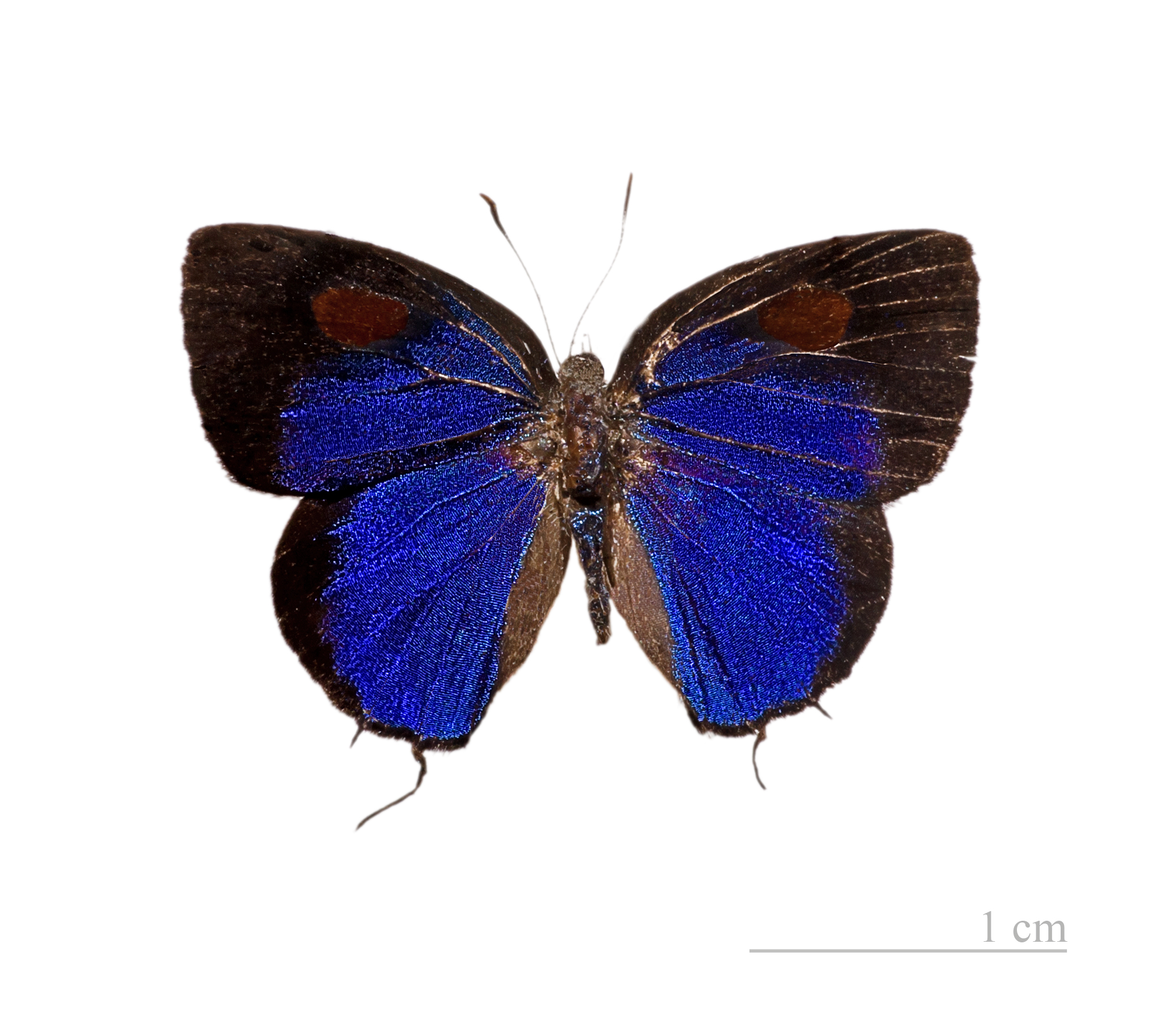
- Theclopsis lydus - MHNT

Scientific classification
- Domain: Eukaryota
- Kingdom: Animalia
- Phylum: Arthropoda
- Class: Insecta
- Order: Lepidoptera
- Family: Lycaenidae
- Tribe: Eumaeini
- Genus: Theclopsis; Godman & Salvin, [1887]

Synonyms
- Asymbiopsis K.Johnson & Le Crom, 1997

= Theclopsis =

Butterfly genus in family Lycaenidae

Theclopsis is a genus of butterflies in the family Lycaenidae. The species of this genus are found in the Neotropical realm.

== Species ==
- Theclopsis demea (Hewitson, 1874) Nicaragua, Panama
- Theclopsis lydus (Hübner, [1819]) Surinam, French Guiana, Venezuela, Ecuador, Peru, Bolivia, Brazil
- Theclopsis murex (Druce, 1907) Brazil(Rio Grande do Sul, Rio de Janeiro)
- Theclopsis leos (Schaus, 1913) Costa Rica
- Theclopsis epidius (Godman & Salvin, [1887]) Panama, Colombia
- Theclopsis gargara (Hewitson, 1868) Brazil (Pará), Colombia, Panama.
- Theclopsis mycon (Godman & Salvin, [1887]) Mexico, Guatemala, Panama, Colombia, Amazonas
- Theclopsis aurina Robbins, 2002 Colombia
