= Pilodeudorix hamidou =

Scientific classification
- Domain: Eukaryota
- Kingdom: Animalia
- Phylum: Arthropoda
- Class: Insecta
- Order: Lepidoptera
- Family: Lycaenidae
- Genus: Pilodeudorix
- Species: P. hamidou

Binomial name
- Pilodeudorix hamidou Libert, 2004

Species of butterfly

Pilodeudorix hamidou is a butterfly in the family Lycaenidae. It is found in Ivory Coast and western and southern Cameroon.
