= Pseudaletis bouyeri =

Scientific classification
- Kingdom: Animalia
- Phylum: Arthropoda
- Class: Insecta
- Order: Lepidoptera
- Family: Lycaenidae
- Genus: Pseudaletis
- Species: P. bouyeri

Binomial name
- Pseudaletis bouyeri Collins & Libert, 2007

Species of butterfly

Pseudaletis bouyeri is a butterfly in the family Lycaenidae. It is found in Cameroon.
