= Pseudaletis dolieri =

Scientific classification
- Domain: Eukaryota
- Kingdom: Animalia
- Phylum: Arthropoda
- Class: Insecta
- Order: Lepidoptera
- Family: Lycaenidae
- Genus: Pseudaletis
- Species: P. dolieri

Binomial name
- Pseudaletis dolieri Collins & Libert, 2007

Species of butterfly

Pseudaletis dolieri is a butterfly in the family Lycaenidae. It is found in Cameroon and the Central African Republic.
