= Pilodeudorix camerona =

Scientific classification
- Kingdom: Animalia
- Phylum: Arthropoda
- Clade: Pancrustacea
- Class: Insecta
- Order: Lepidoptera
- Family: Lycaenidae
- Genus: Pilodeudorix
- Species: P. camerona

Binomial name
- Pilodeudorix camerona (Plötz, 1880)

Synonyms
- Sithon camerona Plötz, 1880; Hypolycaena nobilis Staudinger, 1891; Pilodeudorix barbatus Druce, 1891; Deudorix (Pilodeudorix) katanga Clench, 1965

Species of butterfly

Pilodeudorix camerona, the tufted green-streaked playboy, is a butterfly in the family Lycaenidae. It is found in Guinea, Sierra Leone, Liberia, Ivory Coast, Ghana, Togo, Nigeria, Cameroon, Gabon, the Republic of the Congo, the Central African Republic, the Democratic Republic of the Congo, Uganda, Kenya, Tanzania, Malawi and Zambia. The habitat consists of savanna.

Adults feed on the flowers of Eupatorium species.

The larvae feed on Pterocarpus esculenta. They are attended to by ants of the genus Oecophylla.

== Subspecies ==
- Pilodeudorix camerona camerona (Guinea, Sierra Leone, Liberia, Ivory Coast, Ghana, Togo, Nigeria: south and the Cross River loop, Cameroon, Gabon, Congo, Central African Republic, western Democratic Republic of the Congo)
- Pilodeudorix camerona katanga (Clench, 1965) (eastern and southern Democratic Republic of the Congo, Uganda, western Kenya, north-western Tanzania, Malawi, northern Zambia)

Torben Larsen developed a species numbering system for his 2005 publication Butterflies of West Africa. The nominate subspecies is #457. The 'Larsen' numbers have since been used with permission in A Sharp Eye on Butterflies of Ghana.
