= Pseudaletis zebra =

Zebra fantasy

Scientific classification
- Domain: Eukaryota
- Kingdom: Animalia
- Phylum: Arthropoda
- Class: Insecta
- Order: Lepidoptera
- Family: Lycaenidae
- Genus: Pseudaletis
- Species: P. zebra

Binomial name
- Pseudaletis zebra Holland, 1891

Species of butterfly

Pseudaletis zebra, the zebra fantasy, is a butterfly in the family Lycaenidae. It is found in Sierra Leone, Liberia, Ivory Coast, Ghana, Nigeria, Cameroon, Gabon, the Central African Republic and the Democratic Republic of the Congo. The habitat consists of forests.

== Subspecies ==
- Pseudaletis zebra zebra (Nigeria: west and the Cross River loop, Cameroon, Gabon, Central African Republic, Democratic Republic of the Congo)
- Pseudaletis zebra subangulata Talbot, 1935 (Sierra Leone, Liberia, Ivory Coast, Ghana)
