= Pseudaletis camarensis =

Scientific classification
- Domain: Eukaryota
- Kingdom: Animalia
- Phylum: Arthropoda
- Class: Insecta
- Order: Lepidoptera
- Family: Lycaenidae
- Genus: Pseudaletis
- Species: P. camarensis

Binomial name
- Pseudaletis camarensis Collins & Libert, 2007

Species of butterfly

Pseudaletis camarensis is a butterfly in the family Lycaenidae. It is found in Cameroon, the Central African Republic and the Democratic Republic of the Congo.

== Subspecies ==
- Pseudaletis camarensis camarensis (Cameroon, Central African Republic)
- Pseudaletis camarensis depuncta Libert, 2007 (north-eastern Democratic Republic of the Congo)
