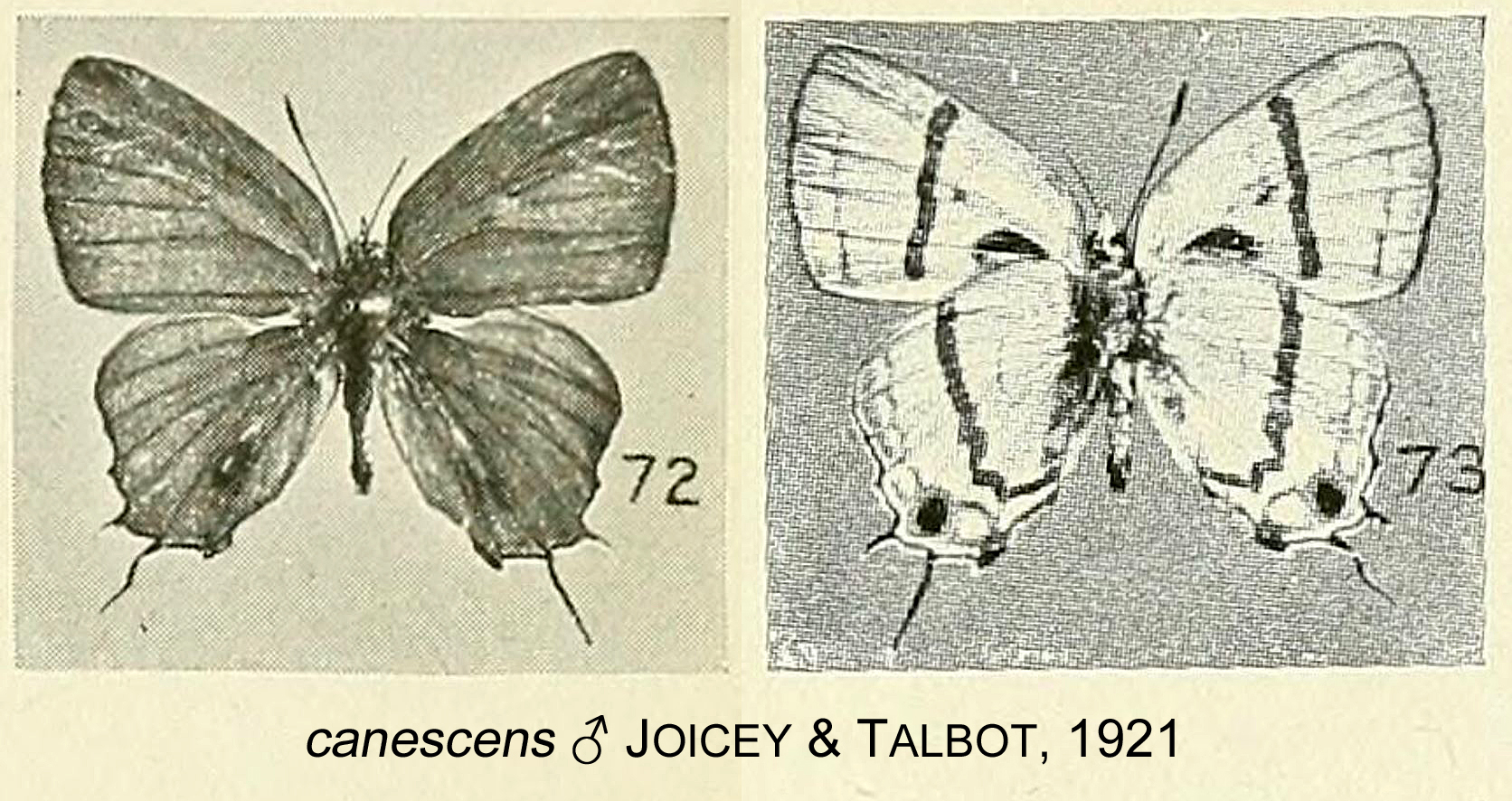

Scientific classification
- Domain: Eukaryota
- Kingdom: Animalia
- Phylum: Arthropoda
- Class: Insecta
- Order: Lepidoptera
- Family: Lycaenidae
- Genus: Pilodeudorix
- Species: P. canescens

Binomial name
- Pilodeudorix canescens (Joicey & Talbot, 1921)

Synonyms
- Hypokopelates canescens Joicey and Talbot, 1921; Deudorix fusca Aurivillius, 1923

= Pilodeudorix canescens =

Species of butterfly

Pilodeudorix canescens is a butterfly in the family Lycaenidae. It is found in the Democratic Republic of the Congo (Kinshasa, Lulua and Sankuru), western Uganda and north-western Tanzania. The habitat consists of primary forests.
