= Pilodeudorix anetia =

Scientific classification
- Domain: Eukaryota
- Kingdom: Animalia
- Phylum: Arthropoda
- Class: Insecta
- Order: Lepidoptera
- Family: Lycaenidae
- Genus: Pilodeudorix
- Species: P. anetia

Binomial name
- Pilodeudorix anetia (Hulstaert, 1924)

Synonyms
- Deudorix anetia Hulstaert, 1924

Species of butterfly

Pilodeudorix anetia, the Hulstaert's fairy playboy, is a butterfly in the family Lycaenidae. It is found in eastern Nigeria, Cameroon, the Republic of the Congo, the Democratic Republic of the Congo, Uganda, north-western Tanzania and Zambia. The habitat consists of primary forests.
