= Pilodeudorix rodgersi =

Scientific classification
- Kingdom: Animalia
- Phylum: Arthropoda
- Class: Insecta
- Order: Lepidoptera
- Family: Lycaenidae
- Genus: Pilodeudorix
- Species: P. rodgersi

Binomial name
- Pilodeudorix rodgersi Kielland, 1985

Species of butterfly

Pilodeudorix rodgersi is a butterfly in the family Lycaenidae. It is found in Tanzania, from the north-eastern part of the country to the Uluguru and Usambara mountains.
