= Pilodeudorix sadeska =

Scientific classification
- Kingdom: Animalia
- Phylum: Arthropoda
- Class: Insecta
- Order: Lepidoptera
- Family: Lycaenidae
- Genus: Pilodeudorix
- Species: P. sadeska

Binomial name
- Pilodeudorix sadeska (Clench, 1965)

Synonyms
- Deudorix (Diopetes) sadeska Clench, 1965

Species of butterfly

Pilodeudorix sadeska is a butterfly in the family Lycaenidae. It is found in Cameroon.
