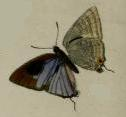

Scientific classification
- Domain: Eukaryota
- Kingdom: Animalia
- Phylum: Arthropoda
- Class: Insecta
- Order: Lepidoptera
- Family: Lycaenidae
- Genus: Pilodeudorix
- Species: P. obscurata

Binomial name
- Pilodeudorix obscurata (Trimen, 1891)

Synonyms
- Deudorix obscurata Trimen, 1891; Deudorix caerulea obscurata

= Pilodeudorix obscurata =

Species of butterfly

Pilodeudorix obscurata, the obscure blue-heart playboy, is a butterfly in the family Lycaenidae. It is found in Ethiopia, Kenya (east of the Rift Valley), Tanzania, Zambia (from Lusaka northwards), Mozambique, Zimbabwe and Namibia. The habitat consists of savanna.

Adults are attracted to flowers. They are on wing from August to September and again from November to May.
