= Pilodeudorix ducarmei =

Scientific classification
- Kingdom: Animalia
- Phylum: Arthropoda
- Class: Insecta
- Order: Lepidoptera
- Family: Lycaenidae
- Genus: Pilodeudorix
- Species: P. ducarmei

Binomial name
- Pilodeudorix ducarmei (Collins & Larsen, 1998)

Synonyms
- Diopetes ducarmei Collins & Larsen, 1998

Species of butterfly

Pilodeudorix ducarmei is a butterfly in the family Lycaenidae. It is found in the eastern part of the Democratic Republic of the Congo.
