= Pseudaletis ducarmei =

Scientific classification
- Kingdom: Animalia
- Phylum: Arthropoda
- Class: Insecta
- Order: Lepidoptera
- Family: Lycaenidae
- Genus: Pseudaletis
- Species: P. ducarmei

Binomial name
- Pseudaletis ducarmei Libert, 2007

Species of butterfly

Pseudaletis ducarmei is a butterfly in the family Lycaenidae. It is found in the Democratic Republic of the Congo.
