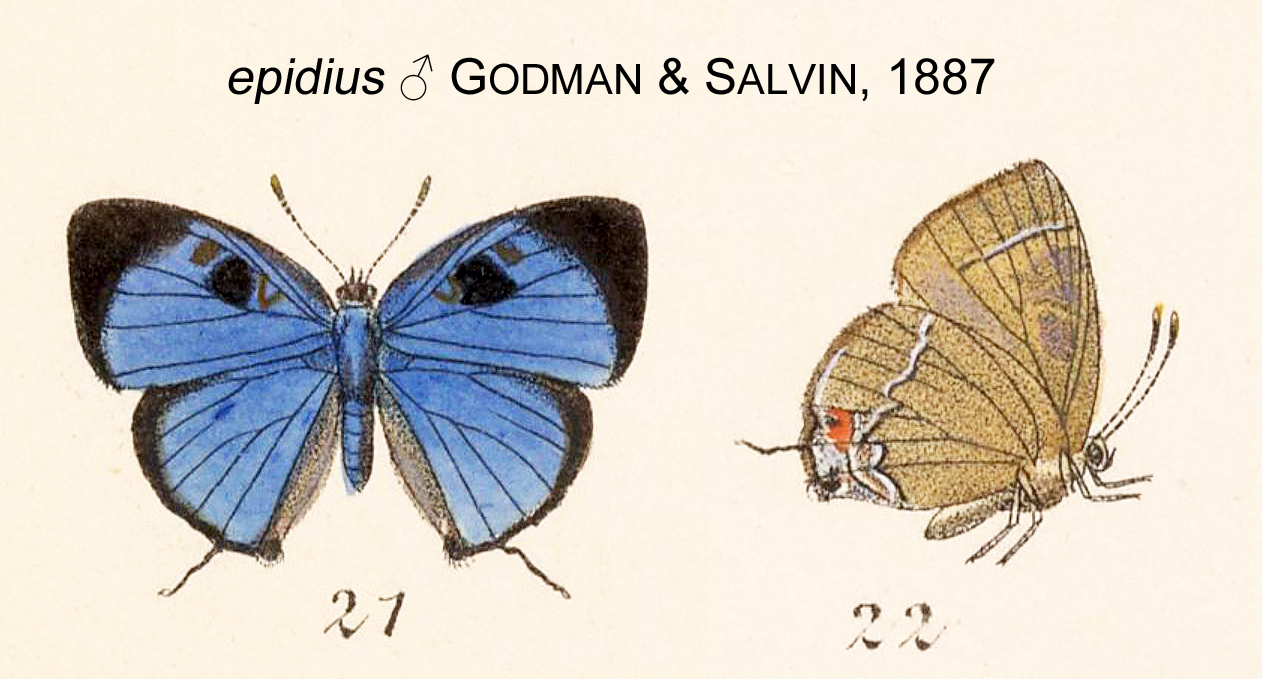

Scientific classification
- Domain: Eukaryota
- Kingdom: Animalia
- Phylum: Arthropoda
- Class: Insecta
- Order: Lepidoptera
- Family: Lycaenidae
- Genus: Theclopsis
- Species: T. epidius

Binomial name
- Theclopsis epidius (Godman & Salvin, [1887])

= Theclopsis epidius =

Species of butterfly

Theclopsis epidius is a Neotropical butterfly in the family Lycaenidae. It is found in Panama and Colombia.
