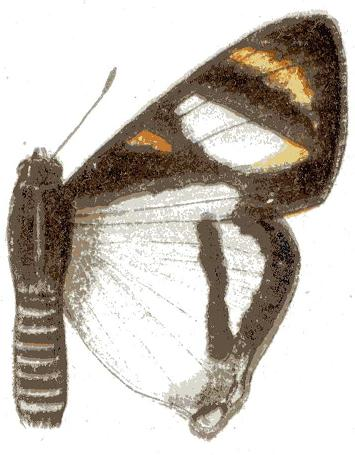

Scientific classification
- Kingdom: Animalia
- Phylum: Arthropoda
- Clade: Pancrustacea
- Class: Insecta
- Order: Lepidoptera
- Family: Lycaenidae
- Genus: Pseudaletis
- Species: P. leonis

Binomial name
- Pseudaletis leonis (Staudinger, 1888)

Synonyms
- Sithon leonis Staudinger, 1888; Pseudaletis trifasciata Sharpe, 1890

= Pseudaletis leonis =

West African fantasy

Species of butterfly

Pseudaletis leonis, the West African fantasy, is a butterfly in the family Lycaenidae. It is found in Senegal, Guinea, Sierra Leone, Ivory Coast, Ghana, Togo and western Nigeria. The habitat consists of forests.

Torben Larsen developed a species numbering system for his 2005 publication Butterflies of West Africa. This species is #391. The 'Larsen' numbers have since been used with permission in A Sharp Eye on Butterflies of Ghana.
