= Pilodeudorix fumata =

Scientific classification
- Domain: Eukaryota
- Kingdom: Animalia
- Phylum: Arthropoda
- Class: Insecta
- Order: Lepidoptera
- Family: Lycaenidae
- Genus: Pilodeudorix
- Species: P. fumata

Binomial name
- Pilodeudorix fumata (Stempffer, 1954)

Synonyms
- Deudorix (Diopetes) fumata Stempffer, 1954

Species of butterfly

Pilodeudorix fumata, the smoky diopetes, is a butterfly in the family Lycaenidae. It is found in Ghana, the north-eastern part of the Democratic Republic of the Congo and southern Uganda.
