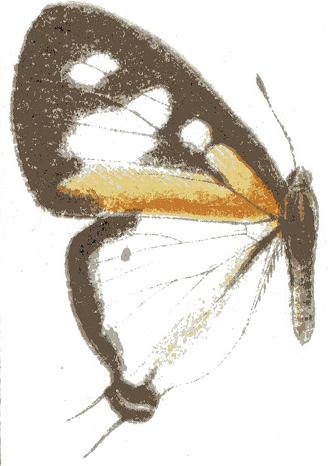

Scientific classification
- Domain: Eukaryota
- Kingdom: Animalia
- Phylum: Arthropoda
- Class: Insecta
- Order: Lepidoptera
- Family: Lycaenidae
- Genus: Pseudaletis
- Species: P. antimachus

Binomial name
- Pseudaletis antimachus (Staudinger, 1888)

Synonyms
- Sithon antimachus Staudinger, 1888; Pseudaletis nigra Holland, 1892; Pseudaletis spolia Riley, 1922; Pseudaletis dardanella Riley, 1922; Pseudaletis occidentalis Bethune-Baker, 1926; Pseudaletis angustimargo Hawker-Smith, 1926; Pseudaletis nigra fontainei Stempffer, 1961

= Pseudaletis antimachus =

Species of butterfly

Pseudaletis antimachus is a butterfly in the family Lycaenidae. It is found in Sierra Leone, Nigeria, Cameroon, Gabon, the Republic of the Congo, the Central African Republic, the Democratic Republic of the Congo, Uganda and Tanzania.
