= Pilodeudorix pseudoderitas =

Scientific classification
- Domain: Eukaryota
- Kingdom: Animalia
- Phylum: Arthropoda
- Class: Insecta
- Order: Lepidoptera
- Family: Lycaenidae
- Genus: Pilodeudorix
- Species: P. pseudoderitas

Binomial name
- Pilodeudorix pseudoderitas (Stempffer, 1964)

Synonyms
- Deudorix (Diopetes) pseudoderitas Stempffer, 1964

Species of butterfly

Pilodeudorix pseudoderitas, the sombre diopetes, is a butterfly in the family Lycaenidae. It is found in Ghana, eastern Nigeria, Cameroon, the Republic of the Congo, Angola, the Democratic Republic of the Congo and western Uganda. The habitat consists of forests.
