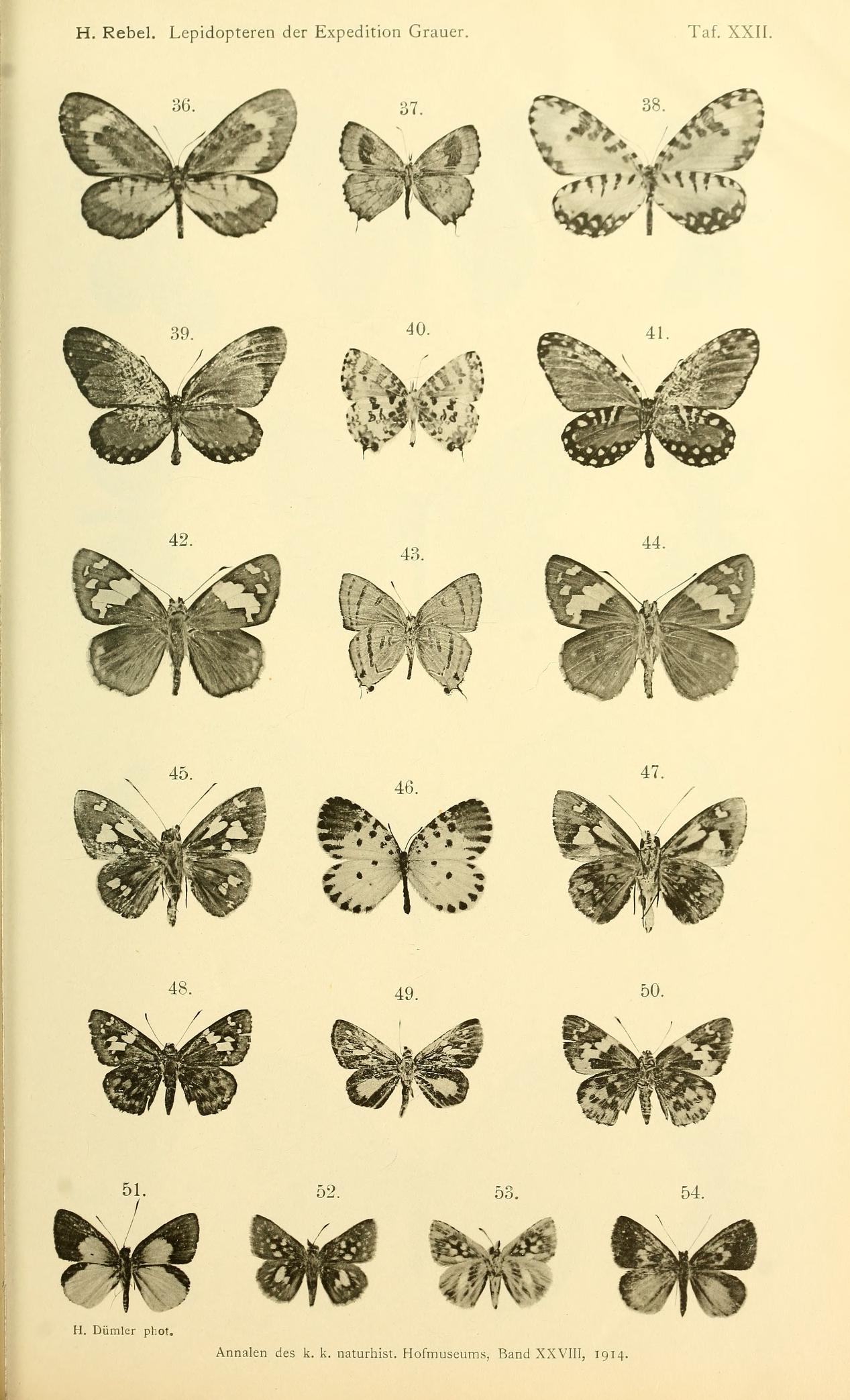
- Figure 43

Scientific classification
- Domain: Eukaryota
- Kingdom: Animalia
- Phylum: Arthropoda
- Class: Insecta
- Order: Lepidoptera
- Family: Lycaenidae
- Genus: Pilodeudorix
- Species: P. zelomina

Binomial name
- Pilodeudorix zelomina (Rebel, 1914)

Synonyms
- Deudorix zelomina Rebel, 1914

= Pilodeudorix zelomina =

Species of butterfly

Pilodeudorix zelomina is a butterfly in the family Lycaenidae. It is found in the Democratic Republic of the Congo (from the eastern part of the country to Kivu and the mountains northwest of Lake Tanganyika), southwestern Uganda, Zambia and possibly Rwanda and Burundi.
