= Pilodeudorix violetta =

Scientific classification
- Domain: Eukaryota
- Kingdom: Animalia
- Phylum: Arthropoda
- Class: Insecta
- Order: Lepidoptera
- Family: Lycaenidae
- Genus: Pilodeudorix
- Species: P. violetta

Binomial name
- Pilodeudorix violetta (Aurivillius, 1897)

Synonyms
- Deudorix violetta Aurivillius, 1897

Species of butterfly

Pilodeudorix violetta, the violet diopetes, is a butterfly in the family Lycaenidae. It is found in Guinea, Sierra Leone, Liberia, Ivory Coast, Ghana, southern Nigeria, Cameroon, Gabon, the Republic of the Congo, the Central African Republic, the Democratic Republic of the Congo (Uele), Uganda and north-western Tanzania.

Adults have been recorded feeding from the flowers of Eupatorium species.
