= Pilodeudorix azurea =

Scientific classification
- Kingdom: Animalia
- Phylum: Arthropoda
- Clade: Pancrustacea
- Class: Insecta
- Order: Lepidoptera
- Family: Lycaenidae
- Genus: Pilodeudorix
- Species: P. azurea

Binomial name
- Pilodeudorix azurea (Stempffer, 1964)

Synonyms
- Deudorix (Hypokopelates) azurea Stempffer, 1964

Species of butterfly

Pilodeudorix azurea is a butterfly in the family Lycaenidae. It is found in south-western Uganda and Etoumbi in the Republic of the Congo. The habitat consists of primary forests.
