= Pilodeudorix zeloides =

Scientific classification
- Kingdom: Animalia
- Phylum: Arthropoda
- Class: Insecta
- Order: Lepidoptera
- Family: Lycaenidae
- Genus: Pilodeudorix
- Species: P. zeloides

Binomial name
- Pilodeudorix zeloides (Butler, 1901)

Synonyms
- Virachola zeloides Butler, 1901

Species of butterfly

Pilodeudorix zeloides, the midnight-blue playboy, is a butterfly in the family Lycaenidae. It is found in Uganda, western Tanzania, Malawi, Zambia, Mozambique and eastern Zimbabwe.

Adults feed from flowers. They are on wing from August to May.

The larvae feed on Parinari curatellifolia.
