= Pilodeudorix catori =

Scientific classification
- Domain: Eukaryota
- Kingdom: Animalia
- Phylum: Arthropoda
- Class: Insecta
- Order: Lepidoptera
- Family: Lycaenidae
- Genus: Pilodeudorix
- Species: P. catori

Binomial name
- Pilodeudorix catori (Bethune-Baker, 1903)

Synonyms
- Deudorix catori Bethune-Baker, 1903; Deudorix anetia anetta Talbot, 1935

Species of butterfly

Pilodeudorix catori, the Cator's fairy playboy, is a butterfly in the family Lycaenidae. It is found in Senegal (Basse Casamance), Guinea, Sierra Leone, Ivory Coast, Ghana, Nigeria (south and the Cross River loop) and possibly western Cameroon. The habitat consists of dry forests and forest mosaics.
