= Pseudaletis malangi =

Malang's fantasy

Scientific classification
- Domain: Eukaryota
- Kingdom: Animalia
- Phylum: Arthropoda
- Class: Insecta
- Order: Lepidoptera
- Family: Lycaenidae
- Genus: Pseudaletis
- Species: P. malangi

Binomial name
- Pseudaletis malangi Collins & Larsen, 1995

Species of butterfly

Pseudaletis malangi, the Malang's fantasy, is a butterfly in the family Lycaenidae. It is found in Guinea. The habitat consists of dry, open forests.

Adults are on wing in September.
