= Pilodeudorix kiellandi =

Scientific classification
- Domain: Eukaryota
- Kingdom: Animalia
- Phylum: Arthropoda
- Class: Insecta
- Order: Lepidoptera
- Family: Lycaenidae
- Genus: Pilodeudorix
- Species: P. kiellandi

Binomial name
- Pilodeudorix kiellandi (Congdon & Collins, 1998)

Synonyms
- Diopetes kiellandi Congdon & Collins, 1998

Species of butterfly

Pilodeudorix kiellandi, the Kielland's diopetes, is a butterfly in the family Lycaenidae. It is found in Sierra Leone, Ivory Coast, Ghana, Cameroon, the Republic of the Congo, the north-eastern part of the Democratic Republic of the Congo and north-western Tanzania.
