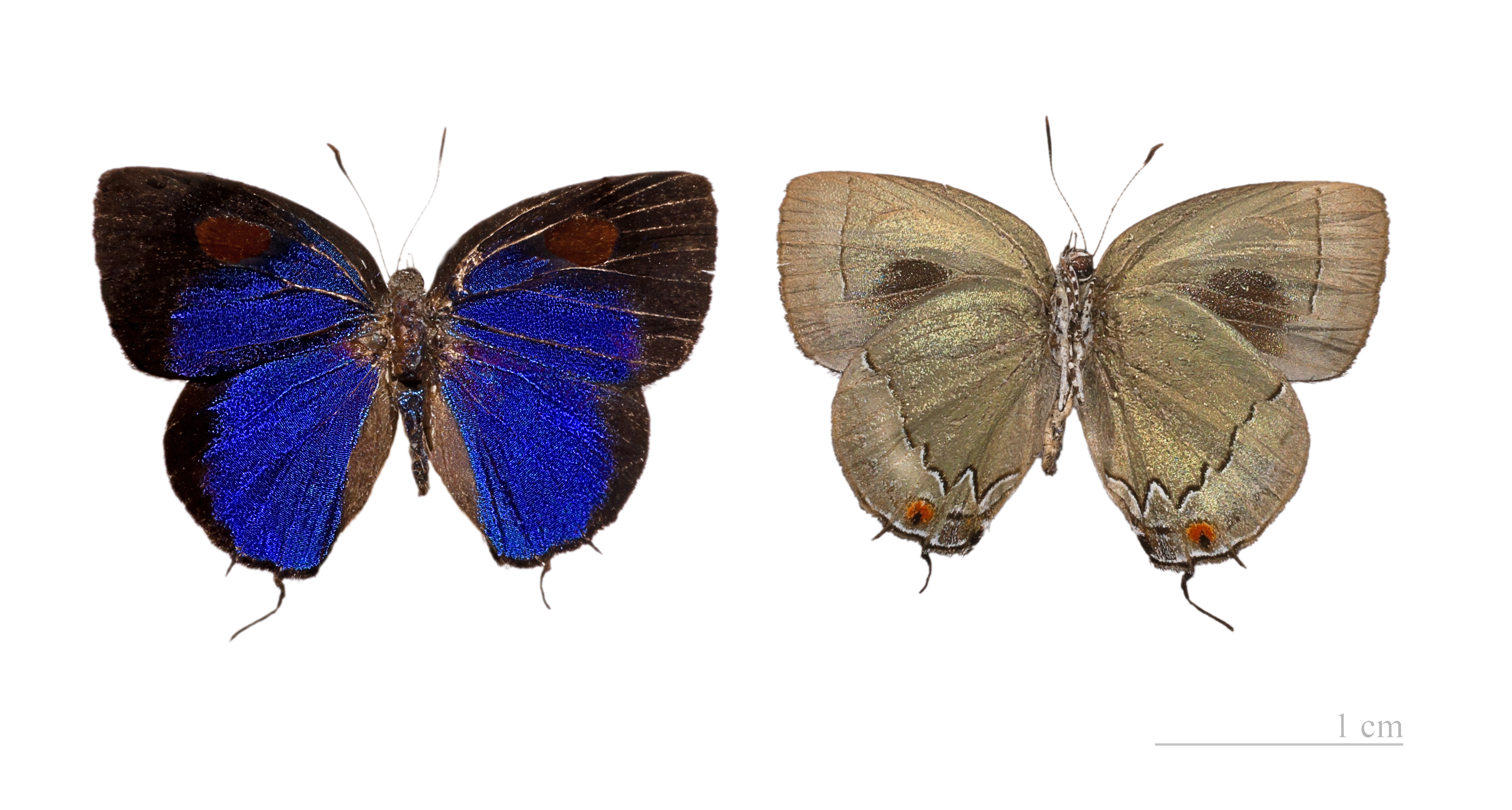
- Theclopsis lydus both sides

Scientific classification
- Domain: Eukaryota
- Kingdom: Animalia
- Phylum: Arthropoda
- Class: Insecta
- Order: Lepidoptera
- Family: Lycaenidae
- Genus: Theclopsis
- Species: T. lydus

Binomial name
- Theclopsis lydus (Hübner, [1819])

= Theclopsis lydus =

Species of butterfly

Theclopsis lydus is a Neotropical butterfly in the family Lycaenidae. It is found in Surinam, French Guiana, Venezuela, Ecuador, Peru, Bolivia and Brazil.
