= Pilodeudorix ankoleensis =

Scientific classification
- Domain: Eukaryota
- Kingdom: Animalia
- Phylum: Arthropoda
- Class: Insecta
- Order: Lepidoptera
- Family: Lycaenidae
- Genus: Pilodeudorix
- Species: P. ankoleensis

Binomial name
- Pilodeudorix ankoleensis (Stempffer, 1953)

Synonyms
- Deudorix (Pilodeudorix) ankoleensis Stempffer, 1953; Pilodeudorix camerona ugandae Stempffer, 1946

Species of butterfly

Pilodeudorix ankoleensis is a butterfly in the family Lycaenidae. It is found in western Uganda.
