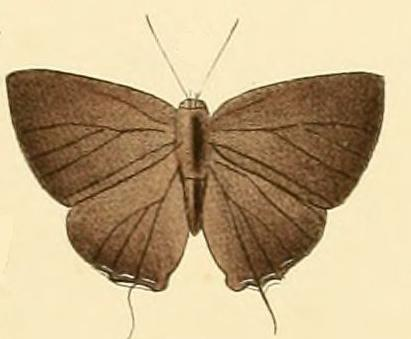

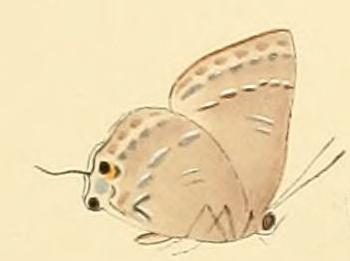

Scientific classification
- Kingdom: Animalia
- Phylum: Arthropoda
- Clade: Pancrustacea
- Class: Insecta
- Order: Lepidoptera
- Family: Lycaenidae
- Genus: Pilodeudorix
- Species: P. zela

Binomial name
- Pilodeudorix zela (Hewitson, 1869)

Synonyms
- Hypolycaena zela Hewitson, 1869; Hypolycaena simplex Staudinger, 1891

= Pilodeudorix zela =

Species of butterfly

Pilodeudorix zela, the blue-edged playboy, is a butterfly in the family Lycaenidae. It is found in Senegal (Basse Casamance), Guinea-Bissau, Guinea, Sierra Leone, Liberia, Ivory Coast, Ghana, Nigeria (south and the Cross River loop), Cameroon, the Republic of the Congo, the Central African Republic, the Democratic Republic of the Congo (Kinshasa, Lualaba and Tanganyika), Uganda, north-western Tanzania and northern Zambia. The habitat consists of forests, including dry forests.

Torben Larsen developed a species numbering system for his 2005 publication Butterflies of West Africa. This species is #461. The 'Larsen' numbers have since been used with permission in A Sharp Eye on Butterflies of Ghana.
