= Hamilton Herbert Druce =

English entomologist (1869–1922)

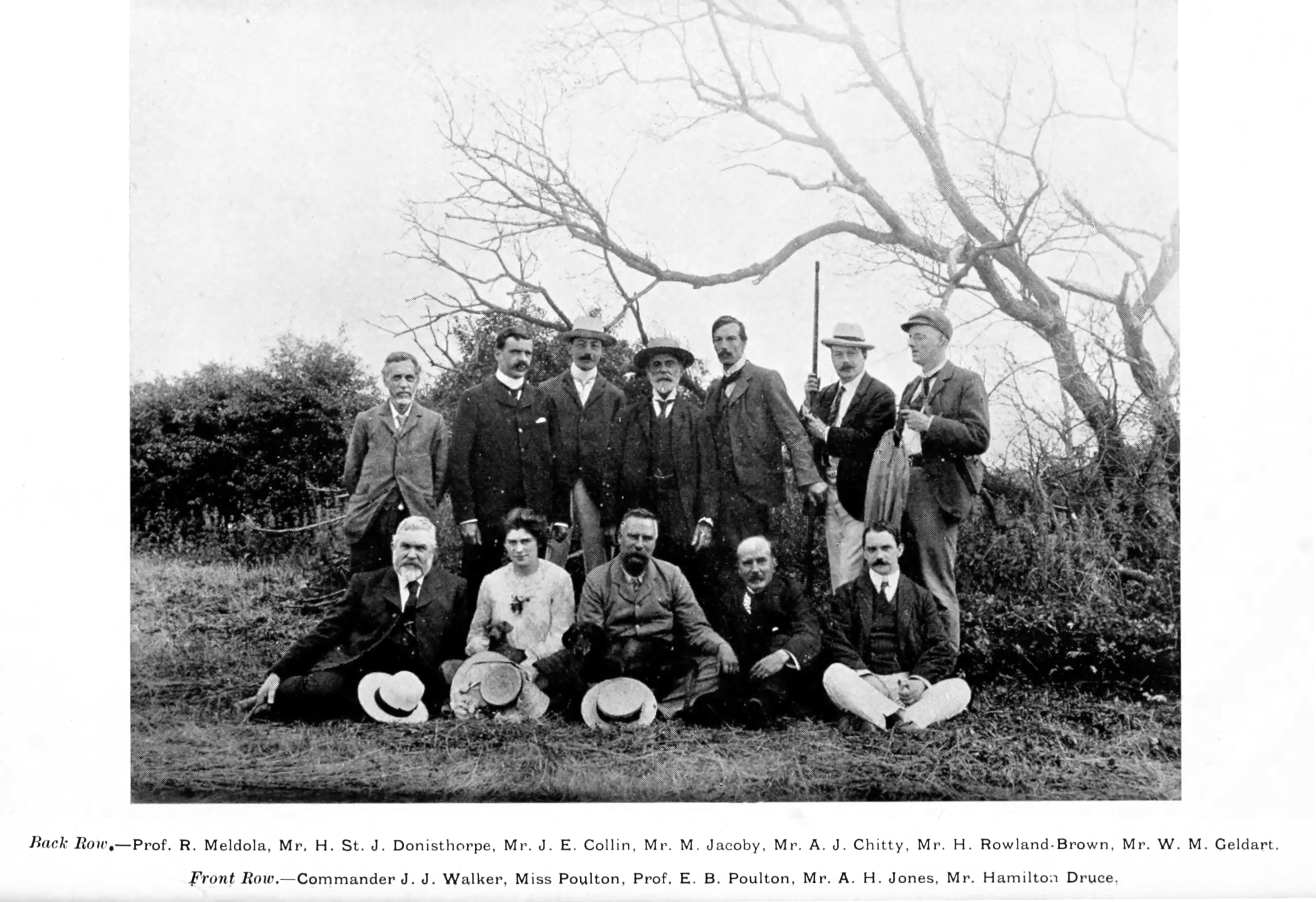
- Druce with the Entomological Society of London, 1904 (sitting, right)
- Born: Hamilton Herbert Charles James Druce; 26 October 1866; Ealing, Middlesex, England
- Died: 21 June 1922 (aged 55); London, England
- Scientific career
- Fields: Entomology

Hamilton Herbert Charles James Druce (26 October 1866 – 21 June 1922) was an English entomologist who specialised in Lycaenidae and to a lesser extent Hesperiidae. He is not to be confused with his father, the English entomologist Herbert Druce (1846–1913) who also worked on Lepidoptera.

H. H. Druce was a Fellow of the Zoological Society of London and of the Entomological Society of London.

The H. H. Druce collection was sold to James John Joicey and is now in the Natural History Museum in London.

== Selected works ==
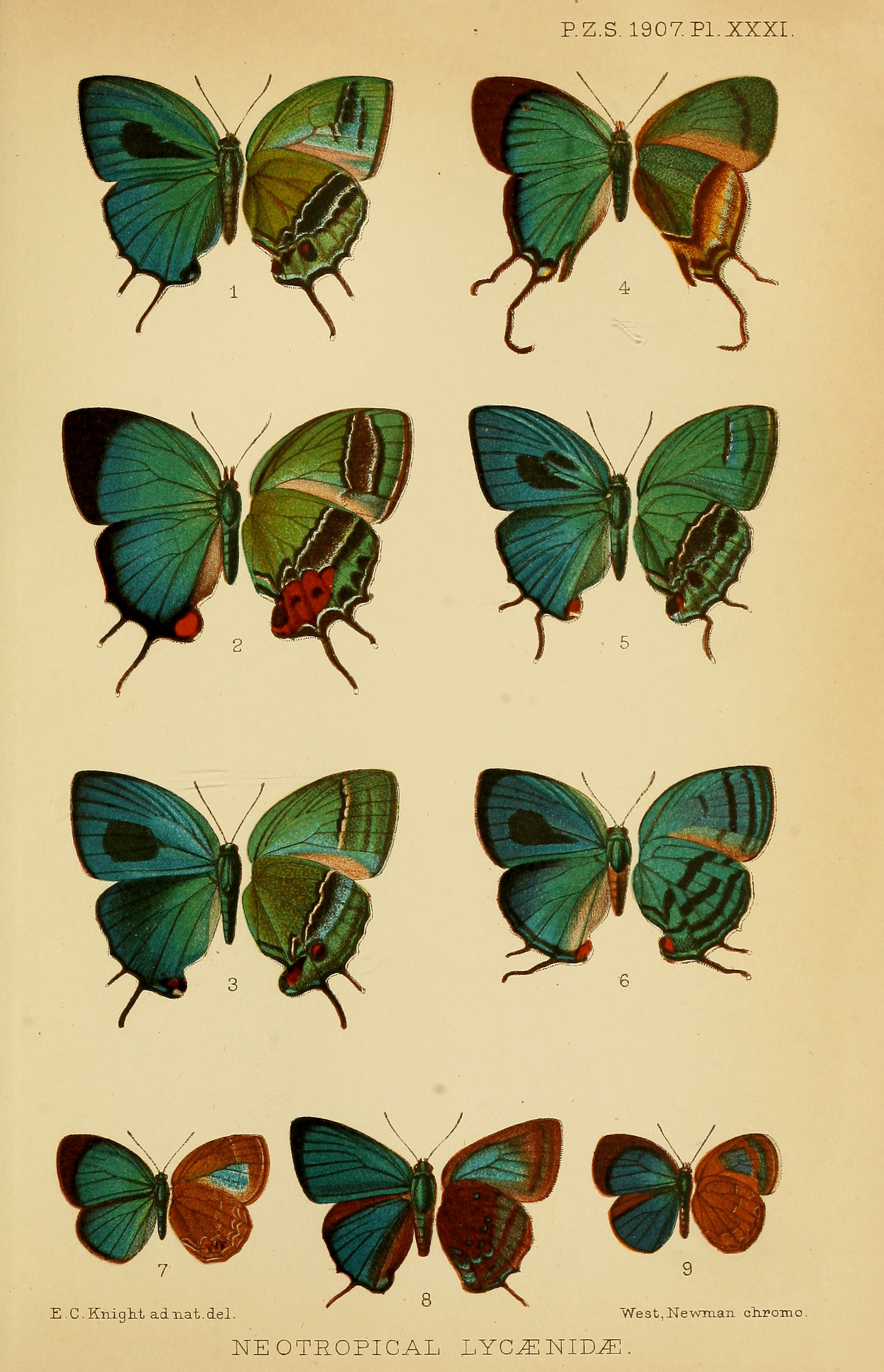
Plate 31 from Druce, H.H, 1907 On Neotropical Lycaenidae, with Descriptions of New Species Proceedings of the Zoological Society of London

- Druce, H. H., 1890 Descriptions of twelve new species of Lycaenidae from West Africa and one from the Solomon Islands in the collection of Herbert Druce. Annals and Magazine of Natural History (6)24–31.
- Druce, H. H., 1891. On the Lycaenidae of the Solomon Islands. Proc. zool. Soc. Lond. pp. 357–372, 2 pls.
- Druce, H. H., 1891 Descriptions of some new Genera and Species of West-African Lycaenidae Annals and Magazine of Natural History (6) 7 (40) : 364–367
- Druce, H. H., 1892. A list of the Lycaenidae of the South Pacific Islands east of the Solomon Group. Proc. zool. Soc. Lond. pp. 434–446, 1 pl.
- Druce, H. H., 1895. A monograph of the Bornean Lycaenidae, Proc. Zool. Soc. Lond. 1895: 556–267, 4 pls.
- Druce, H. H., 1897. Descriptions of four new species of Lycaenidae from the Eastern Archipelago. Ann. Mag. nat. Hist. (6)19: 14–16.
- Druce, H. H., 1902. On some new and little-known butterflies of the family Lycaenidae from the African, Australian and Oriental Regions. Proc. zool. Soc. Lond. (II)(1): 112–121, pls. 11,12.
- Druce, H. H., 1904. Descriptions of new species of Lycaenidae from Borneo and New Guinea. Ann. Mag. nat. Hist. (7)13: 140–142.
- Druce, H. H. and Bethune-Baker, G. T., 1893. A monograph of the butterflies of the genus Thysonotis. Proc. zool. Soc. Lond. 3 536–552, pls. 45–47.
- Druce, H.H. 1905. Descriptions of some new species of diurnal lepidoptera, collected by Mr. Harold Cookson, in Northern Rhodesia [actually in the Democratic Republic of Congo] in 1903 and 1904. Transactions of the Entomological Society of London 1905:251–262. Plate XIII
- Druce, H.H., 1909 On some new and little-known Hesperiidae from tropical west Africa. Proceedings of the Zoological Society of London 1909:406–413.
- Druce, H.H., 1910 Descriptions of new Lycaenidae and Hesperiidae from tropical West Africa. Proceedings of the Zoological Society of London 1910:356–378.
