= List of butterflies of Ghana =

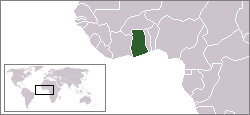
Location of Ghana

This is a partial list of butterflies of Ghana. About 900 species are known from Ghana, but only 23 are endemic.

== Nymphalidae ==
=== Apaturinae ===
- Apaturopsis cleochares

=== Biblidinae ===
- Ariadne albifascia
- Ariadne enotrea
- Byblia anvatara
- Byblia ilithyia
- Eurytela dryope
- Eurytela hiarbas
- Mesoxanthia ethosea
- Nepidopsis ophione
- Sevenia boisduvali
- Sevenia occidentalium
- Sevenia umbrina

=== Charaxinae ===
- Charaxes achaemenes
- Charaxes ameliae
- Charaxes anticlea
- Charaxes bipunctatus
- Charaxes bocqueti
- Charaxes boueti
- Charaxes brutus
- Charaxes candiope
- Charaxes castor
- Charaxes cedreatis
- Charaxes cynthia
- Charaxes doubledayi
- Charaxes epijasius
- Charaxes etesipe
- Charaxes etheocles
- Charaxes eudoxus
- Charaxes eupale
- Charaxes fournierae
- Charaxes fulvescens
- Charaxes hadrianus
- Charaxes hildebrandti
- Charaxes imperialis
- Charaxes lactetinctus
- Charaxes lucretius
- Charaxes lycurgus
- Charaxes mycerina
- Charaxes nichetes
- Charaxes nobilis
- Charaxes northcotti
- Charaxes numenes
- Charaxes paphianus
- Charaxes petersi
- Charaxes plantroui
- Charaxes pleione
- Charaxes pollux
- Charaxes porthos
- Charaxes protoclea
- Charaxes pythodoris
- Charaxes smaragdalis
- Charaxes subornatus
- Charaxes tiridates
- Charaxes varanes
- Charaxes viola
- Charaxes virilis
- Charaxes zelica
- Charaxes zingha
- Euxanthe eurinome
- Palla decius
- Palla publius
- Palla ussheri
- Palla violinitens

=== Cyrestinae ===
- Cyrestis camillus

=== Danainae ===
- Amauris damocles
- Amauris hecate
- Amauris niavius
- Amauris tartarea
- Danaus chrysippus
- Tirumala petiverana

=== Libytheinae ===
- Libythea labdaca

=== Limenitidinae ===
- Harma theobene
- Cymothoe fumana
- Cymothoe egesta
- Cymothoe lurida
- Cymothoe aubergeri
- Cymothoe herminia
- Cymothoe weymeri
- Cymothoe caenis
- Cymothoe althea
- Cymothoe jodutta
- Cymothoe coccinata
- Cymothoe mabillei
- Cymothoe sangaris
- Pseudoneptis bugandensis
- Pseudacraea eurytus
- Pseudacraea boisduvalii
- Pseudacraea lucretia
- Pseudacraea warburgi
- Pseudacraea hostilia
- Pseudacraea semire
- Neptis nemetes
- Neptis metella
- Neptis serena
- Neptis kiriakoffi
- Neptis morosa
- Neptis loma
- Neptis angusta
- Neptis alta
- Neptis seeldrayersi
- Neptis puella
- Neptis conspicua
- Neptis najo
- Neptis metanira
- Neptis continuata
- Neptis nysiades
- Neptis nicomedes
- Neptis quintilla
- Neptis paula
- Neptis strigata
- Neptis nicoteles
- Neptis nicobule
- Neptis mixophyes
- Neptis nebrodes
- Neptis trigonophora
- Neptis agouale
- Neptis melicerta
- Neptis troundi
- Catuna crithea
- Catuna niji
- Catuna oberthueri
- Catuna angustatum
- Euryphura togoensis
- Euryphura chalcis
- Hamanumida daedalus
- Aterica galene
- Cynandra opis
- Euriphene incerta
- Euriphene barombina
- Euriphene veronica
- Euriphene grosesmithi
- Euriphene simplex
- Euriphene amicia
- Euriphene aridatha
- Euriphene coerulea
- Euriphene ernestibaumanni
- Euriphene gambiae
- Euriphene ampedusa
- Euriphene leonis
- Euriphene atossa
- Euriphene doriclea
- Bebearia lucayensis
- Bebearia tentyris
- Bebearia osyris
- Bebearia carshena
- Bebearia absolon
- Bebearia zonara
- Bebearia mandinga
- Bebearia oxione
- Bebearia abesa
- Bebearia barce
- Bebearia mardania
- Bebearia cocalia
- Bebearia paludicola
- Bebearia sophus
- Bebearia arcadius
- Bebearia laetitia
- Bebearia phantasina
- Bebearia demetra
- Bebearia maledicta
- Bebearia ashantina
- Bebearia cutteri
- Medoniana medon
- Euphaedra gausape
- Euphaedra mariaechristinae
- Euphaedra xypete
- Euphaedra hebes
- Euphaedra diffusa
- Euphaedra crossei
- Euphaedra crockeri
- Euphaedra eusemoides
- Euphaedra cyparissa
- Euphaedra sarcoptera
- Euphaedra themis
- Euphaedra laboureana
- Euphaedra minuta
- Euphaedra modesta
- Euphaedra janetta
- Euphaedra splendens
- Euphaedra aberrans
- Euphaedra vetusta
- Euphaedra ceres
- Euphaedra phaethusa
- Euphaedra inanum
- Euphaedra ignota
- Euphaedra francina
- Euphaedra eleus
- Euphaedra zampa
- Euphaedra edwardsii
- Euphaedra ruspina
- Euphaedra perseis
- Euphaedra harpalyce
- Euphaedra eupalus
- Euptera crowleyi
- Euptera elabontas
- Euptera dorothea
- Euptera zowa
- Pseudathyma falcata
- Pseudathyma sibyllina

=== Heliconiinae ===
- Acraea abdera
- Acraea acerata
- Acraea alcinoe
- Acraea alciope
- Acraea aurivillii
- Acraea bonasia
- Acraea caecilia
- Acraea camaena
- Acraea circeis
- Acraea consanguinea
- Acraea egina
- Acraea encedana
- Acraea encedon
- Acraea endoscota
- Acraea epaea
- Acraea eugenia
- Acraea jodutta
- Acraea kraka
- Acraea leucographa
- Acraea lycoa
- Acraea macaria
- Acraea neobule
- Acraea orestia
- Acraea orina
- Acraea parrhasia
- Acraea peneleos
- Acraea perenna
- Acraea pharsalus
- Acraea polis
- Acraea pseudegina
- Acraea pseudepaea
- Acraea quirina
- Acraea rogersi
- Acraea serena
- Acraea translucida
- Acraea umbra
- Acraea vesperalis
- Acraea vestalis
- Acraea zetes
- Lachnoptera anticlia
- Phalanta eurytis
- Phalanta phalantha

=== Nymphalinae ===
- Antanartia delius
- Catacroptera cloanthe
- Hypolimnas anthedon
- Hypolimnas dinarcha
- Hypolimnas misippus
- Hypolimnas salmacis
- Junonia chorimene
- Junonia cymodoce
- Junonia hadrope
- Junonia hierta
- Junonia oenone
- Junonia orithya
- Junonia sophia
- Junonia stygia
- Junonia terea
- Junonia westermanni
- Kallimodes rumia
- Precis antilope
- Precis ceryne
- Precis octavia
- Precis pelarga
- Precis sinuata
- Protogoniomorpha anacardii
- Protogoniomorpha cytora
- Protogoniomorpha parhassus
- Salamis cacta
- Vanessa cardui
- Vanessula milca

=== Satyrinae ===
- Gnophodes betsimena
- Gnophodes chelys
- Melanitis leda
- Melanitis libya
- Elymniopsis bammakoo
- Bicyclus xeneas
- Bicyclus evadne
- Bicyclus ephorus
- Bicyclus italus
- Bicyclus zinebi
- Bicyclus uniformis
- Bicyclus procora
- Bicyclus pavonis
- Bicyclus milyas
- Bicyclus trilophus
- Bicyclus ignobilis
- Bicyclus maesseni
- Bicyclus larseni
- Bicyclus taenias
- Bicyclus vulgaris
- Bicyclus dorothea
- Bicyclus sandace
- Bicyclus sambulos
- Bicyclus sangmelinae
- Bicyclus mandanes
- Bicyclus auricruda
- Bicyclus campa
- Bicyclus angulosa
- Bicyclus sylvicolus
- Bicyclus abnormis
- Bicyclus safitza
- Bicyclus funebris
- Bicyclus dekeyseri
- Bicyclus istaris
- Bicyclus madetes
- Bicyclus martius
- Hallelesis halyma
- Henotesia elisi
- Heteropsis peitho
- Ypthima asterope
- Ypthima condamini
- Ypthima antennata
- Ypthima vuattouxi
- Ypthima doleta
- Ypthima pupillaris
- Ypthima impura
- Ypthimomorpha itonia

== Hesperiidae ==
=== Coeliadinae ===
- Coeliades bixana
- Coeliades chalybe
- Coeliades forestan
- Coeliades hanno
- Coeliades libeon
- Coeliades pisistratus
- Pyrrhiades lucagus
- Pyrrhochalcia iphis

=== Hesperiinae ===
- Acleros bala
- Acleros mackenii
- Acleros nigrapex
- Acleros ploetzi
- Andronymus caesar
- Andronymus evander
- Andronymus helles
- Andronymus hero
- Andronymus neander
- Artitropa comus
- Astictopterus abjecta
- Astictopterus anomoeus
- Borbo binga
- Borbo borbonica
- Borbo fallax
- Borbo fanta
- Borbo fatuellus
- Borbo gemella
- Borbo holtzi
- Borbo micans
- Borbo perobscura
- Caenides benga
- Caenides dacela
- Caenides dacena
- Caenides dacenilla
- Caenides hidarioides
- Caenides kangvensis
- Caenides otilia
- Caenides soritia
- Caenides xychus
- Ceratrichia argyrosticta
- Ceratrichia clara
- Ceratrichia crowleyi
- Ceratrichia maesseni
- Ceratrichia nothus
- Ceratrichia phocion
- Ceratrichia semilutea
- Fresna carlo
- Fresna cojo
- Fresna maesseni
- Fresna netopha
- Fresna nyassae
- Gamia buchholzi
- Gamia shelleyi
- Gegenes hottentota
- Gegenes niso
- Gegenes pumilio
- Gorgyra aburae
- Gorgyra afikpo
- Gorgyra aretina
- Gorgyra bina
- Gorgyra bule
- Gorgyra diversata
- Gorgyra heterochrus
- Gorgyra minima
- Gorgyra mocquerysii
- Gorgyra pali
- Gorgyra sara
- Gorgyra sola
- Gorgyra subfacatus
- Gretna balenge
- Gretna cylinda
- Gretna waga
- Gyrogra subnotata
- Hypoleucis ophiusa
- Hypoleucis sophia
- Hypoleucis tripunctata
- Kedestes protensa
- Leona binoevatus
- Leona halma
- Leona leonora
- Leona lota
- Leona luehderi
- Leona meloui
- Leona stoehri
- Melphina flavina
- Melphina malthina
- Melphina maximiliani
- Melphina noctula
- Melphina statira
- Melphina statirides
- Melphina tarace
- Melphina unistriga
- Meza cybeutes
- Meza elba
- Meza indusiata
- Meza leucophaea
- Meza mabea
- Meza mabillei
- Meza meza
- Monza alberti
- Monza cretacea
- Mopala orma
- Osmodes adon
- Osmodes adosus
- Osmodes banghaasi
- Osmodes costatus
- Osmodes distincta
- Osmodes laronia
- Osmodes lindseyi
- Osmodes lux
- Osmodes omar
- Osmodes thora
- Osphantes ogowena
- Paracleros biguttulus
- Paracleros maesseni
- Paracleros placidus
- Paracleros substrigata
- Pardaleodes edipus
- Pardaleodes incerta
- Pardaleodes sator
- Pardaleodes tibullus
- Pardaleodes xanthopeplus
- Parnara monasi
- Paronymus ligora
- Paronymus nevea
- Paronymus xanthias
- Parosmodes lentiginosa
- Parosmodes morantii
- Pelopidas mathias
- Pelopidas thrax
- Platylesches affinissima
- Platylesches batangae
- Platylesches chamaeleon
- Platylesches galesa
- Platylesches lamba
- Platylesches moritili
- Platylesches picanini
- Platylesches rossi
- Prosopalpus debilis
- Prosopalpus saga
- Prosopalpus styla
- Pteroteinon caenira
- Pteroteinon capronnieri
- Pteroteinon ceucaenira
- Pteroteinon concaenira
- Pteroteinon iricolor
- Pteroteinon laterculus
- Pteroteinon laufella
- Pteroteinon pruna
- Rhabdomantis galatia
- Rhabdomantis sosia
- Semalea arela
- Semalea atrio
- Semalea pulvina
- Semalea sextilis
- Teniorhinus ignita
- Teniorhinus watsoni
- Xanthodisca astrape
- Xanthodisca rega
- Zophopetes cerymica
- Zophopetes ganda
- Zophopetes quaternata

=== Pyrginae ===
- Abantis bismarcki
- Abantis elegantula
- Abantis ja
- Abantis leucogaster
- Abantis lucretia
- Abantis nigeriana
- Abantis pseudonigeriana
- Abantis tanobia
- Calleagris lacteus
- Caprona adelica
- Caprona pillaana
- Celaenorrhinus ankasa
- Celaenorrhinus cf galenus
- Celaenorrhinus galenus
- Celaenorrhinus leona
- Celaenorrhinus meditrina
- Celaenorrhinus ovalis
- Celaenorrhinus plagiatus
- Celaenorrhinus proxima
- Celaenorrhinus rutilans
- Celaenorrhinus sagamase
- Eagris decastigma
- Eagris denuba
- Eagris hereus
- Eagris subalbida
- Eagris tetrastigma
- Eagris tigris
- Eretis lugens
- Eretis melania
- Eretis plistonicus
- Gomalia elma
- Katreus johnstonii
- Loxolexis dimidia
- Loxolexis hollandi
- Loxolexis holocausta
- Netrobalane canopus
- Procampta rara
- Sarangesa bouvieri
- Sarangesa brigida
- Sarangesa laelius
- Sarangesa majorella
- Sarangesa phidyle
- Sarangesa tertullianus
- Sarangesa thecla
- Sarangesa tricerata
- Spialia diomus
- Spialia dromus
- Spialia ploetzi
- Spialia spio
- Tagiades flesus

== Lycaenidae ==
=== Poritiinae ===
- Aethiopana honorius
- Argyrocheila undifera
- Cephetola cephena
- Cephetola collinsi
- Cephetola maesseni
- Cephetola mercedes
- Cephetola obscura
- Cephetola pinodes
- Cephetola subcoerulea
- Cephetola sublustris
- Cerautola ceraunia
- Cerautola crowleyi
- Citrinophila erastus
- Citrinophila marginalis
- Citrinophila similis
- Epitola posthumus
- Epitola urania
- Epitola uranoides
- Epitolina catori
- Epitolina dispar
- Epitolina melissa
- Eresina maesseni
- Eresina pseudofusca
- Eresina saundersi
- Eresina theodori
- Eresiomera bicolor
- Eresiomera isca
- Eresiomera jacksoni
- Eresiomera petersi
- Falcuna campimus
- Falcuna leonensis
- Geritola gerina
- Geritola virginea
- Hewitsonia boisduvalii
- Hewitsonia inexpectata
- Hewitsonia occidentalis
- Hypophytala benitensis
- Hypophytala henleyi
- Hypophytala hyettina
- Hypophytala hyettoides
- Iridana exquisita
- Iridana ghanana
- Iridana hypocala
- Iridana incredibilis
- Iridana nigeriana
- Kakumia otlauga
- Larinopoda aspidos
- Larinopoda eurema
- Liptena albicans
- Liptena alluaudi
- Liptena catalina
- Liptena evanescens
- Liptena fatima
- Liptena ferrymani
- Liptena flavicans
- Liptena griveaudi
- Liptena helena
- Liptena pearmani
- Liptena rochei
- Liptena septistrigata
- Liptena seyboui
- Liptena similis
- Liptena simplicia
- Liptena submacula
- Liptena tiassale
- Liptena xanthostola
- Micropentila adelgitha
- Micropentila adelgunda
- Micropentila brunnea
- Micropentila dorothea
- Micropentila mamfe
- Mimacraea darwinia
- Mimacraea maesseni
- Mimacraea neurata
- Mimeresia cellularis
- Mimeresia debora
- Mimeresia issia
- Mimeresia libentina
- Mimeresia moyambina
- Mimeresia semirufa
- Naeveia lamborni
- Ornipholidotos irwini
- Ornipholidotos issia
- Ornipholidotos nigeriae
- Ornipholidotos nympha
- Ornipholidotos onitshae
- Ornipholidotos tiassale
- Pentila hewitsonii
- Pentila pauli
- Pentila petreia
- Pentila petreoides
- Pentila phidia
- Pentila picena
- Phytala elais
- Pseuderesia eleaza
- Ptelina carnuta
- Stempfferia cercene
- Stempfferia ciconia
- Stempfferia dorothea
- Stempfferia kholifa
- Stempfferia leonina
- Stempfferia michelae
- Stempfferia moyambina
- Stempfferia staudingeri
- Stempfferia zelza
- Telipna acraea
- Telipna maesseni
- Telipna semirufa
- Tetrarhanis baralingam
- Tetrarhanis stempfferi
- Tetrarhanis symplocus
- Torbenia wojtusiaki

=== Miletinae ===
- Aslauga ernesti
- Aslauga imitans
- Aslauga lamborni
- Aslauga marginalis
- Euliphyra hewitsoni
- Euliphyra leucyania
- Euliphyra mirifica
- Lachnocnema albimacula
- Lachnocnema disrupta
- Lachnocnema emperanus
- Lachnocnema luna
- Lachnocnema reutlingeri
- Lachnocnema vuattouxi
- Megalopalpus metaleucus
- Megalopalpus zymna
- Spalgis lemolea

=== Polyommatinae ===
- Actizera lucida
- Anthene amarah
- Anthene atewa
- Anthene crawshayi
- Anthene definita
- Anthene helpsi
- Anthene irumu
- Anthene juba
- Anthene kikuyu
- Anthene lachares
- Anthene larydas
- Anthene levis
- Anthene ligures
- Anthene liodes
- Anthene locuples
- Anthene lunulata
- Anthene lysicles
- Anthene princeps
- Anthene radiata
- Anthene rubricinctus
- Anthene scintillula
- Anthene starki
- Anthene sylvanus
- Anthene talboti
- Anthene wilsoni
- Azanus isis
- Azanus jesous
- Azanus mirza
- Azanus moriqua
- Azanus natalensis
- Azanus ubaldus
- Cacyreus audeoudi
- Cacyreus lingeus
- Chilades eleusis
- Cupidesthes jacksoni
- Cupidesthes leonina
- Cupidesthes lithas
- Cupidesthes mimetica
- Cupidesthes pungusei
- Cupidopsis cissus
- Cupidopsis jobates
- Eicochrysops dudgeoni
- Eicochrysops hippocrates
- Euchrysops albistriata
- Euchrysops barkeri
- Euchrysops malathana
- Euchrysops osiris
- Euchrysops reducta
- Euchrysops sahelianus
- Freyeria trochylus
- Lampides boeticus
- Lepidochrysops parsimon
- Lepidochrysops quassi
- Lepidochrysops synchrematiza
- Lepidochrysops victoriae
- Leptotes babaulti
- Leptotes brevidentatus
- Leptotes jeanneli
- Leptotes pirithous
- Leptotes pulchra
- Lyzanius lyzanius
- Neurellipes chryseostictus
- Neurellipes fulvus
- Neurellipes gemmifera
- Neurellipes lusones
- Neurellipes staudingeri
- Oboronia guessfeldti
- Oboronia liberiana
- Oboronia ornata
- Oboronia pseudopunctatus
- Oboronia punctatus
- Phlyaria cyara
- Pseudonacaduba sichela
- Tarucus rosacea
- Tarucus ungemachi
- Thermoniphas micylus
- Triclema fasciatus
- Triclema hades
- Triclema inconspicua
- Triclema lamias
- Triclema lucretilis
- Triclema nigeriae
- Triclema obscura
- Triclema phoenicis
- Triclema rufoplagata
- Tuxentius carana
- Tuxentius cretosus
- Uranothauma falkensteini
- Zizeeria knysna
- Zizina antanossa
- Zizula hylax

=== Theclinae ===
- Capys vorgasi
- Dapidodigma demeter
- Dapidodigma hymen
- Deudorix antalus
- Deudorix caliginosa
- Deudorix dinochares
- Deudorix dinomenes
- Deudorix galathea
- Deudorix kayonza
- Deudorix livia
- Deudorix lorisona
- Deudorix odana
- Etesiolaus catori
- Etesiolaus kyabobo
- Hypolycaena antifaunus
- Hypolycaena clenchi
- Hypolycaena dubia
- Hypolycaena hatita
- Hypolycaena kadiskos
- Hypolycaena kakumi
- Hypolycaena lebona
- Hypolycaena liara
- Hypolycaena nigra
- Hypolycaena philippus
- Hypolycaena scintillans
- Hypomyrina mimetica
- Hypomyrina nomion
- Iolaus aethria
- Iolaus alcibiades
- Iolaus alienus
- Iolaus banco
- Iolaus bellina
- Iolaus calisto
- Iolaus carolinae
- Iolaus eurisus
- Iolaus farquharsoni
- Iolaus fontainei
- Iolaus iasis
- Iolaus ismenias
- Iolaus iulus
- Iolaus laon
- Iolaus laonides
- Iolaus likpe
- Iolaus lukabas
- Iolaus maesa
- Iolaus mane
- Iolaus menas
- Iolaus paneperata
- Iolaus parasilanus
- Iolaus sappirus
- Iolaus scintillans
- Iolaus theodori
- Iolaus timon
- Myrina silenus
- Myrina subornata
- Oxylides faunus
- Paradeudorix eleala
- Paradeudorix moyambina
- Pilodeudorix aucta
- Pilodeudorix aurivilliusi
- Pilodeudorix caerulea
- Pilodeudorix camerona
- Pilodeudorix catori
- Pilodeudorix corruscans
- Pilodeudorix deritas
- Pilodeudorix diyllus
- Pilodeudorix fumata
- Pilodeudorix kiellandi
- Pilodeudorix laticlavia
- Pilodeudorix leonina
- Pilodeudorix otraeda
- Pilodeudorix pseudoderitas
- Pilodeudorix violetta
- Pilodeudorix virgata
- Pilodeudorix zela
- Stugeta marmoreus
- Zeritis neriene

=== Aphnaeinae ===
- Aphnaeus argyrocyclus
- Aphnaeus asterius
- Aphnaeus brahami
- Aphnaeus charboneli
- Aphnaeus gilloni
- Aphnaeus jefferyi
- Aphnaeus orcas
- Axiocerses amanga
- Axiocerses harpax
- Cigaritis avriko
- Cigaritis crustaria
- Cigaritis iza
- Cigaritis menelas
- Cigaritis mozambica
- Cigaritis nilus
- Lipaphnaeus aderna
- Lipaphnaeus leonina
- Pseudaletis agrippina
- Pseudaletis dardanella
- Pseudaletis leonis
- Pseudaletis subangulata

== Pieridae ==
=== Coliadinae ===
- Catopsilia florella
- Eurema brigitta
- Eurema desjardinsii
- Eurema floricola
- Eurema hapale
- Eurema hecabe
- Eurema senegalensis

=== Pierinae ===
- Appias epaphia
- Appias phaola
- Appias sabina
- Appias sylvia
- Belenois aurota
- Belenois calypso
- Belenois creona
- Belenois gidica
- Belenois hedyle
- Belenois subeida
- Belenois theora
- Colotis antevippe
- Colotis aurora
- Colotis celimene
- Colotis danae
- Colotis euippe
- Colotis evagore
- Colotis ione
- Colotis vesta
- Dixeia capricornus
- Dixeia cebron
- Dixeia doxo
- Dixeia orbona
- Leptosia alcesta
- Leptosia hybrida
- Leptosia marginea
- Leptosia medusa
- Leptosia wigginsi
- Mylothris aburi
- Mylothris atewa
- Mylothris chloris
- Mylothris dimidiata
- Mylothris jaopura
- Mylothris poppea
- Mylothris rhodope
- Mylothris schumanni
- Mylothris spica
- Nepheronia argia
- Nepheronia pharis
- Nepheronia thalassina
- Pinacopteryx eriphia

=== Pseudopontiinae ===
- Pseudopontia paradoxa

== Riodinidae ==
- Abisara gerontes
- Abisara intermedia
- Abisara tantalus

== Papilionidae ==
=== Papilioninae ===
- Graphium adamastor
- Graphium agamedes
- Graphium almansor
- Graphium angolanus
- Graphium antheus
- Graphium illyris
- Graphium latreillianus
- Graphium leonidas
- Graphium liponesco
- Graphium policenes
- Graphium rileyi
- Graphium tynderaeus
- Papilio antimachus
- Papilio chrapkowskoides
- Papilio cynorta
- Papilio cyproeofila
- Papilio dardanus
- Papilio demodocus
- Papilio horribilis
- Papilio menestheus
- Papilio nireus
- Papilio nobicea
- Papilio phorcas
- Papilio sosia
- Papilio zalmoxis
- Papilio zenobia

== See also ==
- Ghana in List of terrestrial ecoregions (WWF)
- Geography of Ghana
