= List of butterflies of Togo =

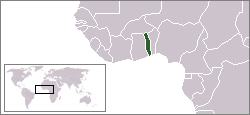
Location of Togo

This is a list of butterflies of Togo. About 414 species are known from Togo, none of which are endemic.

== Papilionidae ==
=== Papilioninae ===
==== Papilionini ====
- Giant African swallowtail, Papilio antimachus Drury, 1782
- Giant blue swallowtail, Papilio zalmoxis Hewitson, 1864
- Narrow-banded green swallowtail, Papilio nireus Linnaeus, 1758
- Papilio chrapkowskoides nurettini Koçak, 1983
- Medium green-banded swallowtail, Papilio sosia Rothschild & Jordan, 1903
- Mimetic swallowtail, Papilio cynorta Fabricius, 1793
- Mocker swallowtail, Papilio dardanus Brown, 1776
- Apple-green swallowtail, Papilio phorcas Cramer, 1775
- Common white-banded swallowtail, Papilio cyproeofila Butler, 1868
- Volta swallowtail, Papilio nobicea Suffert, 1904
- Citrus swallowtail, Papilio demodocus Esper, [1798]
- Western emperor swallowtail, Papilio menestheus Drury, 1773

==== Leptocercini ====
- Large striped swordtail, Graphium antheus (Cramer, 1779)
- Graphium policenes (Cramer, 1775)
- Graphium liponesco (Suffert, 1904)
- Graphium angolanus baronis (Ungemach, 1932)
- Graphium leonidas (Fabricius, 1793)
- Graphium adamastor (Boisduval, 1836)
- Graphium agamedes (Westwood, 1842)
- Graphium almansor carchedonius (Karsch, 1895)

== Pieridae ==
=== Coliadinae ===
- Eurema brigitta (Stoll, [1780])
- Eurema desjardinsii marshalli (Butler, 1898)
- Eurema regularis (Butler, 1876)
- Eurema hecabe solifera (Butler, 1875)
- Eurema senegalensis (Boisduval, 1836)
- Catopsilia florella (Fabricius, 1775)

=== Pierinae ===
- Colotis euippe (Linnaeus, 1758)
- Colotis evagore antigone (Boisduval, 1836)
- Nepheronia argia (Fabricius, 1775)
- Nepheronia pharis (Boisduval, 1836)
- Nepheronia thalassina (Boisduval, 1836)
- Leptosia alcesta (Stoll, [1782])
- Leptosia hybrida Bernardi, 1952
- Leptosia marginea (Mabille, 1890)
- Leptosia medusa (Cramer, 1777)
- Leptosia wigginsi pseudalcesta Bernardi, 1965

==== Pierini ====
- Appias epaphia (Cramer, [1779])
- Appias phaola (Doubleday, 1847)
- Appias sabina (Felder & Felder, [1865])
- Appias sylvia (Fabricius, 1775)
- Mylothris aburi Larsen & Collins, 2003
- Mylothris chloris (Fabricius, 1775)
- Mylothris jaopura Karsch, 1893
- Mylothris poppea (Cramer, 1777)
- Mylothris rhodope (Fabricius, 1775)
- Mylothris schumanni Suffert, 1904
- Belenois aurota (Fabricius, 1793)
- Belenois calypso (Drury, 1773)
- Belenois creona (Cramer, [1776])
- Belenois hedyle (Cramer, 1777)
- Belenois theora (Doubleday, 1846)

== Lycaenidae ==
=== Miletinae ===
==== Liphyrini ====
- Euliphyra leucyania (Hewitson, 1874)
- Aslauga ernesti (Karsch, 1895)
- Aslauga marginalis Kirby, 1890

==== Miletini ====
- Megalopalpus metaleucus Karsch, 1893
- Megalopalpus zymna (Westwood, 1851)
- Spalgis lemolea lemolea Druce, 1890
- Spalgis lemolea pilos Druce, 1890
- Lachnocnema emperamus (Snellen, 1872)
- Lachnocnema vuattouxi Libert, 1996

=== Poritiinae ===
==== Liptenini ====
- Ptelina carnuta (Hewitson, 1873)
- Pentila pauli Staudinger, 1888
- Pentila petreia Hewitson, 1874
- Pentila phidia Hewitson, 1874
- Telipna acraea (Westwood, [1851])
- Telipna semirufa (Grose-Smith & Kirby, 1889)
- Mimacraea maesseni Libert, 2000
- Mimacraea neurata Holland, 1895
- Mimeresia libentina (Hewitson, 1866)
- Liptena alluaudi Mabille, 1890
- Liptena pearmani Stempffer, Bennett & May, 1974
- Liptena rochei Stempffer, 1951
- Liptena septistrigata (Bethune-Baker, 1903)
- Tetrarhanis symplocus Clench, 1965
- Larinopoda aspidos Druce, 1890
- Eresiomera bicolor (Grose-Smith & Kirby, 1890)
- Citrinophila erastus (Hewitson, 1866)
- Citrinophila marginalis Kirby, 1887

==== Epitolini ====
- Epitola posthumus (Fabricius, 1793)
- Epitola urania Kirby, 1887
- Epitola uranioides occidentalis Libert, 1999
- Cerautola ceraunia (Hewitson, 1873)
- Cerautola crowleyi (Sharpe, 1890)
- Cerautola miranda (Staudinger, 1889)
- Geritola gerina (Hewitson, 1878)
- Stempfferia dorothea (Bethune-Baker, 1904)
- Stempfferia kholifa (Bethune-Baker, 1904)
- Stempfferia leonina (Staudinger, 1888)
- Stempfferia zelza (Hewitson, 1873)
- Cephetola cephena (Hewitson, 1873)
- Cephetola collinsi Libert & Larsen, 1999
- Cephetola sublustris (Bethune-Baker, 1904)
- Epitolina dispar (Kirby, 1887)
- Epitolina melissa (Druce, 1888)
- Epitolina catori Bethune-Baker, 1904
- Hypophytala benitensis (Holland, 1890)
- Hypophytala hyettoides (Aurivillius, 1895)
- Hypophytala ultramarina Libert & Collins, 1999
- Aethiopana honorius (Butler, 1901)
- Hewitsonia inexpectata (Bouyer, 1997)

=== Aphnaeinae ===
- Pseudaletis agrippina Druce, 1888
- Pseudaletis catori Bethune-Baker, 1926
- Pseudaletis leonis (Staudinger, 1888)
- Lipaphnaeus leonina ivoirensis Stempffer, 1966
- Cigaritis avriko (Karsch, 1893)
- Cigaritis mozambica (Bertoloni, 1850)
- Axiocerses harpax (Fabricius, 1775)
- Axiocerses amanga borealis Aurivillius, 1905

=== Theclinae ===
- Myrina silenus (Fabricius, 1775)
- Oxylides faunus (Drury, 1773)
- Dapidodigma hymen (Fabricius, 1775)
- Hypolycaena antifaunus (Westwood, 1851)
- Hypolycaena dubia Aurivillius, 1895
- Hypolycaena hatita Hewitson, 1865
- Hypolycaena kakumi Larsen, 1997
- Hypolycaena lebona (Hewitson, 1865)
- Hypolycaena liara Druce, 1890
- Hypolycaena philippus (Fabricius, 1793)
- Iolaus eurisus (Cramer, 1779)
- Iolaus aethria Karsch, 1893
- Iolaus bellina (Plötz, 1880)
- Iolaus iasis Hewitson, 1865
- Iolaus laon Hewitson, 1878
- Iolaus maesa (Hewitson, 1862)
- Iolaus iulus Hewitson, 1869
- Iolaus ismenias (Klug, 1834)
- Iolaus alcibiades Kirby, 1871
- Iolaus paneperata Druce, 1890
- Iolaus theodori Stempffer, 1970
- Iolaus calisto (Westwood, 1851)
- Iolaus timon (Fabricius, 1787)
- Pilodeudorix camerona (Plötz, 1880)
- Pilodeudorix diyllus (Hewitson, 1878)
- Pilodeudorix aucta (Karsch, 1895)
- Pilodeudorix aurivilliusi (Stempffer, 1954)
- Pilodeudorix catalla (Karsch, 1895)
- Paradeudorix eleala viridis (Stempffer, 1964)
- Paradeudorix moyambina (Bethune-Baker, 1904)
- Hypomyrina mimetica Libert, 2004
- Deudorix antalus (Hopffer, 1855)
- Deudorix lorisona (Hewitson, 1862)

=== Polyommatinae ===
==== Lycaenesthini ====
- Anthene amarah (Guérin-Méneville, 1849)
- Anthene crawshayi (Butler, 1899)
- Anthene irumu (Stempffer, 1948)
- Anthene ligures (Hewitson, 1874)
- Anthene liodes (Hewitson, 1874)
- Anthene lunulata (Trimen, 1894)
- Anthene lysicles (Hewitson, 1874)
- Anthene rubricinctus (Holland, 1891)
- Anthene starki Larsen, 2005
- Anthene sylvanus (Drury, 1773)
- Anthene chryseostictus (Bethune-Baker, 1910)
- Anthene hades (Bethune-Baker, 1910)
- Anthene lamias (Hewitson, 1878)
- Anthene lucretilis (Hewitson, 1874)
- Anthene nigeriae (Aurivillius, 1905)
- Anthene phoenicis (Karsch, 1893)
- Anthene rufoplagata (Bethune-Baker, 1910)
- Cupidesthes leonina (Bethune-Baker, 1903)

==== Polyommatini ====
- Cupidopsis cissus (Godart, [1824])
- Cupidopsis jobates mauritanica Riley, 1932
- Pseudonacaduba sichela (Wallengren, 1857)
- Lampides boeticus (Linnaeus, 1767)
- Uranothauma falkensteini (Dewitz, 1879)
- Phlyaria cyara stactalla Karsch, 1895
- Cacyreus lingeus (Stoll, 1782)
- Leptotes pirithous (Linnaeus, 1767)
- Tuxentius carana kontu (Karsch, 1893)
- Zizeeria knysna (Trimen, 1862)
- Zizina antanossa (Mabille, 1877)
- Zizula hylax (Fabricius, 1775)
- Azanus moriqua (Wallengren, 1857)
- Azanus isis (Drury, 1773)
- Eicochrysops hippocrates (Fabricius, 1793)
- Euchrysops malathana (Boisduval, 1833)
- Euchrysops osiris (Hopffer, 1855)
- Thermoniphas micylus (Cramer, 1780)
- Oboronia guessfeldti (Dewitz, 1879)
- Oboronia ornata (Mabille, 1890)
- Oboronia pseudopunctatus (Strand, 1912)
- Oboronia punctatus (Dewitz, 1879)
- Lepidochrysops parsimon (Fabricius, 1775)
- Lepidochrysops quassi (Karsh, 1895)
- Lepidochrysops synchrematiza (Bethune-Baker, [1923])
- Lepidochrysops victoriae occidentalis Libert & Collins, 2001

== Nymphalidae ==
=== Libytheinae ===
- Libythea labdaca Westwood, 1851

=== Danainae ===
==== Danaini ====
- Danaus chrysippus alcippus (Cramer, 1777)
- Tirumala petiverana (Doubleday, 1847)
- Amauris niavius (Linnaeus, 1758)
- Amauris tartarea Mabille, 1876
- Amauris crawshayi camerunica Joicey & Talbot, 1925
- Amauris damocles (Fabricius, 1793)
- Amauris hecate (Butler, 1866)

=== Satyrinae ===
==== Elymniini ====
- Elymniopsis bammakoo (Westwood, [1851])

==== Melanitini ====
- Gnophodes betsimena parmeno Doubleday, 1849
- Gnophodes chelys (Fabricius, 1793)
- Melanitis leda (Linnaeus, 1758)

==== Satyrini ====
- Bicyclus angulosa (Butler, 1868)
- Bicyclus campus (Karsch, 1893)
- Bicyclus dorothea (Cramer, 1779)
- Bicyclus istaris (Plötz, 1880)
- Bicyclus italus (Hewitson, 1865)
- Bicyclus madetes (Hewitson, 1874)
- Bicyclus maesseni Condamin, 1971
- Bicyclus mandanes Hewitson, 1873
- Bicyclus milyas (Hewitson, 1864)
- Bicyclus procora (Karsch, 1893)
- Bicyclus safitza (Westwood, 1850)
- Bicyclus martius (Fabricius, 1793)
- Bicyclus sandace (Hewitson, 1877)
- Bicyclus sangmelinae Condamin, 1963
- Bicyclus sylvicolus Condamin, 1965
- Bicyclus taenias (Hewitson, 1877)
- Bicyclus vulgaris (Butler, 1868)
- Bicyclus xeneas occidentalis Condamin, 1965
- Heteropsis elisi (Karsch, 1893)
- Ypthima doleta Kirby, 1880
- Ypthima pupillaris Butler, 1888
- Ypthimomorpha itonia (Hewitson, 1865)

=== Charaxinae ===
==== Charaxini ====
- Charaxes varanes vologeses (Mabille, 1876)
- Charaxes fulvescens senegala van Someren, 1975
- Charaxes protoclea Feisthamel, 1850
- Charaxes boueti Feisthamel, 1850
- Charaxes lucretius Cramer, [1775]
- Charaxes lactetinctus Karsch, 1892
- Charaxes jasius Poulton, 1926
- Charaxes epijasius Reiche, 1850
- Charaxes castor (Cramer, 1775)
- Charaxes brutus (Cramer, 1779)
- Charaxes tiridates (Cramer, 1777)
- Charaxes ameliae doumeti Henning, 1989
- Charaxes etesipe (Godart, 1824)
- Charaxes achaemenes atlantica van Someren, 1970
- Charaxes eupale (Drury, 1782)
- Charaxes subornatus couilloudi Plantrou, 1976
- Charaxes anticlea (Drury, 1782)
- Charaxes etheocles (Cramer, 1777)
- Charaxes viola Butler, 1866
- Charaxes paphianus falcata (Butler, 1872)
- Charaxes lycurgus (Fabricius, 1793)
- Charaxes doubledayi Aurivillius, 1899

=== Nymphalinae ===
==== Nymphalini ====
- Vanessa cardui (Linnaeus, 1758)
- Junonia chorimene (Guérin-Méneville, 1844)
- Junonia hierta cebrene Trimen, 1870
- Junonia oenone (Linnaeus, 1758)
- Junonia orithya madagascariensis Guenée, 1865
- Junonia sophia (Fabricius, 1793)
- Junonia stygia (Aurivillius, 1894)
- Junonia terea (Drury, 1773)
- Junonia cymodoce (Cramer, 1777)
- Salamis cacta (Fabricius, 1793)
- Protogoniomorpha anacardii (Linnaeus, 1758)
- Protogoniomorpha parhassus (Drury, 1782)
- Protogoniomorpha cytora (Doubleday, 1847)
- Precis octavia (Cramer, 1777)
- Precis pelarga (Fabricius, 1775)
- Hypolimnas anthedon (Doubleday, 1845)
- Hypolimnas misippus (Linnaeus, 1764)
- Hypolimnas salmacis (Drury, 1773)
- Catacroptera cloanthe ligata Rothschild & Jordan, 1903

=== Cyrestinae ===
==== Cyrestini ====
- Cyrestis camillus (Fabricius, 1781)

=== Biblidinae ===
==== Biblidini ====
- Byblia anvatara crameri Aurivillius, 1894
- Mesoxantha ethosea (Drury, 1782)
- Ariadne enotrea (Cramer, 1779)
- Neptidopsis ophione (Cramer, 1777)
- Eurytela dryope (Cramer, [1775])
- Eurytela hiarbas (Drury, 1782)

==== Epicaliini ====
- Sevenia umbrina (Karsch, 1892)

=== Limenitinae ===
==== Limenitidini ====
- Cymothoe caenis (Drury, 1773)
- Cymothoe coccinata (Hewitson, [1874])
- Pseudoneptis bugandensis ianthe Hemming, 1964
- Pseudacraea eurytus (Linnaeus, 1758)
- Pseudacraea lucretia (Cramer, [1775])
- Pseudacraea semire (Cramer, 1779)

==== Neptidini ====
- Neptis agouale Pierre-Baltus, 1978
- Neptis conspicua Neave, 1904
- Neptis najo Karsch, 1893
- Neptis kiriakoffi Overlaet, 1955
- Neptis metella (Doubleday, 1848)
- Neptis morosa Overlaet, 1955
- Neptis nemetes Hewitson, 1868
- Neptis nysiades Hewitson, 1868
- Neptis puella Aurivillius, 1894
- Neptis serena Overlaet, 1955

==== Adoliadini ====
- Catuna angustatum (Felder & Felder, 1867)
- Catuna crithea (Drury, 1773)
- Euryphura chalcis (Felder & Felder, 1860)
- Euryphura togoensis Suffert, 1904
- Hamanumida daedalus (Fabricius, 1775)
- Aterica galene (Brown, 1776)
- Cynandra opis (Drury, 1773)
- Euriphene ampedusa (Hewitson, 1866)
- Euriphene aridatha transgressa Hecq, 1994
- Euriphene atossa (Hewitson, 1865)
- Euriphene ernestibaumanni (Karsch, 1895)
- Bebearia tentyris (Hewitson, 1866)
- Bebearia mandinga (Felder & Felder, 1860)
- Bebearia oxione (Hewitson, 1866)
- Bebearia mardania (Fabricius, 1793)
- Bebearia cocalia continentalis Hecq, 1988
- Bebearia sophus (Fabricius, 1793)
- Bebearia phantasina (Staudinger, 1891)
- Bebearia demetra (Godart, 1824)
- Euphaedra medon (Linnaeus, 1763)
- Euphaedra xypete (Hewitson, 1865)
- Euphaedra diffusa albocoerulea Hecq, 1976
- Euphaedra sarcoptera (Butler, 1871)
- Euphaedra themis (Hübner, 1807)
- Euphaedra janetta (Butler, 1871)
- Euphaedra ceres (Fabricius, 1775)
- Euphaedra phaethusa (Butler, 1866)
- Euphaedra edwardsii (van der Hoeven, 1845)
- Euphaedra ruspina (Hewitson, 1865)
- Euphaedra harpalyce (Cramer, 1777)
- Euphaedra eupalus (Fabricius, 1781)
- Euptera crowleyi (Kirby, 1889)
- Euptera pluto occidentalis Chovet, 1998
- Euptera zowa Fox, 1965
- Pseudathyma falcata Jackson, 1969

=== Heliconiinae ===
==== Acraeini ====
- Acraea eugenia Karsch, 1893
- Acraea neobule Doubleday, 1847
- Acraea quirina (Fabricius, 1781)
- Acraea zetes (Linnaeus, 1758)
- Acraea abdera eginopsis Aurivillius, 1899
- Acraea egina (Cramer, 1775)
- Acraea caecilia (Fabricius, 1781)
- Acraea pseudegina Westwood, 1852
- Acraea rogersi Hewitson, 1873
- Acraea alcinoe Felder & Felder, 1865
- Acraea epaea (Cramer, 1779)
- Acraea umbra (Drury, 1782)
- Acraea vestalis Felder & Felder, 1865
- Acraea acerata Hewitson, 1874
- Acraea alciope Hewitson, 1852
- Acraea bonasia (Fabricius, 1775)
- Acraea encedon (Linnaeus, 1758)
- Acraea serena (Fabricius, 1775)
- Acraea jodutta (Fabricius, 1793)
- Acraea lycoa Godart, 1819
- Acraea orestia Hewitson, 1874
- Acraea peneleos Ward, 1871
- Acraea pharsalus Ward, 1871
- Acraea orina Hewitson, 1874
- Acraea translucida Eltringham, 1912
- Acraea perenna Doubleday, 1847

==== Vagrantini ====
- Lachnoptera anticlia (Hübner, 1819)
- Phalanta eurytis (Doubleday, 1847)
- Phalanta phalantha aethiopica (Rothschild & Jordan, 1903)

== Hesperiidae ==
=== Coeliadinae ===
- Coeliades chalybe (Westwood, 1852)
- Coeliades forestan (Stoll, [1782])
- Coeliades hanno (Plötz, 1879)
- Coeliades pisistratus (Fabricius, 1793)
- Pyrrhochalcia iphis (Drury, 1773)

=== Pyrginae ===
==== Celaenorrhinini ====
- Katreus johnstoni (Butler, 1888)
- Celaenorrhinus galenus (Fabricius, 1793)
- Celaenorrhinus proxima maesseni Berger, 1976
- Eretis lugens (Rogenhofer, 1891)
- Eretis melania Mabille, 1891
- Eretis plistonicus (Plötz, 1879)
- Sarangesa bouvieri (Mabille, 1877)
- Sarangesa laelius (Mabille, 1877)
- Sarangesa majorella (Mabille, 1891)
- Sarangesa tertullianus (Fabricius, 1793)
- Sarangesa thecla (Plötz, 1879)

==== Tagiadini ====
- Tagiades flesus (Fabricius, 1781)
- Eagris denuba (Plötz, 1879)
- Eagris hereus quaterna (Mabille, 1890)
- Eagris tetrastigma subolivescens (Holland, 1892)
- Procampta rara Holland, 1892
- Caprona adelica Karsch, 1892
- Abantis bismarcki Karsch, 1892

==== Carcharodini ====
- Spialia ploetzi occidentalis de Jong, 1977
- Spialia spio (Linnaeus, 1764)
- Gomalia elma (Trimen, 1862)

=== Hesperiinae ===
==== Aeromachini ====
- Astictopterus abjecta (Snellen, 1872)
- Astictopterus anomoeus (Plötz, 1879)
- Gorgyra aretina (Hewitson, 1878)
- Gorgyra diversata Evans, 1937
- Gorgyra pali Evans, 1937
- Ceratrichia nothus enantia (Karsch, 1893)
- Pardaleodes edipus (Stoll, 1781)
- Pardaleodes incerta murcia (Plötz, 1883)
- Pardaleodes sator (Westwood, 1852)
- Pardaleodes tibullus (Fabricius, 1793)
- Xanthodisca astrape (Holland, 1892)
- Osmodes laronia (Hewitson, 1868)
- Osmodes thora (Plötz, 1884)
- Acleros mackenii olaus (Plötz, 1884)
- Semalea pulvina (Plötz, 1879)
- Hypoleucis tripunctata Mabille, 1891
- Meza meza (Hewitson, 1877)
- Paronymus budonga (Evans, 1938)
- Andronymus caesar (Fabricius, 1793)
- Zophopetes cerymica (Hewitson, 1867)
- Zophopetes ganda Evans, 1937
- Artitropa comus (Stoll, 1782)
- Mopala orma (Plötz, 1879)
- Gretna balenge zowa Lindsey & Miller, 1965
- Gretna cylinda (Hewitson, 1876)
- Gretna waga (Plötz, 1886)
- Pteroteinon laufella (Hewitson, 1868)
- Leona leonora (Plötz, 1879)
- Leona stoehri (Karsch, 1893)
- Leona meloui (Riley, 1926)
- Monza cretacea (Snellen, 1872)
- Melphina flavina Lindsey & Miller, 1965
- Melphina unistriga (Holland, 1893)
- Fresna cojo (Karsch, 1893)
- Fresna netopha (Hewitson, 1878)
- Platylesches moritili (Wallengren, 1857)

==== Baorini ====
- Pelopidas mathias (Fabricius, 1798)
- Pelopidas thrax (Hübner, 1821)
- Borbo borbonica (Boisduval, 1833)
- Borbo fatuellus (Hopffer, 1855)
- Borbo gemella (Mabille, 1884)
- Borbo perobscura (Druce, 1912)

== See also ==
- Wildlife of Togo
- List of moths of Togo
