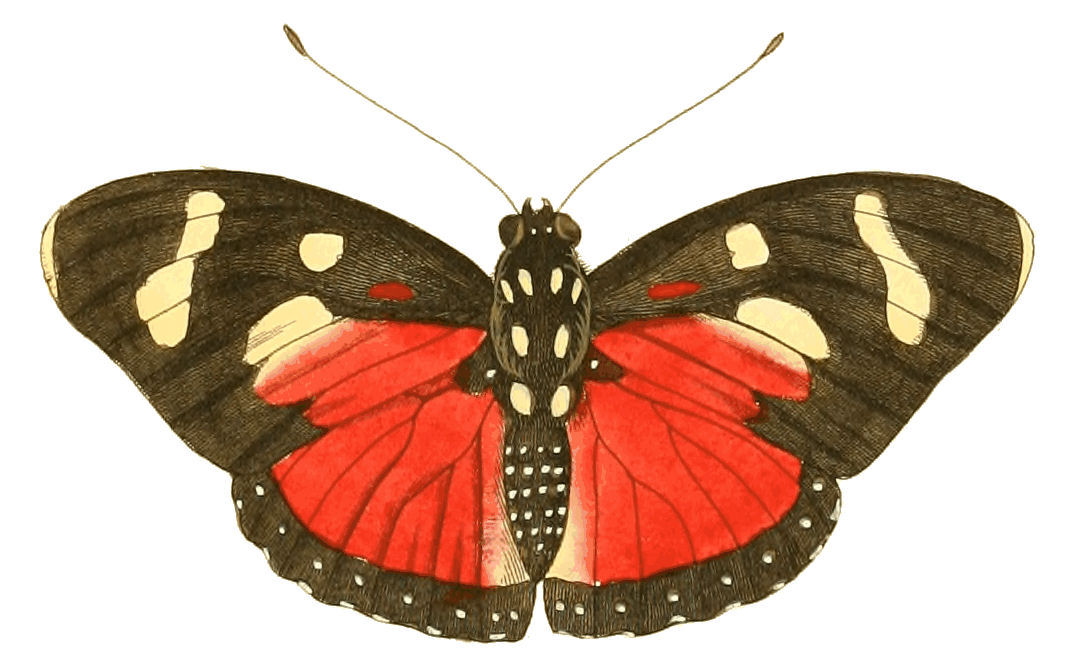

Scientific classification
- Kingdom: Animalia
- Phylum: Arthropoda
- Clade: Pancrustacea
- Class: Insecta
- Order: Lepidoptera
- Family: Nymphalidae
- Genus: Euphaedra
- Species: E. perseis

Binomial name
- Euphaedra perseis (Drury, 1773)

Synonyms
- Papilio perseis Drury, 1773; Euphaedra (Euphaedrana) perseis; Euphaedra perseis ab. pseudeleus Hall, 1935

= Euphaedra perseis =

Species of butterfly

Euphaedra perseis, the Perseis mimic forester, is a butterfly in the family Nymphalidae. It is found in Guinea (Conakry), Sierra Leone, Liberia, Ivory Coast and western Ghana. It was first described by Dru Drury in 1773.

The habitat consists of wet forests. Adults mimic a day-flying moth of the genus Xanthospilopteryx. They are attracted to fallen fruit.

Torben Larsen developed a species numbering system for his 2005 publication Butterflies of West Africa. This species is #1117. The 'Larsen' numbers have since been used with permission in A Sharp Eye on Butterflies of Ghana.

== Description ==
Upperside: Antennae black. Thorax and abdomen black, spotted with white. Anterior wings black, the tips edged with white; two pale lemon-coloured spots are situated in the centre of the wings, one being long, the other round; between which and the tips is a long lemon streak, extending from the anterior almost to the external edges; a large patch of a dull red is also placed on the hinder part of the wings, extending along the posterior edges from the shoulders almost to the lower corners. Posterior wings dull red coloured, bordered with black, whereon are seven small white spots placed along the external edges, and reaching from the upper to the abdominal corners. All the wings are dentated.

Underside: palpi yellow. Breast white. Legs brown. Thighs white. Anterior wings marked as on the upperside, but the colours are much duller. Posterior wings dirty red, bordered with black, whereon are eight white spots, larger than those on the upper side; the colours of the whole being much duller and fainter than on that side. Wingspan 3 1/4 inches (82 mm).

Seitz E. perseis Drury (42 a). Forewing with a red-yellow hindmarginal spot, covering the base of cellules 1 a and 1 b and reaching the median transverse band; this consists of 3 yellow spots, the one in cellule 1 b small and narrow and the one in the cell rounded and separate; the marginal band of the hindwing on both surfaces with white submarginal spots and beneath continued along the costal margin to vein 8, filling up cellule 7 except at the base and broadly edged with light yellow proximally. Hindwing produced at the anal angle as in ruspina. Sierra Leone and Liberia.

== Similar species ==
Other members of the Euphaedra eleus species group q.v.
