= Celaenorrhinus leona =

Scientific classification
- Kingdom: Animalia
- Phylum: Arthropoda
- Clade: Pancrustacea
- Class: Insecta
- Order: Lepidoptera
- Family: Hesperiidae
- Genus: Celaenorrhinus
- Species: C. leona

Binomial name
- Celaenorrhinus leona Berger, 1975

Species of butterfly

Celaenorrhinus leona, commonly known as the Sierra Leone sprite, is a species of butterfly in the family Hesperiidae. It is found in Guinea, Sierra Leone, the Ivory Coast and Ghana. The habitat consists of forests.
