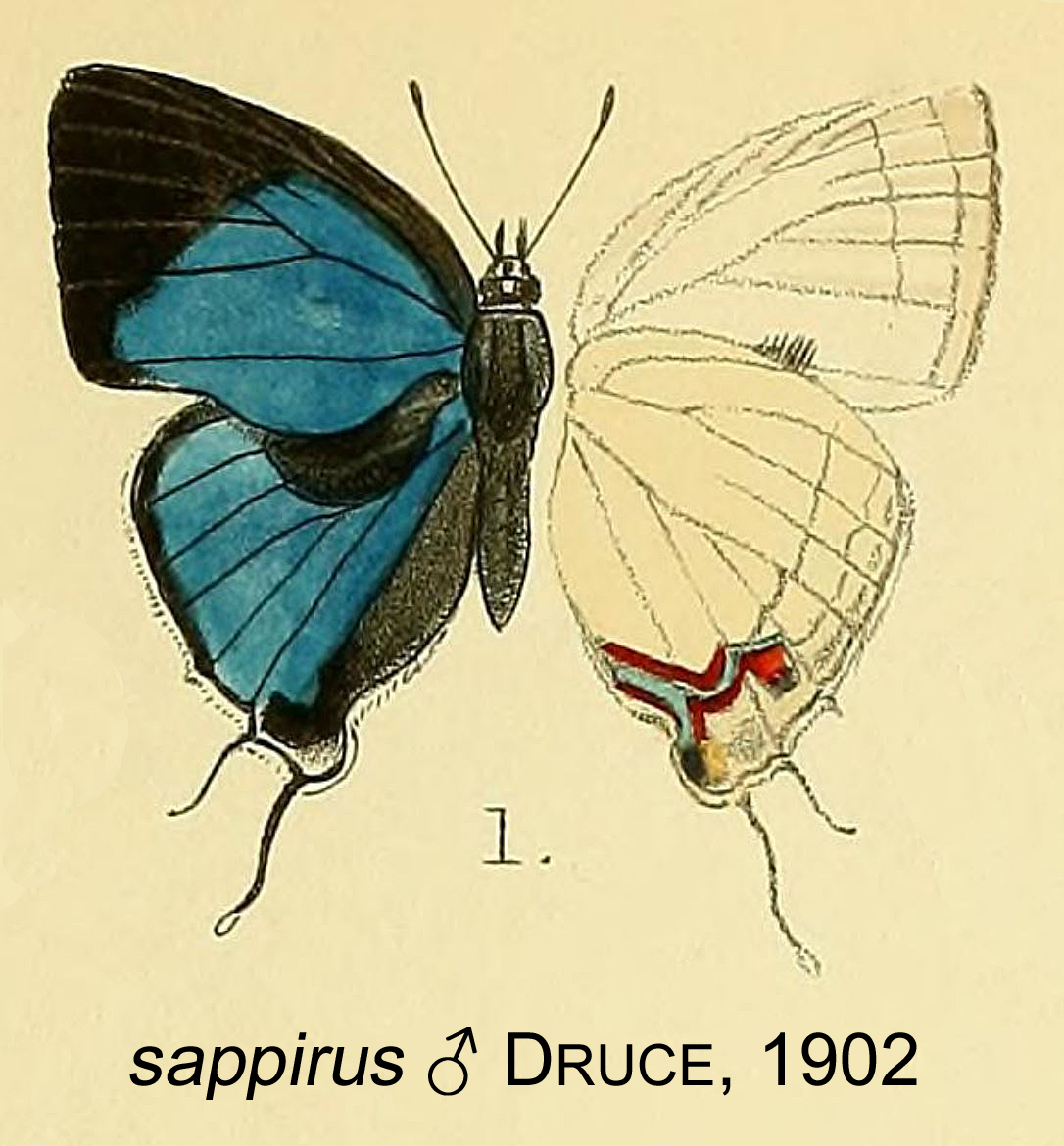

Scientific classification
- Kingdom: Animalia
- Phylum: Arthropoda
- Class: Insecta
- Order: Lepidoptera
- Family: Lycaenidae
- Genus: Iolaus
- Species: I. sappirus

Binomial name
- Iolaus sappirus (H. H. Druce, 1902)

Synonyms
- Epamera sappirus H. H. Druce, 1902; Iolaus (Epamera) sappirus

= Iolaus sappirus =

Species of butterfly

Iolaus sappirus, the jewel sapphire, is a butterfly in the family Lycaenidae. The species was first described by Hamilton Herbert Druce in 1902. It is found in Sierra Leone, Liberia, Ivory Coast, Ghana, Nigeria (the western part of the country and the Cross River loop), Cameroon, the Republic of the Congo and the Democratic Republic of the Congo (Kivu and Tshopo). The habitat consists of forests.
