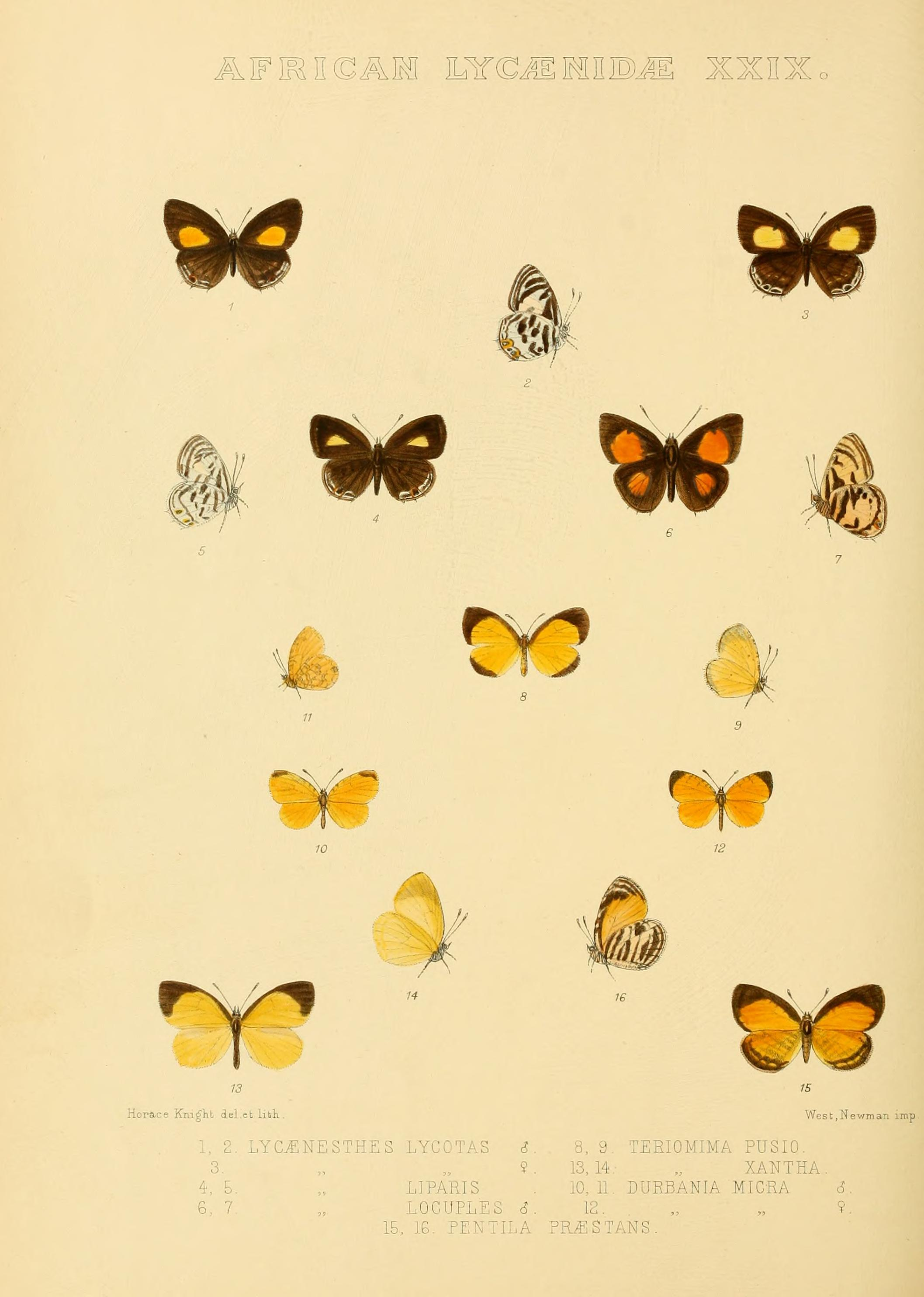
- Figures 6 and 7

Scientific classification
- Domain: Eukaryota
- Kingdom: Animalia
- Phylum: Arthropoda
- Class: Insecta
- Order: Lepidoptera
- Family: Lycaenidae
- Genus: Anthene
- Species: A. locuples

Binomial name
- Anthene locuples (Grose-Smith, 1898)

Synonyms
- Lycaenesthes locuples Grose-Smith, 1898; Anthene (Anthene) locuples

= Anthene locuples =

Curious ciliate blue

Species of butterfly

Anthene locuples, the curious ciliate blue, is a butterfly in the family Lycaenidae. It is found in Ghana, Nigeria (west and the Cross River loop), Cameroon, the Republic of the Congo, the Central African Republic and the Democratic Republic of the Congo (Kinshasa).

Adults are known to mud-puddle.
