= Hypolycaena dubia =

Scientific classification
- Kingdom: Animalia
- Phylum: Arthropoda
- Clade: Pancrustacea
- Class: Insecta
- Order: Lepidoptera
- Family: Lycaenidae
- Genus: Hypolycaena
- Species: H. dubia

Binomial name
- Hypolycaena dubia Aurivillius, 1895

Species of insect

Hypolycaena dubia, the dubious fairy hairstreak, is a butterfly in the family Lycaenidae. It is found in Guinea, Sierra Leone, Liberia, Ivory Coast, Ghana, Togo, Nigeria (the southern part of the country and the Cross River loop), Cameroon, the Republic of the Congo, the Central African Republic, the Democratic Republic of the Congo (from the southern part of the country to Shaba and the north-east) and Uganda. The habitat consists of forests.

Torben Larsen developed a species numbering system for his 2005 publication Butterflies of West Africa. This species is #450. The 'Larsen' numbers have since been used with permission in A Sharp Eye on Butterflies of Ghana.
