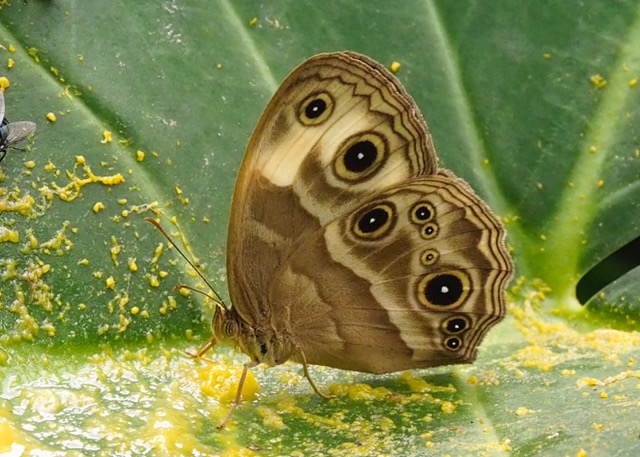
- Bicyclus xeneas occidentalis female in Ghana

Scientific classification
- Kingdom: Animalia
- Phylum: Arthropoda
- Clade: Pancrustacea
- Class: Insecta
- Order: Lepidoptera
- Family: Nymphalidae
- Genus: Bicyclus
- Species: B. xeneas

Binomial name
- Bicyclus xeneas (Hewitson, 1866)

Synonyms
- Mycalesis xeneas Hewitson, 1866; Mycalesis phalanthus Staudinger, 1887; Mycalesis phalanthus var. phalanthoides Strand, 1913

= Bicyclus xeneas =

Species of butterfly

Bicyclus xeneas, the stately bush brown, is a butterfly in the family Nymphalidae. It is found in Guinea, Sierra Leone, Ivory Coast, Ghana, Togo, Benin, Nigeria, Cameroon, Equatorial Guinea, Gabon, the Republic of the Congo, and the Democratic Republic of the Congo. The habitat consists of forests.

== Subspecies ==
- Bicyclus xeneas xeneas (Nigeria, Cameroon, Bioko, Gabon, Congo, Democratic Republic of the Congo)
- Bicyclus xeneas occidentalis Condamin, 1965 (Guinea, Sierra Leone, Ivory Coast, Ghana, Togo, Benin, western and southern Nigeria)

Torben Larsen developed a species numbering system for his 2005 publication Butterflies of West Africa. The subspecies occidentalis is #663. The 'Larsen' numbers have since been used with permission in A Sharp Eye on Butterflies of Ghana.
