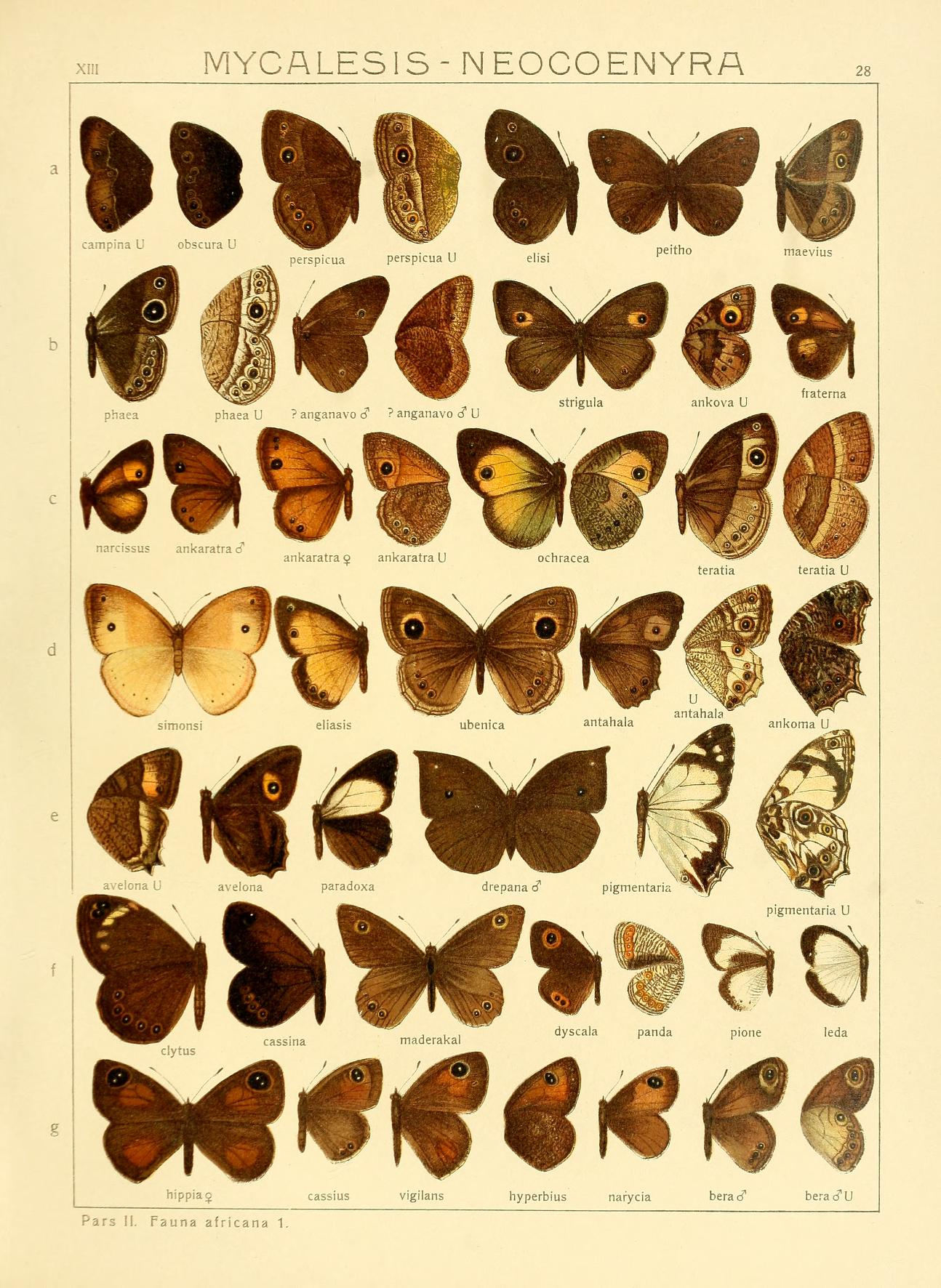
- In Adalbert Seitz's Fauna Africana

Scientific classification
- Kingdom: Animalia
- Phylum: Arthropoda
- Clade: Pancrustacea
- Class: Insecta
- Order: Lepidoptera
- Family: Nymphalidae
- Genus: Heteropsis
- Species: H. elisi

Binomial name
- Heteropsis elisi (Karsch, 1893)

Synonyms
- Mycalesis elisi Karsch, 1893; Henotesia elisi; Henotesia elisi var. evanida Thurau, 1903; Henotesia elisi tanzanica Kielland, 1994; Henotesia elisi uluguru Kielland, 1990

= Brakefieldia elisi =

Species of butterfly

Heteropsis elisi, the western patroller, is a butterfly in the family Nymphalidae. It is found in Guinea, Sierra Leone, Ivory Coast, Ghana, Togo and Tanzania. The nominate subspecies is found in dense Guinea savanna and the margins of semi-deciduous forest. Subspecies B. e. uluguru is found in open grassland and shrubs at altitudes between 1,000 and 1,400 meters.

== Subspecies ==
- Brakefieldia elisi elisi (Guinea, Sierra Leone, Ivory Coast, Ghana, Togo)
- Brakefieldia elisi tanzanica (Kielland, 1994) (Tanzania: Bondwa Mountain)
- Brakefieldia elisi uluguru (Kielland, 1990) (Tanzania: east to the Uluguru Mountains)

Torben Larsen developed a species numbering system for his 2005 publication Butterflies of West Africa. The nominate subspecies was described as Henotesia elisi and given #713. The 'Larsen' number has been used with permission in A Sharp Eye on Butterflies of Ghana, with the species now described as Brakefieldia elisi.
