= Mimacraea maesseni =

Scientific classification
- Kingdom: Animalia
- Phylum: Arthropoda
- Clade: Pancrustacea
- Class: Insecta
- Order: Lepidoptera
- Family: Lycaenidae
- Genus: Mimacraea
- Species: M. maesseni

Binomial name
- Mimacraea maesseni Libert, 2000

Species of butterfly

Mimacraea maesseni, the Maessen's acraea mimic, is a butterfly in the family Lycaenidae. It is found in Ghana (the Volta region), Togo and southern Nigeria. The habitat consists of forests.

Torben Larsen developed a species numbering system for his 2005 publication Butterflies of West Africa. This species is #181. The 'Larsen' numbers have since been used with permission in A Sharp Eye on Butterflies of Ghana.
