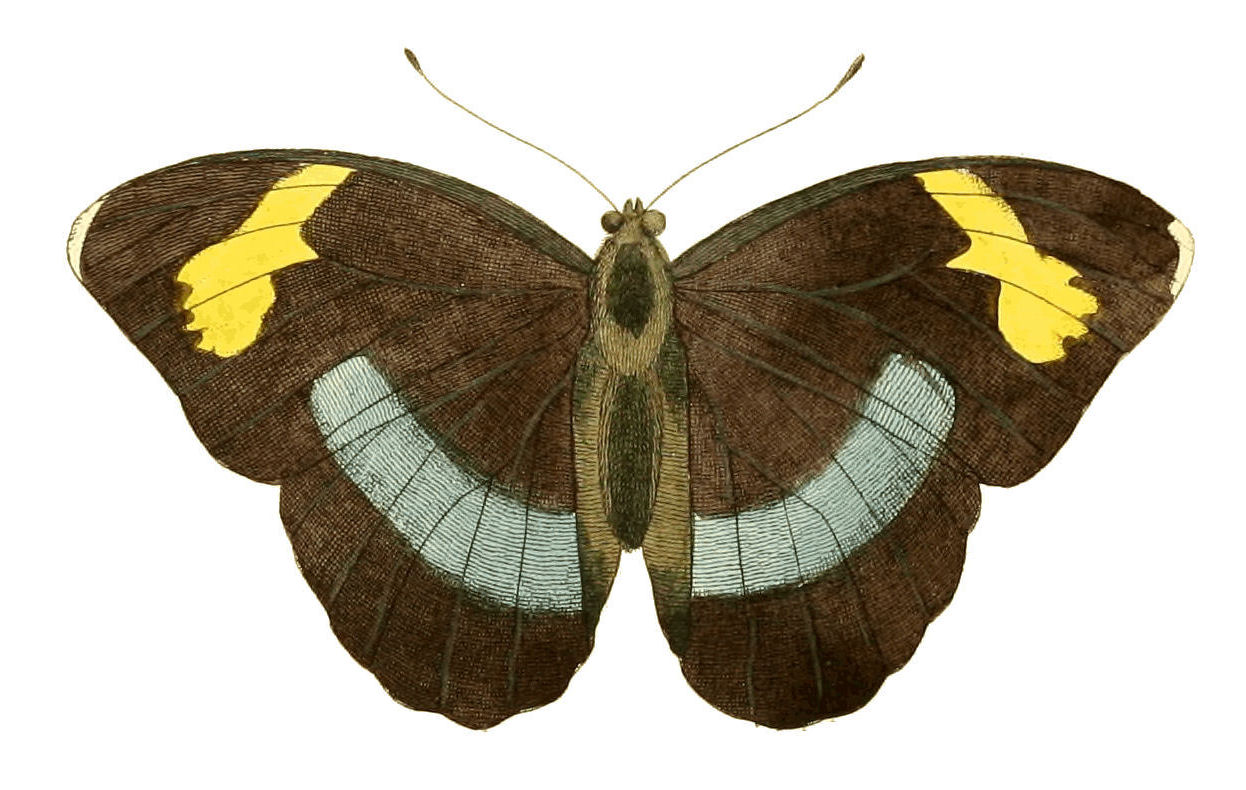

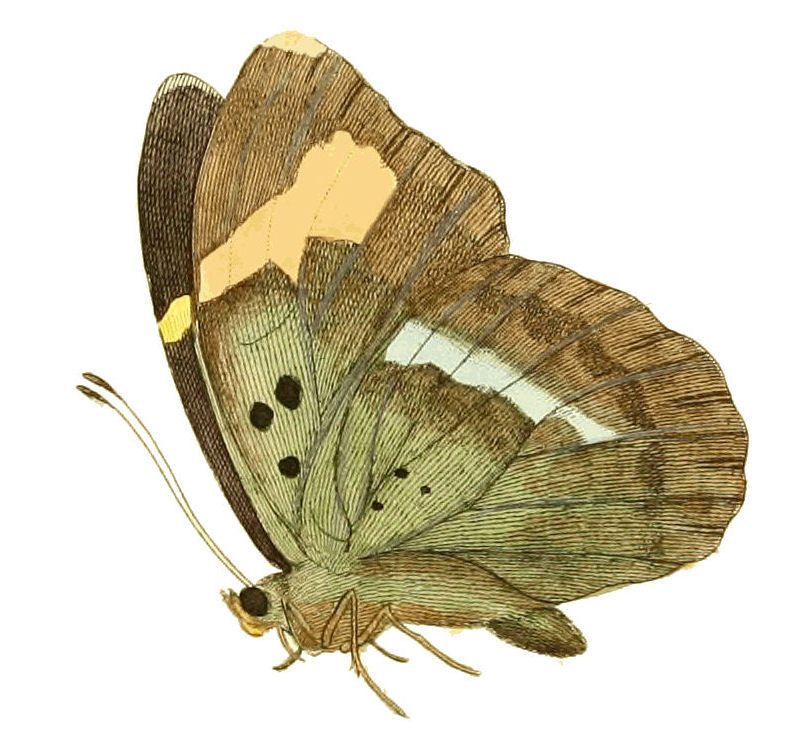

Scientific classification
- Kingdom: Animalia
- Phylum: Arthropoda
- Clade: Pancrustacea
- Class: Insecta
- Order: Lepidoptera
- Family: Nymphalidae
- Genus: Euphaedra
- Species: E. eupalus

Binomial name
- Euphaedra eupalus (Fabricius, 1781)

Synonyms
- Papilio eupalus Fabricius, 1781; Euphaedra (Euphaedrana) eupalus; Papilio erithonius Fabricius, 1787; Euryphene swanzyana Butler, 1868

= Euphaedra eupalus =

Species of butterfly

Euphaedra eupalus, the western blue-banded forester, is a butterfly in the family Nymphalidae. It is found in Guinea, Sierra Leone, Liberia, Ivory Coast, Ghana and Togo.

The habitat consists of wet forests. Adults are attracted to fallen fruit.

== Description ==
Upperside: antennae black, lighter at the tips. Head black. Thorax and abdomen dark brown. Anterior wings dark red brown, tipped with white; but next to the shoulders of a purplish hue, with a dark yellow streak near the tips, extending obliquely from the anterior towards the external edge. Posterior wings also red brown; but towards the middle and shoulders of a purplish blue, which they reflect more or less according to the position they are held in.

Under side: palpi and breast yellow. Anterior wings olive brown, tipped with white; but along the external edges of a hazel colour, and near the shoulders having three round black spots on each. Posterior wings similar to the anterior, being of a brown olive, variegated, and clouded, with three small spots placed near the shoulders, as in the superior ones. All the wings are a little dentated (tooth like). Wingspan a little over 3 1/2 inches (90 mm).

Seitz E. eupalus F. is quite similar above to Euphaedra harpalyce but differs beneath in both wings or at least the hindwing having in the middle a curved transverse row of free white spots, usually bordered with black proximally. Sierra Leone to the Congo.

Torben Larsen developed a species numbering system for his 2005 publication Butterflies of West Africa. This species is #1119. The 'Larsen' numbers have since been used with permission in A Sharp Eye on Butterflies of Ghana.
