= Liptena pearmani =

Scientific classification
- Kingdom: Animalia
- Phylum: Arthropoda
- Clade: Pancrustacea
- Class: Insecta
- Order: Lepidoptera
- Family: Lycaenidae
- Genus: Liptena
- Species: L. pearmani

Binomial name
- Liptena pearmani Stempffer, Bennett & May, 1974

Species of butterfly

Liptena pearmani, the Pearman's liptena, is a butterfly in the family Lycaenidae. It is found in Ghana (the Volta Region), Togo and western Nigeria. The habitat consists of forests.

Torben Larsen developed a species numbering system for his 2005 publication Butterflies of West Africa. This species is #227. The 'Larsen' numbers have since been used with permission in A Sharp Eye on Butterflies of Ghana.
