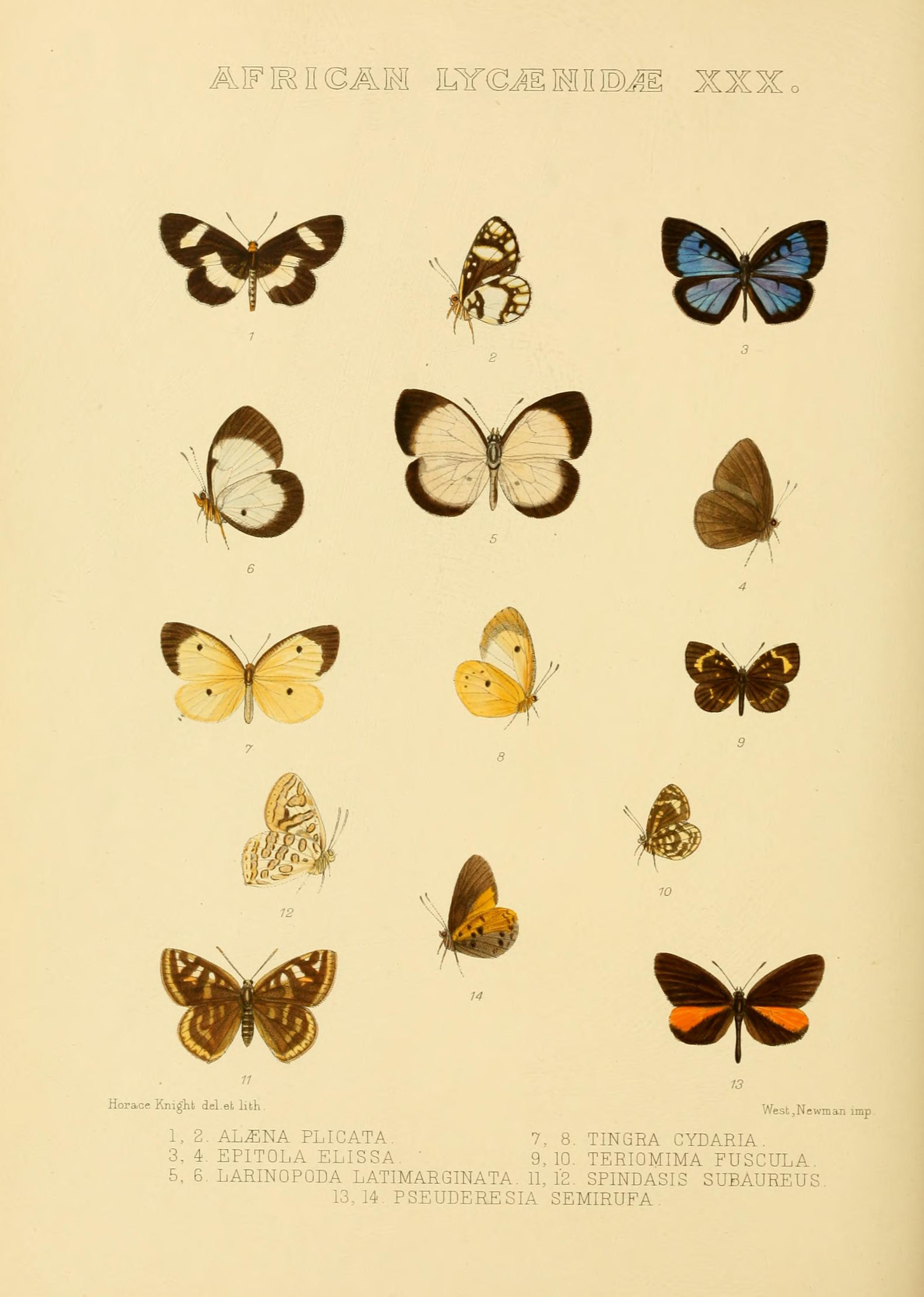
- Figures 5 and 6

Scientific classification
- Kingdom: Animalia
- Phylum: Arthropoda
- Clade: Pancrustacea
- Class: Insecta
- Order: Lepidoptera
- Family: Lycaenidae
- Genus: Larinopoda
- Species: L. aspidos

Binomial name
- Larinopoda aspidos H. H. Druce, 1890

Synonyms
- Larinopoda latimarginata Grose-Smith, 1898; Larinopoda brenda H. H. Druce, 1903

= Larinopoda aspidos =

Species of butterfly

Larinopoda aspidos, the Nigerian pierid blue, is a butterfly in the family Lycaenidae. The species was first described by Hamilton Herbert Druce in 1890. It is found in Ghana (the Volta Region), Togo and Nigeria (south and the Cross River loop). The habitat consists of forests.

Torben Larsen developed a species numbering system for his 2005 publication Butterflies of West Africa. This species is #264. The 'Larsen' numbers have since been used with permission in A Sharp Eye on Butterflies of Ghana.
