= Neptis najo =

Scientific classification
- Kingdom: Animalia
- Phylum: Arthropoda
- Class: Insecta
- Order: Lepidoptera
- Family: Nymphalidae
- Genus: Neptis
- Species: N. najo

Binomial name
- Neptis najo Karsch, 1893

Species of butterfly

Neptis najo, or Karsch's sailer, is a butterfly in the family Nymphalidae. It is found in Senegal, Guinea, Sierra Leone, Ivory Coast, Ghana and Togo. The habitat consists of forests.
