= Lachnocnema vuattouxi =

Western woolly legs

Scientific classification
- Kingdom: Animalia
- Phylum: Arthropoda
- Class: Insecta
- Order: Lepidoptera
- Family: Lycaenidae
- Genus: Lachnocnema
- Species: L. vuattouxi

Binomial name
- Lachnocnema vuattouxi Libert, 1996

Species of butterfly

Lachnocnema vuattouxi, the western woolly legs, is a butterfly in the family Lycaenidae. It is found in Senegal, Guinea, Liberia, Ivory Coast, Burkina Faso, Ghana, Togo, Benin, Nigeria, from Cameroon to Uganda, Kenya and northern Tanzania. The habitat consists of open areas in Guinea savanna and open areas in the vicinity of forests, including degraded agricultural lands.
