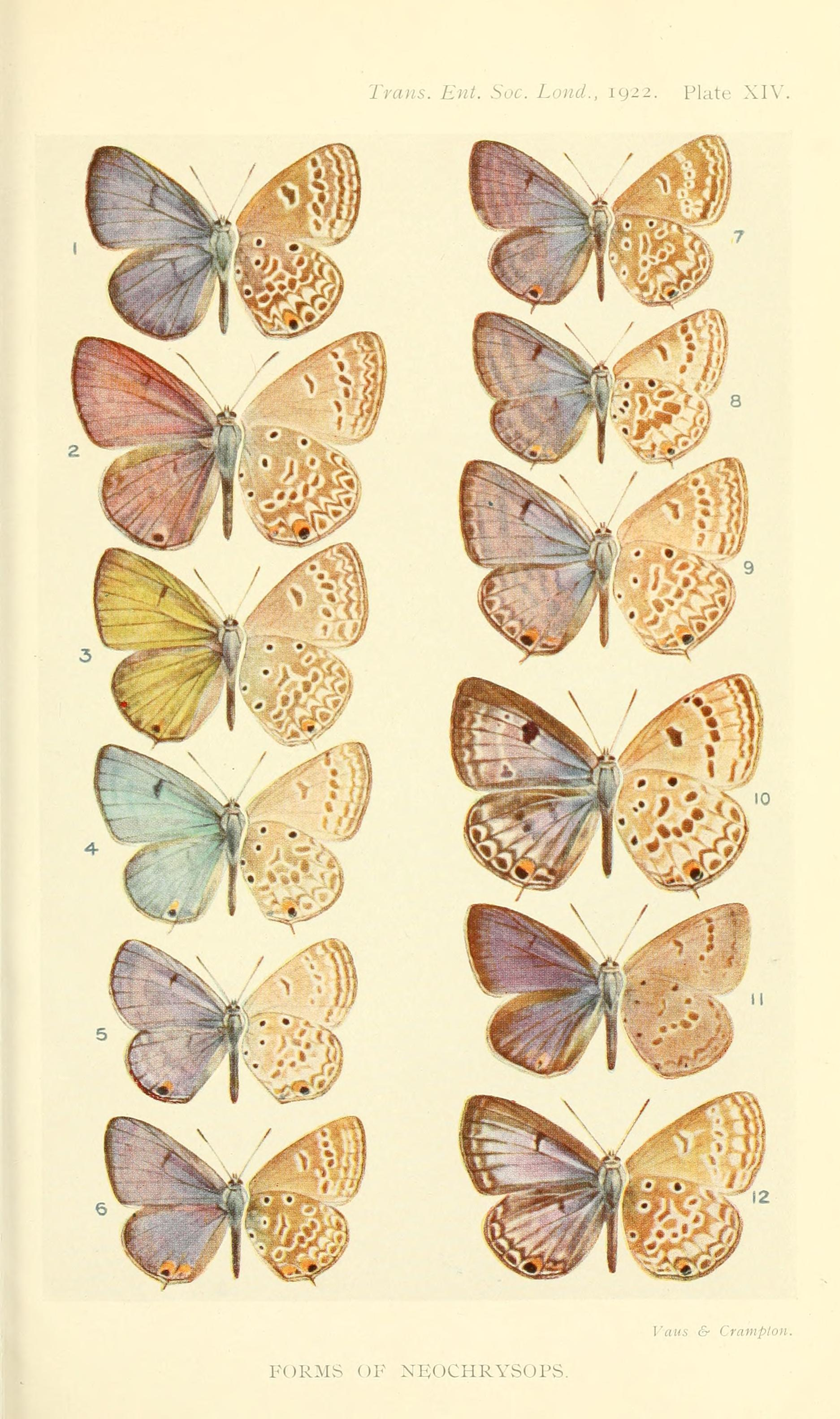

Scientific classification
- Kingdom: Animalia
- Phylum: Arthropoda
- Clade: Pancrustacea
- Class: Insecta
- Order: Lepidoptera
- Family: Lycaenidae
- Genus: Lepidochrysops
- Species: L. synchrematiza

Binomial name
- Lepidochrysops synchrematiza (Bethune-Baker, [1923])

Synonyms
- Neochrysops synchrematiza Bethune-Baker, [1923]; Neochrysops sylvius Hulstaert, 1924

= Lepidochrysops synchrematiza =

Species of butterfly

Lepidochrysops synchrematiza, the untailed blue giant Cupid, is a butterfly in the family Lycaenidae. It is found in Senegal, the Gambia, Guinea, Sierra Leone, Liberia, Ivory Coast, Ghana and Togo. The habitat consists of the forest/savanna transition zone.

Torben Larsen developed a species numbering system for his 2005 publication Butterflies of West Africa. This species is #611. The 'Larsen' numbers have since been used with permission in A Sharp Eye on Butterflies of Ghana.
