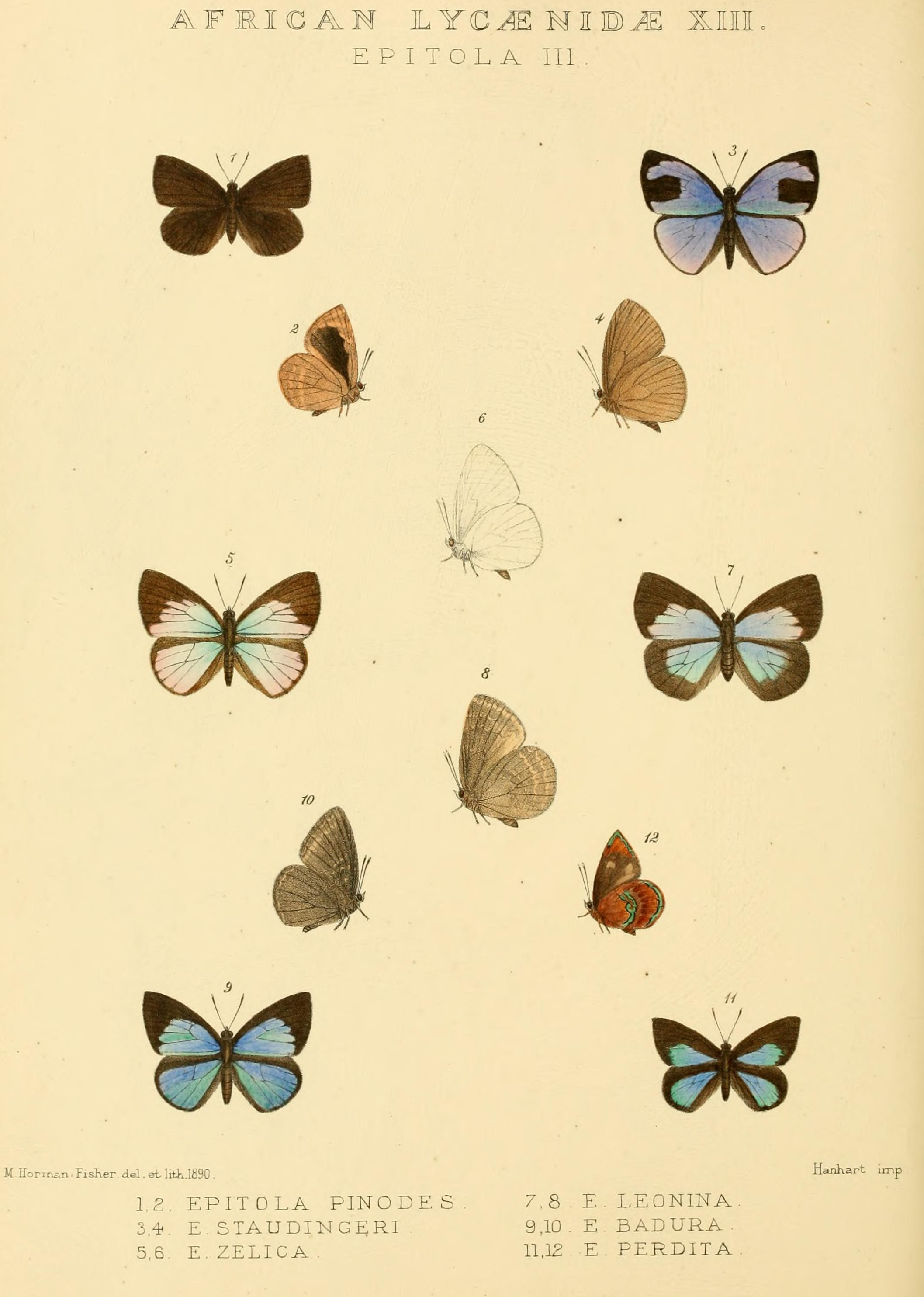

Scientific classification
- Kingdom: Animalia
- Phylum: Arthropoda
- Clade: Pancrustacea
- Class: Insecta
- Order: Lepidoptera
- Family: Lycaenidae
- Genus: Stempfferia
- Species: S. leonina

Binomial name
- Stempfferia leonina (Staudinger, 1888)

Synonyms
- Epitola leonina Staudinger, 1888; Stempfferia (Cercenia) leonina

= Stempfferia leonina =

Species of butterfly

Stempfferia leonina, the western scalloped epitola, is a butterfly in the family Lycaenidae. It is found in Guinea, Sierra Leone, Ivory Coast, Ghana and Togo. The habitat consists of forests.

Torben Larsen developed a species numbering system for his 2005 publication Butterflies of West Africa. This species is #330. The 'Larsen' numbers have since been used with permission in A Sharp Eye on Butterflies of Ghana.
