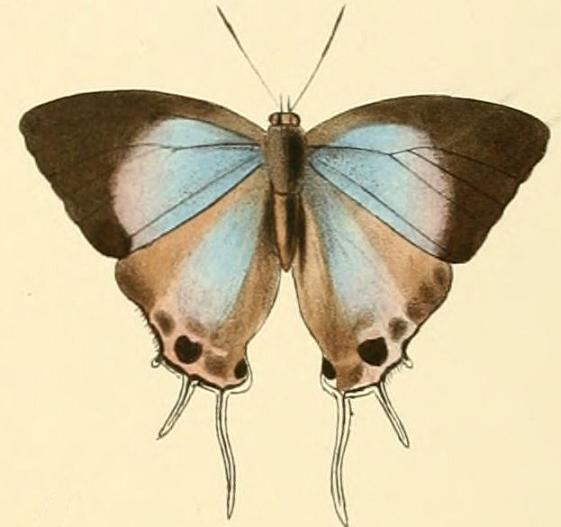

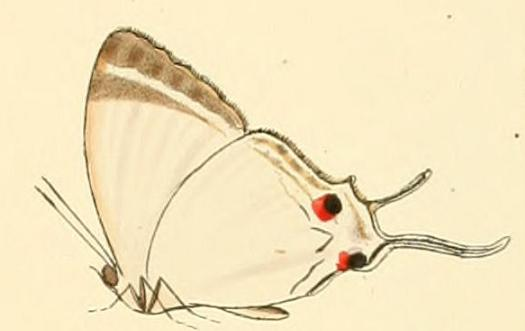

Scientific classification
- Kingdom: Animalia
- Phylum: Arthropoda
- Clade: Pancrustacea
- Class: Insecta
- Order: Lepidoptera
- Family: Lycaenidae
- Genus: Iolaus
- Species: I. maesa

Binomial name
- Iolaus maesa (Hewitson, 1862)

Synonyms
- Myrina maesa Hewitson, 1862; Iolaus (Epamera) maesa

= Iolaus maesa =

Species of butterfly

Iolaus maesa, the chocolate-bordered sapphire, is a butterfly in the family Lycaenidae. It is found in northern Guinea, Sierra Leone, Ivory Coast, Ghana, Togo, Nigeria (south and the Cross River loop), Cameroon, the Republic of the Congo, the Democratic Republic of the Congo (Tshopo) and Uganda. The habitat consists of forests.

The larvae feed on the flowers of Loranthus incanus.

Torben Larsen developed a species numbering system for his 2005 publication Butterflies of West Africa. This species is #437. The 'Larsen' numbers have since been used with permission in A Sharp Eye on Butterflies of Ghana.
