= Pilodeudorix aurivilliusi =

Scientific classification
- Kingdom: Animalia
- Phylum: Arthropoda
- Clade: Pancrustacea
- Class: Insecta
- Order: Lepidoptera
- Family: Lycaenidae
- Genus: Pilodeudorix
- Species: P. aurivilliusi

Binomial name
- Pilodeudorix aurivilliusi (Stempffer, 1954)

Synonyms
- Deudorix (Diopetes) aurivilliusi Stempffer, 1954

Species of butterfly

Pilodeudorix aurivilliusi, the Aurivillius' diopetes, is a butterfly in the family Lycaenidae. It is found in Guinea-Bissau, Sierra Leone, Ivory Coast, Liberia, Ghana and Togo. The habitat consists of forests.

Adults have been recorded feeding from the flowers of Cleistopholis patens.
