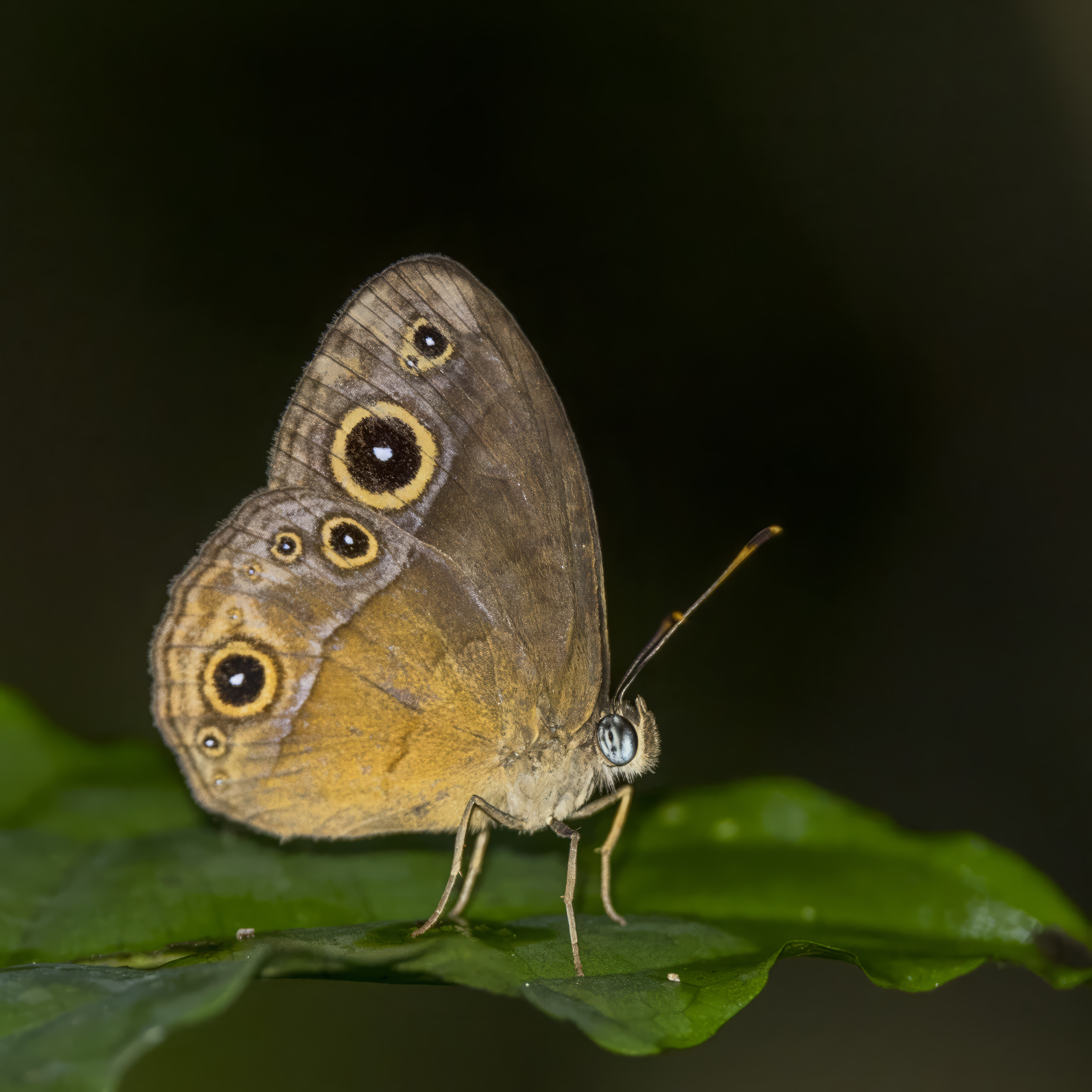
- In Ghana

Scientific classification
- Kingdom: Animalia
- Phylum: Arthropoda
- Clade: Pancrustacea
- Class: Insecta
- Order: Lepidoptera
- Family: Nymphalidae
- Genus: Bicyclus
- Species: B. procora

Binomial name
- Bicyclus procora (Karsch, 1893)

Synonyms
- Mycalesis procora Karsch, 1893; Mycalesis benina Grünberg, 1911

= Bicyclus procora =

Cinnamon bush brown

Species of butterfly

Bicyclus procora, the cinnamon bush brown, is a butterfly in the family Nymphalidae. It is found in Guinea, Sierra Leone, Liberia, Ivory Coast, Ghana, Togo, Nigeria, Cameroon, the Democratic Republic of the Congo and Uganda. The habitat consists of deep forests of good quality.

Torben Larsen developed a species numbering system for his 2005 publication Butterflies of West Africa. This species is #678. The 'Larsen' numbers have since been used with permission in A Sharp Eye on Butterflies of Ghana.
