= Bicyclus maesseni =

Maessen's ignoble bush brown

Scientific classification
- Kingdom: Animalia
- Phylum: Arthropoda
- Clade: Pancrustacea
- Class: Insecta
- Order: Lepidoptera
- Family: Nymphalidae
- Genus: Bicyclus
- Species: B. maesseni

Binomial name
- Bicyclus maesseni Condamin, 1971

Species of butterfly

Bicyclus maesseni, or Maessen's ignoble bush brown, is a butterfly in the family Nymphalidae. It is found in eastern Ivory Coast, Ghana, Togo and Nigeria.The habitat consists of primary and secondary forests with a closed canopy, usually with tangled undergrowth.

Torben Larsen developed a species numbering system for his 2005 publication Butterflies of West Africa. This species is #683. The 'Larsen' numbers have since been used with permission in A Sharp Eye on Butterflies of Ghana.
