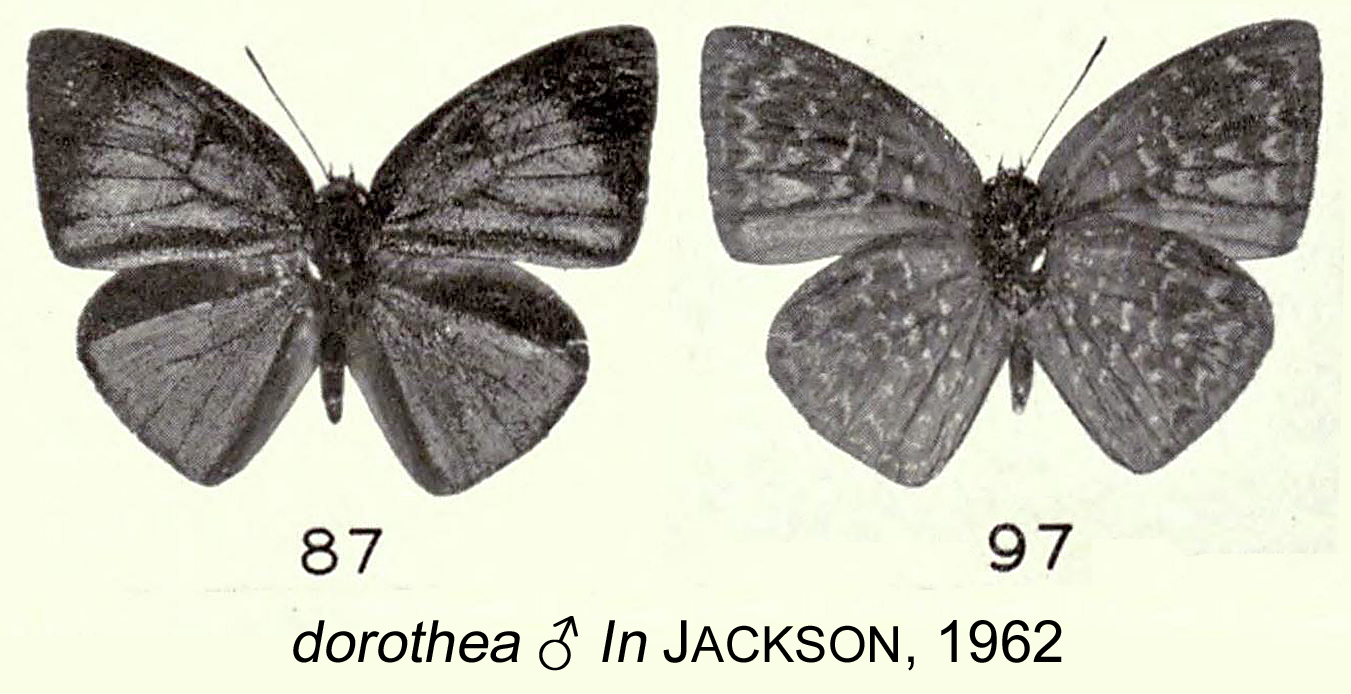

Scientific classification
- Domain: Eukaryota
- Kingdom: Animalia
- Phylum: Arthropoda
- Class: Insecta
- Order: Lepidoptera
- Family: Lycaenidae
- Genus: Stempfferia
- Species: S. dorothea

Binomial name
- Stempfferia dorothea (Bethune-Baker, 1904)

Synonyms
- Epitola dorothea Bethune-Baker, 1904; Stempfferia (Cercenia) dorothea

= Stempfferia dorothea =

Species of butterfly

Stempfferia dorothea is a butterfly in the family Lycaenidae. It is found in Sierra Leone, Liberia, Ivory Coast, Ghana and Togo. The habitat consists of forests.
