= Mylothris aburi =

Scientific classification
- Kingdom: Animalia
- Phylum: Arthropoda
- Clade: Pancrustacea
- Class: Insecta
- Order: Lepidoptera
- Family: Pieridae
- Genus: Mylothris
- Species: M. aburi

Binomial name
- Mylothris aburi Larsen & Collins, 2003

Species of butterfly

Mylothris aburi, the savanna dotted border, is a butterfly in the family Pieridae. It is found in eastern Senegal, Guinea, Ghana, Togo, and northern Nigeria. The habitat consists of the savanna-forest transition zone. It is also found in dry forests and light woodland.

It has been recorded amongst old Loranthus-infested citrus trees

Torben Larsen developed a species numbering system for his 2005 publication Butterflies of West Africa. The nominate subspecies is #103. The 'Larsen' numbers have since been used with permission in A Sharp Eye on Butterflies of Ghana.
