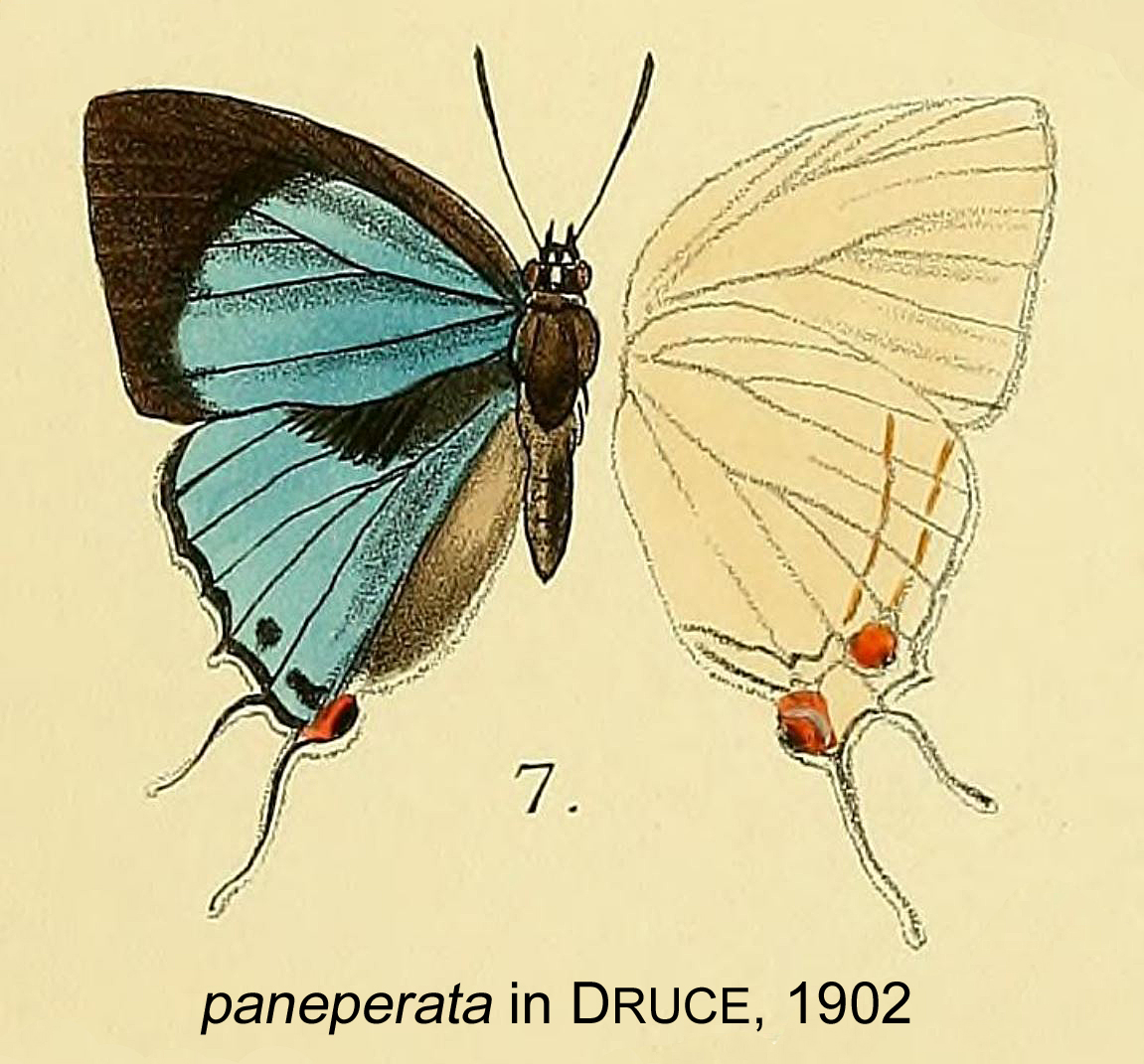

Conservation status
- Least Concern (IUCN 3.1)

Scientific classification
- Kingdom: Animalia
- Phylum: Arthropoda
- Class: Insecta
- Order: Lepidoptera
- Family: Lycaenidae
- Genus: Iolaus
- Species: I. paneperata

Binomial name
- Iolaus paneperata H. H. Druce, 1890

Synonyms
- Iolaus (Philiolaus) paneperata; Jolaus elisa Suffert, 1904

= Iolaus paneperata =

Species of butterfly

Iolaus paneperata, the parallel sapphire, is a butterfly in the family Lycaenidae. The species was first described by Hamilton Herbert Druce in 1890. It is found in Sierra Leone, Ivory Coast, Ghana, Togo, Nigeria (south and the Cross River loop), Cameroon, the Republic of the Congo and the Democratic Republic of the Congo (Kinshasa and possibly Kwango).

The larvae feed on the flowers of Loranthus incanus and Phragmanthera capitata. They are green and resemble the flowers on which they feed.
