= Neurellipes fulvimacula =

Medium red-spot ciliate blue

Scientific classification
- Kingdom: Animalia
- Phylum: Arthropoda
- Clade: Pancrustacea
- Class: Insecta
- Order: Lepidoptera
- Family: Lycaenidae
- Genus: Neurellipes
- Species: N. fulvimacula

Binomial name
- Neurellipes fulvimacula (Bethune-Baker, 1910)

Synonyms
- Neurellipes chryseostictus Bethune-Baker, 1910; Anthene (Neurellipes) chryseostictus

Species of butterfly

Neurellipes fulvimacula, formerly Anthene chryseostictus, the medium red-spot ciliate blue, is a butterfly in the family Lycaenidae. It is found in Guinea, Sierra Leone, Liberia, Ivory Coast, Ghana, Togo, Nigeria (south and the Cross River loop), Cameroon, the Republic of the Congo, the Democratic Republic of the Congo (Mongala, Uele and Lualaba), Uganda and north-western Tanzania. The habitat consists of forests.

Torben Larsen developed a species numbering system for his 2005 publication Butterflies of West Africa. This species is #534A. The 'Larsen' numbers have since been used with permission in A Sharp Eye on Butterflies of Ghana.
