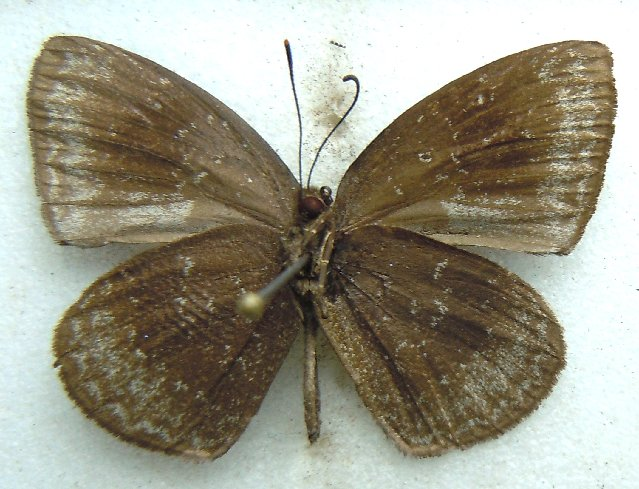

Scientific classification
- Domain: Eukaryota
- Kingdom: Animalia
- Phylum: Arthropoda
- Class: Insecta
- Order: Lepidoptera
- Family: Lycaenidae
- Genus: Stempfferia
- Species: S. kholifa

Binomial name
- Stempfferia kholifa (Bethune-Baker, 1904)

Synonyms
- Epitola kholifa Bethune-Baker, 1904; Stempfferia (Cercinia) kholifa

= Stempfferia kholifa =

Species of butterfly

Stempfferia kholifa, the kholifa epitola, is a butterfly in the family Lycaenidae. It is found in Sierra Leone, Liberia, Ivory Coast, Ghana, Togo and western Nigeria. The habitat consists of forests.
