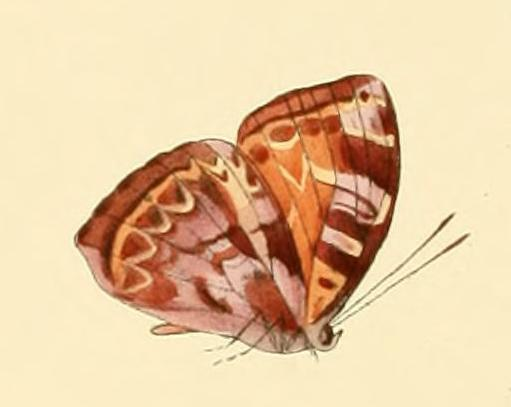

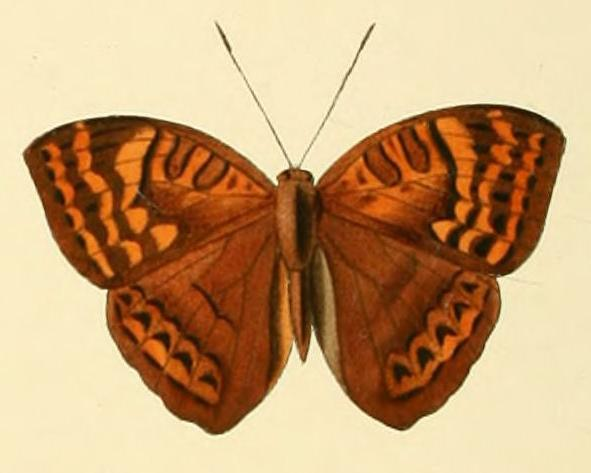

Scientific classification
- Kingdom: Animalia
- Phylum: Arthropoda
- Clade: Pancrustacea
- Class: Insecta
- Order: Lepidoptera
- Family: Nymphalidae
- Genus: Euriphene
- Species: E. ampedusa

Binomial name
- Euriphene ampedusa (Hewitson, 1866)

Synonyms
- Aterica ampedusa Hewitson, 1866; Euriphene (Euriphene) ampedusa

= Euriphene ampedusa =

Species of butterfly

Euriphene ampedusa, the common brown nymph, is a butterfly in the family Nymphalidae. It is found in Senegal, Guinea-Bissau, Guinea, Sierra Leone, Liberia, Ivory Coast, Ghana, Togo and Nigeria. The habitat consists of forests.

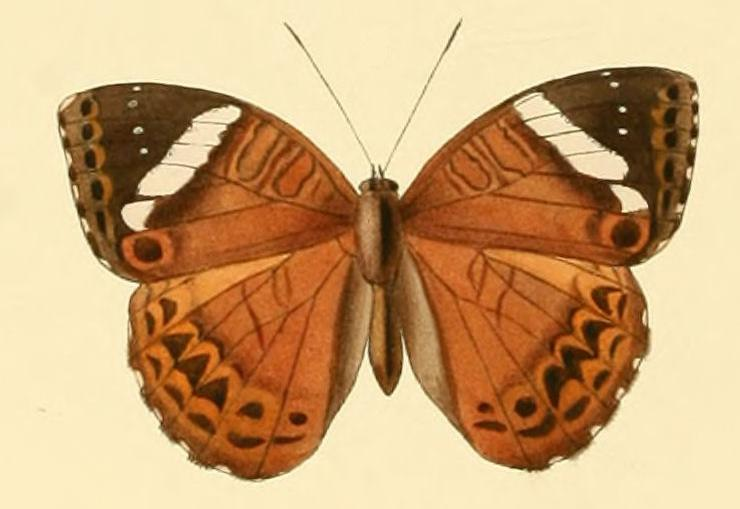

Torben Larsen developed a species numbering system for his 2005 publication Butterflies of West Africa. This species is #987. The 'Larsen' numbers have since been used with permission in A Sharp Eye on Butterflies of Ghana.
