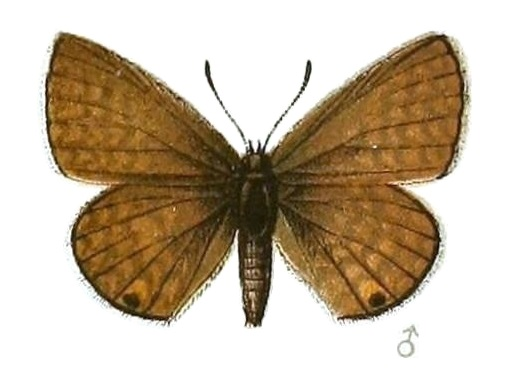

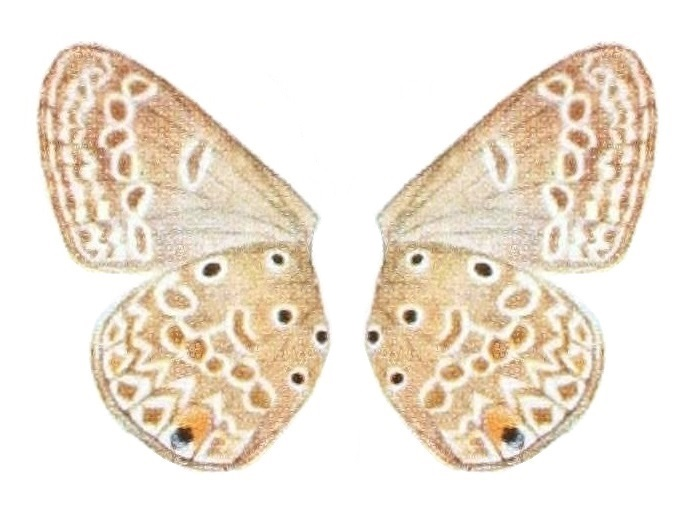
- male and wing undersides

Scientific classification
- Kingdom: Animalia
- Phylum: Arthropoda
- Class: Insecta
- Order: Lepidoptera
- Family: Lycaenidae
- Genus: Lepidochrysops
- Species: L. victoriae

Binomial name
- Lepidochrysops victoriae (Karsch, 1895)

Synonyms
- Lycaena victoriae Karsch, 1895; Cupido victoriae; Neochrysops victoriae; Catochrysops acholi Bethune-Baker, 1906

= Lepidochrysops victoriae =

Victoria blue

Species of butterfly

Lepidochrysops victoriae, the Victoria blue or Lake Victoria giant Cupid, is a butterfly in the family Lycaenidae.

== Range and habitat ==
It is found in Burkina Faso, Ghana, Togo, Benin, Nigeria, Cameroon, the DR Congo, South Sudan, Uganda and Kenya. The habitat consists of savanna.

== Subspecies ==
- Lepidochrysops victoriae victoriae — western Kenya
- Lepidochrysops victoriae occidentalis Libert & Collins, 2001 — Burkina Faso, northern Ghana, northern Togo, northern Benin, northern Nigeria, northern Cameroon, north-western Democratic Republic of the Congo, southern Sudan, Uganda
- Lepidochrysops victoriae vansomereni Stempffer, 1951 — Kenya: central part to the area east of the Rift Valley
