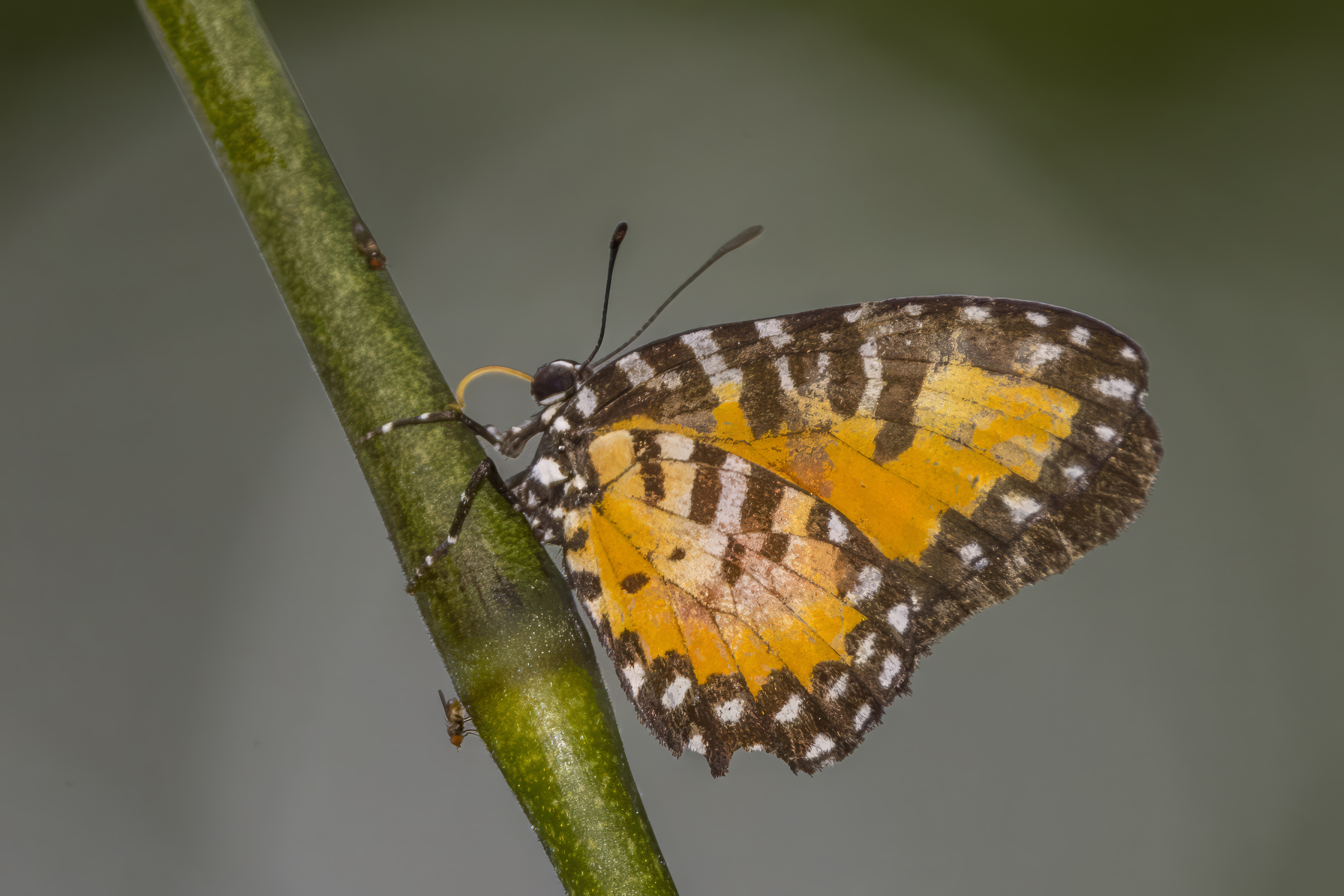
- Male T. s. semirufa in Ghana
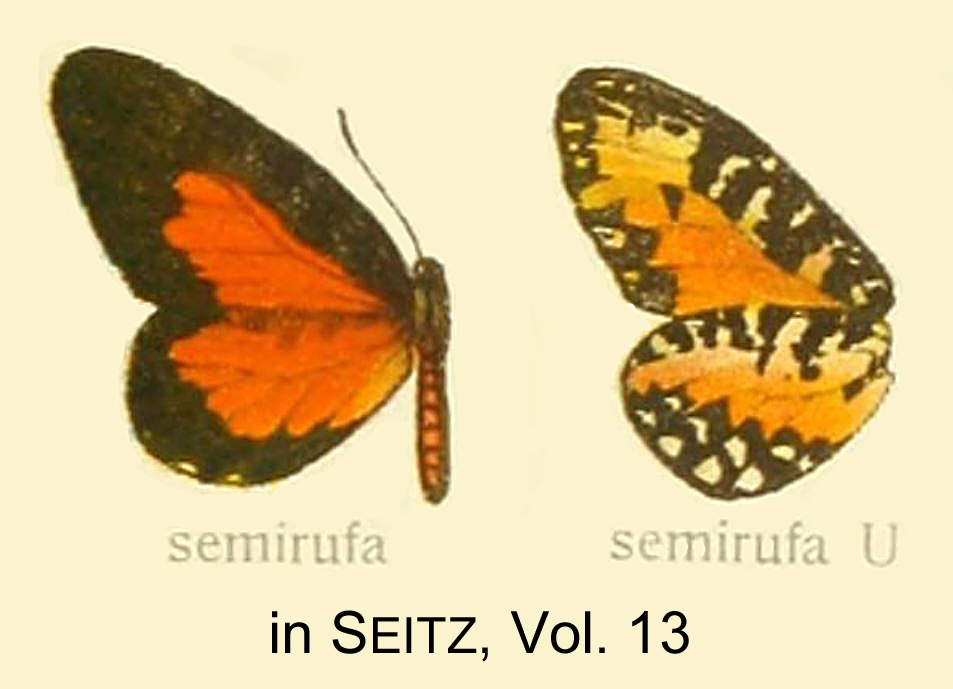

Scientific classification
- Kingdom: Animalia
- Phylum: Arthropoda
- Clade: Pancrustacea
- Class: Insecta
- Order: Lepidoptera
- Family: Lycaenidae
- Genus: Telipna
- Species: T. semirufa

Binomial name
- Telipna semirufa (Grose-Smith & Kirby, 1889)

Synonyms
- Liptena semirufa Grose-Smith & Kirby, 1889; Telipna maesseni Stempffer, 1970

= Telipna semirufa =

Species of butterfly

Telipna semirufa, the western telipna, is a butterfly in the family Lycaenidae. It is found in Guinea, Sierra Leone, Liberia, Ivory Coast, Ghana and Togo.

== Subspecies ==
- Telipna semirufa semirufa (Ivory Coast, Ghana, Togo)
- Telipna semirufa ivoiriensis Libert, 2005 (Guinea, Sierra Leone, Liberia, Ivory Coast)
- Telipna semirufa maesseni Stempffer, 1970

Torben Larsen developed a species numbering system for his 2005 publication Butterflies of West Africa. The nominate subspecies is #160 and the subspecies maesseni is #161. The 'Larsen' numbers have since been used with permission in A Sharp Eye on Butterflies of Ghana.
