= Anthene irumu =

Irumu ciliate blue

Scientific classification
- Domain: Eukaryota
- Kingdom: Animalia
- Phylum: Arthropoda
- Class: Insecta
- Order: Lepidoptera
- Family: Lycaenidae
- Genus: Anthene
- Species: A. irumu

Binomial name
- Anthene irumu (Stempffer, 1948)

Synonyms
- Cupidesthes irumu Stempffer, 1948; Anthene (Anthene) irumu

Species of butterfly

Anthene irumu, the Irumu ciliate blue, is a butterfly in the family Lycaenidae. It is found in Guinea, Sierra Leone, Ivory Coast, Ghana, Togo, Nigeria, Cameroon, the Republic of the Congo, the Central African Republic, the Democratic Republic of the Congo (Ituri, Uele and Sankuru), Uganda, north-western Tanzania, Zambia (the Copperbelt and the north-eastern part of the country) and Zimbabwe. The habitat consists of drier forests and open areas in the main forest zone, as well as Guinea savanna.

The larvae feed on Loranthus species.
