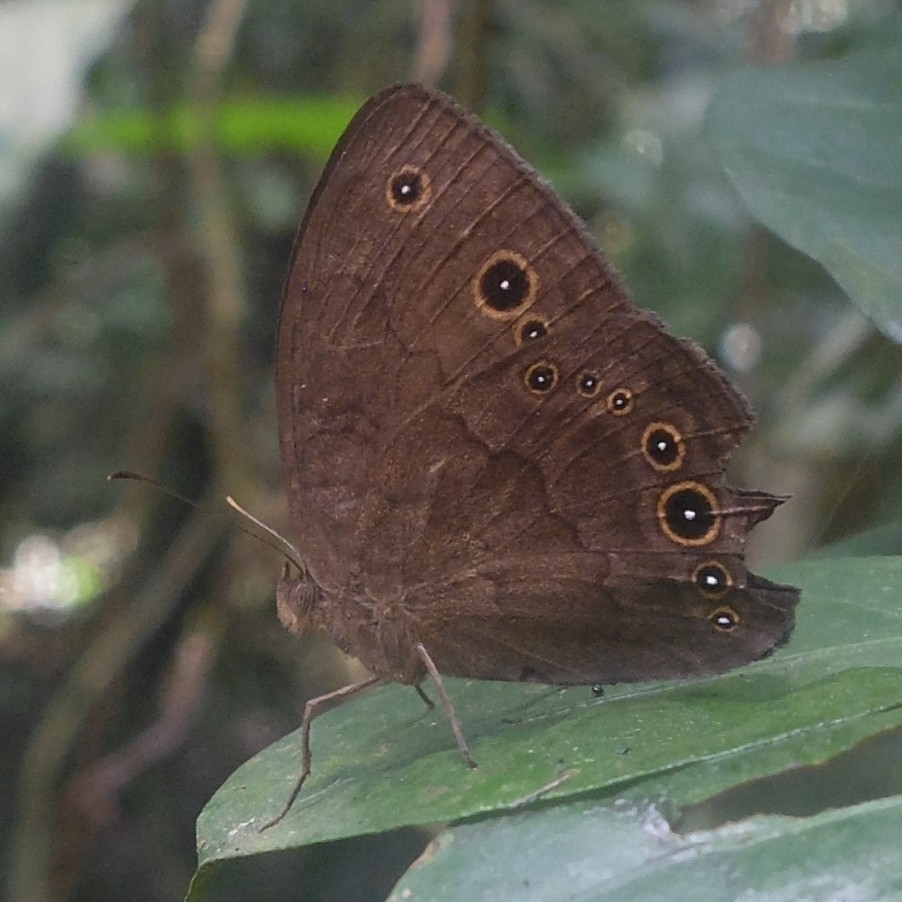

Scientific classification
- Kingdom: Animalia
- Phylum: Arthropoda
- Clade: Pancrustacea
- Class: Insecta
- Order: Lepidoptera
- Family: Nymphalidae
- Genus: Bicyclus
- Species: B. sangmelinae

Binomial name
- Bicyclus sangmelinae Condamin, 1963

= Bicyclus sangmelinae =

Condamin's bush brown

Species of butterfly

Bicyclus sangmelinae, or Condamin's bush brown, is a butterfly in the family Nymphalidae. It is found in Guinea, Sierra Leone, Liberia, Ivory Coast, Ghana, Nigeria, Cameroon and possibly the Central African Republic and Togo.The habitat consists of forests.

Torben Larsen developed a species numbering system for his 2005 publication Butterflies of West Africa. This species is #694. The 'Larsen' numbers have since been used with permission in A Sharp Eye on Butterflies of Ghana.
