= Cephetola collinsi =

Scientific classification
- Kingdom: Animalia
- Phylum: Arthropoda
- Clade: Pancrustacea
- Class: Insecta
- Order: Lepidoptera
- Family: Lycaenidae
- Genus: Cephetola
- Species: C. collinsi

Binomial name
- Cephetola collinsi Libert & Larsen, 1999

Species of butterfly

Cephetola collinsi, the Collins' epitola, is a butterfly in the family Lycaenidae. It is found in Ivory Coast, Ghana, Togo and southern Nigeria. Its habitat consists of forests.

Torben Larsen developed a species numbering system for his 2005 publication Butterflies of West Africa. This species is #307. The 'Larsen' numbers have since been used with permission in A Sharp Eye on Butterflies of Ghana.
