= Aslauga ernesti =

Scientific classification
- Kingdom: Animalia
- Phylum: Arthropoda
- Clade: Pancrustacea
- Class: Insecta
- Order: Lepidoptera
- Family: Lycaenidae
- Genus: Aslauga
- Species: A. ernesti

Binomial name
- Aslauga ernesti (Karsch, 1895)

Synonyms
- Epitola ernesti Karsch, 1895; Egumbia catori Bethune-Baker, 1924

Species of butterfly

Aslauga ernesti, the western egumbia, is a butterfly in the family Lycaenidae. It is found in Ghana (the Volta Region), Togo and western Nigeria.
