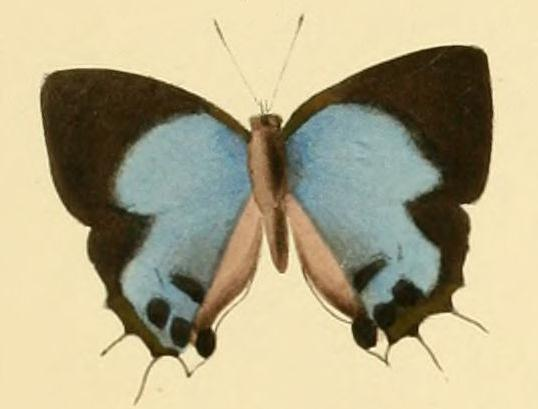

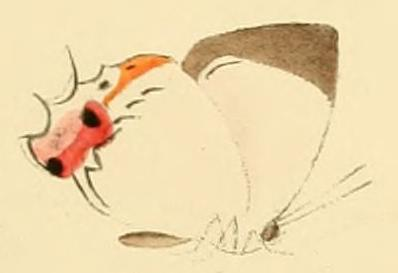

Scientific classification
- Kingdom: Animalia
- Phylum: Arthropoda
- Class: Insecta
- Order: Lepidoptera
- Family: Lycaenidae
- Genus: Iolaus
- Species: I. laon

Binomial name
- Iolaus laon Hewitson, 1878

Synonyms
- Jolaus adamsi Lathy, 1903; Jolaus emma Suffert, 1904

= Iolaus laon =

Species of butterfly

Iolaus laon, the fine sapphire, is a butterfly in the family Lycaenidae. It is found in eastern Ivory Coast, Ghana, Togo and western Nigeria. The habitat consists of forests and disturbed areas such as cocoa plantations.

The larvae feed on the flowers of Loranthus incanus. They are mole coloured.
