= Liptena rochei =

Scientific classification
- Kingdom: Animalia
- Phylum: Arthropoda
- Class: Insecta
- Order: Lepidoptera
- Family: Lycaenidae
- Genus: Liptena
- Species: L. rochei

Binomial name
- Liptena rochei Stempffer, 1951

Species of butterfly

Liptena rochei, the Roche's liptena, is a butterfly in the family Lycaenidae. It is found in Sierra Leone, Liberia, Ivory Coast, Ghana, Togo and western Nigeria. The habitat consists of the fringes of good quality forests.
