= Bicyclus sylvicolus =

White-tipped bush brown

Scientific classification
- Kingdom: Animalia
- Phylum: Arthropoda
- Clade: Pancrustacea
- Class: Insecta
- Order: Lepidoptera
- Family: Nymphalidae
- Genus: Bicyclus
- Species: B. sylvicolus

Binomial name
- Bicyclus sylvicolus Condamin, 1965

Synonyms
- Bicyclus abnormis f. sylvicolus Condamin, 1961

Species of butterfly

Bicyclus sylvicolus, the white-tipped bush brown, is a butterfly in the family Nymphalidae. It is found in Ghana (the Volta Region), Togo, Nigeria and western Cameroon. The habitat consists of forests.
