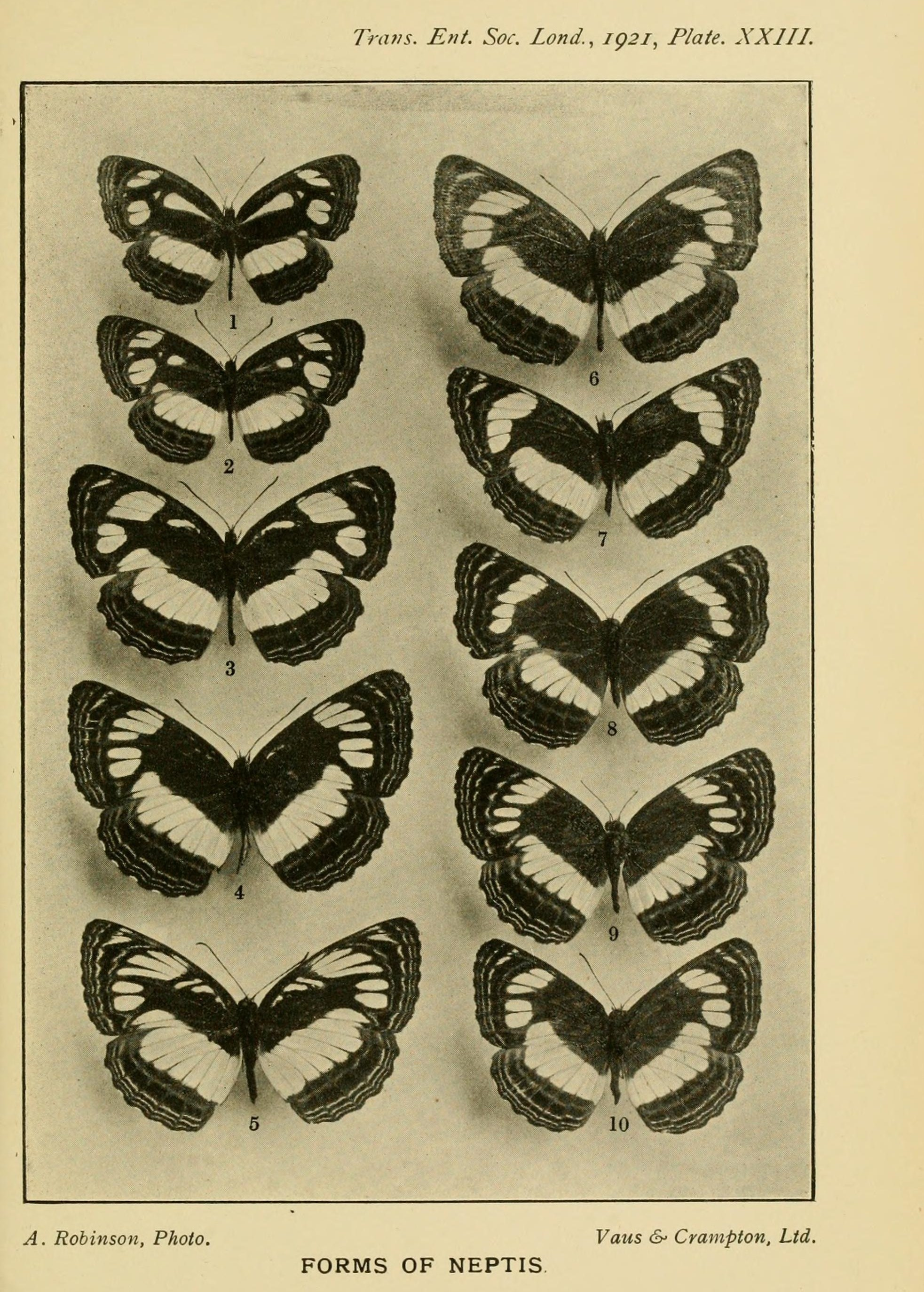
- Figure 7

Scientific classification
- Kingdom: Animalia
- Phylum: Arthropoda
- Class: Insecta
- Order: Lepidoptera
- Family: Nymphalidae
- Genus: Neptis
- Species: N. conspicua

Binomial name
- Neptis conspicua Neave, 1904

= Neptis conspicua =

Species of butterfly

Neptis conspicua, or Neave's sailer, is a butterfly in the family Nymphalidae. It is found in Cameroon, the Democratic Republic of the Congo, Uganda, western Kenya, north-western Tanzania, Zambia and possibly Sierra Leone, Togo and Nigeria. The habitat consists of forests. It is a member of the Neptis agatha species group. The forms of this group may be at once recognized by the underside of the hindwing having 2 or 3 continuous white transverse bands at the base (cf. agatha underside, 48 d) and by the cell having white dots or being only striped with white at the anterior margin. Some of the numerous forms are very nearly allied continuata Holl. (= conspicua Neave) only differs in having the discal band of the forewing continuous between vein 2 and the costal margin and the median band of the hindwing almost smooth distally, not incised at the veins. [form from Togoto, Angola and Uganda]].

- Images BOLD
