= Iolaus theodori =

Scientific classification
- Kingdom: Animalia
- Phylum: Arthropoda
- Class: Insecta
- Order: Lepidoptera
- Family: Lycaenidae
- Genus: Iolaus
- Species: I. theodori

Binomial name
- Iolaus theodori Stempffer, 1970

Synonyms
- Iolaus (Philiolaus) theodori

Species of butterfly

Iolaus theodori, the Maessen's sapphire, is a butterfly in the family Lycaenidae. It is found in Ghana (the Volta Region) and Togo.

The larvae feed on Phragmanthera nigritana.
