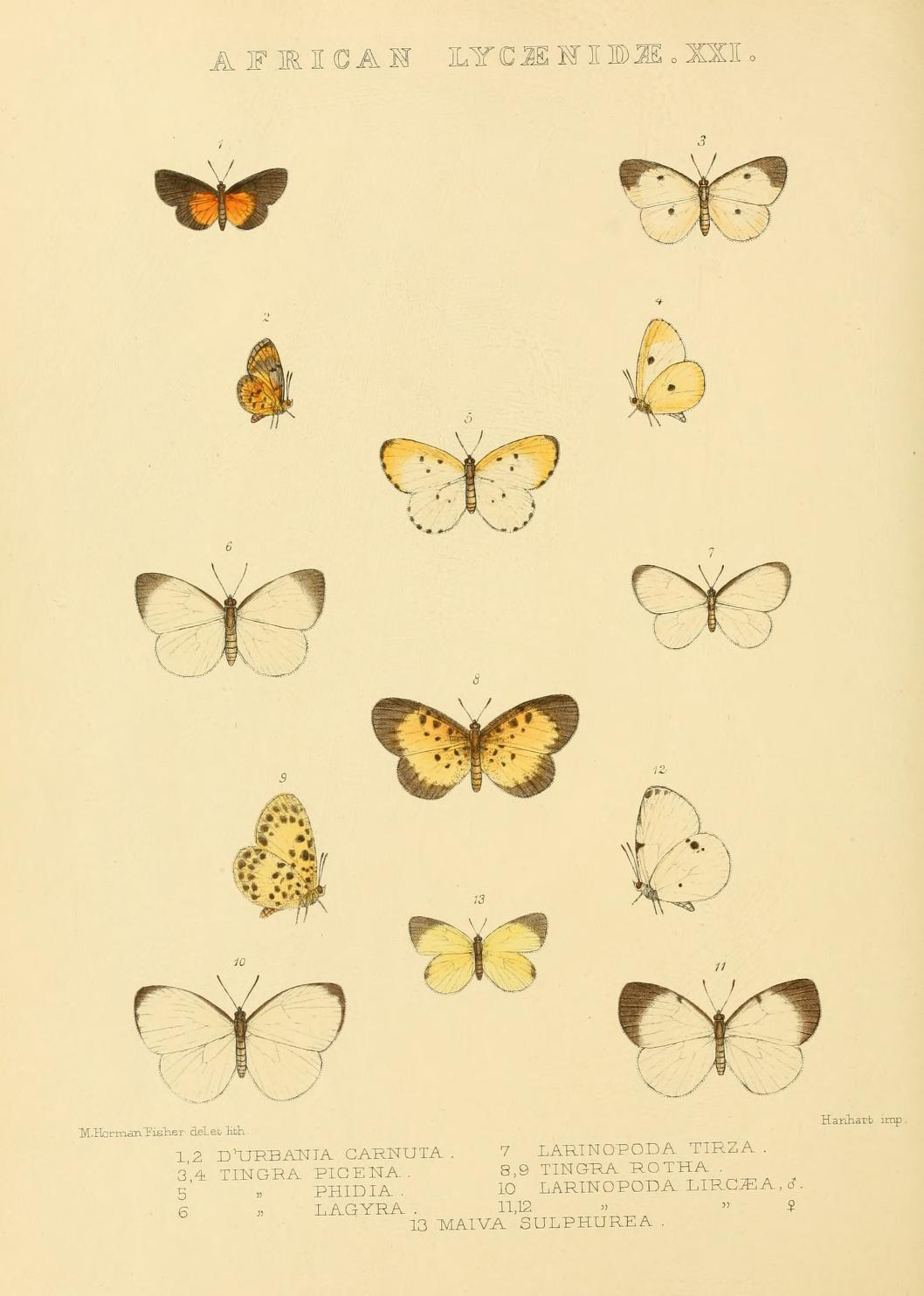
- Figure 5

Scientific classification
- Kingdom: Animalia
- Phylum: Arthropoda
- Clade: Pancrustacea
- Class: Insecta
- Order: Lepidoptera
- Family: Lycaenidae
- Genus: Pentila
- Species: P. phidia

Binomial name
- Pentila phidia Hewitson, 1874

Synonyms
- Tingra nunu Karsch, 1893

= Pentila phidia =

Species of butterfly

Pentila phidia, the Ghana pentila, is a butterfly in the family Lycaenidae. It is found in central and eastern Ivory Coast, Ghana and Togo. The habitat consists of forests.
