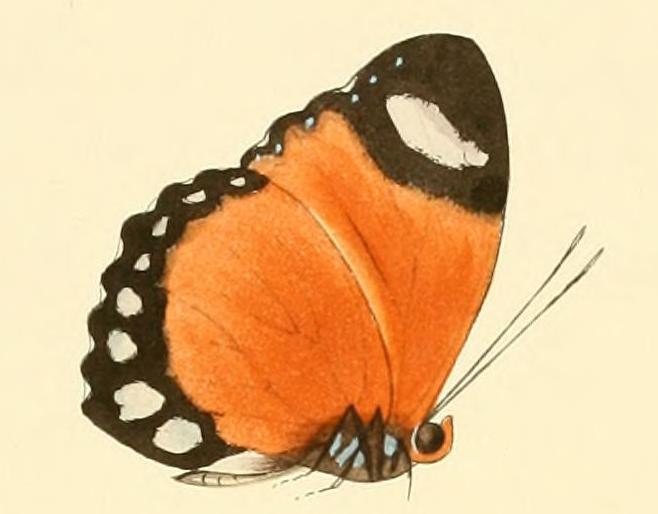

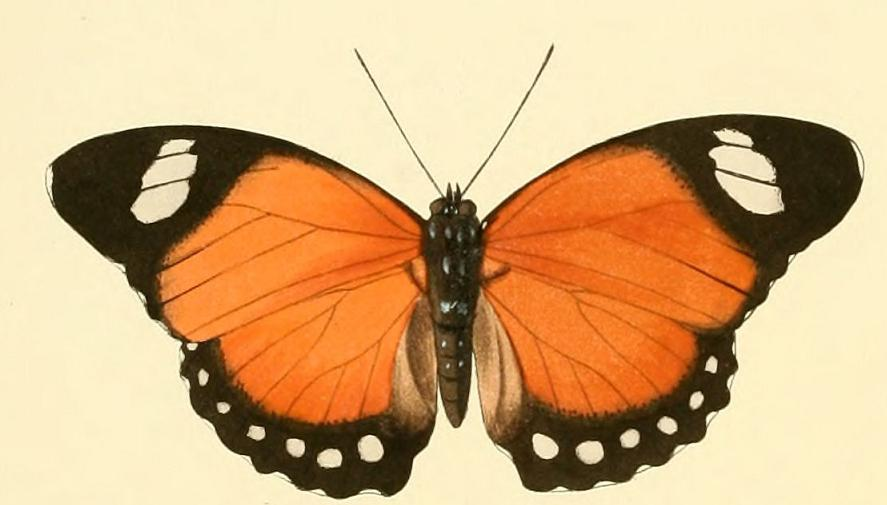

Scientific classification
- Kingdom: Animalia
- Phylum: Arthropoda
- Clade: Pancrustacea
- Class: Insecta
- Order: Lepidoptera
- Family: Nymphalidae
- Genus: Euphaedra
- Species: E. ruspina

Binomial name
- Euphaedra ruspina (Hewitson, 1865)

Synonyms
- Romalaeosoma ruspina Hewitson, 1865; Euphaedra (Euphaedrana) ruspina

= Euphaedra ruspina =

Species of butterfly

Euphaedra ruspina, or the common orange forester, is a butterfly in the family Nymphalidae. It is found in Ghana (the Volta Region), Togo, southern Nigeria, Cameroon, Gabon, the Republic of the Congo, the Central African Republic, Angola, the Democratic Republic of the Congo, western Uganda, north-western Tanzania and Zambia. The habitat consists of forests.

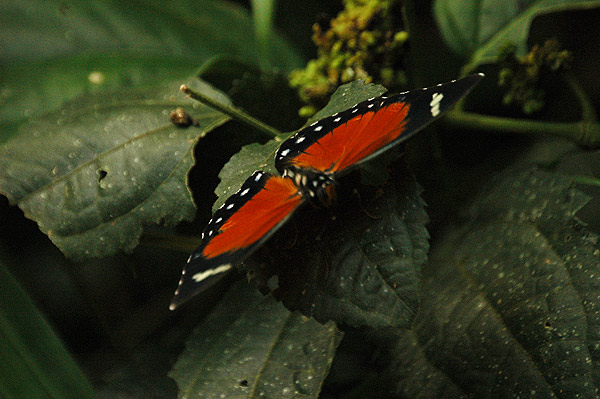

== Description ==
E. ruspina Hew. (42 b, as eleus has almost the colour and markings of eleus, but the shape of the wings is different, the forewing being shorter and more obtuse, with the distal margin weakly excised, and the hindwing distinctly but shortly produced at the anal angle. On the underside of the hindwing the white costal stripe is entirely absent. The red-yellow ground-colour is alike on both surfaces; the black apical part of the forewing and the marginal band of the hindwing are as sharply defined beneath as above; the marginal band of the forewing is much narrower between the hinder angle and vein 3 than in eleus; the subapical band of the forewing is white, sometimes narrow, sometimes broad and rounded; the breast with 2 very large white lateral spots at each side. The species bears a great external (mimetic ?) resemblance to some Geometrids, such as Aletis helcita L., and some Agaristids, as Weymeria athene Weym. and Tuerta ruspina Auriv

Torben Larsen developed a species numbering system for his 2005 publication Butterflies of West Africa. This species is #1116. The 'Larsen' numbers have since been used with permission in A Sharp Eye on Butterflies of Ghana.

== Biology ==
Adults mimic day-flying moths, including Aletis helcita, Phaegorista similis, Heraclia poggei, Weymeria athenae and Oethrodea papilionaris.

== Similar species ==
Other members of the Euphaedra eleus species group q.v.
