= List of butterflies of Equatorial Guinea =

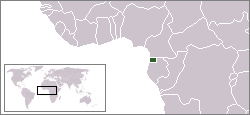
Location of Equatorial Guinea

This is a list of butterflies of Equatorial Guinea. About 269 species or subspecies are known from Equatorial Guinea, 10 of which are endemic.

== Papilionidae ==
=== Papilioninae ===
==== Papilionini ====
- Papilio nireus Linnaeus, 1758
- Papilio charopus Westwood, 1843
- Papilio cynorta Fabricius, 1793
- Papilio dardanus Brown, 1776
- Papilio phorcas bardamu Canu, 1994
- Papilio phorcas congoanus Rothschild, 1896
- Papilio zenobia Fabricius, 1775
- Papilio fernandus Fruhstorfer, 1903
- Papilio filaprae musolanus (Hancock, 1988)
- Papilio hesperus hesperus Westwood, 1843
- Papilio hesperus feae Storace, 1963
- Papilio menestheus canui Gauthier, 1984

==== Leptocercini ====
- Graphium antheus (Cramer, 1779)
- Graphium policenes (Cramer, 1775)
- Graphium biokoensis (Gauthier, 1984)
- Graphium colonna (Ward, 1873)
- Graphium illyris flavisparsus (Fruhstorfer, 1903)
- Graphium illyris hamatus (Joicey & Talbot, 1918)
- Graphium ridleyanus (White, 1843)
- Graphium leonidas (Fabricius, 1793)
- Graphium tynderaeus (Fabricius, 1793)
- Graphium latreillianus theorini (Aurivillius, 1881)
- Graphium auriger (Butler, 1876)
- Graphium fulleri boulleti (Le Cerf, 1912)
- Graphium ucalegon (Hewitson, 1865)

== Pieridae ==
=== Pseudopontiinae ===
- Pseudopontia paradoxa (Felder & Felder, 1869)

=== Coliadinae ===
- Eurema brigitta (Stoll, [1780])
- Eurema hecabe solifera (Butler, 1875)
- Eurema senegalensis (Boisduval, 1836)
- Catopsilia florella (Fabricius, 1775)

=== Pierinae ===
- Colotis celimene sudanicus (Aurivillius, 1905)
- Nepheronia argia (Fabricius, 1775)
- Nepheronia pharis (Boisduval, 1836)
- Leptosia alcesta (Stoll, [1782])
- Leptosia hybrida Bernardi, 1952

==== Pierini ====
- Appias epaphia (Cramer, [1779])
- Appias phaola (Doubleday, 1847)
- Appias sabina (Felder & Felder, [1865])
- Appias sylvia (Fabricius, 1775)
- Mylothris alcuana Grünberg, 1910
- Mylothris basalis Aurivillius, 1906
- Mylothris chloris (Fabricius, 1775)
- Mylothris hilara furvus Bernardi, 1953
- Mylothris hilara goma Berger, 1981
- Mylothris jacksoni cederici Collins, 1997
- Mylothris rembina (Plötz, 1880)
- Mylothris rhodope (Fabricius, 1775)
- Belenois aurota (Fabricius, 1793)
- Belenois theuszi (Dewitz, 1889)

== Lycaenidae ==
=== Miletinae ===
==== Liphyrini ====
- Aslauga vininga (Hewitson, 1875)

==== Miletini ====
- Megalopalpus angulosus Grünberg, 1910
- Megalopalpus zymna (Westwood, 1851)
- Lachnocnema reutlingeri Holland, 1892

=== Poritiinae ===
==== Liptenini ====
- Pentila maculata pardalena Druce, 1910
- Pentila bitje Druce, 1910
- Pentila cloetensi aspasia Grünberg, 1910
- Pentila occidentalium gabunica Stempffer & Bennett, 1961
- Telipna albofasciata Aurivillius, 1910
- Telipna atrinervis Hulstaert, 1924
- Telipna hollandi exsuperia Hulstaert, 1924
- Telipna sanguinea (Plötz, 1880)
- Ornipholidotos kirbyi (Aurivillius. 1895)
- Ornipholidotos ugandae biokoensis Libert, 2005
- Ornipholidotos tessmani Libert, 2005
- Ornipholidotos ayissii Libert, 2005
- Ornipholidotos annae Libert, 2005
- Ornipholidotos evoei Libert, 2005
- Ornipholidotos nbeti Libert, 2005
- Ornipholidotos perfragilis (Holland, 1890)
- Torbenia aurivilliusi (Stempffer, 1967)
- Mimeresia favillacea (Grünberg, 1910)
- Mimeresia libentina (Hewitson, 1866)
- Mimeresia moreelsi tessmanni (Grünberg, 1910)
- Liptena bolivari Kheil, 1905
- Liptena evanescens (Kirby, 1887)
- Liptena fatima (Kirby, 1890)
- Liptena intermedia Grünberg, 1910
- Liptena opaca (Kirby, 1890)
- Liptena subundularis (Staudinger, 1892)
- Liptena xanthostola (Holland, 1890)
- Tetrarhanis laminifer Clench, 1965
- Falcuna hollandi suffusa Stempffer & Bennett, 1963
- Falcuna libyssa cameroonica Stempffer & Bennett, 1963
- Falcuna synesia gabonensis Stempffer & Bennett, 1963
- Larinopoda lircaea (Hewitson, 1866)
- Larinopoda tera (Hewitson, 1873)
- Micropentila brunnea (Kirby, 1887)
- Pseuderesia eleaza (Hewitson, 1873)
- Eresina rougeoti Stempffer, 1956
- Eresiomera isca (Hewitson, 1873)
- Eresiomera phaeochiton (Grünberg, 1910)
- Eresiomera rougeoti (Stempffer, 1961)
- Citrinophila erastus (Hewitson, 1866)

==== Epitolini ====
- Geritola larae Collins & Libert, 1999
- Stempfferia gordoni (Druce, 1903)
- Cephetola subcoerulea (Roche, 1954)
- Epitolina dispar (Kirby, 1887)
- Epitolina melissa (Druce, 1888)
- Hypophytala hyettoides (Aurivillius, 1895)
- Hypophytala obscura (Schultze, 1916)

=== Theclinae ===
- Hypolycaena clenchi Larsen, 1997
- Hypolycaena liara Druce, 1890
- Iolaus eurisus vexillarius Clench, 1964
- Iolaus aethria Karsch, 1893
- Iolaus cytaeis Hewitson, 1875
- Iolaus frater kumboae (Bethune-Baker, 1926)
- Iolaus hemicyanus barbara Suffert, 1904
- Iolaus alcibiades Kirby, 1871
- Pilodeudorix catalla (Karsch, 1895)
- Paradeudorix cobaltina (Stempffer, 1964)
- Paradeudorix eleala (Hewitson, 1865)
- Paradeudorix ituri (Bethune-Baker, 1908)
- Deudorix caliginosa Lathy, 1903
- Deudorix lorisona (Hewitson, 1862)

=== Polyommatinae ===
==== Lycaenesthini ====
- Anthene mahota (Grose-Smith, 1887)
- Anthene scintillula (Holland, 1891)
- Cupidesthes thyrsis (Kirby, 1878)

==== Polyommatini ====
- Pseudonacaduba aethiops (Mabille, 1877)
- Oboronia ornata flava Holland, 1920
- Oboronia pseudopunctatus (Strand, 1912)

== Nymphalidae ==
=== Libytheinae ===
- Libythea labdaca Westwood, 1851

=== Danainae ===
==== Danaini ====
- Danaus chrysippus alcippus (Cramer, 1777)
- Tirumala formosa morgeni (Honrath, 1892)
- Amauris niavius (Linnaeus, 1758)
- Amauris tartarea Mabille, 1876
- Amauris echeria fernandina Schultze, 1914
- Amauris hyalites Butler, 1874
- Amauris inferna moka Talbot, 1940
- Amauris vashti (Butler, 1869)

=== Satyrinae ===
==== Melanitini ====
- Gnophodes betsimena parmeno Doubleday, 1849
- Melanitis leda (Linnaeus, 1758)

==== Satyrini ====
- Bicyclus buea (Strand, 1912)
- Bicyclus dorothea dorothea (Cramer, 1779)
- Bicyclus dorothea concolor Condamin & Fox, 1964
- Bicyclus feae (Aurivillius, 1910)
- Bicyclus hewitsoni (Doumet, 1861)
- Bicyclus howarthi Condamin, 1963
- Bicyclus italus (Hewitson, 1865)
- Bicyclus medontias (Hewitson, 1873)
- Bicyclus martius sanaos (Hewitson, 1866)
- Bicyclus sandace (Hewitson, 1877)
- Bicyclus smithi fernandina (Schultze, 1914)
- Bicyclus sealeae Collins & Larsen, 2008
- Bicyclus xeneas (Hewitson, 1866)
- Bicyclus xeneoides Condamin, 1961

=== Charaxinae ===
==== Charaxini ====
- Charaxes varanes vologeses (Mabille, 1876)
- Charaxes fulvescens marialuisae Canu, 1989
- Charaxes protoclea cedrici Canu, 1989
- Charaxes boueti Feisthamel, 1850
- Charaxes castor (Cramer, 1775)
- Charaxes brutus angustus Rothschild, 1900
- Charaxes pollux annamariae Turlin, 1998
- Charaxes eudoxus biokoensis Canu, 1989
- Charaxes numenes malabo Turlin, 1998
- Charaxes tiridates choveti Turlin, 1998
- Charaxes imperialis nathaliae Canu, 1989
- Charaxes cedreatis Hewitson, 1874
- Charaxes lycurgus bernardiana Plantrou, 1978
- Charaxes doubledayi Aurivillius, 1899
- Charaxes mycerina nausicaa Staudinger, 1891

==== Euxanthini ====
- Charaxes eurinome (Cramer, 1775)
- Charaxes trajanus (Ward, 1871)

=== Nymphalinae ===
- Kallimoides rumia jadyae (Fox, 1968)

==== Nymphalini ====
- Antanartia delius guineensis Howarth, 1966
- Vanessa dimorphica mortoni (Howarth, 1966)
- Junonia cymodoce lugens (Schultze, 1912)
- Salamis cacta (Fabricius, 1793)
- Protogoniomorpha parhassus (Drury, 1782)
- Hypolimnas anthedon (Doubleday, 1845)
- Hypolimnas misippus (Linnaeus, 1764)
- Hypolimnas salmacis insularis Schultze, 1920

=== Cyrestinae ===
==== Cyrestini ====
- Cyrestis camillus (Fabricius, 1781)

=== Biblidinae ===
==== Biblidini ====
- Neptidopsis ophione (Cramer, 1777)
- Eurytela alinda Mabille, 1893

==== Epicaliini ====
- Sevenia boisduvali omissa (Rothschild, 1918)

=== Limenitinae ===
==== Limenitidini ====
- Cymothoe capella (Ward, 1871)
- Cymothoe fumana balluca Fox & Howarth, 1968
- Cymothoe herminia (Grose-Smith, 1887)
- Cymothoe indamora canui Beaurain, 1985
- Cymothoe jodutta ciceronis (Ward, 1871)
- Cymothoe lucasii (Doumet, 1859)
- Cymothoe lurida sublurida Fruhstorfer, 1903
- Cymothoe oemilius fernandina Hall, 1929
- Cymothoe owassae Schultze, 1916

==== Neptidini ====
- Neptis mixophyes Holland, 1892
- Neptis nemetes margueriteae Fox, 1968

==== Adoliadini ====
- Catuna crithea (Drury, 1773)
- Euriphene atossa angusta Hecq, 1994
- Euriphene canui Hecq, 1987
- Euriphene incerta biokensis Hecq, 1994
- Euriphene mundula (Grünberg, 1910)
- Euriphene tadema (Hewitson, 1866)
- Euriphene lysandra (Stoll, 1790)
- Bebearia zonara (Butler, 1871)
- Bebearia barce maculata (Aurivillius, 1912)
- Bebearia comus (Ward, 1871)
- Bebearia paludicola Holmes, 2001
- Bebearia staudingeri (Aurivillius, 1893)
- Bebearia flaminia (Staudinger, 1891)
- Bebearia tessmanni (Grünberg, 1910)
- Bebearia cinaethon (Hewitson, 1874)
- Bebearia oremansi Hecq, 1994
- Euphaedra medon fernanda Hecq, 1981
- Euphaedra extensa Hecq, 1981
- Euphaedra hewitsoni disclara Hecq, 1991
- Euphaedra brevis Hecq, 1977
- Euphaedra alava Hecq, 2000
- Euphaedra canui Hecq, 1987
- Euphaedra janetta insularis Schultze, 1920
- Euphaedra splendens Hecq, 1992
- Euphaedra harpalyce vana Hecq, 1991
- Euphaedra losinga wardi (Druce, 1874)
- Euphaedra temeraria Hecq, 2007
- Euphaedra vulnerata Schultze, 1916
- Euptera elabontas canui Collins, 1995

=== Heliconiinae ===
==== Acraeini ====
- Acraea kraka Aurivillius, 1893
- Acraea admatha Hewitson, 1865
- Acraea camaena (Drury, 1773)
- Acraea eugenia ochreata Grünberg, 1910
- Acraea neobule Doubleday, 1847
- Acraea annobona d'Abrera, 1980
- Acraea abdera Hewitson, 1852
- Acraea egina (Cramer, 1775)
- Acraea alcinoe camerunica (Aurivillius, 1893)
- Acraea epaea insulana Ackery, 1995
- Acraea excisa (Butler, 1874)
- Acraea macarista latefasciata (Suffert, 1904)
- Acraea tellus (Aurivillius, 1893)
- Acraea alciope Hewitson, 1852
- Acraea bonasia (Fabricius, 1775)
- Acraea circeis (Drury, 1782)
- Acraea serena (Fabricius, 1775)
- Acraea jodutta (Fabricius, 1793)
- Acraea lycoa Godart, 1819
- Acraea oberthueri Butler, 1895
- Acraea orestia Hewitson, 1874
- Acraea peneleos Ward, 1871
- Acraea pharsalus pharsalus Ward, 1871
- Acraea pharsalus carmen Pyrcz, 1991
- Acraea orina Hewitson, 1874
- Acraea parrhasia limonata Eltringham, 1912

==== Vagrantini ====
- Lachnoptera anticlia (Hübner, 1819)
- Phalanta eurytis (Doubleday, 1847)
- Phalanta phalantha aethiopica (Rothschild & Jordan, 1903)

== Hesperiidae ==
=== Coeliadinae ===
- Coeliades chalybe (Westwood, 1852)
- Coeliades forestan (Stoll, [1782])
- Coeliades hanno (Plötz, 1879)
- Coeliades pisistratus (Fabricius, 1793)

=== Pyrginae ===
==== Celaenorrhinini ====
- Celaenorrhinus illustris (Mabille, 1891)
- Celaenorrhinus meditrina (Hewitson, 1877)
- Celaenorrhinus pooanus Aurivillius, 1910
- Celaenorrhinus rutilans (Mabille, 1877)

==== Tagiadini ====
- Tagiades flesus (Fabricius, 1781)

=== Hesperiinae ===
==== Aeromachini ====
- Gorgyra sara Evans, 1937
- Ceratrichia clara medea Evans, 1937
- Ceratrichia flava flava Hewitson, 1878
- Ceratrichia flava fernanda Evans, 1937
- Ceratrichia nothus makomensis Strand, 1913
- Ceratrichia phocion camerona Miller, 1971
- Pardaleodes bule Holland, 1896
- Pardaleodes edipus (Stoll, 1781)
- Xanthodisca astrape (Holland, 1892)
- Xanthodisca vibius (Hewitson, 1878)
- Osmodes lux Holland, 1892
- Caenides soritia (Hewitson, 1876)
- Caenides dacela (Hewitson, 1876)
- Caenides dacena (Hewitson, 1876)
- Melphina statirides (Holland, 1896)

==== Baorini ====
- Borbo fatuellus (Hopffer, 1855)

== See also ==
- Geography of Equatorial Guinea
- Atlantic Equatorial coastal forests
- Cross-Sanaga-Bioko coastal forests
- Mount Cameroon and Bioko montane forests
- São Tomé, Príncipe, and Annobón moist lowland forests
