= Geritola virginea =

Scientific classification
- Kingdom: Animalia
- Phylum: Arthropoda
- Clade: Pancrustacea
- Class: Insecta
- Order: Lepidoptera
- Family: Lycaenidae
- Genus: Geritola
- Species: G. virginea

Binomial name
- Geritola virginea (Bethune-Baker, 1904)

Synonyms
- Epitola virginea Bethune-Baker, 1904; Geritola (Geritola) virginea

Species of butterfly

Geritola virginea, the black-wing epitola, is a butterfly in the family Lycaenidae. It is found in Sierra Leone, Ivory Coast, Ghana, southern Nigeria, Cameroon and the Central African Republic. The habitat consists of forests.

Torben Larsen developed a species numbering system for his 2005 publication Butterflies of West Africa. This species is #320. The 'Larsen' numbers have since been used with permission in A Sharp Eye on Butterflies of Ghana.
