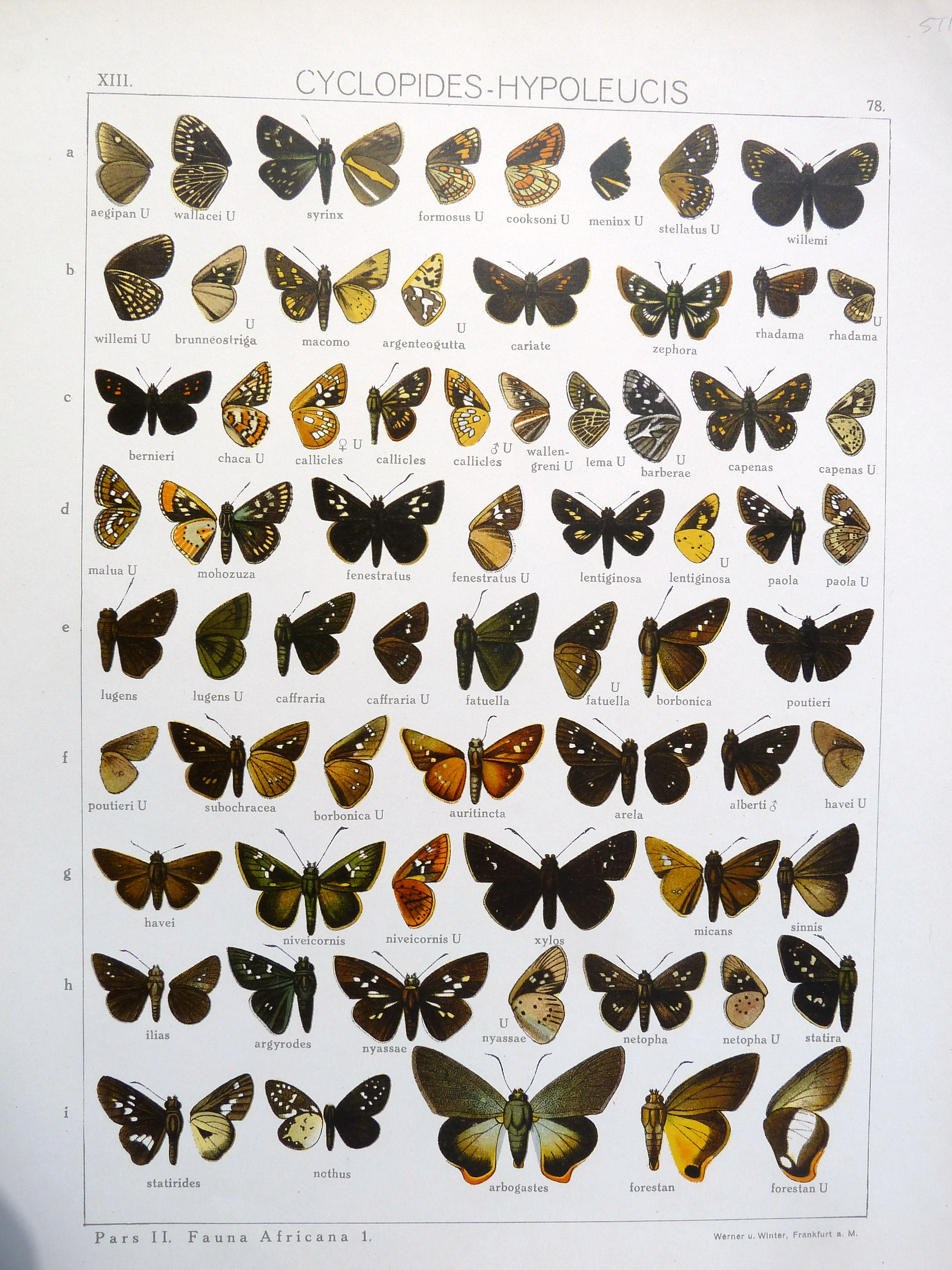

Scientific classification
- Kingdom: Animalia
- Phylum: Arthropoda
- Clade: Pancrustacea
- Class: Insecta
- Order: Lepidoptera
- Family: Hesperiidae
- Genus: Melphina
- Species: M. statira

Binomial name
- Melphina statira (Mabille, 1891)

Synonyms
- Pamphila statira Mabille, 1891; Parnara argyrodes Holland, 1894

= Melphina statira =

Species of butterfly

Melphina statira, the white-spotted forest swift, is a butterfly in the family Hesperiidae. It is found in Sierra Leone, Ivory Coast, Ghana, Nigeria and Gabon. The habitat consists of forests, including mature secondary forests.

Torben Larsen developed a species numbering system for his 2005 publication Butterflies of West Africa. This species is #1423. The 'Larsen' numbers have since been used with permission in A Sharp Eye on Butterflies of Ghana.
