= Melphina melphis =

Scientific classification
- Kingdom: Animalia
- Phylum: Arthropoda
- Clade: Pancrustacea
- Class: Insecta
- Order: Lepidoptera
- Family: Hesperiidae
- Genus: Melphina
- Species: M. melphis

Binomial name
- Melphina melphis (Holland, 1893)

Synonyms
- Parnara melphis Holland, 1893

Species of butterfly

Melphina melphis, the peculiar forest swift, is a butterfly in the family Hesperiidae. It is found in Sierra Leone, Ivory Coast, Nigeria, Cameroon, Gabon and possibly Ghana. The habitat consists of forests.

Torben Larsen developed a species numbering system for his 2005 publication Butterflies of West Africa. This species is #1418. The 'Larsen' numbers have since been used with permission in A Sharp Eye on Butterflies of Ghana.
