= Torbenia larseni =

Scientific classification
- Kingdom: Animalia
- Phylum: Arthropoda
- Class: Insecta
- Order: Lepidoptera
- Family: Lycaenidae
- Genus: Torbenia
- Species: T. larseni

Binomial name
- Torbenia larseni (Stempffer, 1969)

Synonyms
- Ornipholidotos larseni Stempffer, 1969

Species of butterfly

Torbenia larseni, the Larsen's glasswing, is a butterfly in the family Lycaenidae. It is found in southern Nigeria and western Cameroon. The habitat consists of forests. The species was named after Torben Bjørn Larsen.
