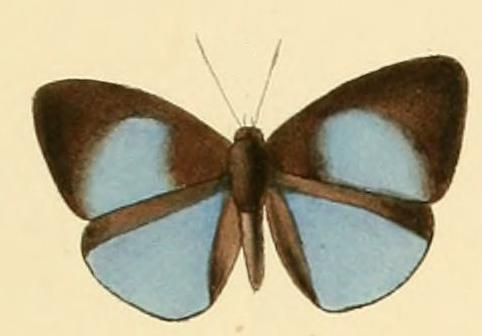

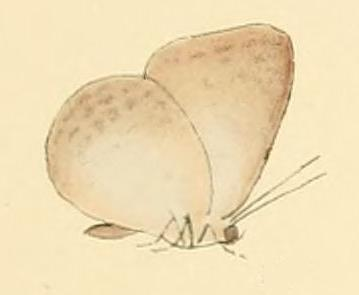

Scientific classification
- Domain: Eukaryota
- Kingdom: Animalia
- Phylum: Arthropoda
- Class: Insecta
- Order: Lepidoptera
- Family: Lycaenidae
- Genus: Geritola
- Species: G. gerina

Binomial name
- Geritola gerina (Hewitson, 1878)

Synonyms
- Epitola gerina Hewitson, 1878; Geritola (Geritola) gerina

= Geritola gerina =

Species of butterfly

Geritola gerina, the Gerina epitola, is a butterfly in the family Lycaenidae. It is found in Ivory Coast, Ghana, Togo, southern Nigeria, Cameroon, Gabon, the Republic of the Congo, the Central African Republic, the Democratic Republic of the Congo, Uganda and north-western Tanzania. The habitat consists of forests.
