= Torbenia =

Scientific classification
- Domain: Eukaryota
- Kingdom: Animalia
- Phylum: Arthropoda
- Class: Insecta
- Order: Lepidoptera
- Family: Lycaenidae
- Subfamily: Poritiinae
- Genus: Torbenia; Libert, 2000

Genus of butterflies

Torbenia is a genus of butterflies, commonly called Zulus, in the family Lycaenidae. They are endemic to the Afrotropical realm. The five species were formerly placed in Ornipholidotos. The genus is named after Torben Bjørn Larsen.

== Species ==
Listed alphabetically:

- Torbenia aurivilliusi (Stempffer, 1967)
- Torbenia larseni (Stempffer, 1969)
- Torbenia persimilis Libert, 2000
- Torbenia stempfferi Collins & Larsen, 2000
- Torbenia wojtusiaki Libert, 2000
