= Melphina flavina =

Scientific classification
- Kingdom: Animalia
- Phylum: Arthropoda
- Class: Insecta
- Order: Lepidoptera
- Family: Hesperiidae
- Genus: Melphina
- Species: M. flavina

Binomial name
- Melphina flavina Lindsey & Miller, 1965

Synonyms
- Melphina tarace f. flavina Evans, 1937

Species of butterfly

Melphina flavina, the yellow forest swift, is a butterfly in the family Hesperiidae. It is found in Sierra Leone, Ivory Coast, Ghana, Togo, Nigeria, Cameroon, the Democratic Republic of the Congo and Uganda. The habitat consists of forests.
