= Geritola jackiana =

Scientific classification
- Kingdom: Animalia
- Phylum: Arthropoda
- Class: Insecta
- Order: Lepidoptera
- Family: Lycaenidae
- Genus: Geritola
- Species: G. jackiana

Binomial name
- Geritola jackiana Collins & Libert, 1999

Synonyms
- Geritola (Geritola) jackiana

Species of butterfly

Geritola jackiana is a butterfly in the family Lycaenidae. It is found in Cameroon.
