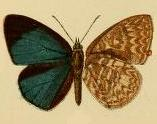

Scientific classification
- Domain: Eukaryota
- Kingdom: Animalia
- Phylum: Arthropoda
- Class: Insecta
- Order: Lepidoptera
- Family: Lycaenidae
- Genus: Geritola
- Species: G. albomaculata

Binomial name
- Geritola albomaculata (Bethune-Baker, 1903)

Synonyms
- Epitola albomaculata Bethune-Baker, 1903; Geritola (Geritola) albomaculata

= Geritola albomaculata =

Species of butterfly

Geritola albomaculata, the white-spotted epitola, is a butterfly in the family Lycaenidae. It is found in Sierra Leone, Ivory Coast and Cameroon.
