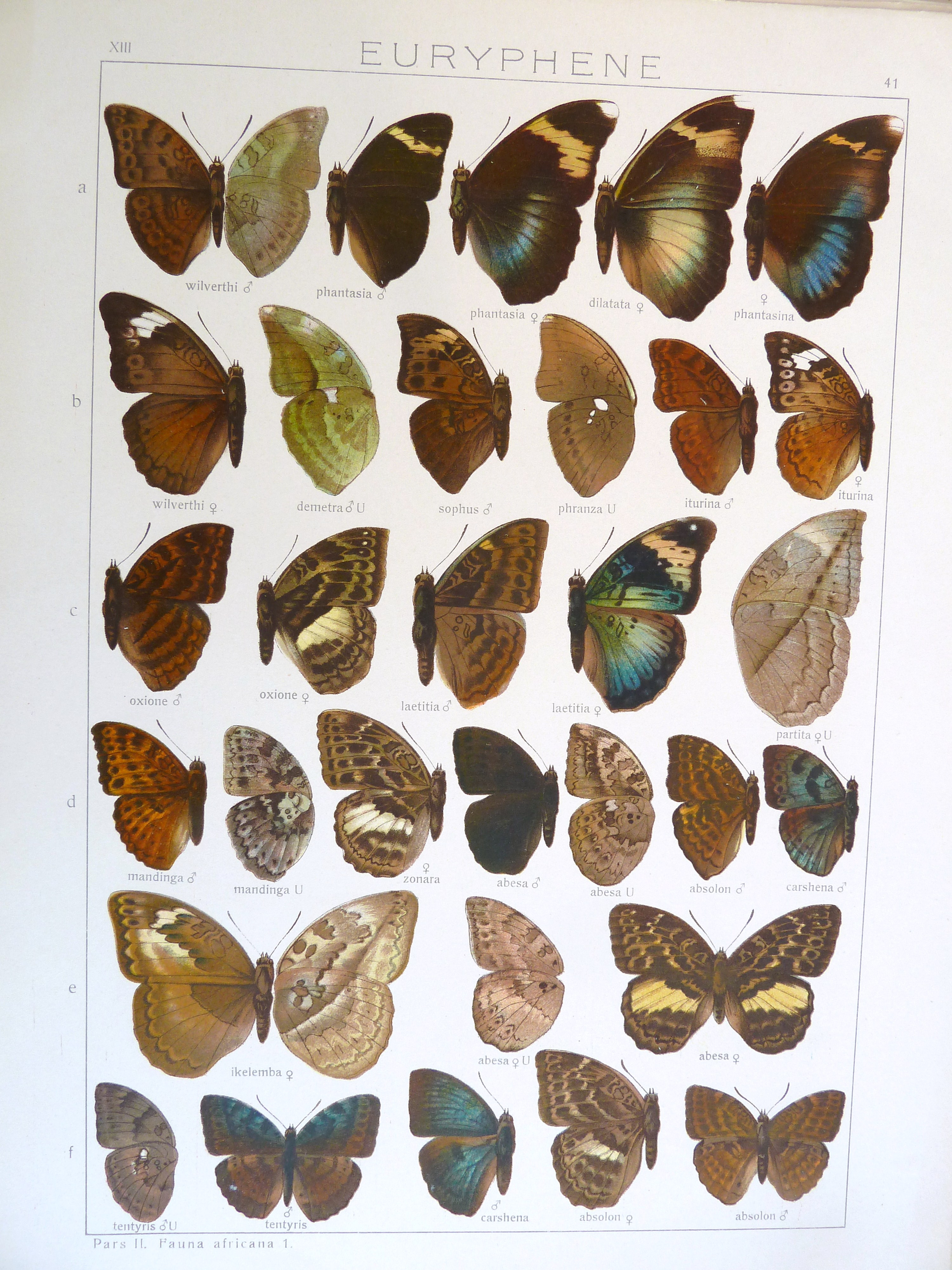
- In Adalbert Seitz's Fauna Africana

Scientific classification
- Kingdom: Animalia
- Phylum: Arthropoda
- Class: Insecta
- Order: Lepidoptera
- Family: Nymphalidae
- Genus: Bebearia
- Species: B. ikelemba

Binomial name
- Bebearia ikelemba (Aurivillius, 1901)

Synonyms
- Euryphene ikelemba Aurivillius, 1901

= Bebearia ikelemba =

Species of butterfly

Bebearia ikelemba is a butterfly in the family Nymphalidae. It is found in the Democratic Republic of the Congo.

E. ikelemba Auriv. (41 e). Only the female is known. This is very similar to the female of Bebearia cinaethon, but differs particularly in having the dark submarginal line of the forewing throughout strongly undulate or almost angled and above basally light-margined. The light yellow transverse band of the forewing is narrow from the costal margin to vein 4, becomes broader in cellule 3, then bends round towards the hindmargin and reaches vein 1, but in cellules 2 and 1 b is divided by a transverse shade into two branches; hindwing above with traces of three lighter transverse lines; the under surface scarcely different from that of cinaethon female.

== Subspecies ==
- Bebearia ikelemba ikelemba (Democratic Republic of the Congo: Equateur and Tshopo)
- Bebearia ikelemba kamituga Berger, 1981 (Democratic Republic of the Congo: southern Kivu)
