= Geritola liana =

Scientific classification
- Domain: Eukaryota
- Kingdom: Animalia
- Phylum: Arthropoda
- Class: Insecta
- Order: Lepidoptera
- Family: Lycaenidae
- Genus: Geritola
- Species: G. liana

Binomial name
- Geritola liana (Roche, 1954)

Synonyms
- Epitola liana Roche, 1954; Geritola (Geritola) liana

Species of butterfly

Geritola liana is a butterfly in the family Lycaenidae. It is found in Cameroon, the Central African Republic, the Democratic Republic of the Congo, Uganda and north-western Tanzania.
