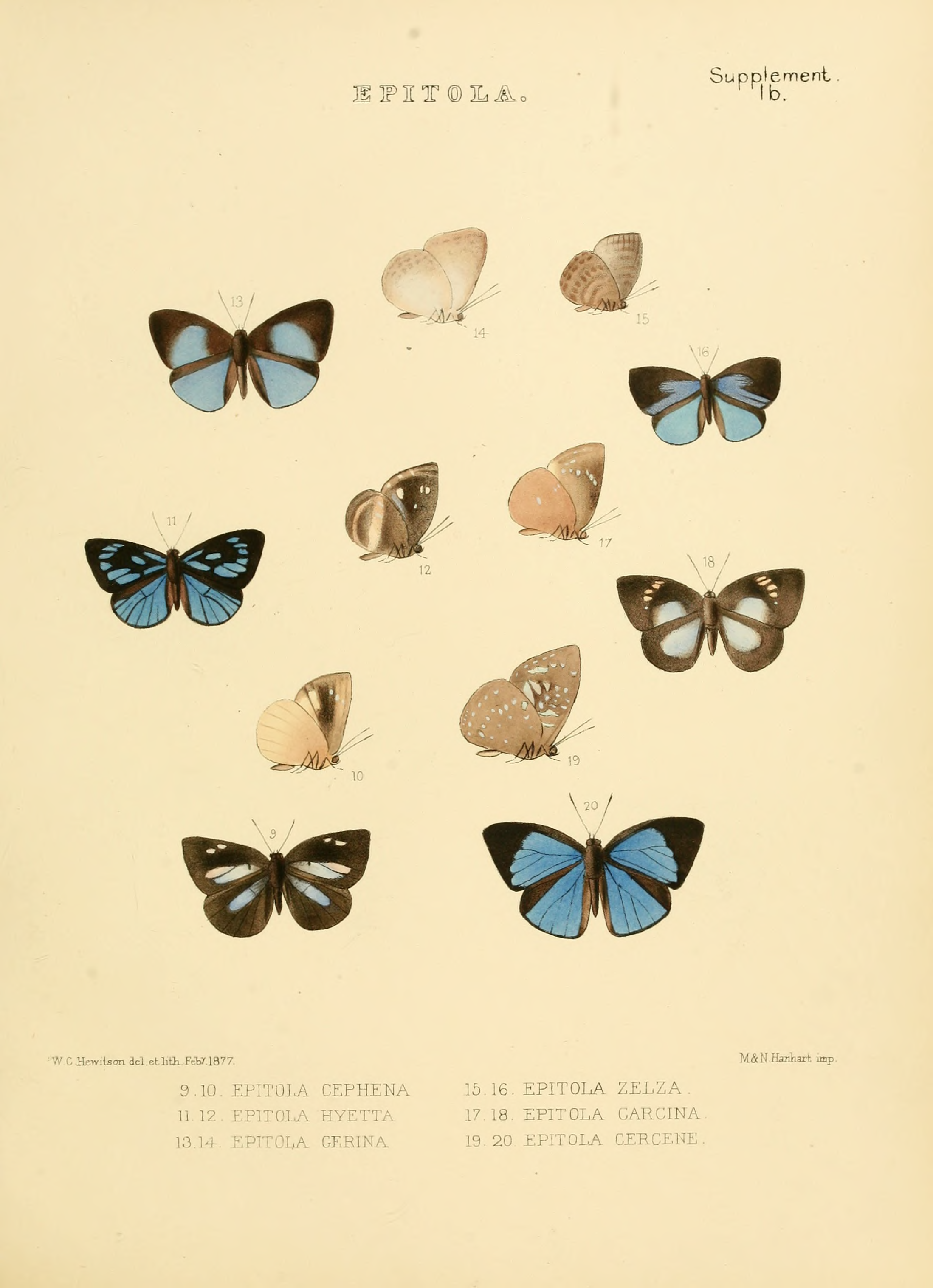
- Geritola gerina figures 13 and 14

Scientific classification
- Domain: Eukaryota
- Kingdom: Animalia
- Phylum: Arthropoda
- Class: Insecta
- Order: Lepidoptera
- Family: Lycaenidae
- Tribe: Liptenini
- Genus: Geritola; Libert, 1999

Synonyms
- Argyrotola Libert, 1999

= Geritola =

Genus of butterflies

Geritola is a genus of butterflies in the family Lycaenidae. The species of this genus are endemic to the Afrotropical realm.

== Species ==
- Subgenus Geritola Libert, 1999
  - Geritola albomaculata (Bethune-Baker, 1903)
  - Geritola amieti Libert, 1999
  - Geritola concepcion (Suffert, 1904)
  - Geritola cyanea (Jackson, 1964)
  - Geritola daveyi (Roche, 1954)
  - Geritola dubia (Jackson, 1964)
  - Geritola frankdaveyi Libert, 1999
  - Geritola gerina (Hewitson, 1878)
  - Geritola goodii (Holland, 1890)
  - Geritola jackiana Collins & Libert, 1999
  - Geritola larae Collins & Libert, 1999
  - Geritola liana (Roche, 1954)
  - Geritola mirifica (Jackson, 1964)
  - Geritola nitide (Druce, 1910)
  - Geritola nitidica Libert & Collins, 1999
  - Geritola prouvosti Bouyer & Libert, 1999
  - Geritola virginea (Bethune-Baker, 1904)
  - Geritola zelica (Kirby, 1890)
- Subgenus Argyrotola Libert, 1999
  - Geritola subargentea (Jackson, 1964)
