= Geritola frankdaveyi =

Scientific classification
- Domain: Eukaryota
- Kingdom: Animalia
- Phylum: Arthropoda
- Class: Insecta
- Order: Lepidoptera
- Family: Lycaenidae
- Genus: Geritola
- Species: G. frankdaveyi

Binomial name
- Geritola frankdaveyi Libert, 1999

Synonyms
- Geritola (Geritola) frankdaveyi

Species of butterfly

Geritola frankdaveyi, the Warri epitola, is a butterfly in the family Lycaenidae. It is found in the Niger Delta of Nigeria. The habitat consists of forests.
