= Geritola nitidica =

Scientific classification
- Domain: Eukaryota
- Kingdom: Animalia
- Phylum: Arthropoda
- Class: Insecta
- Order: Lepidoptera
- Family: Lycaenidae
- Genus: Geritola
- Species: G. nitidica

Binomial name
- Geritola nitidica Libert & Collins, 1999

Synonyms
- Geritola (Geritola) nitidica

Species of butterfly

Geritola nitidica is a butterfly in the family Lycaenidae. It is found in Cameroon and the Republic of the Congo.
