= Geritola mirifica =

Scientific classification
- Domain: Eukaryota
- Kingdom: Animalia
- Phylum: Arthropoda
- Class: Insecta
- Order: Lepidoptera
- Family: Lycaenidae
- Genus: Geritola
- Species: G. mirifica

Binomial name
- Geritola mirifica (Jackson, 1964)

Synonyms
- Epitola mirifica Jackson, 1964; Geritola (Geritola) mirifica

Species of butterfly

Geritola mirifica is a butterfly in the family Lycaenidae. It is found in Cameroon and the Republic of the Congo.
