= Melphina hulstaerti =

Scientific classification
- Kingdom: Animalia
- Phylum: Arthropoda
- Class: Insecta
- Order: Lepidoptera
- Family: Hesperiidae
- Genus: Melphina
- Species: M. hulstaerti

Binomial name
- Melphina hulstaerti Berger, 1974

Synonyms
- Melphina malthina f. hulstaerti Evans, 1956 [In part]

Species of butterfly

Melphina hulstaerti is a butterfly in the family Hesperiidae. It is found in the Democratic Republic of the Congo (Équateur and Tshuapa).
