= Melphina tarace =

Scientific classification
- Domain: Eukaryota
- Kingdom: Animalia
- Phylum: Arthropoda
- Class: Insecta
- Order: Lepidoptera
- Family: Hesperiidae
- Genus: Melphina
- Species: M. tarace

Binomial name
- Melphina tarace (Mabille, 1891)

Synonyms
- Pamphila tarace Mabille, 1891

Species of butterfly

Melphina tarace, the scarce forest swift, is a butterfly in the family Hesperiidae. It is found in Sierra Leone, Ivory Coast, Ghana, Nigeria, Cameroon, the Republic of the Congo, the Central African Republic and north-western Tanzania. The habitat consists of forests.
