= Geritola dubia =

Scientific classification
- Domain: Eukaryota
- Kingdom: Animalia
- Phylum: Arthropoda
- Class: Insecta
- Order: Lepidoptera
- Family: Lycaenidae
- Genus: Geritola
- Species: G. dubia

Binomial name
- Geritola dubia (Jackson, 1964)

Synonyms
- Epitola dubia Jackson, 1964; Geritola (Geritola) dubia

Species of butterfly

Geritola dubia is a butterfly in the family Lycaenidae. It is found in Cameroon, the Republic of the Congo, the Central African Republic, the Democratic Republic of the Congo and Uganda.
