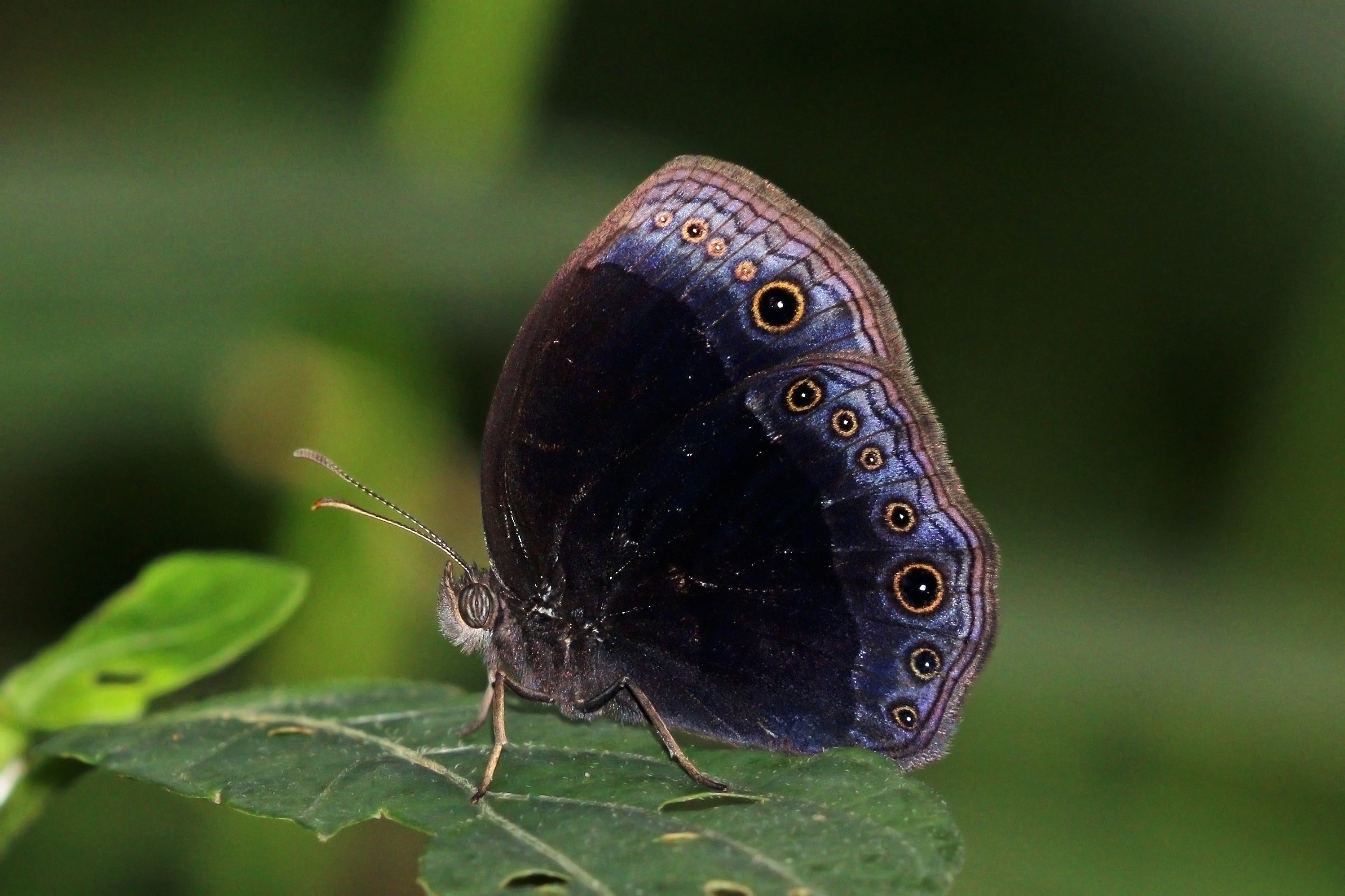
- Male
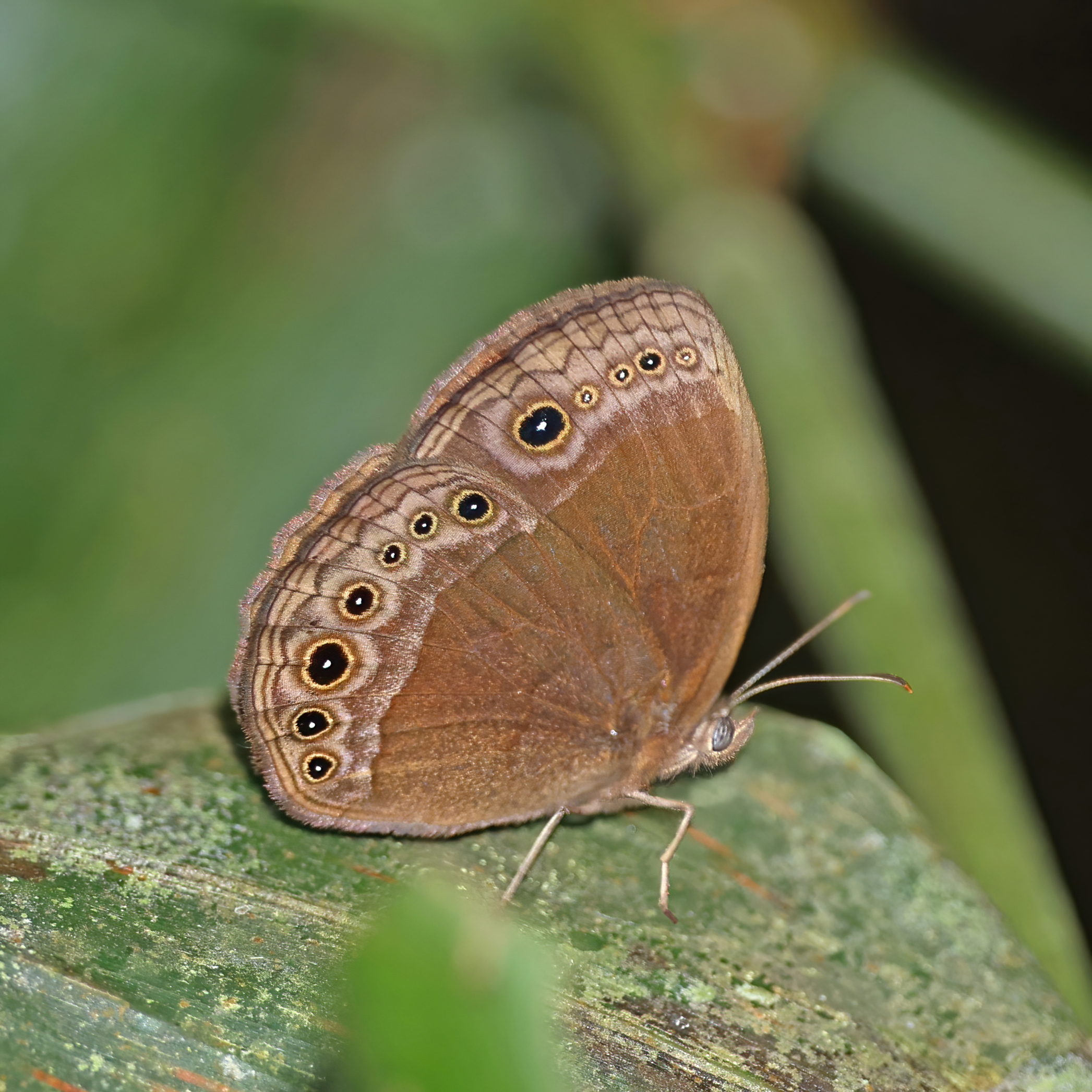
- Female both B. m. martius, Ghana

Scientific classification
- Kingdom: Animalia
- Phylum: Arthropoda
- Clade: Pancrustacea
- Class: Insecta
- Order: Lepidoptera
- Family: Nymphalidae
- Genus: Bicyclus
- Species: B. martius

Binomial name
- Bicyclus martius (Fabricius, 1793)

Synonyms
- Papilio martius Fabricius, 1793; Bicyclus martius f. viettei Condamin, 1961; Bicyclus sanaos melas Condamin, 1965; Mycalesis sanaos Hewitson, 1866; Mycalesis hintzi Strand, 1912; Mycalesis bibundensis Strand, 1913; Mycalesis completa Gaede, 1915

= Bicyclus martius =

Species of butterfly

Bicyclus martius, the black bush brown, is a butterfly in the family Nymphalidae. It is found in Guinea, Sierra Leone, Liberia, Ivory Coast, Ghana, Togo, Nigeria, Equatorial Guinea, Cameroon, the Republic of the Congo, Angola, the Democratic Republic of the Congo, Sudan and Uganda. The habitat consists of lowland primary forests and secondary growth.

The larvae feed on Paspalum conjugatum.

== Subspecies ==
- Bicyclus martius martius (Guinea, Sierra Leone, Liberia, Ivory Coast, Ghana, Togo)
- Bicyclus martius sanaos (Hewitson, 1866) (Nigeria, Bioko, Cameroon, Congo, Angola, Democratic Republic of the Congo, southern Sudan, Uganda)

Torben Larsen developed a species numbering system for his 2005 publication Butterflies of West Africa. The nominate subspecies is #709. The 'Larsen' numbers have since been used with permission in A Sharp Eye on Butterflies of Ghana.
