= Melphina evansi =

Scientific classification
- Kingdom: Animalia
- Phylum: Arthropoda
- Class: Insecta
- Order: Lepidoptera
- Family: Hesperiidae
- Genus: Melphina
- Species: M. evansi

Binomial name
- Melphina evansi Berger, 1974

Synonyms
- Melphina malthina f. hulstaerti Evans, 1956 [In part]

Species of butterfly

Melphina evansi is a butterfly in the family Hesperiidae. It is found in the Democratic Republic of the Congo (Équateur and Tshuapa).
