= Geritola amieti =

Scientific classification
- Domain: Eukaryota
- Kingdom: Animalia
- Phylum: Arthropoda
- Class: Insecta
- Order: Lepidoptera
- Family: Lycaenidae
- Genus: Geritola
- Species: G. amieti

Binomial name
- Geritola amieti Libert, 1999

Synonyms
- Geritola (Geritola) amieti

Species of butterfly

Geritola amieti is a butterfly in the family Lycaenidae. It is found in Cameroon and the Republic of the Congo.
