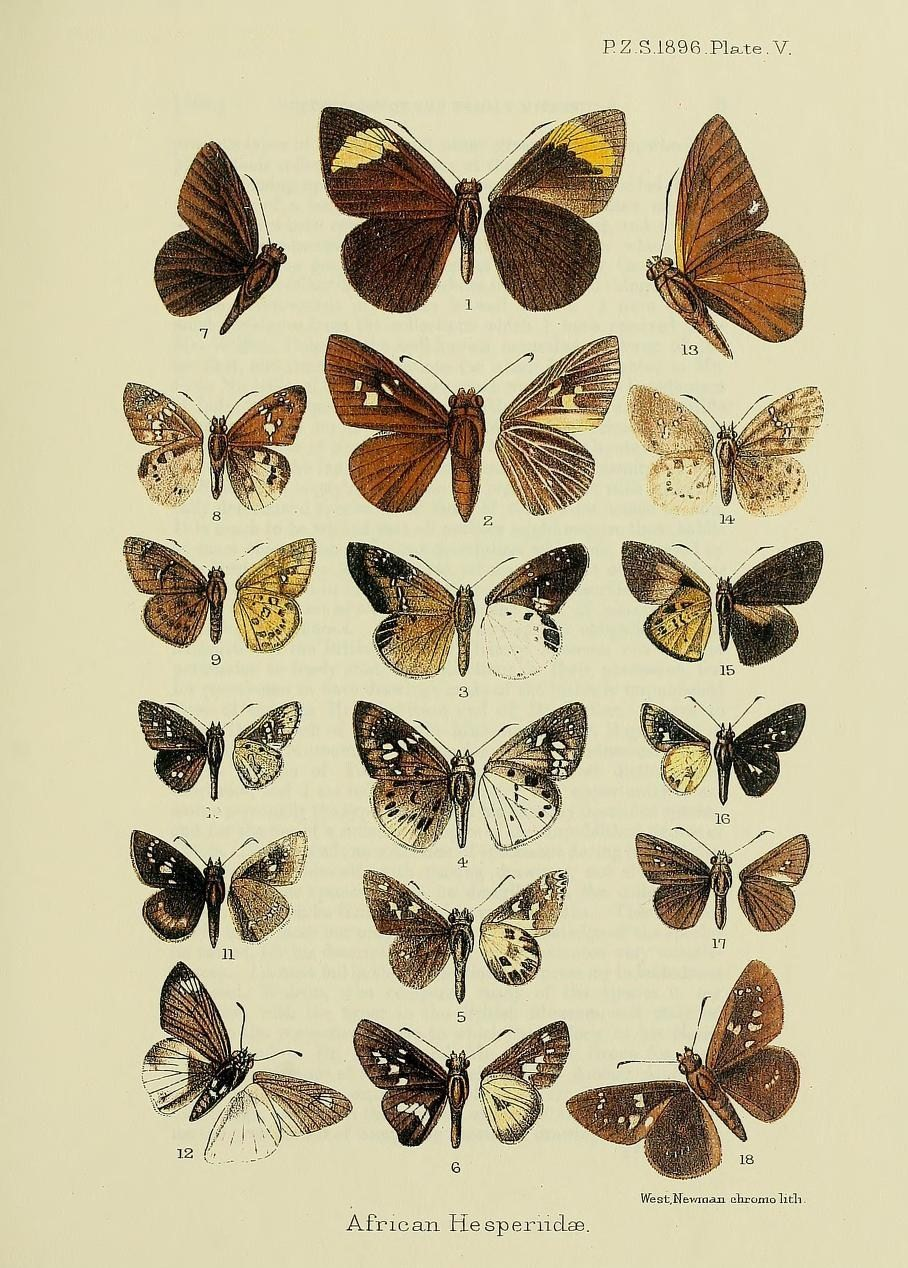
- Melphina statirides, figure 6

Scientific classification
- Kingdom: Animalia
- Phylum: Arthropoda
- Class: Insecta
- Order: Lepidoptera
- Family: Hesperiidae
- Tribe: Erionotini
- Genus: Melphina; Evans, 1937

= Melphina =

Genus of butterflies

Melphina is a genus of skipper butterflies in the family Hesperiidae.

== Species ==
- Melphina evansi Berger, 1974
- Melphina flavina Lindsey & Miller, 1965
- Melphina hulstaerti Berger, 1974
- Melphina malthina (Hewitson, 1876)
- Melphina maximiliani Belcastro & Larsen, 2005
- Melphina melphis (Holland, 1894)
- Melphina noctula (Druce, 1909)
- Melphina statira (Mabille, 1891)
- Melphina statirides (Holland, 1896)
- Melphina tarace (Mabille, 1891)
- Melphina unistriga (Holland, 1893)
