= Melphina noctula =

Scientific classification
- Kingdom: Animalia
- Phylum: Arthropoda
- Clade: Pancrustacea
- Class: Insecta
- Order: Lepidoptera
- Family: Hesperiidae
- Genus: Melphina
- Species: M. noctula

Binomial name
- Melphina noctula (Druce, 1909)

Synonyms
- Parnara noctula Druce, 1909; Parnara palocampta Druce, 1909

Species of butterfly

Melphina noctula, the brown forest swift, is a butterfly in the family Hesperiidae. It is found in Guinea, Ivory Coast, Ghana, Nigeria, Cameroon, the Central African Republic and Uganda. The habitat consists of undisturbed forests.
