= Geritola prouvosti =

Scientific classification
- Kingdom: Animalia
- Phylum: Arthropoda
- Class: Insecta
- Order: Lepidoptera
- Family: Lycaenidae
- Genus: Geritola
- Species: G. prouvosti

Binomial name
- Geritola prouvosti Bouyer & Libert, 1999

Synonyms
- Geritola (Geritola) prouvosti

Species of butterfly

Geritola prouvosti is a butterfly in the family Lycaenidae. It is found in Cameroon.
