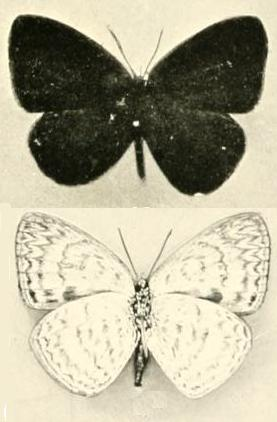

Scientific classification
- Kingdom: Animalia
- Phylum: Arthropoda
- Class: Insecta
- Order: Lepidoptera
- Family: Lycaenidae
- Genus: Geritola
- Species: G. concepcion

Binomial name
- Geritola concepcion (Suffert, 1904)

Synonyms
- Epitola concepcion Suffert, 1904; Geritola (Geritola) concepcion

= Geritola concepcion =

Species of butterfly

Geritola concepcion is a butterfly in the family Lycaenidae. It is found in Cameroon.
