= Geritola subargentea =

Scientific classification
- Domain: Eukaryota
- Kingdom: Animalia
- Phylum: Arthropoda
- Class: Insecta
- Order: Lepidoptera
- Family: Lycaenidae
- Genus: Geritola
- Species: G. subargentea

Binomial name
- Geritola subargentea (Jackson, 1964)

Synonyms
- Epitola subargentea Jackson, 1964; Geritola (Argyrotola) subargentea

Species of butterfly

Geritola subargentea, the silvery epitola, is a butterfly in the family Lycaenidae. It is found in Ivory Coast, Cameroon, the Central African Republic, the Democratic Republic of the Congo, Uganda and Tanzania. Its habitat is the forest.

== Subspecies ==
- Geritola subargentea subargentea (Democratic Republic of the Congo, Uganda, north-western Tanzania)
- Geritola subargentea continua Libert, 1999 (western Ivory Coast, Cameroon, Central African Republic)
