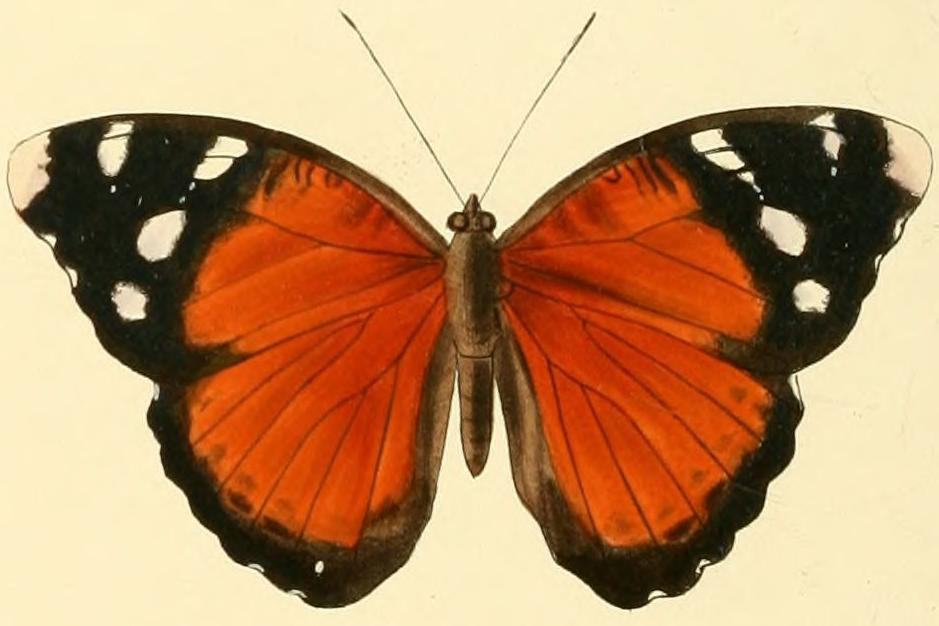

Scientific classification
- Kingdom: Animalia
- Phylum: Arthropoda
- Clade: Pancrustacea
- Class: Insecta
- Order: Lepidoptera
- Family: Nymphalidae
- Genus: Euriphene
- Species: E. atossa

Binomial name
- Euriphene atossa (Hewitson, 1865)

Synonyms
- Aterica atossa Hewitson, 1865; Euriphene (Euriphene) atossa; Aterica amaxia Hewitson, 1866; Diestogyna atossa ab. australis Aurivillius, 1912

= Euriphene atossa =

- male in Ghana

Species of butterfly

Euriphene atossa, the Atossa nymph, is a butterfly in the family Nymphalidae. It is found in Guinea, Sierra Leone, Liberia, Ivory Coast, Ghana, Togo, Nigeria, Cameroon, Equatorial Guinea, the Republic of the Congo, the Central African Republic, the Democratic Republic of the Congo and Uganda. The habitat consists of forests.

The larvae feed on Combretum species

== Subspecies ==
- Euriphene atossa atossa (Guinea, Sierra Leone, Liberia, Ivory Coast, Ghana, Togo, Nigeria, Cameroon, Congo, Central African Republic, Democratic Republic of the Congo: Mayumbe)
- Euriphene atossa angusta Hecq, 1994 (Bioko)
- Euriphene atossa australis d'Abrera, 1980 (western Uganda, Democratic Republic of the Congo: Mongala, Uele, Ituri, north Kivu, Tshopo, Kasai, Sankuru, Lualaba)

Torben Larsen developed a species numbering system for his 2005 publication Butterflies of West Africa. The nominate subspecies is #989. The 'Larsen' numbers have since been used with permission in A Sharp Eye on Butterflies of Ghana.
