= Melphina malthina =

Scientific classification
- Domain: Eukaryota
- Kingdom: Animalia
- Phylum: Arthropoda
- Class: Insecta
- Order: Lepidoptera
- Family: Hesperiidae
- Genus: Melphina
- Species: M. malthina

Binomial name
- Melphina malthina (Hewitson, 1876)

Synonyms
- Hesperia malthina Hewitson, 1876; Pamphila euryspila Mabille, 1891; Melphina melphis f. eala Evans, 1956

Species of butterfly

Melphina malthina, the white-patch forest swift, is a butterfly in the family Hesperiidae. It is found in Sierra Leone, Liberia, Ivory Coast, Ghana, Nigeria, Cameroon, the Republic of the Congo and the Democratic Republic of the Congo. The habitat consists of primary rainforests.
