= Melphina maximiliani =

Scientific classification
- Domain: Eukaryota
- Kingdom: Animalia
- Phylum: Arthropoda
- Class: Insecta
- Order: Lepidoptera
- Family: Hesperiidae
- Genus: Melphina
- Species: M. maximiliani

Binomial name
- Melphina maximiliani Belcastro & Larsen, 2005

Species of butterfly

Melphina maximiliani, the Maximiliano's forest swift, is a butterfly in the family Hesperiidae. It is found in Sierra Leone, Ivory Coast and Ghana. The habitat consists of forests.

Adults are on wing in July and August.
