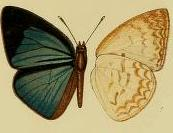

Scientific classification
- Kingdom: Animalia
- Phylum: Arthropoda
- Class: Insecta
- Order: Lepidoptera
- Family: Lycaenidae
- Genus: Geritola
- Species: G. nitide

Binomial name
- Geritola nitide (H. H. Druce, 1910)

Synonyms
- Epitola nitide H. H. Druce, 1910; Geritola (Geritola) nitide

= Geritola nitide =

Species of butterfly

Geritola nitide is a butterfly in the family Lycaenidae first described by Hamilton Herbert Druce in 1910. It is found in Cameroon.
