= Torbenia wojtusiaki =

Scientific classification
- Domain: Eukaryota
- Kingdom: Animalia
- Phylum: Arthropoda
- Class: Insecta
- Order: Lepidoptera
- Family: Lycaenidae
- Genus: Torbenia
- Species: T. wojtusiaki

Binomial name
- Torbenia wojtusiaki Libert, 2000

Species of butterfly

Torbenia wojtusiaki, the Wojtusiak's glasswing, is a butterfly in the family Lycaenidae. It is found in Ivory Coast, Ghana and western Nigeria. The habitat consists of forests.

Adults feed on extrafloral nectaries on Marantochloa shoots.
