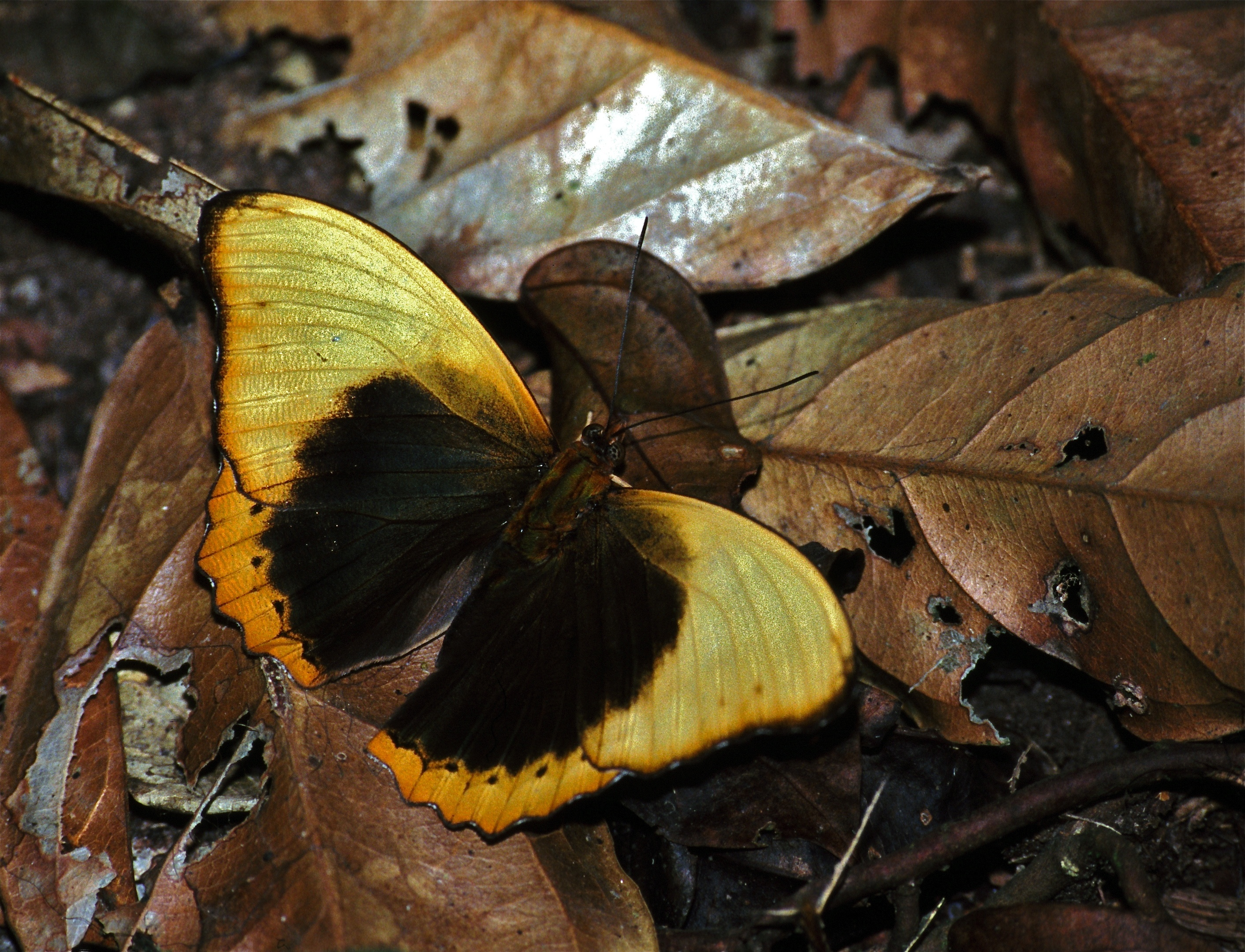
- male C. f. balluca Korup National Park, Cameroon
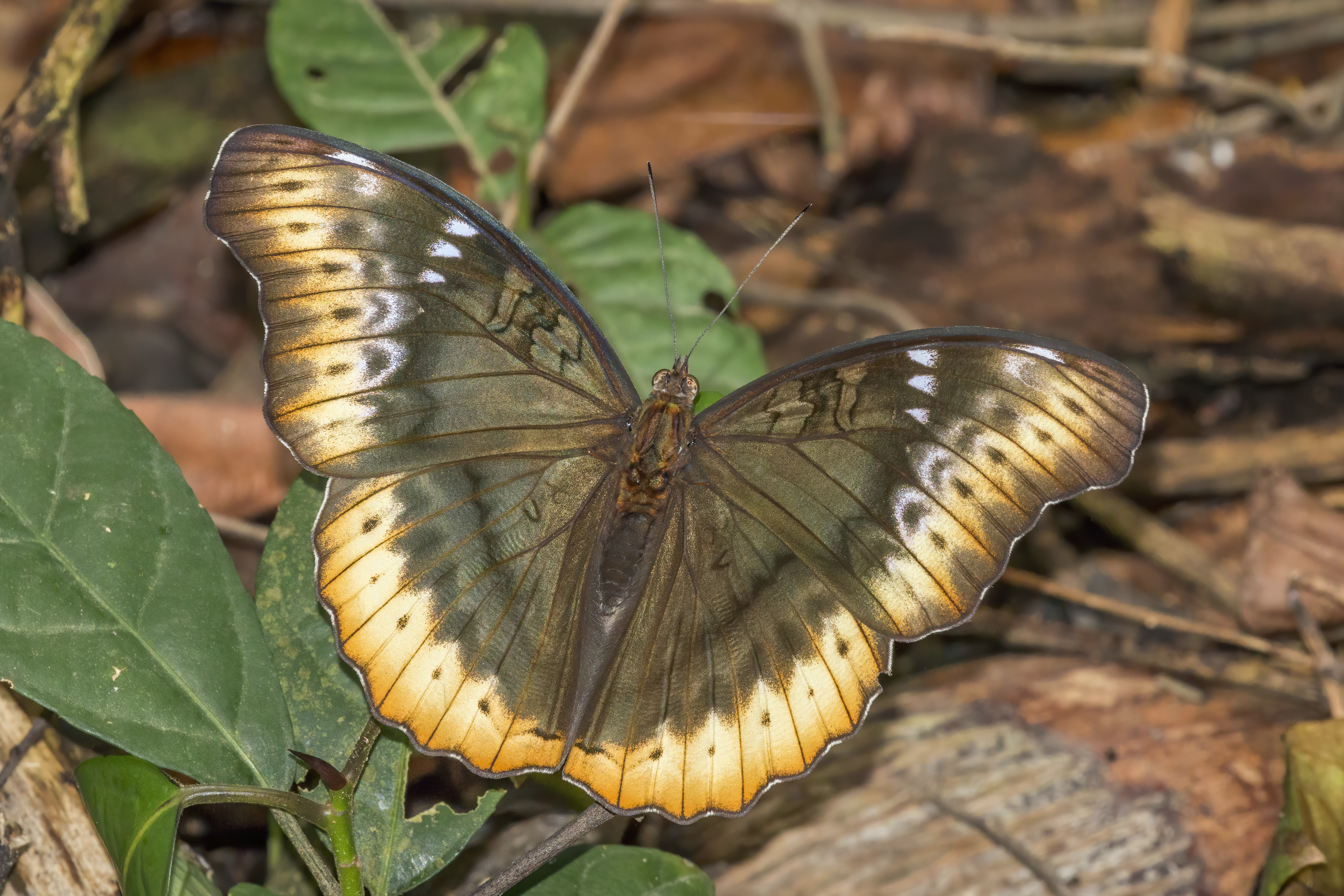
- female C. f. fumana Kakum National Park, Ghana

Scientific classification
- Kingdom: Animalia
- Phylum: Arthropoda
- Clade: Pancrustacea
- Class: Insecta
- Order: Lepidoptera
- Family: Nymphalidae
- Genus: Cymothoe
- Species: C. fumana

Binomial name
- Cymothoe fumana (Westwood, 1850)

Synonyms
- Harma fumana Westwood, 1850; Cymothoe fumana var. eburnea Neustetter, 1916; Cymothoe fumana f. mitella Birket-Smith, 1960

= Cymothoe fumana =

Scalloped yellow glider

Species of butterfly

Cymothoe fumana, the scalloped yellow glider, is a butterfly in the family Nymphalidae. It is found in Guinea, Sierra Leone, Liberia, Ivory Coast, Ghana, Nigeria, Cameroon, Equatorial Guinea, Gabon, the Republic of the Congo, the Central African Republic and the Democratic Republic of the Congo. The habitat consists of forests.

Adults have been recorded feeding on fermented sap oozing from debarked felled trees.

The larvae feed on Rinorea species.

== Subspecies ==
- Cymothoe fumana fumana (Guinea, Sierra Leone, Liberia, Ivory Coast, Ghana)
- Cymothoe fumana balluca Fox & Howarth, 1968 (Nigeria: south and the Cross River loop, Cameroon, Equatorial Guinea, Gabon, Congo, Central African Republic, western Democratic Republic of the Congo)
- Cymothoe fumana villiersi Fox, 1968 (Congo: Monts Chaillu)

Torben Larsen developed a species numbering system for his 2005 publication Butterflies of West Africa. The nominate subspecies is #846. The 'Larsen' numbers have since been used with permission in A Sharp Eye on Butterflies of Ghana.

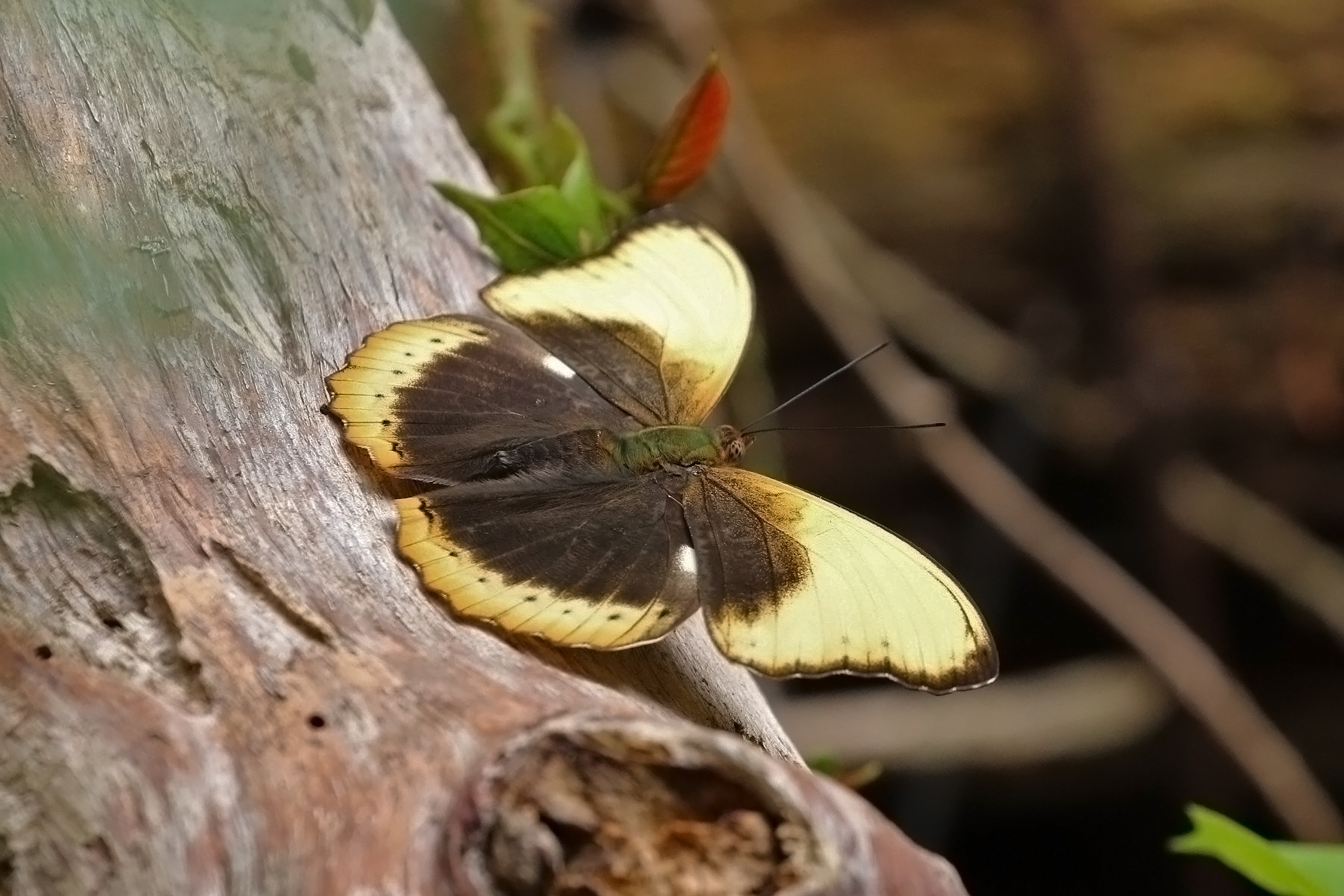
C. f. fumana male
Kakum National Park, Ghana

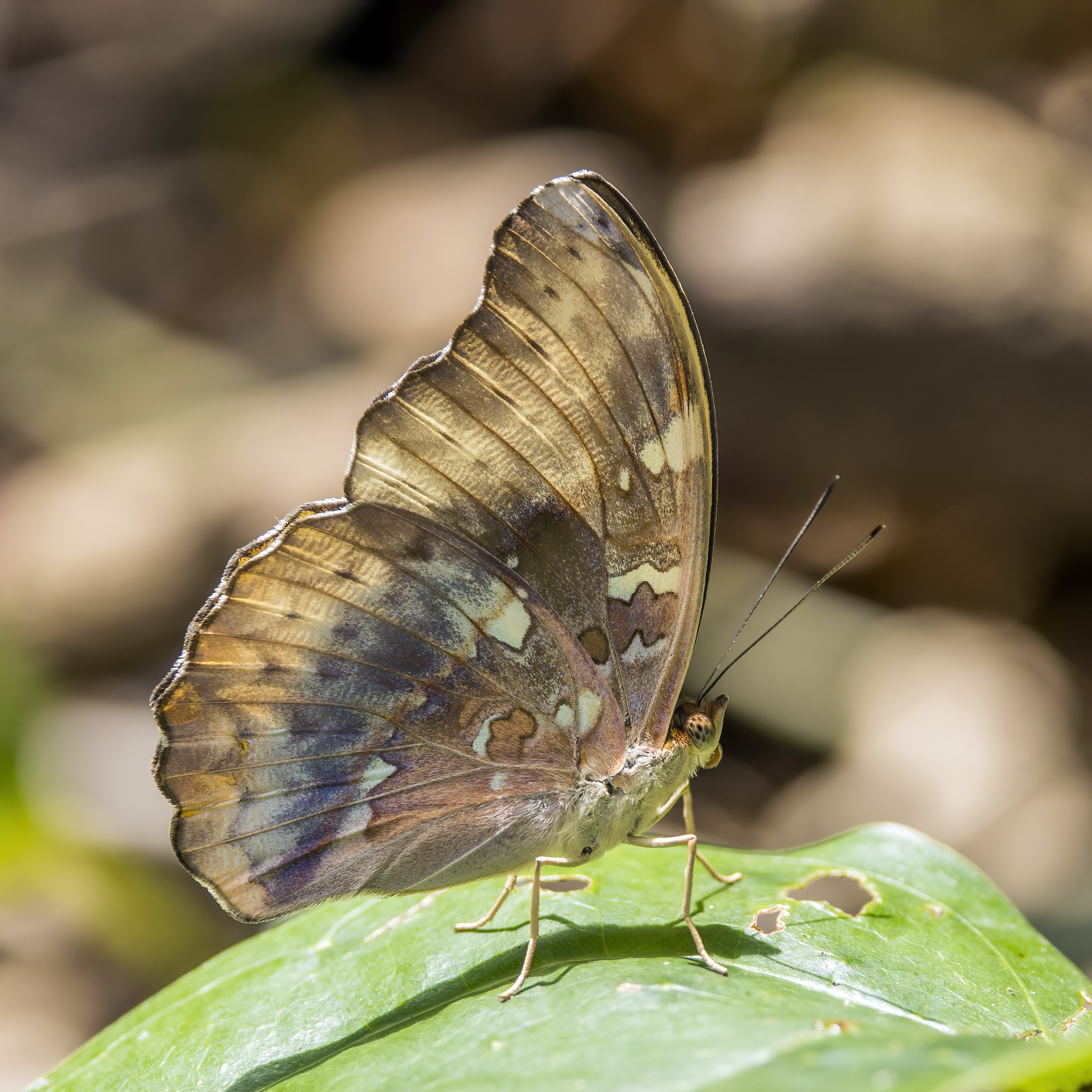
C. f. fumana male
Kakum National Park, Ghana

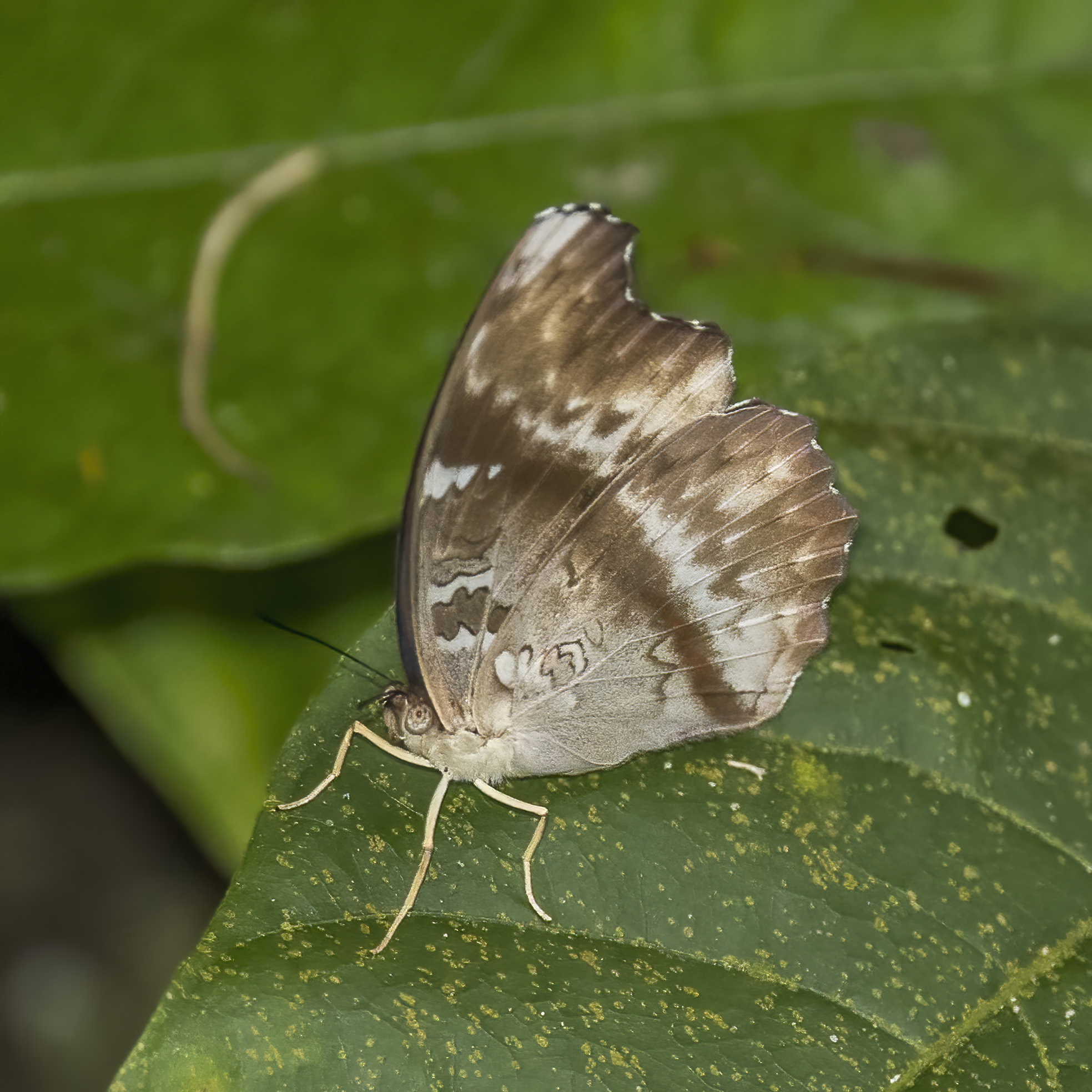
C. f. fumana female
Kakum National Park, Ghana
