= Melphina unistriga =

Scientific classification
- Domain: Eukaryota
- Kingdom: Animalia
- Phylum: Arthropoda
- Class: Insecta
- Order: Lepidoptera
- Family: Hesperiidae
- Genus: Melphina
- Species: M. unistriga

Binomial name
- Melphina unistriga (Holland, 1893)

Synonyms
- Parnara unistriga Holland, 1893

Species of butterfly

Melphina unistriga, the common forest swift, is a butterfly in the family Hesperiidae. It is found in Sierra Leone, Liberia, Ivory Coast, Ghana, Togo, Nigeria, Cameroon, Gabon, the Republic of the Congo, the Central African Republic, the Democratic Republic of the Congo and Uganda. The habitat consists of forests with a closed canopy.
