= Geritola daveyi =

Scientific classification
- Domain: Eukaryota
- Kingdom: Animalia
- Phylum: Arthropoda
- Class: Insecta
- Order: Lepidoptera
- Family: Lycaenidae
- Genus: Geritola
- Species: G. daveyi

Binomial name
- Geritola daveyi (Roche, 1954)

Synonyms
- Epitola daveyi Roche, 1954; Geritola (Geritola) daveyi

Species of butterfly

Geritola daveyi, the Davey's epitola, is a butterfly in the family Lycaenidae. It is found in eastern Nigeria (especially Isoba, in the south-east) and along the coast of Cameroon. The habitat consists of forests.
