= Geritola goodii =

Scientific classification
- Domain: Eukaryota
- Kingdom: Animalia
- Phylum: Arthropoda
- Class: Insecta
- Order: Lepidoptera
- Family: Lycaenidae
- Genus: Geritola
- Species: G. goodii

Binomial name
- Geritola goodii (Holland, 1890)

Synonyms
- Epitola goodii Holland, 1890; Geritola (Geritola) goodii

Species of butterfly

Geritola goodii, the Good's epitola, is a butterfly in the family Lycaenidae. It is found in eastern Nigeria, Cameroon, Gabon, the Republic of the Congo, the Central African Republic, the Democratic Republic of the Congo, Uganda and north-western Tanzania. The habitat consists of forests.
