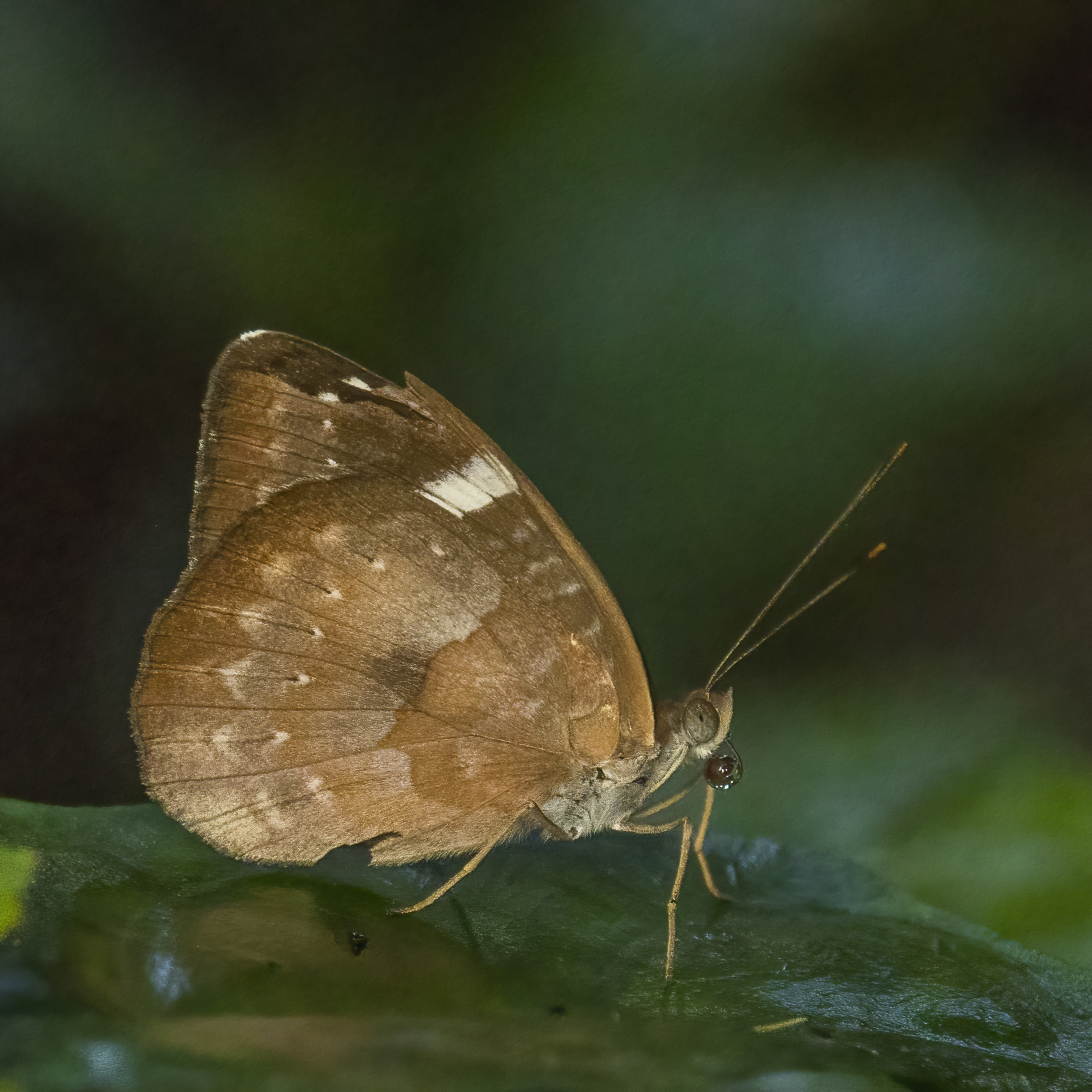
- in Ghana

Scientific classification
- Kingdom: Animalia
- Phylum: Arthropoda
- Clade: Pancrustacea
- Class: Insecta
- Order: Lepidoptera
- Family: Nymphalidae
- Genus: Euriphene
- Species: E. incerta

Binomial name
- Euriphene incerta (Aurivillius, 1912)

Synonyms
- Diestogyna incerta Aurivillius, 1912; Euriphene (Euriphene) incerta; Diestogyna cyriaca Hulstaert, 1924; Euriphene cyriaca; Diestogyna theodota Hulstaert, 1924

= Euriphene incerta =

Species of butterfly

Euriphene incerta, the uncertain nymph, is a butterfly in the family Nymphalidae. It is found in Sierra Leone, Ivory Coast, Ghana, Nigeria, Cameroon, the Republic of the Congo, Equatorial Guinea, the Democratic Republic of the Congo and Zambia. The habitat consists of wetter forests.

The larvae feed on Uapaca species.

== Subspecies ==
- Euriphene incerta incerta (Sierra Leone, Ivory Coast, Ghana, Nigeria, Cameroon, Congo, Democratic Republic of the Congo: Equateur, Tshuapa, Tshopo, Uele, Ituri)
- Euriphene incerta biokensis Hecq, 1994 (Bioko)
- Euriphene incerta theodota (Hulstaert, 1924) (Zambia, Democratic Republic of the Congo: south to Lomami, Lualaba and Sankuru)

Torben Larsen developed a species numbering system for his 2005 publication Butterflies of West Africa. The nominate subspecies is #959. The 'Larsen' numbers have since been used with permission in A Sharp Eye on Butterflies of Ghana.
