= Torbenia persimilis =

Scientific classification
- Domain: Eukaryota
- Kingdom: Animalia
- Phylum: Arthropoda
- Class: Insecta
- Order: Lepidoptera
- Family: Lycaenidae
- Genus: Torbenia
- Species: T. persimilis

Binomial name
- Torbenia persimilis Libert, 2000

Species of butterfly

Torbenia persimilis, the Libert's glasswing, is a butterfly in the family Lycaenidae. It is found in Nigeria (the Cross River loop), Cameroon and Gabon. The habitat consists of forests.
