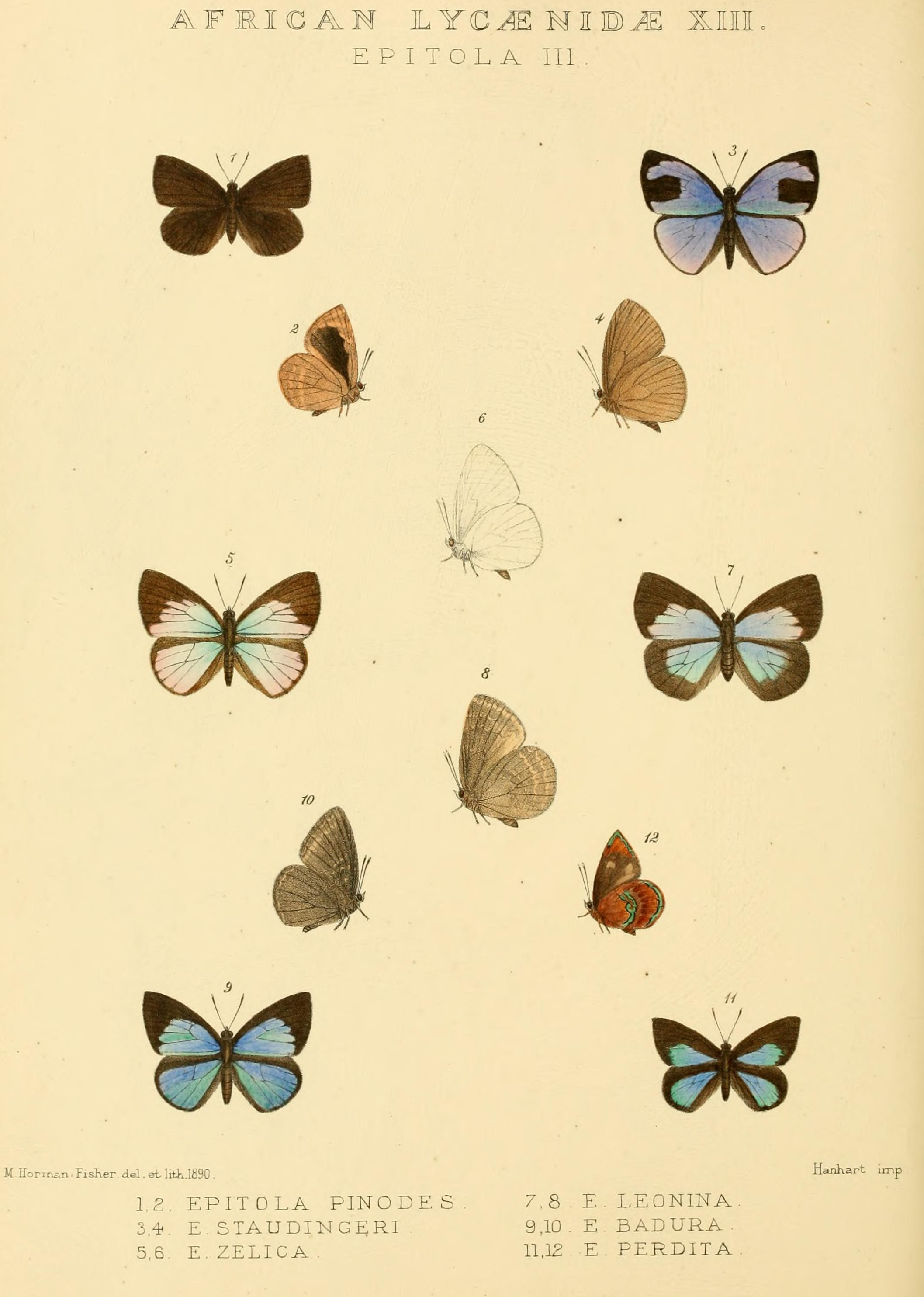

Scientific classification
- Domain: Eukaryota
- Kingdom: Animalia
- Phylum: Arthropoda
- Class: Insecta
- Order: Lepidoptera
- Family: Lycaenidae
- Genus: Geritola
- Species: G. zelica

Binomial name
- Geritola zelica (Kirby, 1890)

Synonyms
- Epitola zelica Kirby, 1890; Geritola (Geritola) zelica; Epitola subalba Bethune-Baker, 1915

= Geritola zelica =

Species of butterfly

Geritola zelica is a butterfly in the family Lycaenidae. It is found in Cameroon and Uganda.
