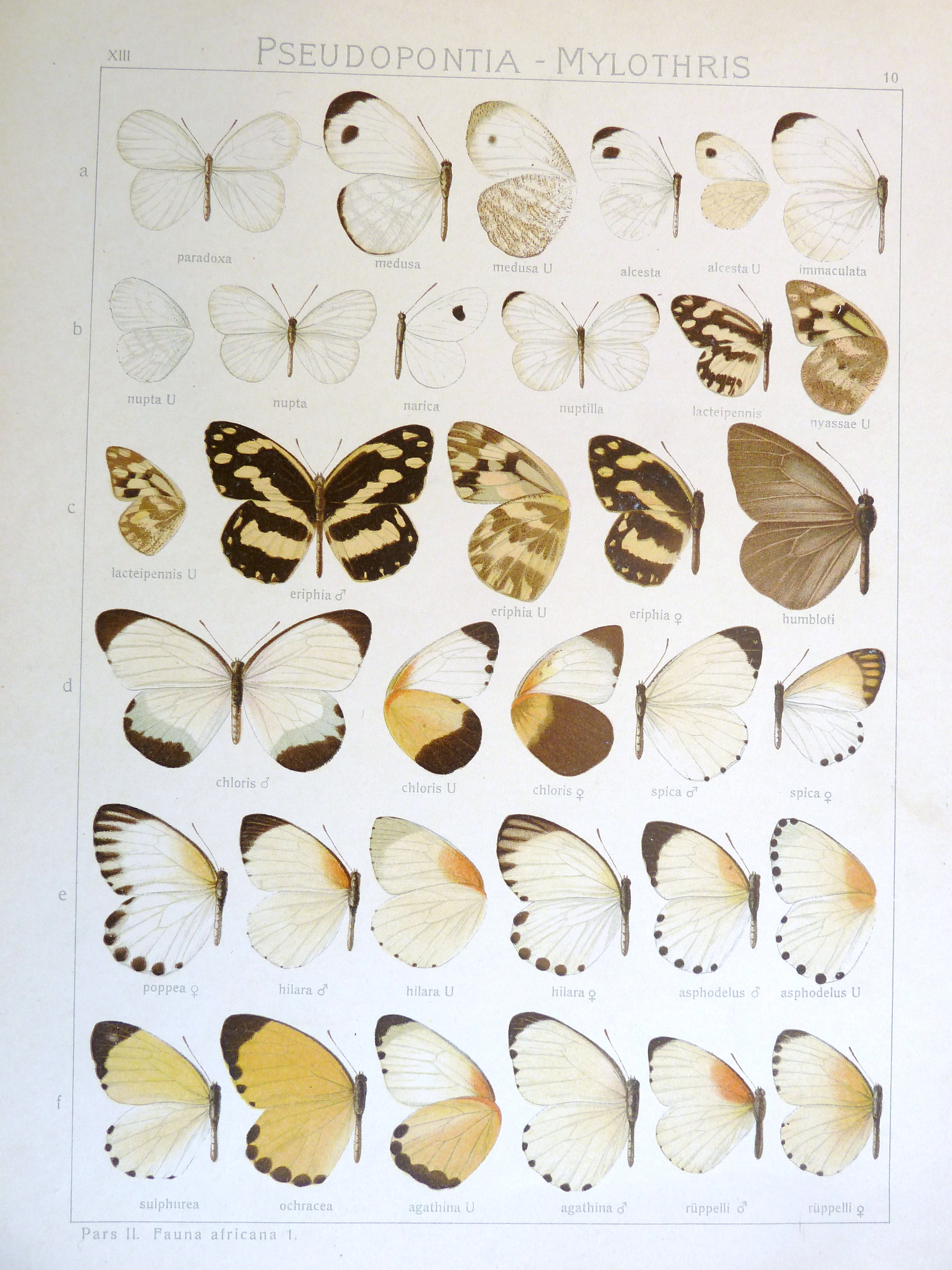

Scientific classification
- Kingdom: Animalia
- Phylum: Arthropoda
- Clade: Pancrustacea
- Class: Insecta
- Order: Lepidoptera
- Family: Pieridae
- Genus: Mylothris
- Species: M. hilara

Binomial name
- Mylothris hilara (Karsch, 1892)

Synonyms
- Pieris hilara Karsch, 1892; Mylothris poppea furvus Bernardi, 1953; Mylothris poppea hilara f. furvus Talbot, 1944

= Mylothris hilara =

Hilara dotted border

Species of butterfly

Mylothris hilara, the hilara dotted border, is a butterfly in the family Pieridae. It is found in Guinea, Ivory Coast, Nigeria, Cameroon, Equatorial Guinea, the Republic of the Congo, the Democratic Republic of the Congo, Uganda and Kenya. Its habitat consists of submontane and lowland forests.

== Subspecies ==
- Mylothris hilara hilara (Guinea, Ivory Coast, Nigeria, Cameroon)
- Mylothris hilara furvus Bernardi, 1953 (Equatorial Guinea: Bioko)
- Mylothris hilara goma Berger, 1981 (Cameroon, Equatorial Guinea, Congo, Democratic Republic of the Congo, Uganda, western Kenya)
