= Torbenia aurivilliusi =

Scientific classification
- Domain: Eukaryota
- Kingdom: Animalia
- Phylum: Arthropoda
- Class: Insecta
- Order: Lepidoptera
- Family: Lycaenidae
- Genus: Torbenia
- Species: T. aurivilliusi

Binomial name
- Torbenia aurivilliusi (Stempffer, 1967)

Synonyms
- Ornipholidotos aurivilliusi Stempffer, 1967

Species of insect (butterfly)

Torbenia aurivilliusi is a butterfly in the family Lycaenidae. It is found in Cameroon, Equatorial Guinea, Gabon and the Republic of the Congo. The habitat consists of forests.
