= Euphaedra hewitsoni =

Scientific classification
- Kingdom: Animalia
- Phylum: Arthropoda
- Class: Insecta
- Order: Lepidoptera
- Family: Nymphalidae
- Genus: Euphaedra
- Species: E. hewitsoni

Binomial name
- Euphaedra hewitsoni Hecq, 1974

Synonyms
- Euphaedra (Xypetana) hewitsoni

Species of butterfly

Euphaedra hewitsoni, or Hewitson's pink forester, is a butterfly in the family Nymphalidae. It is found in Nigeria, Cameroon, Equatorial Guinea, Gabon, the Republic of the Congo, the Central African Republic, the Democratic Republic of the Congo and Uganda. The habitat consists of wet forests.

== Subspecies ==
- E. h. hewitsoni (Cameroon, Gabon, Congo)
- E. h. angusta Hecq, 1974 (northern and eastern Democratic Republic of the Congo, Uganda)
- E. h. bipuncta Hecq, 1974 (southern Central African Republic, western and central Democratic Republic of Congo)
- E. h. disclara Hecq, 1991 (Bioko)
- E. h. sumptuosa Hecq, 1974 (southern Nigeria, western Cameroon)
