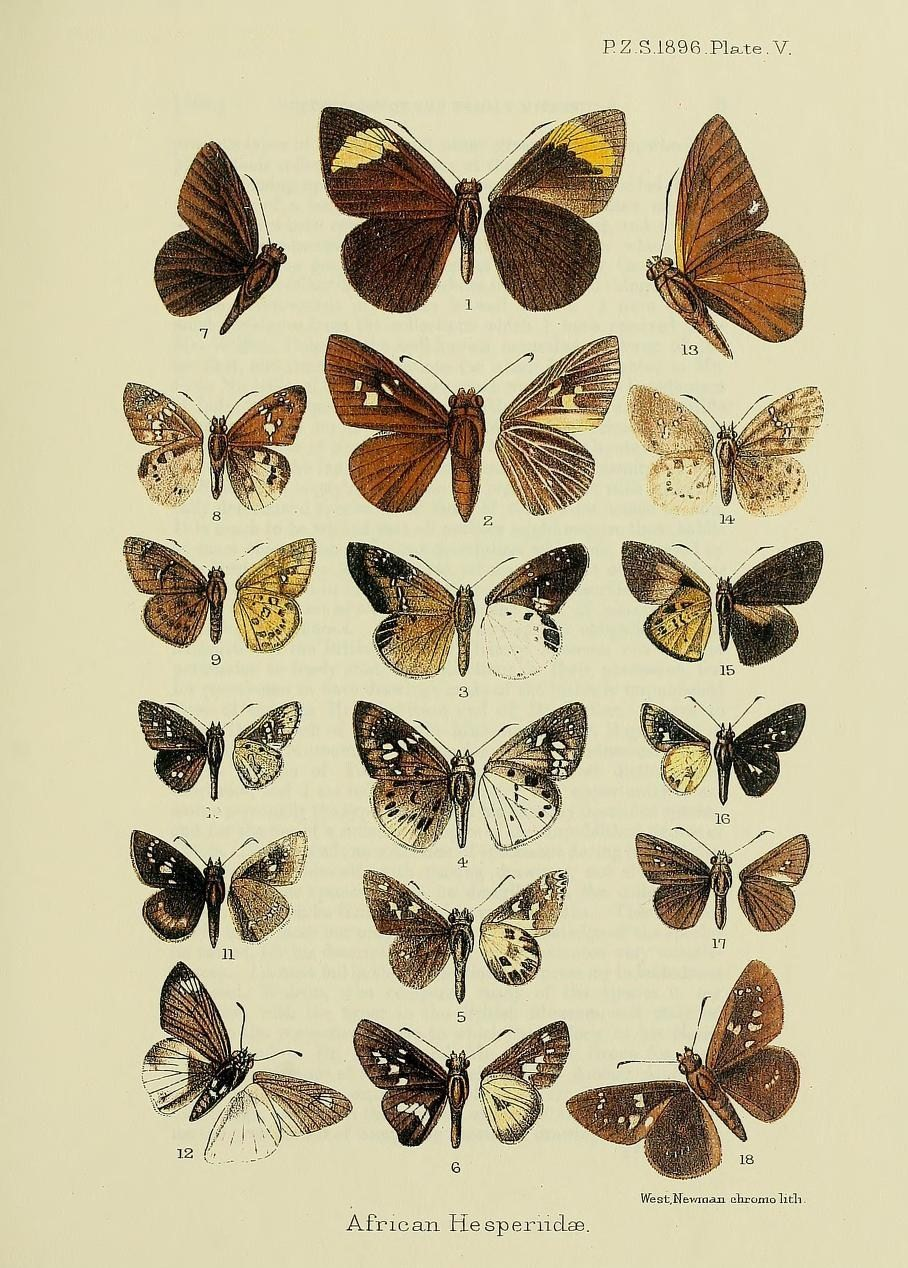
- Melphina statirides figure 6

Scientific classification
- Domain: Eukaryota
- Kingdom: Animalia
- Phylum: Arthropoda
- Class: Insecta
- Order: Lepidoptera
- Family: Hesperiidae
- Genus: Melphina
- Species: M. statirides

Binomial name
- Melphina statirides (Holland, 1896)

Synonyms
- Baoris statirides Holland, 1896; Parnara flavifasciola Druce, 1909

= Melphina statirides =

Species of butterfly

Melphina statirides, the brown-margin forest swift, is a butterfly in the family Hesperiidae. It is found in Sierra Leone, Liberia, Ivory Coast, Ghana, Nigeria, Cameroon, Equatorial Guinea, Gabon and the Republic of the Congo. The habitat of the butterfly consists of forests.

The larvae feed on Alchornea cordifolia.
