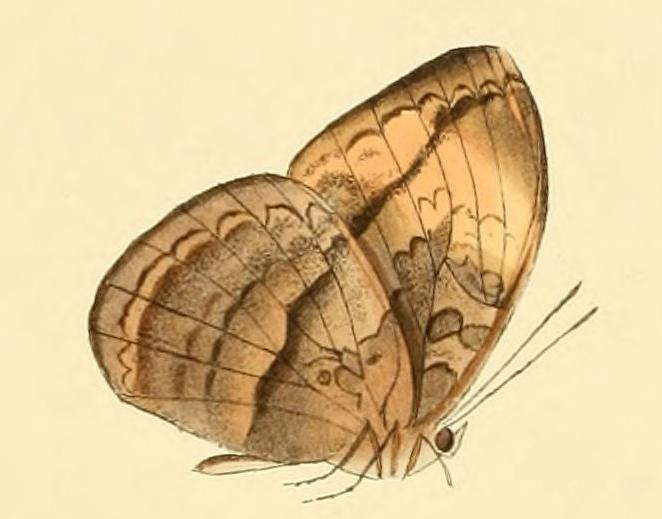

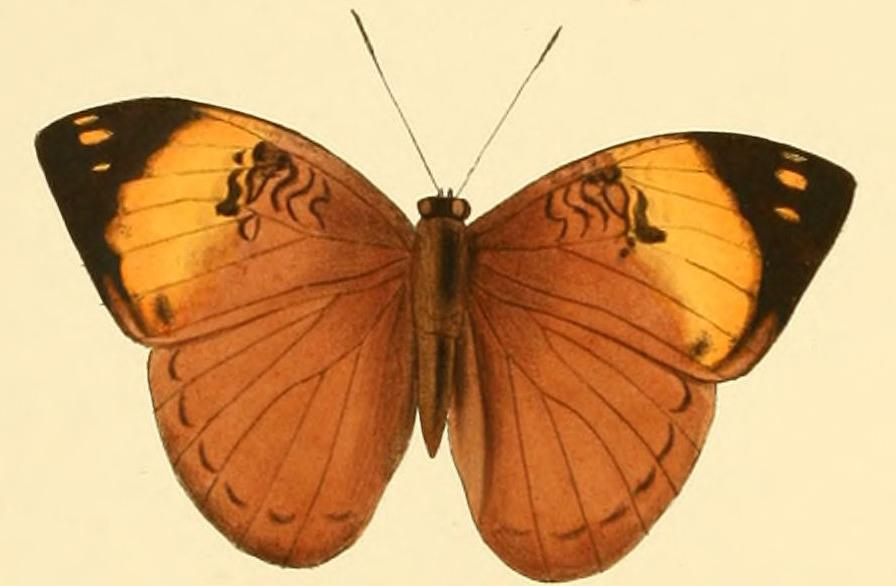

Scientific classification
- Kingdom: Animalia
- Phylum: Arthropoda
- Class: Insecta
- Order: Lepidoptera
- Family: Nymphalidae
- Genus: Bebearia
- Species: B. cinaethon

Binomial name
- Bebearia cinaethon (Hewitson, 1874)

Synonyms
- Euryphene cinaethon Hewitson, 1874

= Bebearia cinaethon =

Species of butterfly

Bebearia cinaethon is a butterfly in the family Nymphalidae. It is found in Equatorial Guinea, Gabon, the Republic of the Congo and the Democratic Republic of the Congo.

E. cinaethon Hew. (40 e). In the male the wings are lighter brown above with distinct submarginal line; the yellow transverse band of the forewing is very broad, the spots before the apex small and yellow; the apical part outside the transverse band is blackish; the markings of the under surface recall those of comus, but are a mixture of brown and grey without the bright violet colour of that species. The female is similar to the male above, but much darker, black-brown, and with somewhat narrower transverse band on the forewing; the under surface agrees almost entirely with that of ikelemba (41 e). In both sexes the dark submarginal line of the forewing is at least in cellules 1 a—3 almost straight, neither undulate not angled, only very weakly dentate. Gaboon and French Congo.

== Subspecies ==
- Bebearia cinaethon cinaethon (Equatorial Guinea, Gabon, Congo, Democratic Republic of the Congo: Mayumbe)
- Bebearia cinaethon ikelemboides Hecq, 1989 (Democratic Republic of the Congo: Kinshasa)
