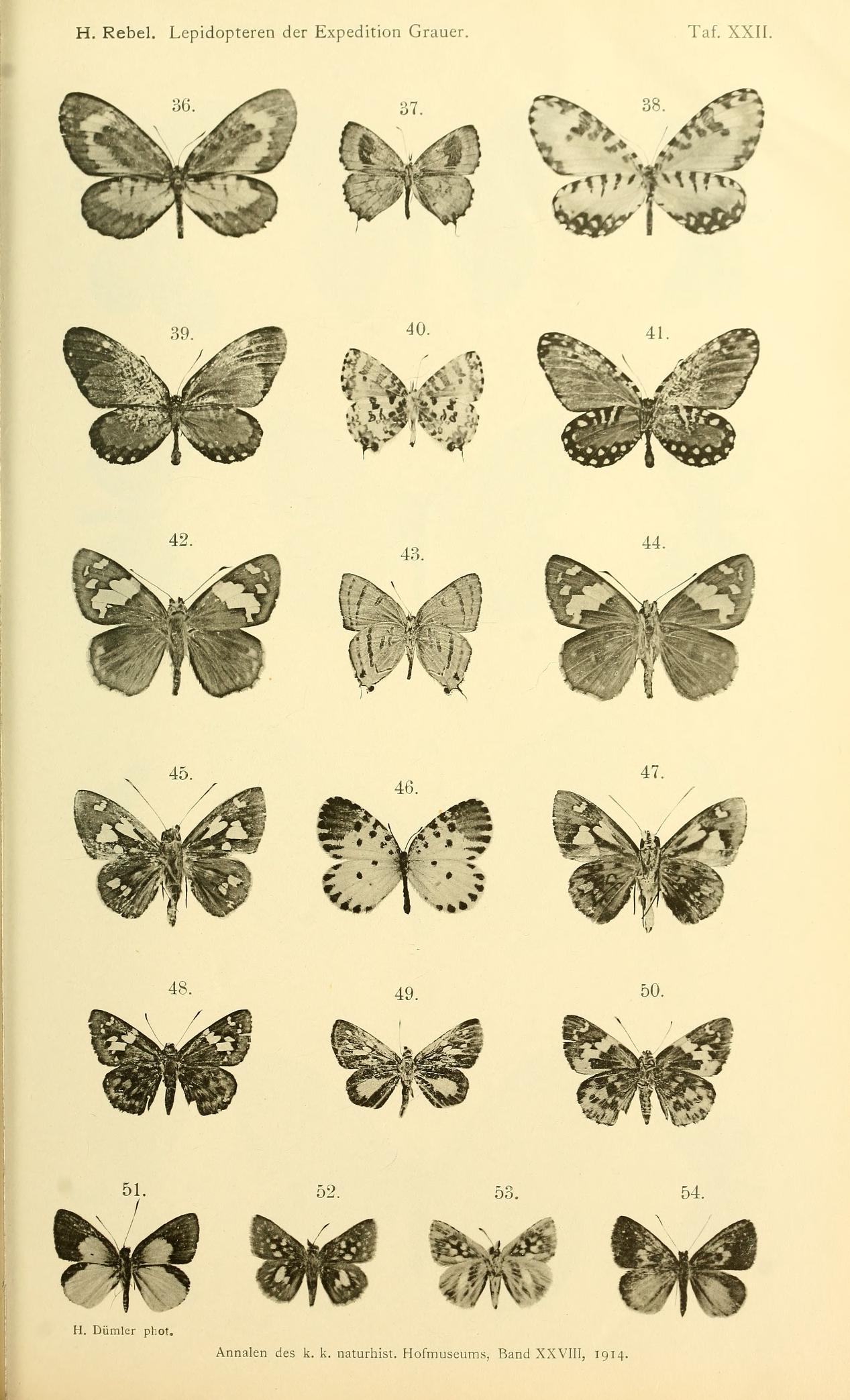
- Figure 51

Scientific classification
- Kingdom: Animalia
- Phylum: Arthropoda
- Class: Insecta
- Order: Lepidoptera
- Family: Hesperiidae
- Genus: Ceratrichia
- Species: C. flava

Binomial name
- Ceratrichia flava Hewitson, 1878

Synonyms
- Plastingia charita Plötz, 1879; Ceratrichia fasciata Aurivillius, 1896; Ceratrichia fasciata var. tessmanniana Strand, 1912; Ceratrichia flava benitoensis Miller, 1964

= Ceratrichia flava =

Yellow forest sylph

Species of butterfly

Ceratrichia flava, commonly known as the yellow forest sylph, is a species of butterfly in the family Hesperiidae. It is found in Nigeria, Cameroon, Equatorial Guinea, Gabon, the Republic of the Congo and the Central African Republic. The habitat consists of open areas in forests.

Adults are attracted to flowers, including the ones of Costus species.

== Subspecies ==
- Ceratrichia flava flava (Nigeria: Cross River loop, Cameroon, Equatorial Guinea, Gabon, Congo, Central African Republic)
- Ceratrichia flava fernanda Evans, 1937 (Equatorial Guinea: Bioko)
