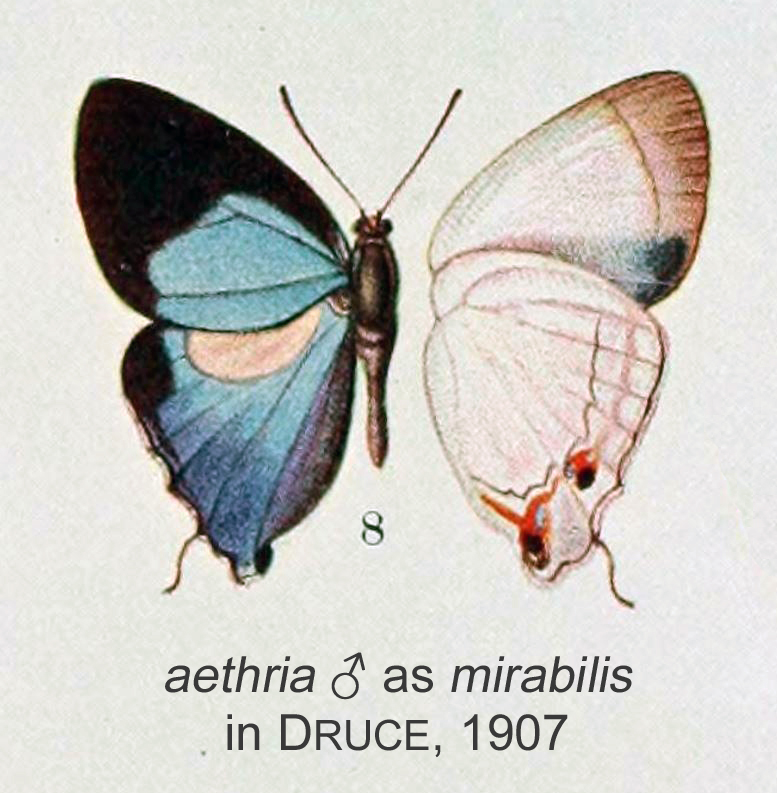

Scientific classification
- Kingdom: Animalia
- Phylum: Arthropoda
- Class: Insecta
- Order: Lepidoptera
- Family: Lycaenidae
- Genus: Iolaus
- Species: I. aethria

Binomial name
- Iolaus aethria Karsch, 1893

Synonyms
- Iolaus (Epamera) aethria; Epamera mirabilis Druce, 1903

= Iolaus aethria =

Species of butterfly

Iolaus aethria, Karsch's sapphire, is a butterfly in the family Lycaenidae. It is found in Guinea, Sierra Leone, Liberia, Ivory Coast, Ghana, Togo, Nigeria (south and the Cross River loop), Cameroon and on Bioko. The habitat consists of forests.

The larvae feed on the flowers of Loranthus incanus.
