= Geritola larae =

Scientific classification
- Kingdom: Animalia
- Phylum: Arthropoda
- Clade: Pancrustacea
- Class: Insecta
- Order: Lepidoptera
- Family: Lycaenidae
- Genus: Geritola
- Species: G. larae

Binomial name
- Geritola larae Collins & Libert, 1999

Synonyms
- Geritola (Geritola) larae

Species of butterfly

Geritola larae is a butterfly in the family Lycaenidae. It is found in Cameroon, Equatorial Guinea and the Republic of the Congo.
