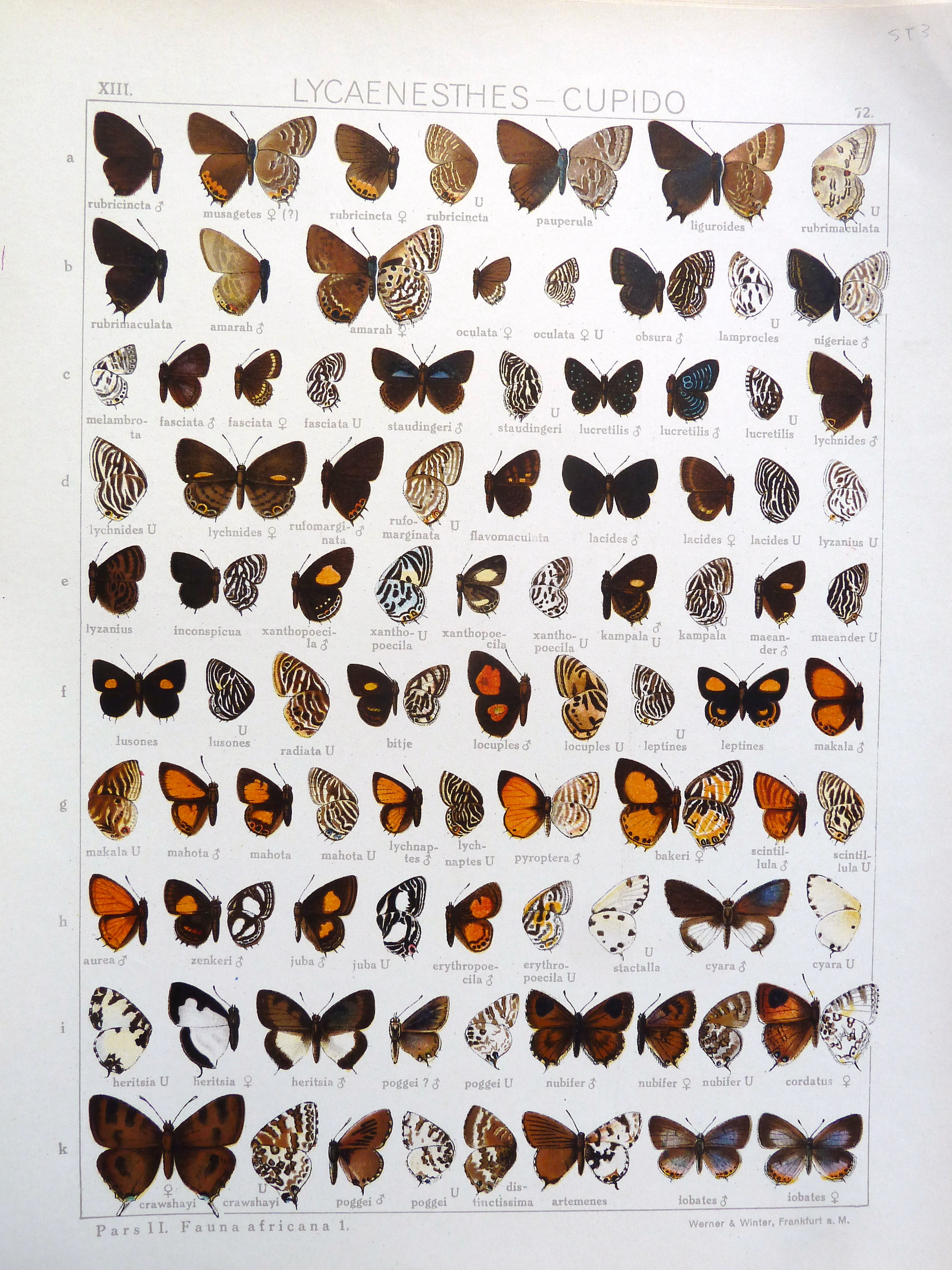
- g

Scientific classification
- Domain: Eukaryota
- Kingdom: Animalia
- Phylum: Arthropoda
- Class: Insecta
- Order: Lepidoptera
- Family: Lycaenidae
- Genus: Anthene
- Species: A. mahota

Binomial name
- Anthene mahota (Grose-Smith, 1887)

Synonyms
- Lycaenesthes mahota Grose-Smith, 1887; Anthene (Anthene) mahota

= Anthene mahota =

Mahota ciliate blue

Species of butterfly

Anthene mahota, the Mahota ciliate blue, is a butterfly in the family Lycaenidae. It is found in Liberia, Ivory Coast, Nigeria (the Cross River loop), Cameroon, Equatorial Guinea (Mbini), Gabon, the Republic of the Congo and the Democratic Republic of the Congo (Mongala and Sankuru). The habitat consists of dense forests.
