= Torben Bjørn Larsen =

Danish entomologist (1944–2015)

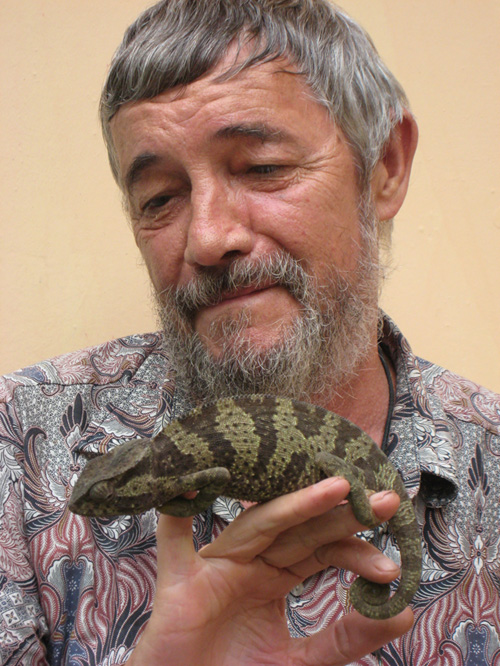
Torben Bjørn Larsen

Torben Bjørn Larsen (12 January 1944 – 21 May 2015) was a Danish economist and lepidopterist who studied butterflies particularly in Asia and Africa. He wrote books on the butterflies of west Africa, the Middle East and numerous papers, including descriptions of many new taxa. Based on his travels on work and studies of butterflies he also published a book on his adventures.

== Life and work ==
Larsen was born in Copenhagen, Denmark but his early days were spent in Greece where he became interested in butterflies. He grew up with his grandmother in Copenhagen briefly and then moved to live in India from 1951. His father worked for the UNICEF and he was sent in 1954 to a Danish mission school in Kotagiri in the Nilgiris in southern India. In 1958 he went to Denmark to continue studies and received a master's degree in economics from the University of Copenhagen in 1970. He married Kiki in 1971 (died 1989) and worked as a social demographer in the area of family planning with the International Planned Parenthood Federation in Beirut for a while during which time he published the Butterflies of Lebanon (1974).

== Lepidoptera ==
In 1958 Larsen tried to identify a Neptis species he had collected in the Nilgiris and was surprised when the insect curator (Sören Ludvig Paul Tuxen) at the Copenhagen museum could not help him identify it. It was then that he realized how little was known about the butterflies of the world and it was not until 1986 that he was able to identify that particular Neptis as Neptis nata. In 1975 he moved to London where he pursued his doctoral thesis on the butterflies of the Middle East. Shortly after receiving his doctorate in 1984 he moved to work for DANIDA in India with his (second) wife Nancy Fee who worked for the World Health Organization. He studied butterflies in the various places where they lived and worked including the Philippines, Bangladesh, Ecuador, Papua New Guinea, Nigeria, Cameroon, Sierra Leone and Côte d’Ivoire. He collaborated on butterfly research with the Royal Africa Museum (MRAC), the African Butterfly Research Institute and other organizations. He was elected president of the Association for Tropical Lepidoptera in 1996. The genus Torbenia was named after him. He wrote several books on butterflies, and also a series of papers on anecdotes including those on the hazards of butterfly collecting.

Larsen examined the palatability of aposematic and non-aposematic butterflies by personally tasting a number of species in Madagascar and Ethiopia. In 1991 he tried experiments with the feeding choices of Chamaeleo dilepis in Botswana. In 2006 he conducted experiments on the choices made by Chamaeleo gracilis in Sierra Leone. He noted that it avoided Danaus, Acraea and Amauris.

Larsen developed a species numbering system for his 2005 publication Butterflies of West Africa. The 'Larsen' numbers have since been used with permission in A Sharp Eye on Butterflies of Ghana.

== Writings ==
Apart from his articles to journals, Larsen wrote several books including:

- Larsen, T.B. 1990. The butterflies of Egypt. Apollo Books, Svendborg, Denmark.
- Larsen, T.B. (1991, 1996) The Butterflies of Kenya and their Natural History. Oxford University Press, Oxford
- Larsen, T.B. 2004. Butterflies of Bangladesh – an annotated checklist. IUCN, Bangladesh.
- Larsen, T.B. 2005. Butterflies of West Africa. 2 vols, Apollo Books, Svendborg, Denmark

He wrote a long-running series of anecdotes on his travels and butterfly collection trips in The Entomologist's Record and Journal of Variation which was later compiled into the book Hazards of Butterfly Collecting (2004).

- ———— (1979). "Hazards of butterfly collecting, Colombo, Sri Lanka". The Entomologist's Record and Journal of Variation. 91: 221. (Written in London 1978)
- ———— (1980). "Hazards of butterfly collecting, Nigeria". The Entomologist's Record and Journal of Variation. 92: 86–87. (Written in London 1978)
- ———— (1981). "Hazards of butterfly collecting, India". The Entomologist's Record and Journal of Variation. 93: 196–197. (Written in London 1980)
- ———— (1987). "Hazards of butterfly collecting - Korea". Butterfly News, 12: 7. (Written in New Delhi 1985)
- ———— (1987). "Hazards of butterfly collecting - Papua New Guinea". Butterfly News. 13: 3. (Written in India 1984)
- ———— (1989). "Hazards of butterfly collecting - Dhofar, 1981". The Entomologist's Record and Journal of Variation. 101: 38–39. (Written in India 1986)
- ———— (1989). "Hazards of butterfly collecting - Andamans, 1988". The Entomologist's Record and Journal of Variation. 101: 183–184. (Written on the Andaman islands 1988)
- ———— (1989). "Hazards of butterfly collecting - Morocco, 1979". The Entomologist's Record and Journal of Variation. 101: 259–260. (Written in London 1980)
- ———— (1989). "Hazards of butterfly collecting - Dhofar". The Entomologist's Record and Journal of Variation. 101: 106. (Written in New Delhi 1986)
- ———— (1989). "Hazards of butterfly collecting - Oman, May, 1981". The Entomologist's Record and Journal of Variation. 101: 83–84. (Written in India 1986)
- ———— (1989). "Hazards of butterfly collecting - Lebanon, 1973". The Entomologist's Record and Journal of Variation. 101: 232–233. (Written in London 1988)
- ———— (1990). "Hazards of butterfly collecting - Ecuador, 1987". The Entomologist's Record and Journal of Variation. 102: 86–87. (Written in Rwanda 1989)
- ———— (1990). "Hazards of butterfly collecting - Kenya, Kakamega, 1989". The Entomologist's Record and Journal of Variation. 102: 245–247. (Written in Botswana 1990)
- ———— (1990). "Hazards of butterfly collecting - Kenya, 1989". The Entomologist's Record and Journal of Variation. 102: 39–40. (Written in London 1988)
- ———— (1990). "Hazards of butterfly collecting - Iraq, 1972". The Entomologist's Record and Journal of Variation. 102: 293–294. (Written in London 1988).
- ———— (1990). "Hazards of butterfly collecting - Ecuador, 1987". The Entomologist's Record and Journal of Variation. 102: 180–181. (Written in Ethiopia 1989)
- ———— (1990). "Hazards of butterfly collecting - Yemen, Ibb 1981". The Entomologist's Record and Journal of Variation. 102: 141–142. (Written on Madagascar 1989)
- ———— (1991). "Hazards of butterfly collecting - Delhi, Thanatosis". The Entomologist's Record and Journal of Variation. 103: 268–269. (Written in Botswana 1991)
- ———— (1991). "Hazards of butterfly collecting - Samburu, Kenya". The Entomologist's Record and Journal of Variation. 103: 154–155. (Written in Ethiopia 1990)
- ———— (1991). "Hazards of butterfly collecting - Monarchs, Mexico". The Entomologist's Record and Journal of Variation. 103: 205–206. (Written in Botswana 1991)
- ———— (1991). "Hazards of butterfly collecting. Manaus, Brazil". The Entomologist's Record and Journal of Variation. 103: 322–323. (Written in Madrid 1989)
- ———— (1991). "Hazards of butterfly collecting - Agege, Nigeria". The Entomologist's Record and Journal of Variation. 103: 94–95. (Written in Lagos, Nigeria 1989)
- ———— (1991). "Hazards of butterfly collecting - Yemen, 1981". The Entomologist's Record and Journal of Variation. 103: 15–16. (Written in London 1989)
- ———— (1992). "Hazards of butterfly collecting. Andaman Islands". The Entomologist's Record and Journal of Variation. 104: 31–32. (Written in Botswana 1990)
- ———— (1992). "Hazards of butterfly collecting. Cedars of Lebanon". The Entomologist's Record and Journal of Variation. 104: 171–172.
- ———— (1992). "Hazards of butterfly collecting. Philippines". The Entomologist's Record and Journal of Variation. 104: 75–76. (Written in Belize 1990)
- ———— (1992). "Hazards of butterfly collecting. Papua New Guinea". The Entomologist's Record and Journal of Variation. 104: 155–156. (Written in Botswana 1990)
- ———— (1993). "Hazards of butterfly collecting - Bulgaria, 1976". The Entomologist's Record and Journal of Variation. 104: 319–321. (Written in London 1980)
- ———— (1993). "Hazards of butterfly collecting - monastic life in Lebanon". The Entomologist's Record and Journal of Variation. 105: 186–187. (Written in Gaborone 1991)
- ———— (1993). "Hazards of butterfly collecting - time for tea". The Entomologist's Record and Journal of Variation. 105: 83–85. (Written in London 1989)
- ———— (1993). "Hazards of butterfly collecting - the stationmaster and the butterflies". The Entomologist's Record and Journal of Variation. 105: 134–136. (Written in Nairobi Airport 1992)
- ———— (1993). "Hazards of butterfly collecting - cross-cultural differences on the Baiyer River, PNG". The Entomologist's Record and Journal of Variation. 105: 234–235. (Written in Copenhagen 1991)
- ———— (1993). "Hazards of butterfly collecting - good news for Queen Victoria". The Entomologist's Record and Journal of Variation. 105: 25–26. (Written in Gaborone 1990)
- ———— (1993). "Hazards of butterfly collecting - The magic of Tsodilo - Botswana". The Entomologist's Record and Journal of Variation. 105: 279–281. (Written in Gaborone 1992)
- ———— (1993). "Hazards of butterfly collecting - the tampan ticks of Gemsbok, Botswana, 1991". The Entomologist's Record and Journal of Variation. 106: 24–26. (Written in Gaborone 1991)
- ———— (1993). "Hazards of butterfly collecting - Spare that bouquet, Ethiopia, 1982" (PDF). Metamorphosis. 4: 186–187. (Written in London 1992)
- ———— (1994). "Hazards of butterfly collecting - Home James, please - Ghana, 1993". The Entomologist's Record and Journal of Variation. 106: 112–11. (Written at Newark and Sarasota viii.1993)
- ———— (1994). "Hazards of butterfly collecting - Looking for Papillons de Zaïre, October, 1989". The Entomologist's Record and Journal of Variation. 106: 244–246. (Written on KL 589, AMS-ACC 15.iv.94)
- ———— (1994). "Hazards of butterfly collecting - Egg-curry Orchha, India 1985". The Entomologist's Record and Journal of Variation. 106: 69–71.(Written in Botswana 1991)
- ———— (1994). "Hazards of butterfly collecting - relics of empire - India 1986". The Entomologist's Record and Journal of Variation. 106: 146–148.(Written in Dhaka 1996 and on Hotel de France - KQ 441, HRE-NBO 1991)
- ———— (1994). "Hazards of butterfly collecting - Driven out by drivers - Ghana, 1993" (PDF). Metamorphosis. 5: 36–37. (Written in Cape Coast iii.93)
- ———— (1995). "Hazards of butterfly collecting - A biogeographical anomaly, London 1994". The Entomologist's Record and Journal of Variation. 107: 95–98. (Written in Accra, April 1994).
- ———— (1995). "Hazards of butterfly collecting - from Rat Trap to Barbecue Bottom, Jamaica, February, 1994". The Entomologist's Record and Journal of Variation. 107: 150–152. (Written in Jamaica and Miami ii.1993)
- ———— (1995). "Hazards of butterfly collecting - Butterflies witness for Jehovah". The Entomologist's Record and Journal of Variation. 107: 249–251. (Written in London vi. 1995)
- ———— (1995). "Hazards of butterfly collecting - Stardom at last (India 1985)". The Entomologist's Record and Journal of Variation. 107: 305–306. (Written in Gaborone 1991)
- ———— (1995). "Hazards of butterfly collecting - Getting the shakes, London 1993". The Entomologist's Record and Journal of Variation. 107: 41–43. (Written in Accra 19.iv.1994)
- ———— (1995). "A first brush with science - Copenhagen, 1956". The Entomologist's Record and Journal of Variation. 107: 177–178. (Written in Gaborone 1991)
- ———— (1996). "Hazards of butterfly collecting - 'I am a tiny man,' United Kingdom, 1973". The Entomologist's Record and Journal of Variation. 108: 140–141. (Written in London xii.1992)
- ———— (1996). "Hazards of butterfly collecting - tracking down a Cymothoe - Oban Hills, Nigeria, 1995". The Entomologist's Record and Journal of Variation. 108: 291–292. (Written in London April 1996)
- ———— (1996). "Hazards of butterfly collecting - 'Secret Police' Syria, 1970". The Entomologist's Record and Journal of Variation. 108: 206–207. (Written in London 1992)
- ———— (1996). "Hazards of butterfly collecting - That wonderful family feeling, Ghana 1993". The Entomologist's Record and Journal of Variation. 108: 76–77. (Written in Cape Coast Ghana 18.iii.1993)
- ———— (1996). "Hazards of butterfly collecting - Tribal Life in Hermel, Lebanon, 1972". The Entomologist's Record and Journal of Variation. 108: 17–18. (Written in Gaborone 1992)
- ———— (1997). "Hazards of butterfly collecting - the lost sheep - Ghana, August, 1996". The Entomologist's Record and Journal of Variation. 109: 136–138. (Written in London 11.xii.1996)
- ———— (1997). "Hazards of butterfly collecting - Driven out by drivers - Ghana, 1993". The Entomologist's Record and Journal of Variation. 109: 243–244.
- ———— (1997). "Hazards of butterfly collecting - all in a day for Skypower". The Entomologist's Record and Journal of Variation. 109: 94–95.
- ———— (1997). "Hazards of butterfly collecting - Last flight to Natitingou, Bénin, 1978". The Entomologist's Record and Journal of Variation. 109: 298–300. (Written in Abidjan Airport 1996)
- ———— (1997). "Hazards of butterfly collecting - vanishing Papilio zalmoxis, Oban Hills, Nigeria, March 1995". The Entomologist's Record and Journal of Variation. 109: 40–41. (Written in Bangladesh May 1995)
- ———— (1997). "Hazards of butterfly collecting - Christian Cat goes camping. Botswana 1991". The Entomologist's Record and Journal of Variation. 108: 206–207. (Written in London ii.1996)
- ———— (1998). "Indian Agricultural Research Institute (IARI), New Delhi 1986". The Entomologist's Record and Journal of Variation. 110: 285–286. (Written in Bangladesh May 1995)
- ———— (1998). "Hazards of butterfly collecting - Trekking out of Mkpot1, Cross River, Nigeria - March, 1995". The Entomologist's Record and Journal of Variation. 110: 68–69. (Written in London 1997)
- ———— (1998). "Hazards of butterfly collecting - Trekking into Mkpot1, Cross River, Nigeria - March, 1995". The Entomologist's Record and Journal of Variation. 110: 24–26. (Written in Dhaka April 1995)
- ———— (1998). "Hazards of butterfly collecting – Kwesi's parrot, Cape Coast, Ghana, January 1995". The Entomologist's Record and Journal of Variation. 110: 240–241. (Written in Abidjan Airport 31.i.96)
- ———— (1998). "Hazards of butterfly collecting - Wandering in Africa, Cameroun Feb. 1997". The Entomologist's Record and Journal of Variation. 110: 169–170. (Written 12.ii.1997 in the Western Hotel, Kumba, Cameroun while waiting for a vehicle gone missing).
- ———— (1998). "Hazards of butterfly collecting - You don't want to see my mudflies". The Entomologist's Record and Journal of Variation. 111: 42–43. (Written in Manila April 1997)
- ———— (1999). "Hazards of butterfly collecting - Schevy, West Africa 1993-1998". The Entomologist's Record and Journal of Variation. 111: 69–70. (Written in London 30 ix 1998)
- ———— (1999). "Hazards of butterfly collecting - The finest bridge in Afghanistan". The Entomologist's Record and Journal of Variation. 111: 146–147. (Written in Bangladesh v.1999)
- ———— (1999). "Hazards of butterfly collecting - Fax for you, Sir. Korup National Park". The Entomologist's Record and Journal of Variation. 111: 284–285.
- ———— (1999). "Hazards of butterfly collecting - The birth of an entomologist". The Entomologist's Record and Journal of Variation. 111: 242–244. (Written in Manila, June 1999)
- ———— (1999). "Hazards of butterfly collecting – A bad day in Oyster Bay, Tanzania 1977". The Entomologist's Record and Journal of Variation. 111: 193–194. (Written in Bangladesh iii 1999)
- ———— (2000). "Hazards of butterfly collecting – What is Brephidium exile doing in the Emirates?". The Entomologist's Record and Journal of Variation. 112: 217–218. (Written in Manila June 2000)
- ———— (2000). "Hazards of butterfly collecting – chasing Papilio parsimon, London, 1999". The Entomologist's Record and Journal of Variation. 112: 167–168. (Written in Manila January 2000)
- ———— (2000). "Hazards of butterfly collecting – The non-turbulent priest, Ghana 1996". The Entomologist's Record and Journal of Variation. 112: 89–90. (Written in Manila June 1999)
- ———— (2000). "Hazards of butterfly collecting – Visiting the Flemings, Malaysia 1975". The Entomologist's Record and Journal of Variation. 112: 135–137. (Written in Malaysia 1999)
- ———— (2000). "Hazards of butterfly collecting – Anybody there? Botswana 1992". The Entomologist's Record and Journal of Variation. 112: 21–22. (Written in Manila May 1999)
- ———— (2000). "Hazards of butterfly collecting – juche in Burkina Faso, February 1988". The Entomologist's Record and Journal of Variation. 112: 217–218. (Written in Manila June 2000)
- ———— (2000). "Hazards of butterfly collecting – Round-eye taxi driver, Korea 1978". The Entomologist's Record and Journal of Variation. 113: 24–25.
- ———— (2001). "Hazards of butterfly collecting – A military escort will be needed, Oman 1979". The Entomologist's Record and Journal of Variation. 113: 138–139. (Written in Dhaka iii.2001)
- ———— (2001). "Hazards of butterfly collecting – Ornipholidotos larseni, Nigeria 1967-1969". The Entomologist's Record and Journal of Variation. 113: 80–81. (Written in Manila Jan 2001)
- ———— (2001). "Hazards of butterfly collecting – A very Scandinavian picnic – New Delhi, Jan. 1955". The Entomologist's Record and Journal of Variation. 113: 282–284. (Written in Bangladesh iii 2001)
- ———— (2001). "Hazards of butterfly collecting - We are going to kill you, Sir. Benin, Nigeria, 1969". The Entomologist's Record and Journal of Variation. 113: 235–236. (Written in Dhaka, iii 2001)
- ———— (2001). "Hazards of butterfly collecting – Airport Hotel, Lagos – Nigeria 1978/80". The Entomologist's Record and Journal of Variation. 113: 175–176. (Written in Dhaka 23 iii 2001)
- ———— (2002). "Hazards of butterfly collecting – The most dangerous hazard of butterfly collecting - Bangladesh, 2002". The Entomologist's Record and Journal of Variation. 114: 207–209. (Written in Dhaka 2002)
- ———— (2002). "Hazards of butterfly collecting - Seasonal variation in the Common Evening Brown - Bangladesh, 2001". The Entomologist's Record and Journal of Variation. 114: 176–177. (Written in Dhaka, Bangladesh June 2002)
- ———— (2002). "Hazards of butterfly collecting – The 'best' butterfly day of my life". The Entomologist's Record and Journal of Variation. 114: 82–83. (Written in Dhaka May 2001)
- ———— (2002). "Hazards of butterfly collecting – 'Boys' Own' scientists on the Musandam Peninsula, Oman, 1979". The Entomologist's Record and Journal of Variation. 114: 135–136. (Written in Dhaka 2001)
- ———— (2002). "Hazards of butterfly collecting – Hunting for Allancastria, Lebanon 1972". The Entomologist's Record and Journal of Variation. 114: 33–34. (Written in Dhaka 2001)
- ———— (2003). "Hazards of butterfly collecting – Of caterpillars, snakes, and monkeys – Nilgiris, India". The Entomologist's Record and Journal of Variation. 115: 43–44. (Written in Bangkok Hospital viii 2002)
- ———— (2003). "Hazards of butterfly collecting – what is in the pot? (Ghana 1993)". The Entomologist's Record and Journal of Variation. 115: 243–246. (Written in Hanoi, August 2003)
- ———— (2003). "Hazards of butterfly collecting – butterflies and noodle soup (Thailand 2002)". The Entomologist's Record and Journal of Variation. 115: 274–275. (Written in hospital in Bangkok, August 2002)
- ———— (2003). "Hazards of butterfly collecting – Butterflies at boarding school, Denmark 1958-1962". The Entomologist's Record and Journal of Variation. 115: 74–76. (Written in Bangladesh September 2002)
- ———— (2003). "Hazards of butterfly collecting – getting back was the real problem (Andamans, 1988)". The Entomologist's Record and Journal of Variation. 115: 144–143. (Written in Dhaka, iii.2001)
- ———— (2003). "Hazards of butterfly collecting – Hoo, hoo, hoo, and you too (Bangladesh 2002)". The Entomologist's Record and Journal of Variation. 115: 175–176. (Written in Bangladesh June 2002)
- ———— (2003). "Hazards of butterfly collecting – rendezvous in Algeciras – Morocco/Spain 1968". The Entomologist's Record and Journal of Variation. 116: 68–69. (written in Hanoi, August 2003)
- ———— (2003). "Hazards of butterfly collecting – Good for a rainy day – Sa Pa, Vietnam, September 2003". The Entomologist's Record and Journal of Variation. 116: 128–129.
- ———— (2003). "Rap in Ghana – October, 2003". The Entomologist's Record and Journal of Variation. 116: 215–217. (written Hanoi 2003)
- ———— (2004). "Hazards of butterfly collecting – Pity poor buddha – South India, September 1986". The Entomologist's Record and Journal of Variation. 116: 260–261. (Written in Bangladesh September 2002)
- ———— (2004). "Hazards of butterfly collecting – Margrethe – chamaeleon extraordinaire, Botswana 1991". The Entomologist's Record and Journal of Variation. 116: 148–14. (Written in London, June 2003)
- ———— (2004). "Hazards of butterfly collecting – rape on Corregidor Island, Philippines 2000". The Entomologist's Record and Journal of Variation. 116: 41–42. (Written in Dhaka, March 2003)
- ———— (2005). "ABD in the Sunderban mangroves – x-mas 2002". The Entomologist's Record and Journal of Variation. 117: 39–42. (written in London, June 2003)
- ———— (2005). "Hazards of butterfly collecting – London and Florida, 1993. Father Theodor Maessen". The Entomologist's Record and Journal of Variation. 117: 77–78.
- ———— (2005). "Hazards of butterfly collecting – Fossil on a pin, UK". The Entomologist's Record and Journal of Variation. 117: 109–111. (written in Hanoi, iii.2005)
- ———— (2005). "Hazards of butterfly collecting – "Some sticks have fallen over the road" – Omo Forest, Nigeria, June 1967". The Entomologist's Record and Journal of Variation. 117: 171–173. (Hanoi v.2004)
- ———— (2005). "Hazards of butterfly collecting – Far-off places, strange foods". The Entomologist's Record and Journal of Variation. 117: 194–196.
- ———— (2006). "Hazards of butterfly collecting – butterflies & surgical contraception – Yemen 1980". The Entomologist's Record and Journal of Variation. 118: 85–87. (written Hanoi 26.iv.2005)
- ———— (2006). "Hazards of butterfly collecting – Smørebrødsmellemlægspapir". The Entomologist's Record and Journal of Variation. 118: 135–136. (written in Copenhagen 9.iv.2006)
- ———— (2006). "Hazards of butterfly collecting – From the Nilgiri to the Biligiriranga Mountains – South India, 1986". The Entomologist's Record and Journal of Variation. 118: 185–18.
- ———— (2006). "Hazards of butterfly collecting – Butterflies of Egypt, 1970-1987". The Entomologist's Record and Journal of Variation. 118: 219–221. (written in Hanoi, iv.2005)
- ———— (2006). "Hazards of butterfly collecting – Exploding Acraea butterflies, Africa 1987 - 2005". The Entomologist's Record and Journal of Variation. 118: 34–36.
