= Xenia =

Xenia may refer to:

== People ==
- Xenia (name), a feminine given name; includes a list of people with this name

== Places ==
=== United States ===
listed alphabetically by state

- Xenia, Illinois, a village in Clay County
  - Xenia Township, Clay County, Illinois
- Xenia, Illinois, a city in Logan County now known as Atlanta
- Xenia, Indiana, a town in Miami County now known as Converse
- Xenia, Dallas County, Iowa, an unincorporated community
- Xenia, Hardin County, Iowa, an unincorporated community
- Xenia, Kansas, an unincorporated community in Bourbon County
- Xenia, Missouri, an extinct community
- Xenia, Ohio, a city in Greene County
  - Xenia Township, Greene County, Ohio

=== Elsewhere ===
- Xenia Hill, in the South Shetland Islands, Antarctica

== Hospitality ==
- Xenia (Greek), the ancient Greek concept of hospitality, translated as "guest-friendship"
  - Xenia motif, the representation of a host's generosity to his guests
- Xenia (hotel), a now-defunct chain of state-owned hotels in Greece
- Xenia Hotels & Resorts, an Orlando-based hotel company

== Nature ==
- Xenia (coral), a genus of coral
- Xenia (plants), pollen effects on seeds and fruits
- Hypolycaena xenia, a species of butterfly
- Paratephritis xenia, a species of fruit flies
- Phyllocnistis xenia, a species of moth

== Vehicles ==
- Xenia (automobile), an American car
- Daihatsu Xenia or Toyota Avanza, a multi-purpose vehicle
- USS Xenia (AKA-51), an Artemis-class attack transport

== Other uses ==
- 625 Xenia, an asteroid
- Xenia (band), a former Yugoslav band
- Xenia College, defunct institution in Xenia, Ohio, U.S.
- Xenia (crater), a crater on Venus
- Xenia (film), a 2014 Greek film
- Xenia, a book of epigrams by Martial intended to accompany gifts
- Xenia Orchidacea, a book in three volumes published 1858–1900, by Heinrich Gustav Reichenbach & Friedrich Wilhelm Ludwig Kraenzlin

== See also ==
- Xenia tornado (disambiguation)
- Xenien
- Xena (disambiguation)
- Zinnia (disambiguation)
