= Hypolycaena lochmophila =

Scientific classification
- Kingdom: Animalia
- Phylum: Arthropoda
- Clade: Pancrustacea
- Class: Insecta
- Order: Lepidoptera
- Family: Lycaenidae
- Genus: Hypolycaena
- Species: H. lochmophila

Binomial name
- Hypolycaena lochmophila Tite, 1967

Species of butterfly

Hypolycaena lochmophila, the coastal hairstreak, is a butterfly of the family Lycaenidae. It is found in lowland forest in northern KwaZulu-Natal, Malawi (Mlanje and Zomba) and eastern Zimbabwe.

The wingspan is 22–28 mm for males and 23.5–31 mm for females. Adults are on wing year round with peaks in November and March or April.

The larvae feed on Deinbollia oblongifolia.
