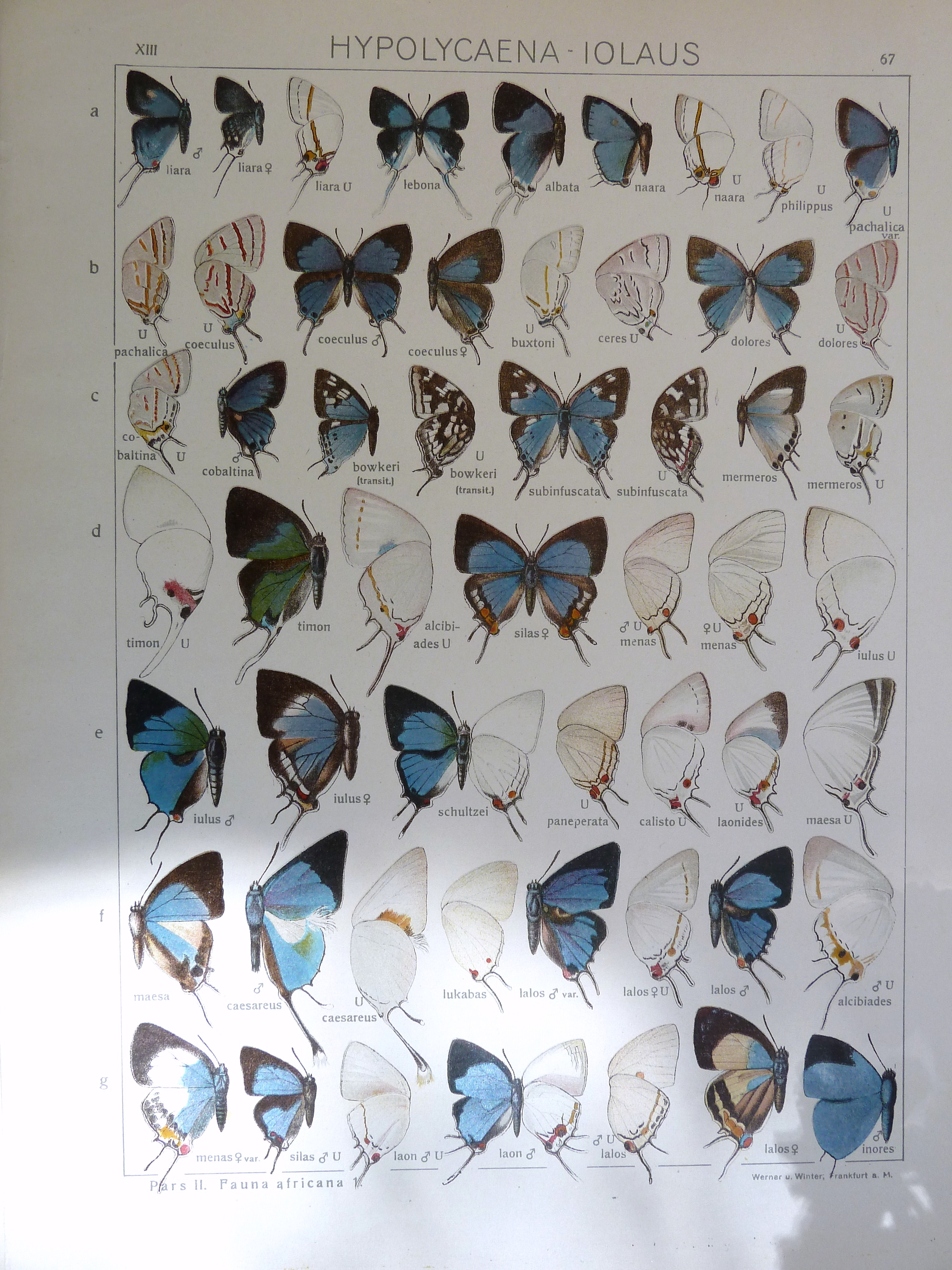
- Seitz Fauna Africana Taf 67 (line b)

Scientific classification
- Kingdom: Animalia
- Phylum: Arthropoda
- Clade: Pancrustacea
- Class: Insecta
- Order: Lepidoptera
- Family: Lycaenidae
- Genus: Hypolycaena
- Species: H. buxtoni

Binomial name
- Hypolycaena buxtoni Hewitson, 1874

Synonyms
- Hypolycaena seamani Trimen, 1874; Hypolycaena buxtoni f. rogersi Bethune-Baker, 1924; Hypolycaena buxtoni f. divisa Talbot, 1935

= Hypolycaena buxtoni =

Species of butterfly

Hypolycaena buxtoni, the Buxton's hairstreak, is a butterfly of the family Lycaenidae. It is found in southern Africa.

The wingspan is 25–30 mm for males and 28–33 mm for females. Adults are on wing from September to May (with a peak in October and November) and from February to May (with a peak in March and April). There are two generations per year.

The larvae feed on Tricalysia and Pavetta species and possibly Tarenna pavettoides.

== Subspecies ==
- Hypolycaena buxtoni buxtoni (Cape, KwaZulu-Natal, Zimbabwe, Malawi)
- Hypolycaena buxtoni rogersi Bethune-Baker, 1924 (the coast of eastern Kenya and eastern Tanzania)
- Hypolycaena buxtoni spurcus Talbot, 1929 (Zambia, southern Zaire (Shaba), south-western Tanzania)
