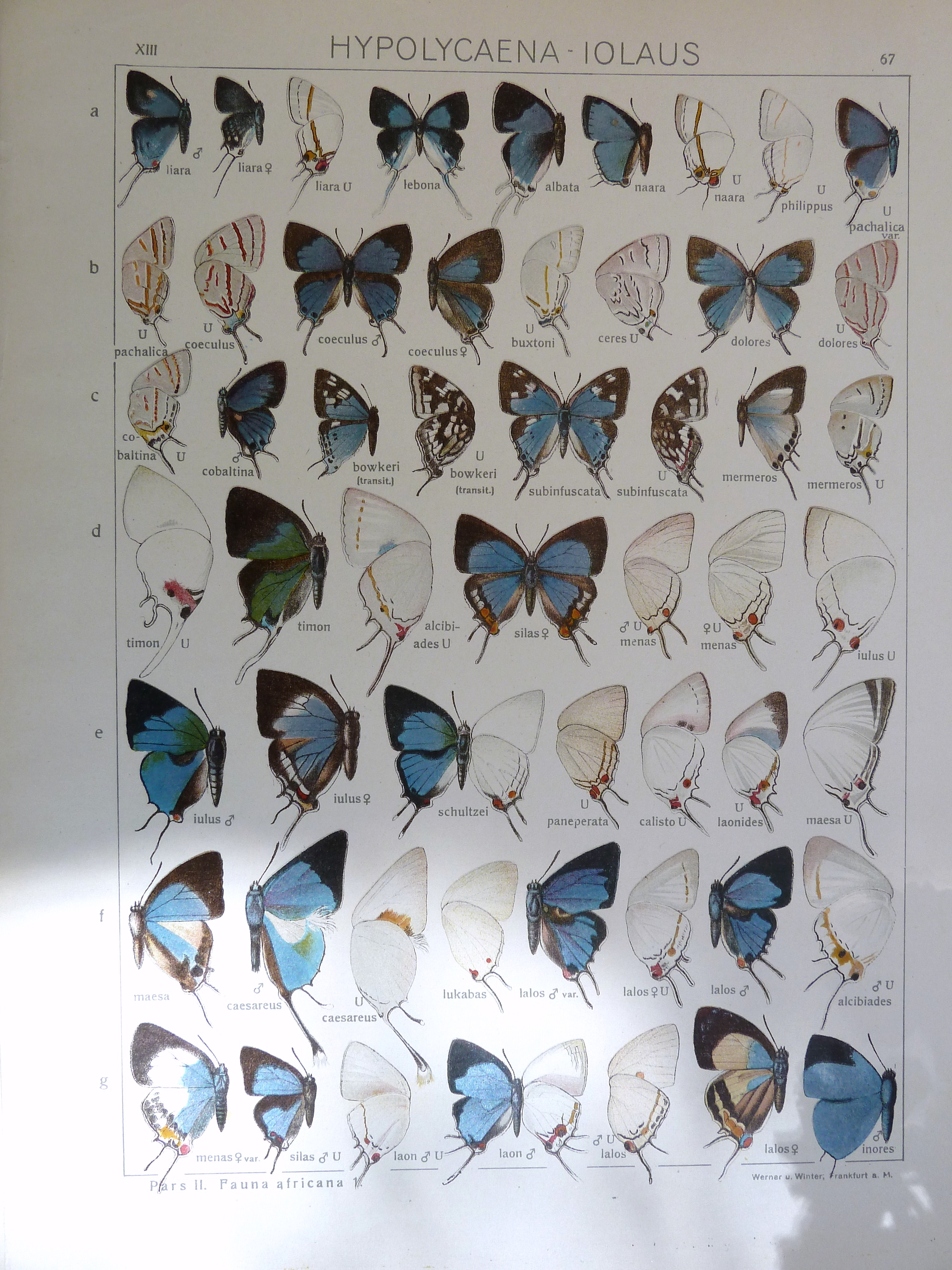
- Seitz Fauna AfricanaTaf 67 (line a)

Scientific classification
- Kingdom: Animalia
- Phylum: Arthropoda
- Clade: Pancrustacea
- Class: Insecta
- Order: Lepidoptera
- Family: Lycaenidae
- Genus: Hypolycaena
- Species: H. liara

Binomial name
- Hypolycaena liara H. H. Druce, 1890

Synonyms
- Hypolycaena symmacha Hulstaert, 1924; Hypolycaena bitjeana Bethune-Baker, 1926

= Hypolycaena liara =

Species of butterfly

Hypolycaena liara, the black-patch hairstreak, is a butterfly in the family Lycaenidae. The species was first described by Hamilton Herbert Druce in 1890. It is found in Guinea, Liberia, Ivory Coast, Ghana, Togo, Nigeria, Cameroon, Equatorial Guinea, the Democratic Republic of the Congo, Sudan, Uganda, Somalia, Kenya, Tanzania and Zambia. The habitat consists of forests and secondary growth.

The larvae feed on Vitex species.

== Subspecies ==
- Hypolycaena liara liara (eastern Guinea, Liberia, Ivory Coast, Ghana, Togo, Nigeria: south and the Cross River loop, Cameroon, Equatorial Guinea: Bioko, southern Sudan, Uganda, Somalia, western Kenya, north-western Tanzania, Democratic Republic of the Congo: Mongala, Uele, Kivu, Tshopo, Kinshasa, Sankuru, Lomani, Lualuba and Tanganika)
- Hypolycaena liara plana Talbot, 1935 (Democratic Republic of the Congo: Shaba, south-western Tanzania, Zambia: Lusaka and northwards)

Torben Larsen developed a species numbering system for his 2005 publication Butterflies of West Africa. The nominate subspecies is #445. The 'Larsen' numbers have since been used with permission in A Sharp Eye on Butterflies of Ghana.
