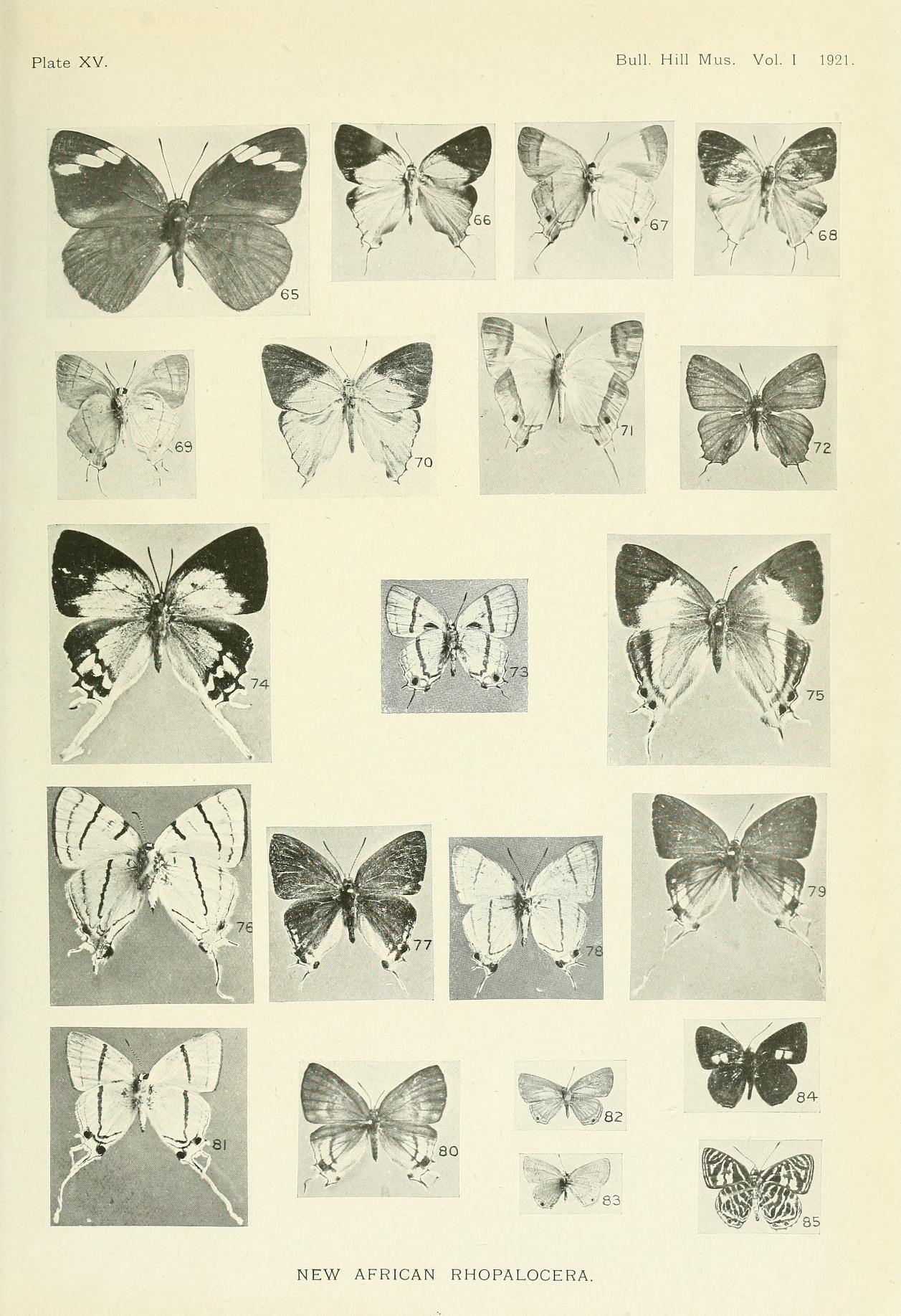
- Figs 75, 76 as Hypolycaena buxtoni puella

Scientific classification
- Kingdom: Animalia
- Phylum: Arthropoda
- Clade: Pancrustacea
- Class: Insecta
- Order: Lepidoptera
- Family: Lycaenidae
- Genus: Hypolycaena
- Species: H. kadiskos

Binomial name
- Hypolycaena kadiskos H. H. Druce, 1890

Synonyms
- Hypolycaena buxtoni puella Joicey and Talbot, 1921

= Hypolycaena kadiskos =

Species of butterfly

Hypolycaena kadiskos, the scarce hairstreak, is a butterfly in the family Lycaenidae. The species was first described by Hamilton Herbert Druce in 1890. It is found in Ghana, southern Nigeria, Cameroon, Uganda and north-western Tanzania. The habitat consists of forests.
