= Hypolycaena jacksoni =

Scientific classification
- Kingdom: Animalia
- Phylum: Arthropoda
- Clade: Pancrustacea
- Class: Insecta
- Order: Lepidoptera
- Family: Lycaenidae
- Genus: Hypolycaena
- Species: H. jacksoni

Binomial name
- Hypolycaena jacksoni Bethune-Baker, 1906

Synonyms
- Hypolycaena buxtoni puella Joicey and Talbot, 1921

Species of butterfly

Hypolycaena jacksoni is a butterfly in the family Lycaenidae. It is found in western Uganda, the Democratic Republic of the Congo (Kivu, Kisaba and Ruwenzori), Rwanda and Burundi.

== Description ==
H. jacksoni B.-Bak. (68 c) is only known in the male and differs from all the other species [of Hypolaecena by the colouring. Wings above dull orange-red in a certain light with a faint purple reflection; forewing with a very broad marginal band; hindwing with a rather broad dark marginal band quickly tapering off towards the anal angle; anal angle bluish white, anal lobe margined with yellow; first small tail long, the second small tail shorter. Both wings beneath as far as the margin purely white; forewing with a slanting, orange-red transverse streak from the costal margin to the base of vein 2 and a postmedian, slanting, undulate, orange-red transverse band ending at vein 1; a fine, slightly bent, dark submarginal line. Hindwing with an orange-red, short basal spot in area 7, a slanting, orange-red transverse streak as far as vein 2 behind which it is continued as a black line, and a fine, feebly dentate discal line turning posteriorly towards the proximal margin; a black dot proximally bordered with yellow in 2, the spot in 1 b black narrowly bordered with yellow, and a light, metallic blue spot nearer to the margin; marginal line finely black. Uganda: Toro. .
