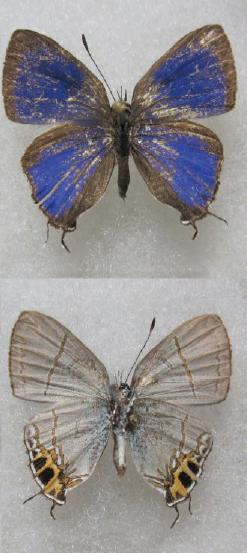
- Male
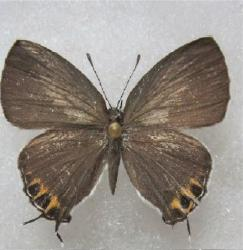
- Female

Scientific classification
- Kingdom: Animalia
- Phylum: Arthropoda
- Clade: Pancrustacea
- Class: Insecta
- Order: Lepidoptera
- Family: Lycaenidae
- Genus: Hypolycaena
- Species: H. toshikoae

Binomial name
- Hypolycaena toshikoae H. Hayashi, 1984

= Hypolycaena toshikoae =

Species of butterfly

Hypolycaena toshikoae is a butterfly of the family Lycaenidae first described by Hisakazu Hayashi in 1984. Forewing length: 10–13 mm. It is endemic to the islands of Luzon and Mindoro in the Philippines. On Mount Halcon of Mindoro island, the male is not rare but the female is very rare.

Etymology. The specific name is dedicated to Mrs Toshiko HAYASHI, the mother of the author.
