= Paratephritis =

Scientific classification
- Kingdom: Animalia
- Phylum: Arthropoda
- Class: Insecta
- Order: Diptera
- Family: Tephritidae
- Subfamily: Tephritinae
- Tribe: Tephritini
- Genus: Paratephritis; Shiraki, 1933

Type species
- Paratephritis fukaii Shiraki, 1933

Synonyms
- Tephritoedaspis Rohdendorf, 1934

Genus of flies

Paratephritis is a genus of tephritid or fruit flies in the family Tephritidae.

== Species ==
- Paratephritis abstractus Munro, 1935
- Paratephritis formosensis Shiraki, 1933
- Paratephritis fukaii Shiraki, 1933
- Paratephritis incomposita Munro, 1957
- Paratephritis karura Munro, 1957
- Paratephritis takeuchii Ito, 1949
- Paratephritis transitoria (Rohdendorf, 1934)
- Paratephritis umbrifera Munro, 1957
- Paratephritis unifasciata Chen, 1938
- Paratephritis vitreifasciata (Hering, 1938)
- Paratephritis xenia Hering, 1938
