= Hypolycaena clenchi =

Scientific classification
- Kingdom: Animalia
- Phylum: Arthropoda
- Clade: Pancrustacea
- Class: Insecta
- Order: Lepidoptera
- Family: Lycaenidae
- Genus: Hypolycaena
- Species: H. clenchi

Binomial name
- Hypolycaena clenchi Larsen, 1997

Species of butterfly

Hypolycaena clenchi, or Clench's fairy hairstreak, is a butterfly in the family Lycaenidae. It is found in Sierra Leone, Liberia, Ivory Coast, Ghana and possibly Cameroon, the Republic of the Congo and Equatorial Guinea. The habitat consists of forests.
