= Hypolycaena tearei =

Scientific classification
- Kingdom: Animalia
- Phylum: Arthropoda
- Clade: Pancrustacea
- Class: Insecta
- Order: Lepidoptera
- Family: Lycaenidae
- Genus: Hypolycaena
- Species: H. tearei

Binomial name
- Hypolycaena tearei Henning, 1981

Species of butterfly

Hypolycaena tearei, the Teare's hairstreak, is a butterfly in the family Lycaenidae. It was described by Graham Allan Henning in 1981. It is found in Mozambique and Zimbabwe.

Adults are on wing during the warmer months of the year, with peaks in February and March.
