= Hypolycaena obscura =

Scientific classification
- Kingdom: Animalia
- Phylum: Arthropoda
- Clade: Pancrustacea
- Class: Insecta
- Order: Lepidoptera
- Family: Lycaenidae
- Genus: Hypolycaena
- Species: H. obscura

Binomial name
- Hypolycaena obscura Stempffer, 1947

Synonyms
- Hypolycaena liara f. obscura Stempffer, 1947

Species of butterfly

Hypolycaena obscura is a butterfly in the family Lycaenidae. It is found in Sudan, Uganda, Kenya and western Tanzania.
