= Hypolycaena coerulea =

Scientific classification
- Kingdom: Animalia
- Phylum: Arthropoda
- Clade: Pancrustacea
- Class: Insecta
- Order: Lepidoptera
- Family: Lycaenidae
- Genus: Hypolycaena
- Species: H. coerulea

Binomial name
- Hypolycaena coerulea Aurivillius, 1895

Synonyms
- Hypolycaena lebona var. coerulea Aurivillius, 1895; Hypolycaena lebona coerulea

Species of butterfly

Hypolycaena coerulea, the shining fairy hairstreak, is a butterfly in the family Lycaenidae. It is found in Nigeria (the Niger Delta, the eastern part of the country and the Cross River loop) and western Cameroon. The habitat consists of primary forests.
