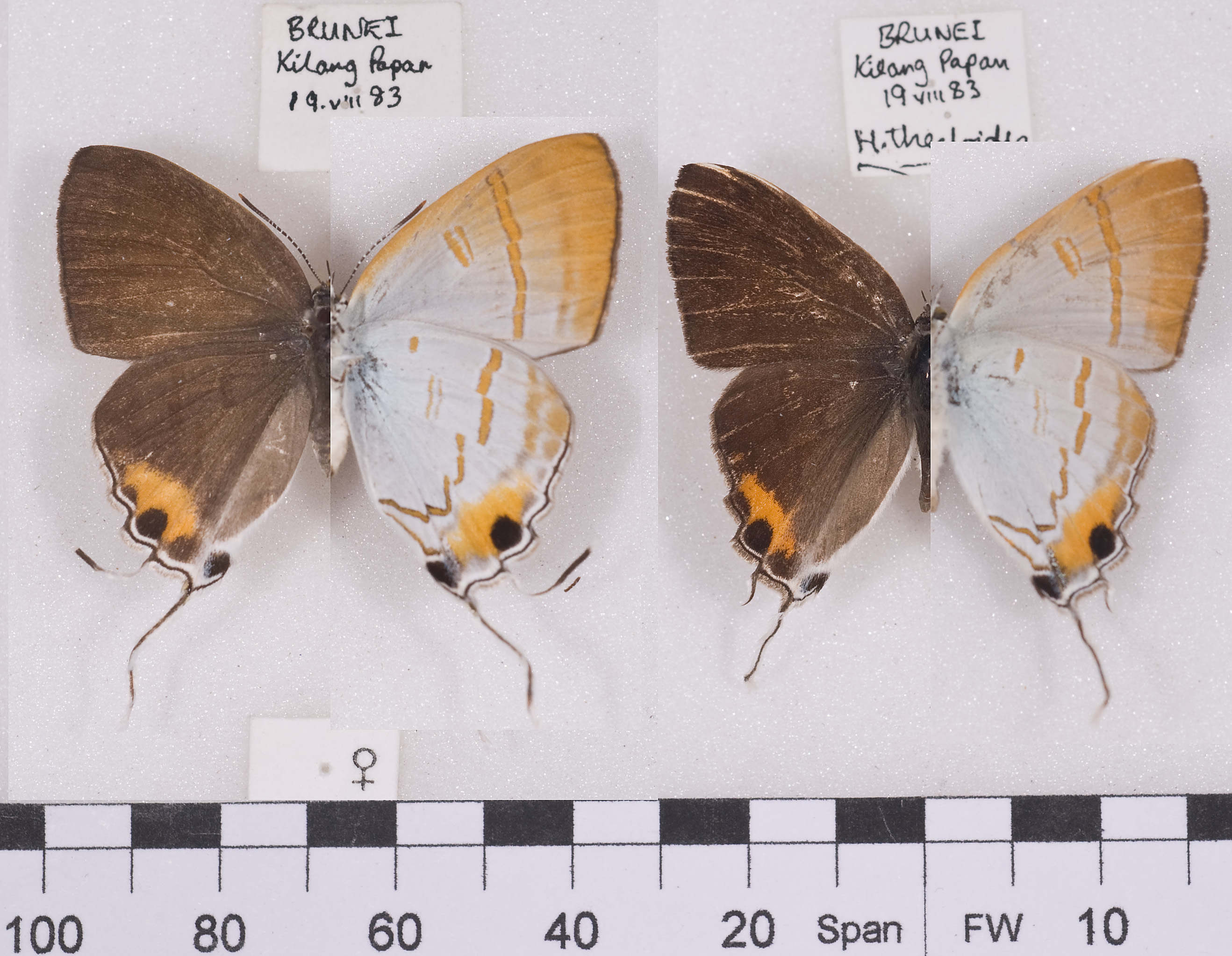

Scientific classification
- Kingdom: Animalia
- Phylum: Arthropoda
- Clade: Pancrustacea
- Class: Insecta
- Order: Lepidoptera
- Family: Lycaenidae
- Genus: Hypolycaena
- Species: H. thecloides

Binomial name
- Hypolycaena thecloides (C. Felder & R. Felder, 1860)

= Hypolycaena thecloides =

Brown tit

Species of butterfly

Hypolycaena thecloides, the brown tit, is a small but striking butterfly found in India and South-East Asia that belongs to the lycaenids or blues family. The species was first described by Cajetan Felder and Rudolf Felder in 1860.

The upperside ground colour is brown. The hindwing has two pairs of tails and black-spotted orange tornal area. The greyish-white underside has orange brown post-discal bands, and the apical area is shaded orange. It is found in Borneo, Sumatra, Java, Nicobars, Burma, Peninsular Malaya, Singapore, Malaya and the Philippines.

== See also ==
- List of butterflies of India
- List of butterflies of India (Lycaenidae)
