= Paratephritis takeuchii =

Scientific classification
- Kingdom: Animalia
- Phylum: Arthropoda
- Class: Insecta
- Order: Diptera
- Family: Tephritidae
- Subfamily: Tephritinae
- Tribe: Tephritini
- Genus: Paratephritis
- Species: P. takeuchii

Binomial name
- Paratephritis takeuchii Ito, 1949

Species of fly

Paratephritis takeuchii is a species of tephritid or fruit flies in the genus Paratephritis of the family Tephritidae. It is endemic to Japan.
