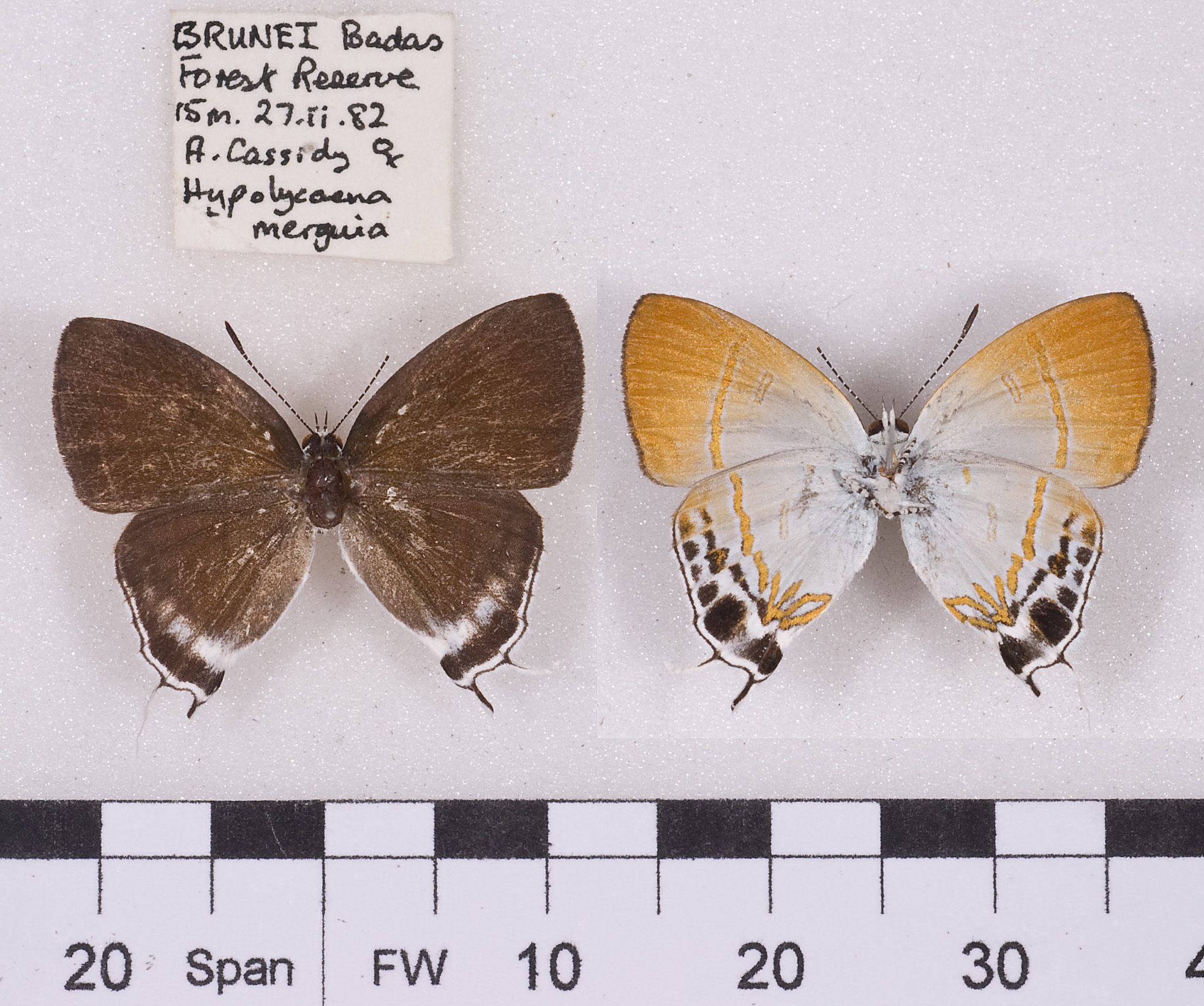
- Hypolycaena amabilis phemis, female

Scientific classification
- Kingdom: Animalia
- Phylum: Arthropoda
- Clade: Pancrustacea
- Class: Insecta
- Order: Lepidoptera
- Family: Lycaenidae
- Genus: Hypolycaena
- Species: H. phemis

Binomial name
- Hypolycaena phemis H. H. Druce, 1895

Synonyms
- Hypolycaena amabilis phemis Druce, 1895

= Hypolycaena phemis =

Species of butterfly

Hypolycaena phemis is a butterfly in the family Lycaenidae. It was described by Hamilton Herbert Druce in 1895. It is found on Borneo.
