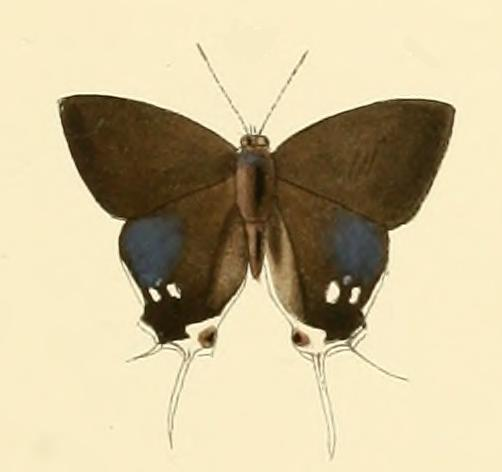

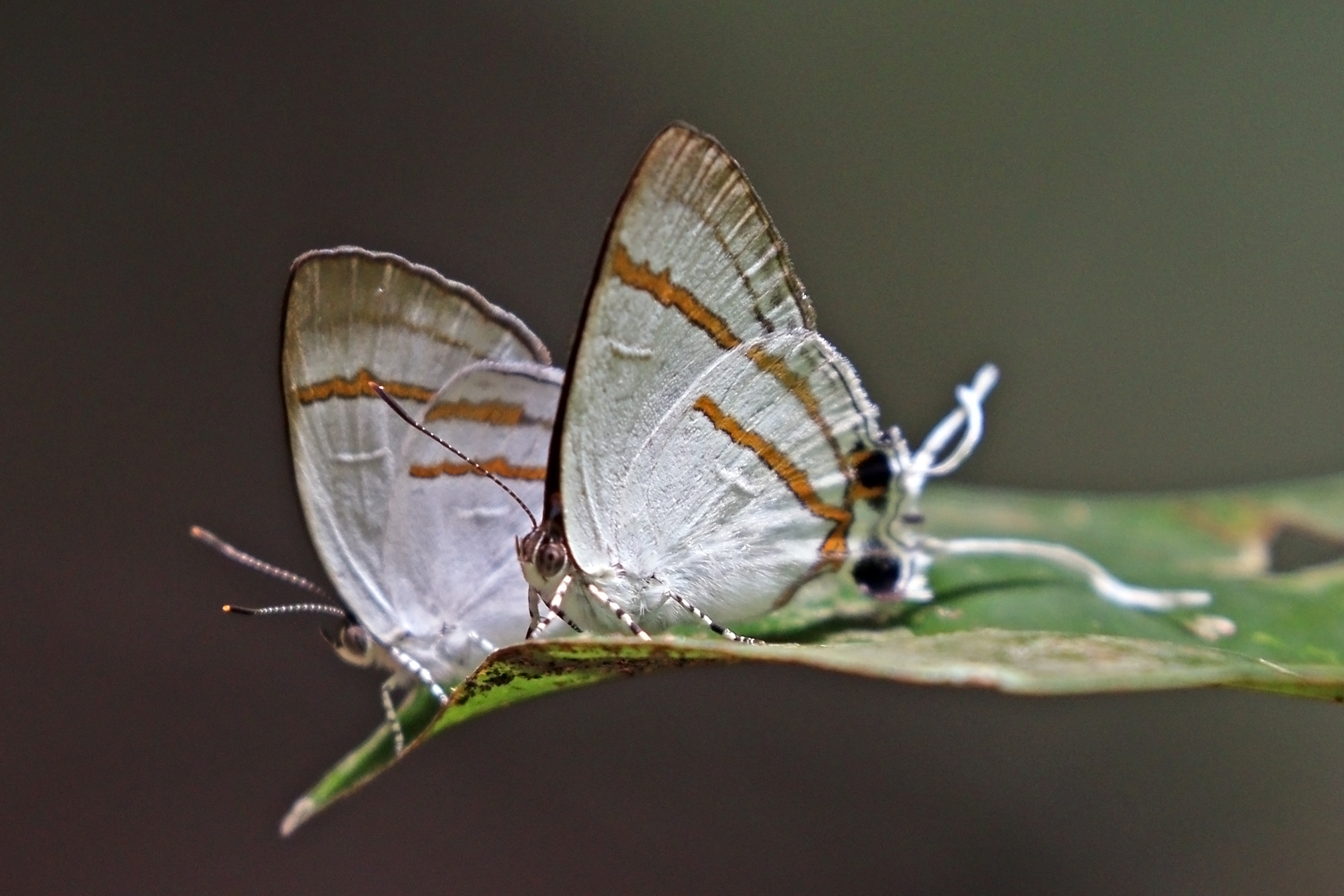
- H. h. hatita Kakum National Park, Ghana

Scientific classification
- Kingdom: Animalia
- Phylum: Arthropoda
- Clade: Pancrustacea
- Class: Insecta
- Order: Lepidoptera
- Family: Lycaenidae
- Genus: Hypolycaena
- Species: H. hatita

Binomial name
- Hypolycaena hatita Hewitson, 1865

Synonyms
- Hypolycaena japhusa Riley, 1921; Hypolycaena ugandae Sharpe, 1904

= Hypolycaena hatita =

Common fairy hairstreak

Species of butterfly

Hypolycaena hatita, the common fairy hairstreak, is a butterfly in the family Lycaenidae. It is found in Guinea, Sierra Leone, Liberia, Ivory Coast, Ghana, Togo, Nigeria, Cameroon, Gabon, the Republic of the Congo, the Democratic Republic of the Congo, Ethiopia, Uganda, Kenya, Tanzania, Malawi and Zambia. The habitat consists of primary forests and dense secondary growth.

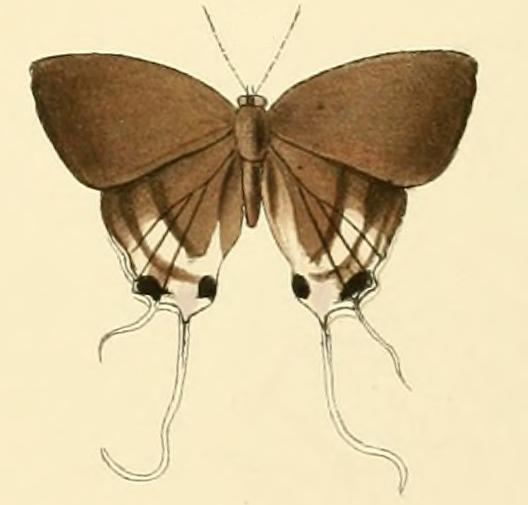

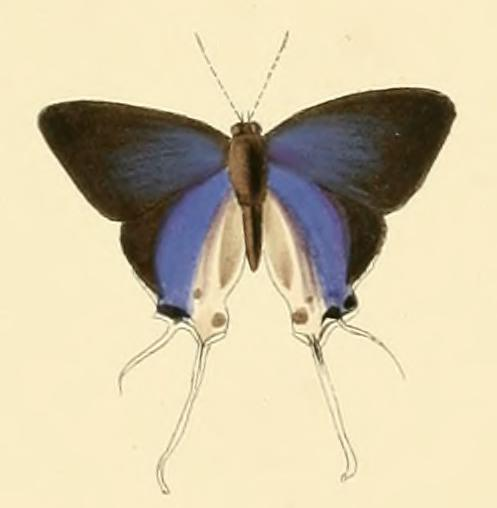

Adult males have been recorded feeding from bird droppings and are occasionally seen mud-puddling.

The larvae feed on Syzygium species.

== Subspecies ==
- Hypolycaena hatita hatita — Guinea, Sierra Leone, Liberia, Ivory Coast, Ghana, Togo, Nigeria: south and the Cross River loop, Cameroon, Gabon, Congo, Democratic Republic of Congo: Mongala, Uele, Ituri, Tshopo, Tshuapa, Kinshasa, Cataractes, Bas-Fleuve, Sankuru and Maniema
- Hypolycaena hatita japhusa Riley, 1921 — western Tanzania, Malawi, Zambia: from the Copperbelt northwards, Democratic Republic of Congo: Shaba
- Hypolycaena hatita ugandae Sharpe, 1904 — Uganda, western Kenya, north-western Tanzania, Democratic Republic of Congo: Lualaba, Lomani and Kivu
