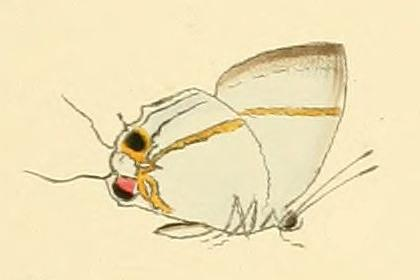

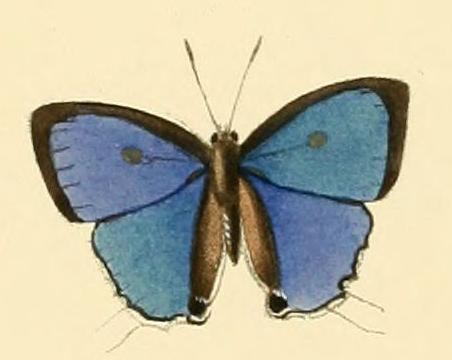

Scientific classification
- Kingdom: Animalia
- Phylum: Arthropoda
- Clade: Pancrustacea
- Class: Insecta
- Order: Lepidoptera
- Family: Lycaenidae
- Genus: Hypolycaena
- Species: H. naara

Binomial name
- Hypolycaena naara Hewitson, 1873

= Hypolycaena naara =

Species of butterfly

Hypolycaena naara is a butterfly in the family Lycaenidae. It is found in Cameroon, Gabon, the Republic of the Congo, Angola and the Democratic Republic of the Congo (Kisangani).
