= Hypolycaena amanica =

Scientific classification
- Kingdom: Animalia
- Phylum: Arthropoda
- Clade: Pancrustacea
- Class: Insecta
- Order: Lepidoptera
- Family: Lycaenidae
- Genus: Hypolycaena
- Species: H. amanica

Binomial name
- Hypolycaena amanica Stempffer, 1951

Species of butterfly

Hypolycaena amanica is a butterfly in the family Lycaenidae. It is found in Tanzania (the north-eastern part of the country, as well as the Usambara and Ulunguru mountains).
