= Hypolycaena narada =

Scientific classification
- Kingdom: Animalia
- Phylum: Arthropoda
- Clade: Pancrustacea
- Class: Insecta
- Order: Lepidoptera
- Family: Lycaenidae
- Genus: Hypolycaena
- Species: H. narada

Binomial name
- Hypolycaena narada Kunte, 2015

Species of butterfly

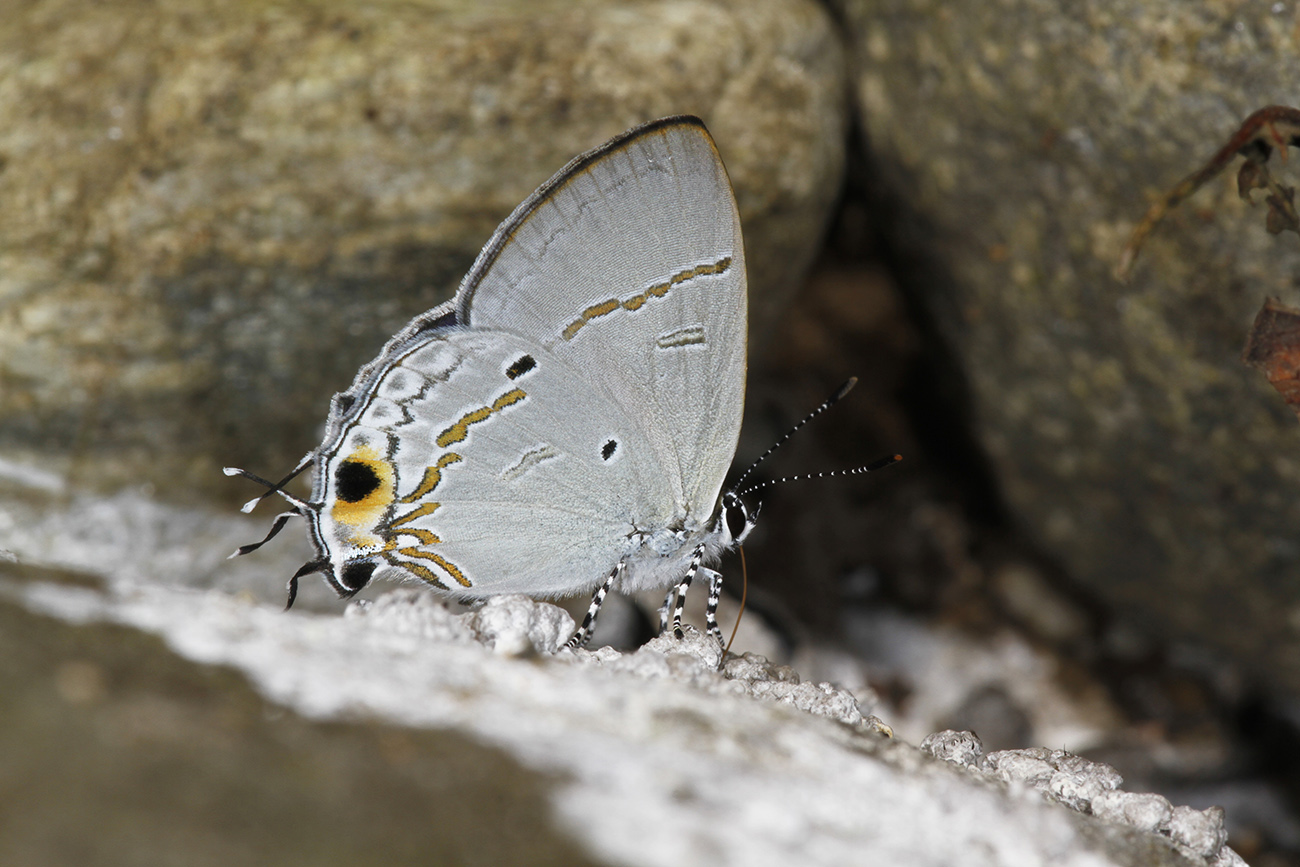
Male Hypolycaena narada, the Banded Tit, from Namdapha National Park, Arunachal Pradesh, India.

Hypolycaena narada, the Banded Tit, is a butterfly in the family Lycaenidae. It is found in Arunachal Pradesh, India.

== Range ==
The species is known only from Arunachal Pradesh, India, so far, but may occur in the adjoining north-eastern states of India and in Myanmar.

== Status ==
Locally common.

== Description ==
Distinguished from other related species based on the following characters:

- Slightly shining purple-blue upper forewing with a dark, diffused androconial patch
- Underside forewing apex and margin concolorous with the wing
- Underside wings with narrow discal bands, ending in black costal spots
- Coastal black spot near the base

== Habits ==
It is common along cool streams and frequently encountered puddling on wet soil.

== See also ==
- List of butterflies of India
- List of butterflies of India (Lycaenidae)
