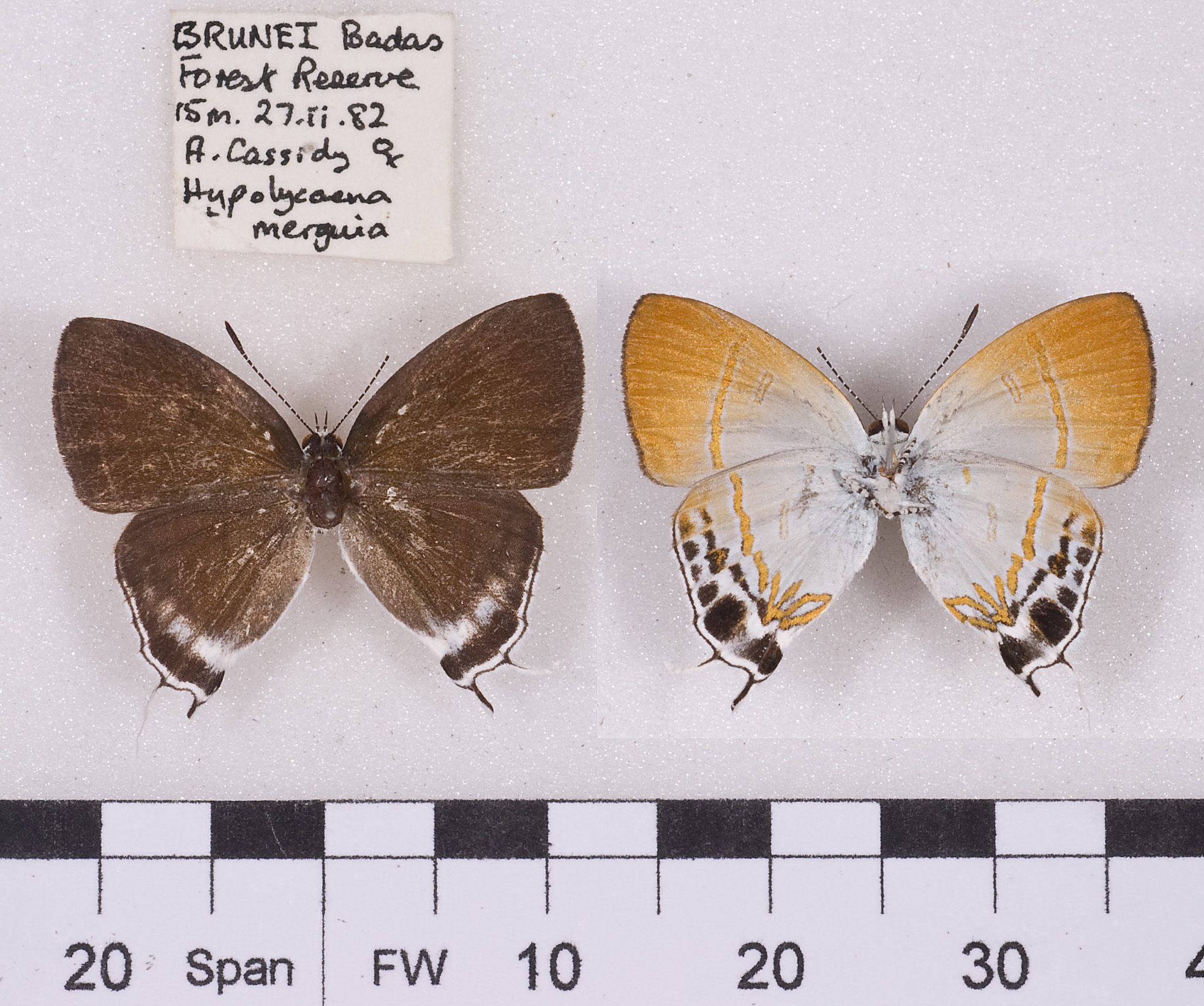

Scientific classification
- Kingdom: Animalia
- Phylum: Arthropoda
- Clade: Pancrustacea
- Class: Insecta
- Order: Lepidoptera
- Family: Lycaenidae
- Genus: Hypolycaena
- Species: H. amabilis

Binomial name
- Hypolycaena amabilis (de Nicéville, [1895])

Synonyms
- Chliaria amabilis de Nicéville, 1895; Zeltus amabilis; Chliaria libsa Corbet, 1948

= Hypolycaena amabilis =

Species of butterfly

Hypolycaena amabilis is a butterfly in the family Lycaenidae. It was described by Lionel de Nicéville in 1895. It is found in South-east Asia.

== Description ==
A beautiful large form; the above is sky-blue with but little black in the apex, at the costa and margin. The under surface exhibits the postdiscal band very medianly situate; the marginal area of the hindwing shows bright spots. The female is above blackish-brown with a white anal area of the hindwing.

== Subspecies ==
- Hypolycaena amabilis amabilis (Java)
- Hypolycaena amabilis lisba (Corbet, 1948) (southern Thailand, Peninsular Malaya, Sumatra, Borneo)
