= Hypolycaena ogadenensis =

Scientific classification
- Kingdom: Animalia
- Phylum: Arthropoda
- Clade: Pancrustacea
- Class: Insecta
- Order: Lepidoptera
- Family: Lycaenidae
- Genus: Hypolycaena
- Species: H. ogadenensis

Binomial name
- Hypolycaena ogadenensis Stempffer, 1946

Species of butterfly

Hypolycaena ogadenensis is a butterfly in the family Lycaenidae. It was described by Henri Stempffer in 1946. It is found in Ethiopia.
