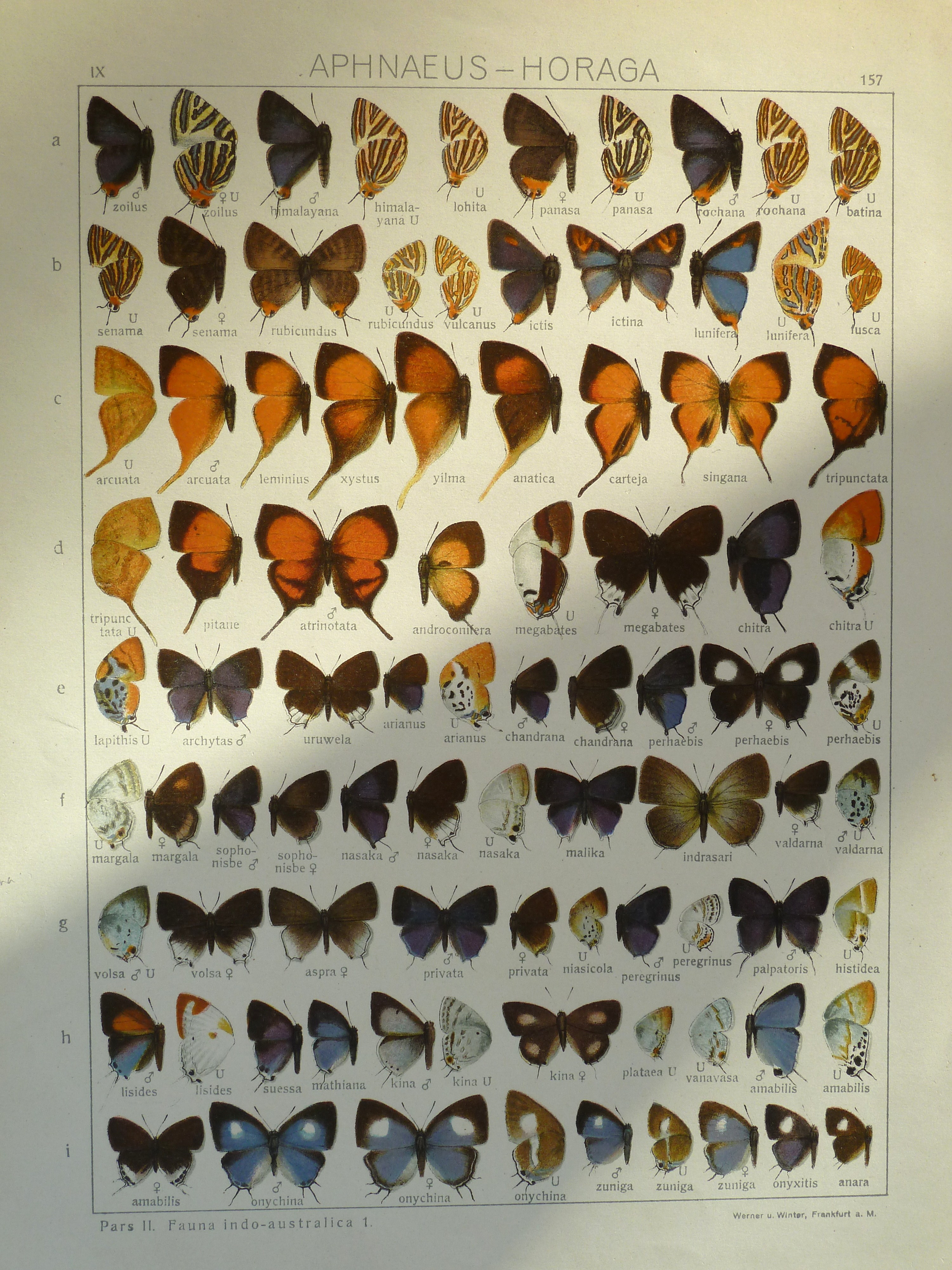
- Hypolycaena vanavasa in Seitz (h)

Scientific classification
- Kingdom: Animalia
- Phylum: Arthropoda
- Clade: Pancrustacea
- Class: Insecta
- Order: Lepidoptera
- Family: Lycaenidae
- Genus: Hypolycaena
- Species: H. vanavasa

Binomial name
- Hypolycaena vanavasa (Fruhstorfer, 1909)

Synonyms
- Chliaria vanavasa Fruhstorfer, 1909

= Hypolycaena vanavasa =

Species of butterfly

Hypolycaena vanavasa is a butterfly in the family Lycaenidae. It was described by Hans Fruhstorfer in 1909. It is found in Taiwan.
