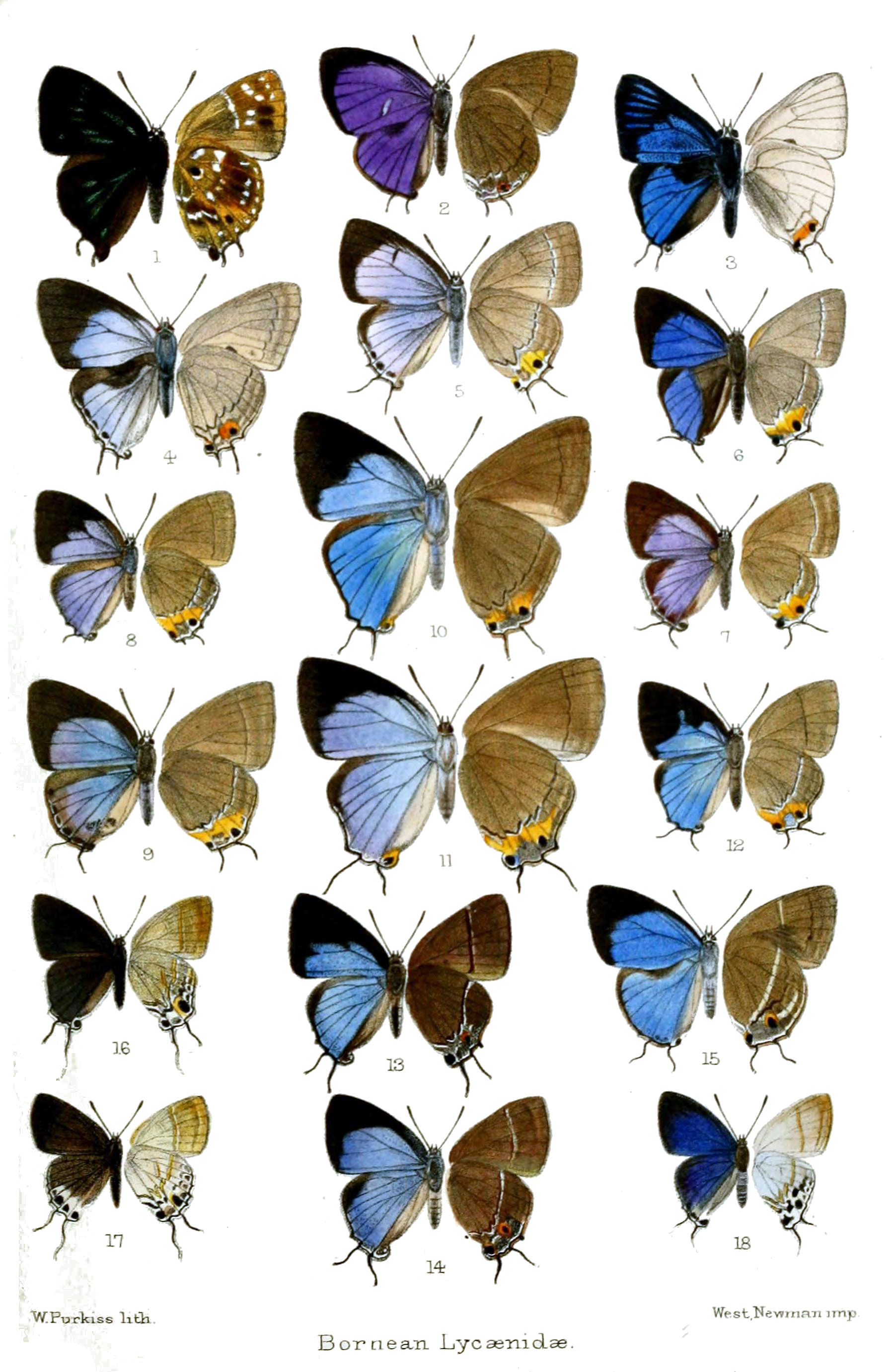
- Figs. 16, 17

Scientific classification
- Kingdom: Animalia
- Phylum: Arthropoda
- Clade: Pancrustacea
- Class: Insecta
- Order: Lepidoptera
- Family: Lycaenidae
- Genus: Hypolycaena
- Species: H. merguia

Binomial name
- Hypolycaena merguia (Doherty, 1889)

Synonyms
- Chliaria merguia Doherty, 1889; Chliaria merguia watsoni Swinhoe, 1911; Chliaria merguia histiaea Fruhstorfer, 1914; Chliaria merguia histiäa Fruhstorfer, 1914; Hypolycaena skapane Druce, 1895; Chliaria merguia sobanas Fruhstorfer, 1914; Chliaria merguia palpatoris Fruhstorfer, 1914

= Hypolycaena merguia =

Species of butterfly

Hypolycaena merguia is a butterfly in the family Lycaenidae. It was described by Doherty in 1889. It is found in South-east Asia.

== Subspecies ==
- Hypolycaena merguia merguia (Mergui, southern Burma, Thailand)
- Hypolycaena merguia watsoni (Swinhoe, 1911) (Burma, Thailand)
- Hypolycaena merguia histiaea (Fruhstorfer, 1914) (Sumatra)
- Hypolycaena merguia skapane Druce, 1895 (Borneo)
- Hypolycaena merguia palpatoris (Fruhstorfer, 1914) (western Java)
