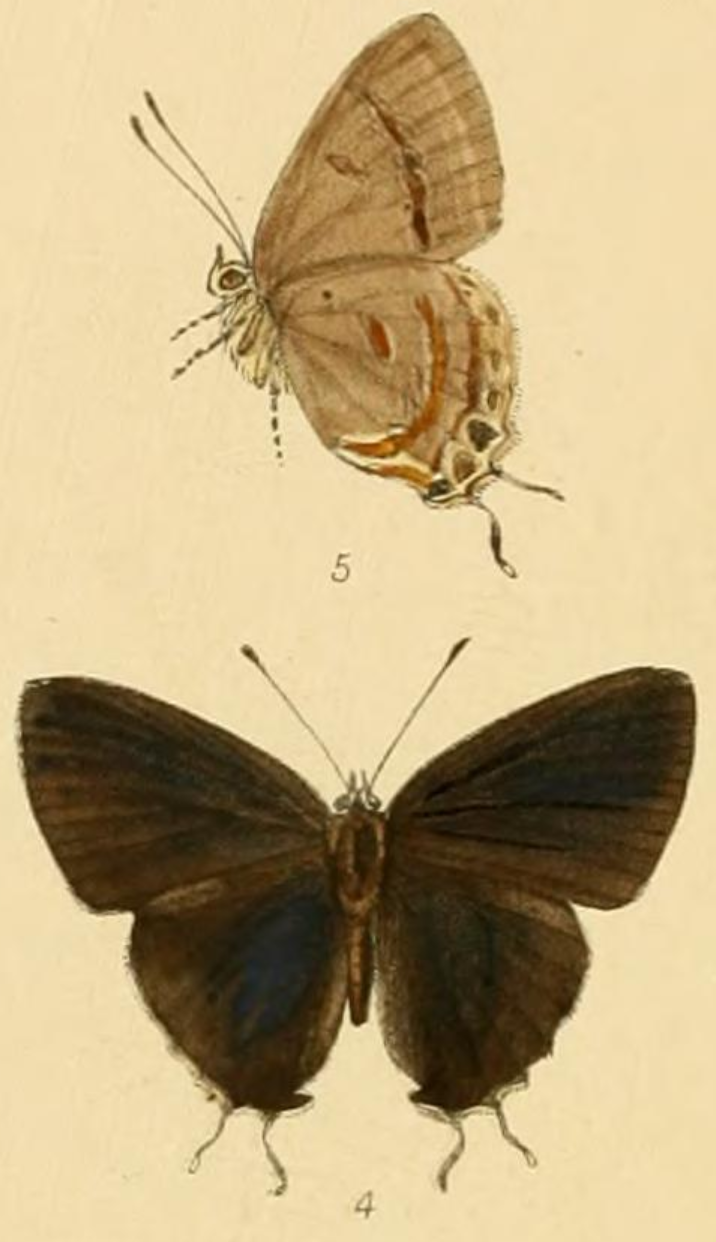
- Horace Knight's 1900 illustration of a male from New Ireland

Scientific classification
- Kingdom: Animalia
- Phylum: Arthropoda
- Clade: Pancrustacea
- Class: Insecta
- Order: Lepidoptera
- Family: Lycaenidae
- Genus: Hypolycaena
- Species: H. erasmus

Binomial name
- Hypolycaena erasmus Grose-Smith, 1900

= Hypolycaena erasmus =

Species of butterfly

Hypolycaena erasmus is a butterfly in the family Lycaenidae. It was described by Henley Grose-Smith in 1900. It is found on the Bismarck Archipelago and Halmahera.
