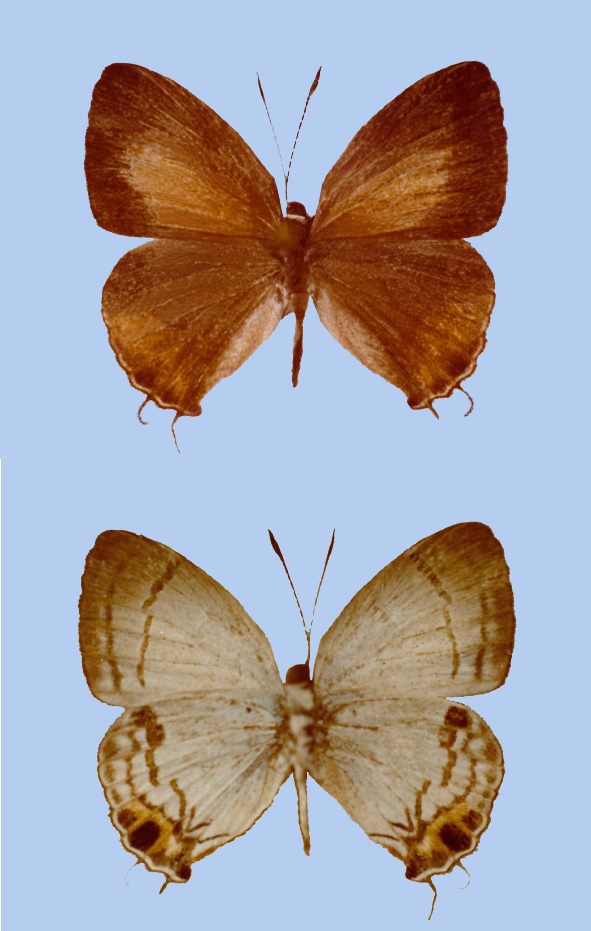
- Female, upperside and underside

Scientific classification
- Kingdom: Animalia
- Phylum: Arthropoda
- Clade: Pancrustacea
- Class: Insecta
- Order: Lepidoptera
- Family: Lycaenidae
- Genus: Hypolycaena
- Species: H. schroederi

Binomial name
- Hypolycaena schroederi (H. Hayashi, 1984)

= Hypolycaena schroederi =

Species of butterfly

Hypolycaena schroederi is a butterfly of the family Lycaenidae first described by Hisakazu Hayashi in 1984. It is endemic to the Philippines where it is distributed on Mindanao and Samar islands. It is a very rare species.

Its forewing length is 13–14 mm.

Etymology. The Specific name is dedicated to Dr. H. Schroeder of Forschungsinstitut Senckenberg in Frankfurt am Main.
