= Hypolycaena kakumi =

Scientific classification
- Kingdom: Animalia
- Phylum: Arthropoda
- Clade: Pancrustacea
- Class: Insecta
- Order: Lepidoptera
- Family: Lycaenidae
- Genus: Hypolycaena
- Species: H. kakumi

Binomial name
- Hypolycaena kakumi Larsen, 1997

Species of butterfly

Hypolycaena kakumi, the Kakum fairy hairstreak, is a butterfly in the family Lycaenidae. It is found in eastern Ivory Coast, Ghana, Togo, Nigeria (the southern part of the country and the Cross River loop), Cameroon and the Republic of the Congo. The habitat consists of forests.

Torben Larsen developed a species numbering system for his 2005 publication Butterflies of West Africa. This species is #451. The 'Larsen' numbers have since been used with permission in A Sharp Eye on Butterflies of Ghana.
