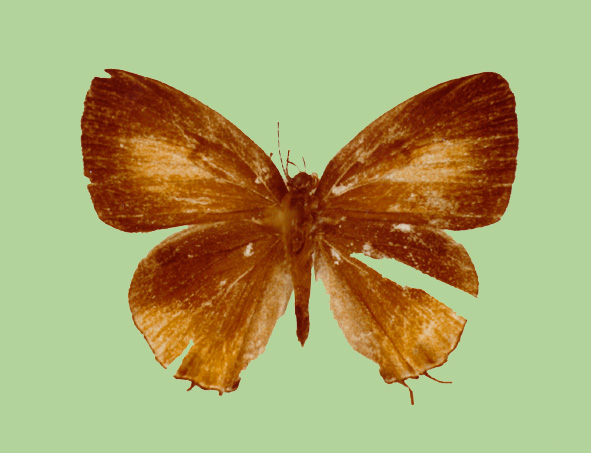
- Female upperside
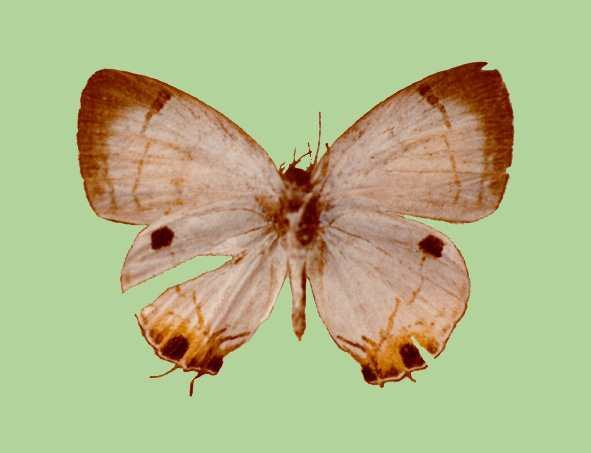
- Female underside

Scientific classification
- Kingdom: Animalia
- Phylum: Arthropoda
- Clade: Pancrustacea
- Class: Insecta
- Order: Lepidoptera
- Family: Lycaenidae
- Genus: Hypolycaena
- Species: H. irawana

Binomial name
- Hypolycaena irawana (H. Hayashi, Schröder & Treadaway, 1984)

= Hypolycaena irawana =

Species of butterfly

Hypolycaena irawana is a butterfly of the family Lycaenidae first described by Hisakazu Hayashi, Heinz G. Schroeder and Colin G. Treadaway in 1984. It is found in Palawan in the Philippines.
