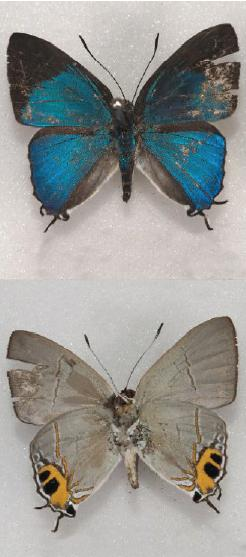
- Male
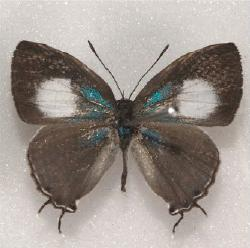
- Female

Scientific classification
- Kingdom: Animalia
- Phylum: Arthropoda
- Clade: Pancrustacea
- Class: Insecta
- Order: Lepidoptera
- Family: Lycaenidae
- Genus: Hypolycaena
- Species: H. asahi

Binomial name
- Hypolycaena asahi Okubo, 2007

Synonyms
- Pterophorus decipiens Lederer, 1870; Pterophorus tristanae Zagulajev, 1986

= Hypolycaena asahi =

Species of butterfly

Hypolycaena asahi is a butterfly of the family Lycaenidae. It is found in Indonesia (including Ambon, central Maluku and Seram).

The length of the forewings is about 13 mm. Both the forewings and hindwings are metallic blue with dark borders. The forewing black border is about 1 mm wide at the tornus but rapidly widening along the termen to meet the costa at its midpoint, then running down to the base, but not quite entering the cell. The hindwings are black between veins seven and eight, and have a dark grey dorsal border. There is a small black tornal lobe with a white marginal streak. There are also white-tipped black tails.
