= Paratephritis karura =

Scientific classification
- Kingdom: Animalia
- Phylum: Arthropoda
- Class: Insecta
- Order: Diptera
- Family: Tephritidae
- Subfamily: Tephritinae
- Tribe: Tephritini
- Genus: Paratephritis
- Species: P. karura

Binomial name
- Paratephritis karura Munro, 1957

Species of fly

Paratephritis karura is a species of tephritid or fruit flies in the genus Paratephritis of the family Tephritidae.

== Distribution ==
Kenya.
