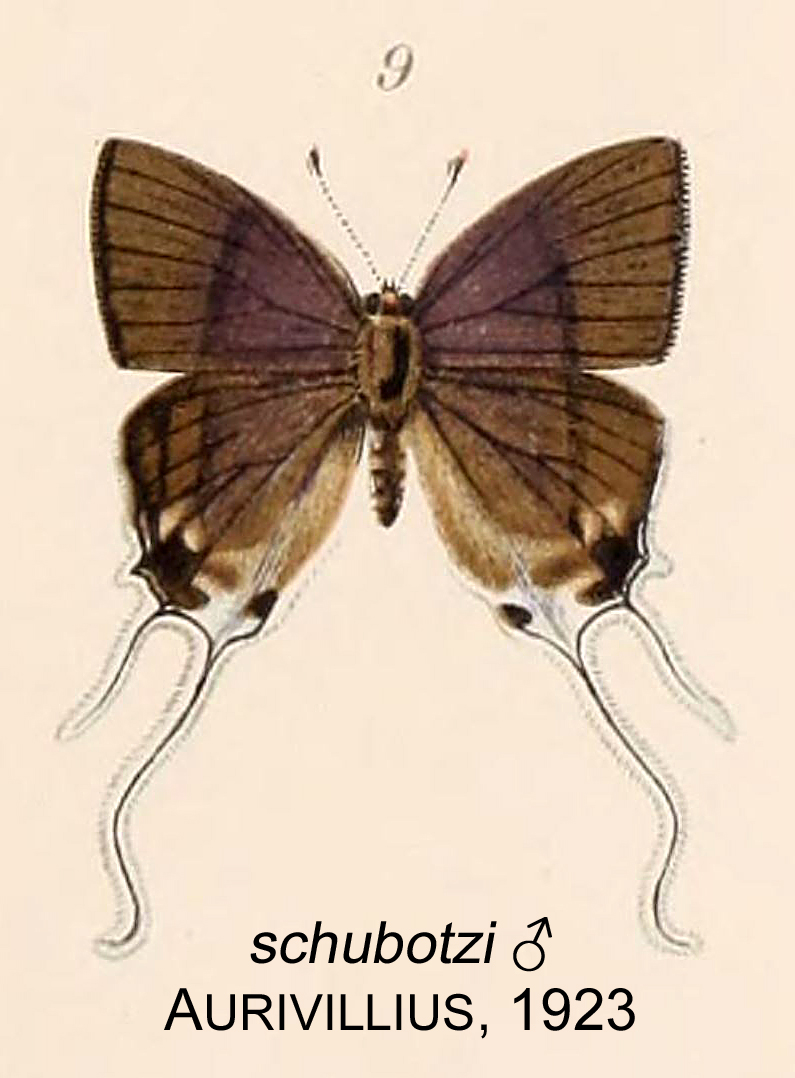

Scientific classification
- Kingdom: Animalia
- Phylum: Arthropoda
- Clade: Pancrustacea
- Class: Insecta
- Order: Lepidoptera
- Family: Lycaenidae
- Genus: Hypolycaena
- Species: H. schubotzi

Binomial name
- Hypolycaena schubotzi Aurivillius, 1923

= Hypolycaena schubotzi =

Species of butterfly

Hypolycaena schubotzi is a butterfly in the family Lycaenidae. It was described by Christopher Aurivillius in 1923. It is found in the Democratic Republic of the Congo.
