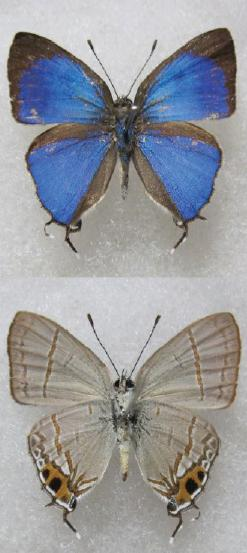
- Male
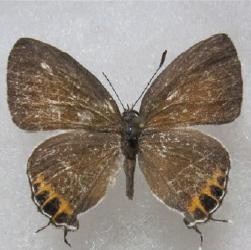
- Female

Scientific classification
- Kingdom: Animalia
- Phylum: Arthropoda
- Clade: Pancrustacea
- Class: Insecta
- Order: Lepidoptera
- Family: Lycaenidae
- Genus: Hypolycaena
- Species: H. shirozui

Binomial name
- Hypolycaena shirozui (H. Hayashi, 1981)

Synonyms
- Chliaria shirozui

= Hypolycaena shirozui =

Species of butterfly

Hypolycaena shirozui is a butterfly of the family Lycaenidae. It was described as Chliaria shirozui and moved to Hypolycaena by Hisakazu Hayashi, 1984. It is found on Mindanao, Leyte and Samar islands in the Philippines.

Etymology. The specific name is dedicated to Dr. Takashi Shirozu. A Japanese lepidopterist. Professor Emeritus of Kyushu University.
