= Hypolycaena scintillans =

Scientific classification
- Kingdom: Animalia
- Phylum: Arthropoda
- Clade: Pancrustacea
- Class: Insecta
- Order: Lepidoptera
- Family: Lycaenidae
- Genus: Hypolycaena
- Species: H. scintillans

Binomial name
- Hypolycaena scintillans Stempffer, 1957

Synonyms
- Hypolycaena lebona ab. scintillans Aurivillius, 1895

Species of butterfly

Hypolycaena scintillans, the scintillating fairy hairstreak, is a butterfly in the family Lycaenidae. It was described by Henri Stempffer in 1957. It is found in Guinea, Sierra Leone, Liberia, Ivory Coast, Ghana, Nigeria and western Cameroon. Its habitat consists of primary and secondary forests.
