= Hypolycaena condamini =

Scientific classification
- Kingdom: Animalia
- Phylum: Arthropoda
- Clade: Pancrustacea
- Class: Insecta
- Order: Lepidoptera
- Family: Lycaenidae
- Genus: Hypolycaena
- Species: H. condamini

Binomial name
- Hypolycaena condamini Stempffer, 1956

Species of butterfly

Hypolycaena condamini, the Senegal hairstreak, is a butterfly in the family Lycaenidae. It is found in Senegal and Guinea. The habitat consists of Guinea savanna.
