= Paratephritis formosensis =

Scientific classification
- Kingdom: Animalia
- Phylum: Arthropoda
- Class: Insecta
- Order: Diptera
- Family: Tephritidae
- Subfamily: Tephritinae
- Tribe: Tephritini
- Genus: Paratephritis
- Species: P. formosensis

Binomial name
- Paratephritis formosensis Shiraki, 1933

Species of fly

Paratephritis formosensis is a species of tephritid or fruit flies in the genus Paratephritis of the family Tephritidae.

== Distribution ==
Taiwan.
