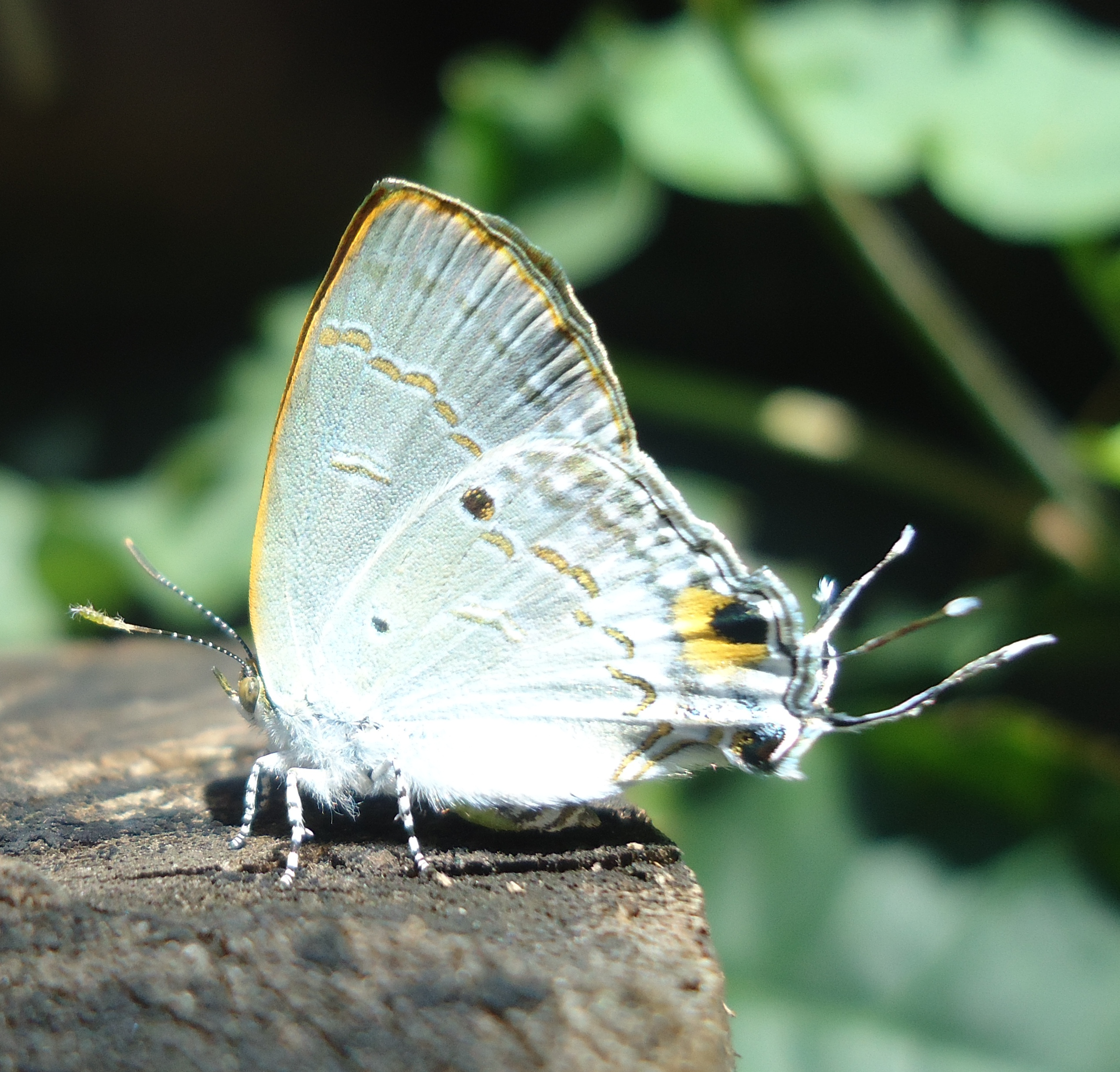
- Hypolycaena sipylus

Scientific classification
- Kingdom: Animalia
- Phylum: Arthropoda
- Class: Insecta
- Order: Lepidoptera
- Family: Lycaenidae
- Subfamily: Theclinae
- Tribe: Hypolycaenini
- Genus: Hypolycaena; C. Felder & R. Felder, 1862

Synonyms
- Tatura Butler, 1888

= Hypolycaena =

Butterfly genus in family Lycaenidae

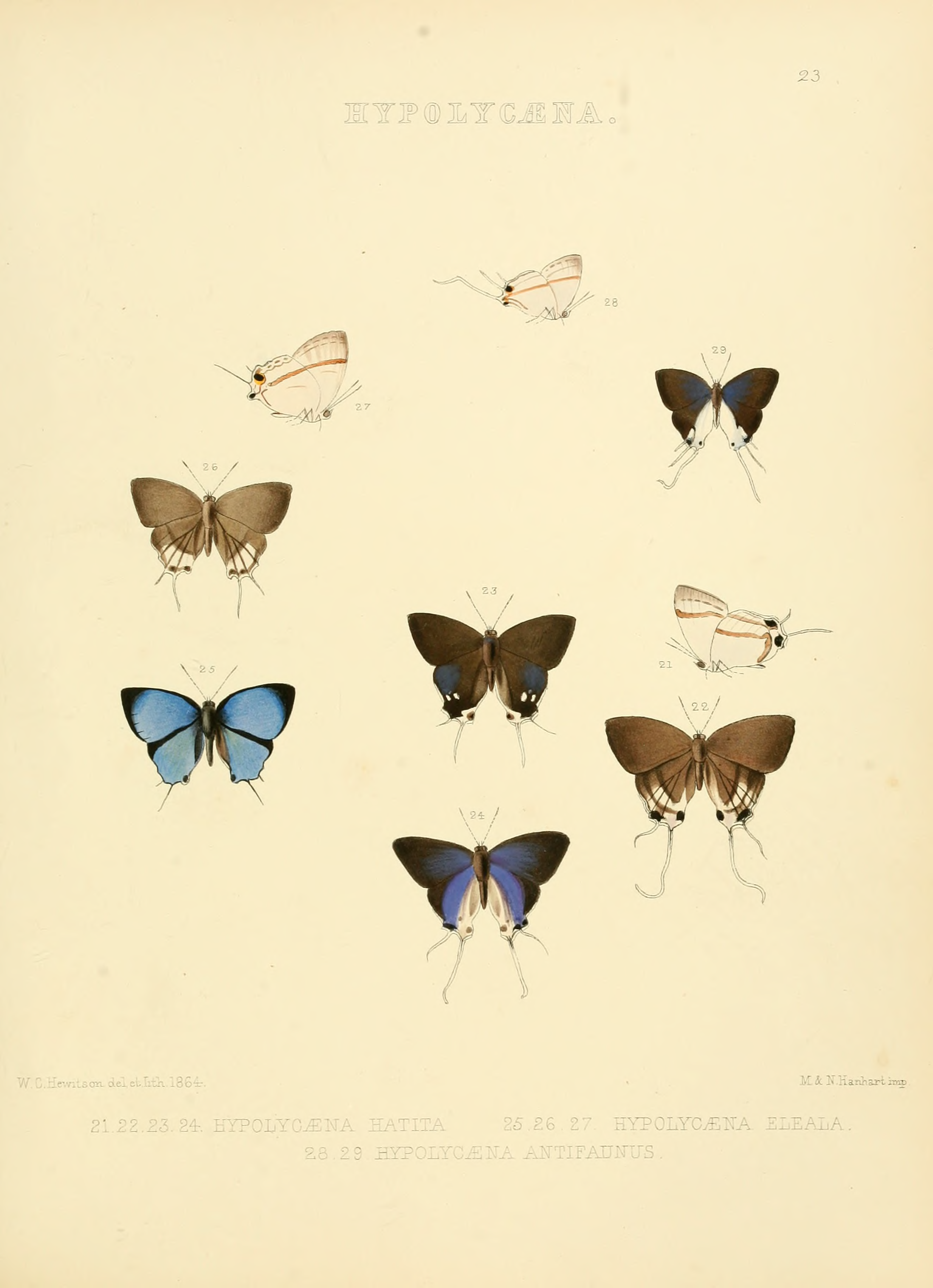
Hypolycaena from William Chapman Hewitson's Illustrations of Diurnal Lepidoptera

Hypolycaena is a butterfly genus in the family Lycaenidae. Hypolycaena species are found in the Australasian, Indomalayan and Afrotropical realms.

== Species ==
- Hypolycaena alcestis (Grose-Smith, 1889)
- Hypolycaena amabilis (de Nicéville, [1895])
- Hypolycaena amanica Stempffer, 1951
- Hypolycaena anara Larsen, 1986
- Hypolycaena antifaunus (Westwood, 1851)
- Hypolycaena asahi Okubo, 2007
- Hypolycaena auricostalis (Butler, 1897)
- Hypolycaena buxtoni Hewitson, 1874
- Hypolycaena clenchi Larsen, 1997
- Hypolycaena coerulea Aurivillius, 1895
- Hypolycaena condamini Stempffer, 1956
- Hypolycaena danis (C. & R. Felder, [1865])
- Hypolycaena dubia Aurivillius, 1895
- Hypolycaena erasmus Grose-Smith, 1900
- Hypolycaena erylus (Godart, [1824])
- Hypolycaena hatita Hewitson, 1865
- Hypolycaena irawana (H. Hayashi, Schröder & Treadaway, 1984)
- Hypolycaena ithna Hewitson, 1869
- Hypolycaena jacksoni Bethune-Baker, 1906
- Hypolycaena kadiskos Druce, 1890
- Hypolycaena kakumi Larsen, 1997
- Hypolycaena lebona (Hewitson, 1865)
- Hypolycaena liara Druce, 1890
- Hypolycaena lochmophila Tite, 1967
- Hypolycaena merguia (Doherty, 1889)
- Hypolycaena naara Hewitson, 1873
- Hypolycaena narada Kunte, 2015
- Hypolycaena nigra Bethune-Baker, 1914
- Hypolycaena nilgirica Moore, [1884]
- Hypolycaena obscura Stempffer, 1947
- Hypolycaena ogadenensis Stempffer, 1946
- Hypolycaena pachalica Butler, 1888
- Hypolycaena phemis Druce, 1895
- Hypolycaena philippus (Fabricius, 1793)
- Hypolycaena phorbas (Fabricius, 1793)
- Hypolycaena schroederi H. Hayashi, 1984
- Hypolycaena schubotzi Aurivillius, 1923
- Hypolycaena scintillans Stempffer, 1957
- Hypolycaena shirozui (H. Hayashi, 1981)
- Hypolycaena similis Dufrane, 1945
- Hypolycaena sipylus Felder, 1860
- Hypolycaena tearei Henning, 1981
- Hypolycaena thecloides (C. & R. Felder, 1860)
- Hypolycaena toshikoae H. Hayashi, 1984
- Hypolycaena vanavasa (Fruhstorfer, 1909)
- Hypolycaena xenia (Grose-Smith, 1895)
