= Hypolycaena lebona =

- male
- female both H. l. group Ghana

Scientific classification
- Kingdom: Animalia
- Phylum: Arthropoda
- Clade: Pancrustacea
- Class: Insecta
- Order: Lepidoptera
- Family: Lycaenidae
- Genus: Hypolycaena
- Species: H. lebona

Binomial name
- Hypolycaena lebona (Hewitson, 1865)

Synonyms
- Thecla lebona Hewitson, 1865; Hypolycaena lebona ab. anomala Dufrane, 1953; Hypolycaena lebona ab. splendens Dufrane, 1953

Species of butterfly

Hypolycaena lebona, the fairy hairstreak, is a butterfly in the family Lycaenidae. It is found in Sierra Leone, Liberia, Ivory Coast, Ghana, Togo, Nigeria, Cameroon, Gabon, the Republic of the Congo, the Central African Republic, the Democratic Republic of the Congo, Uganda and Tanzania. The habitat consists of forests.

Adults mud-puddle and have also been recorded imbibing moisture from moist wood ash.

The larvae have been recorded feeding on ewo (a word in the Yoruba language). They are associated with ants of the genus Pheidole, including P. aurivillii race kasaiensis. The larvae are deep green in colour.

== Subspecies ==
- Hypolycaena lebona lebona (Sierra Leone, Liberia, Ivory Coast, Ghana, Togo, Nigeria: south and the Cross River loop, Cameroon, Gabon, Congo, Central African Republic, Democratic Republic of the Congo)
- Hypolycaena lebona davenporti Larsen, 1997 (eastern Democratic Republic of the Congo, Uganda, north-western Tanzania)

Torben Larsen developed a species numbering system for his 2005 publication Butterflies of West Africa. This species is #446. The 'Larsen' numbers have since been used with permission in A Sharp Eye on Butterflies of Ghana.
