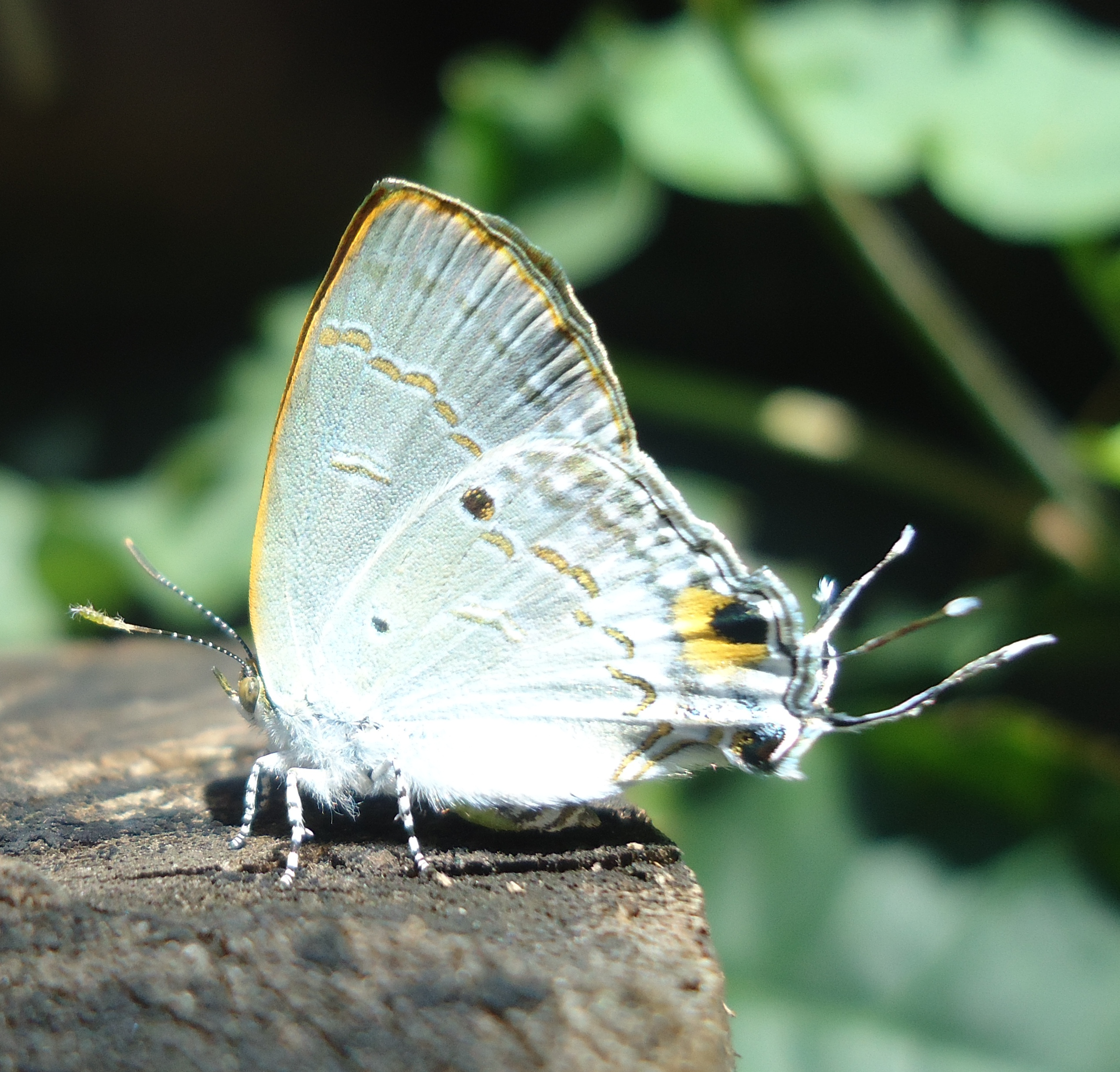

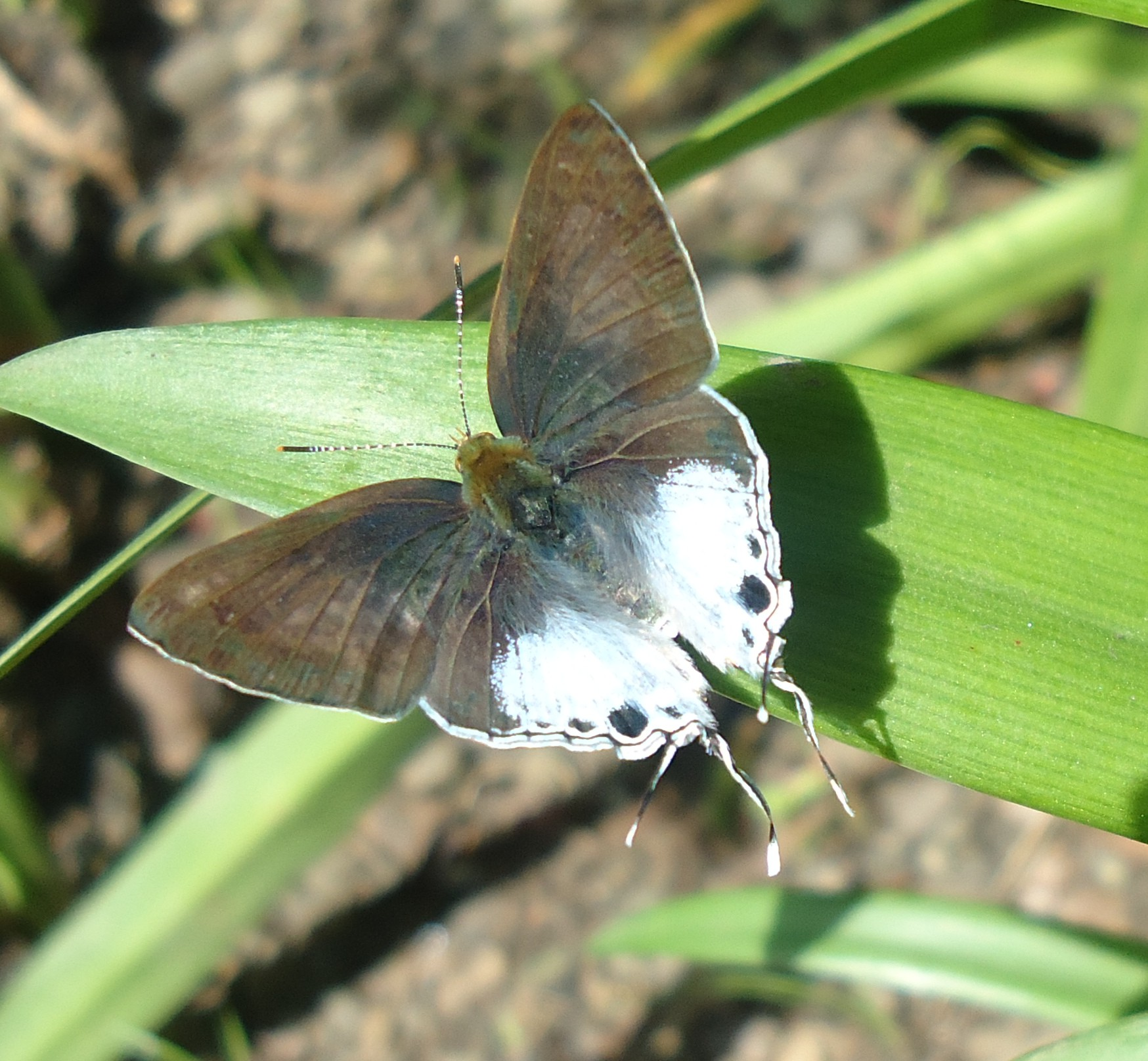

Scientific classification
- Kingdom: Animalia
- Phylum: Arthropoda
- Clade: Pancrustacea
- Class: Insecta
- Order: Lepidoptera
- Family: Lycaenidae
- Genus: Hypolycaena
- Species: H. sipylus

Binomial name
- Hypolycaena sipylus Felder, 1860

Synonyms
- Hypolycaena tharrytas C. & R. Felder, 1862

= Hypolycaena sipylus =

Species of butterfly

Hypolycaena sipylus is a butterfly of the family Lycaenidae. It is widespread in Indonesia as well as occurring in the Philippines and the New Guinea region. It is the type species of the genus Hypolycaena.

== Subspecies ==
- H. s. sipylus (Moluccas)
- H. s. tharrytas C. & R. Felder, 1862 (Philippines)
- H. s. giscon Fruhstorfer, 1912 (northern Sulawesi, Sula islands)
- H. s. rhodanus Fruhstorfer (southern Sulawesi)
- H. s. numa Fruhstorfer, 1912 (Wetar Island, south-western Maluku, Lesser Sunda chain)
- H. s. capella Fruhstorfer (Lombok)

== Gallery ==
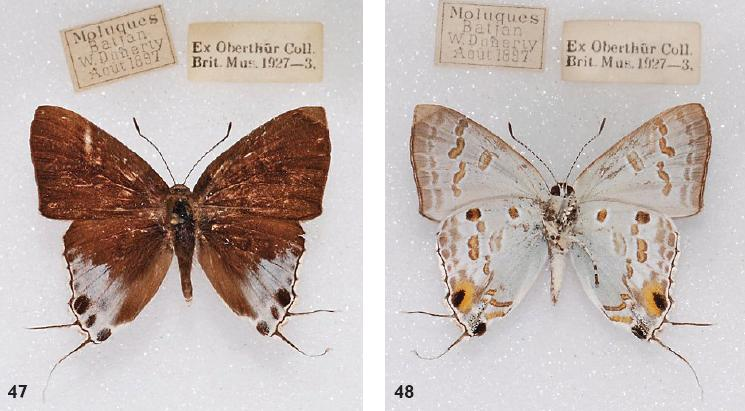
H. s. sipylus male

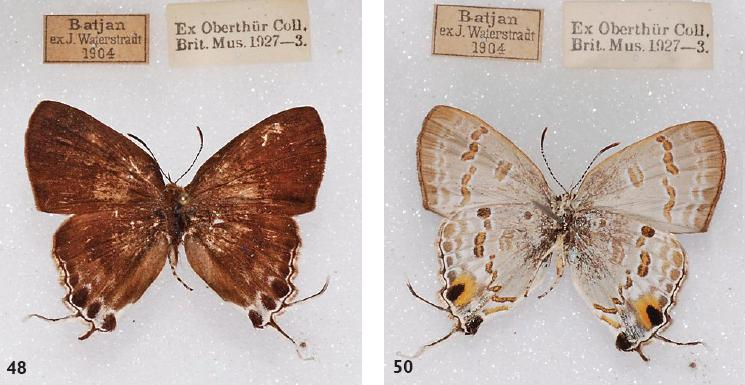
H. s. sipylus female

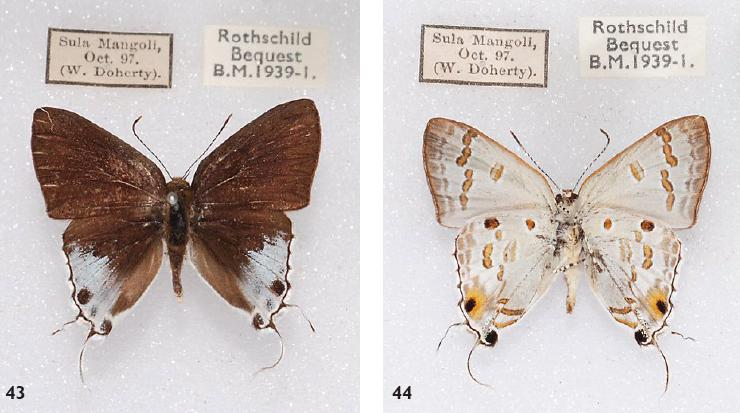
H. s. giscon male

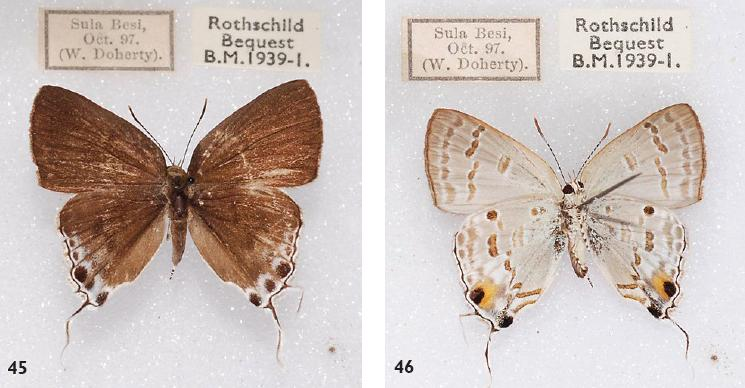
H. s. giscon female

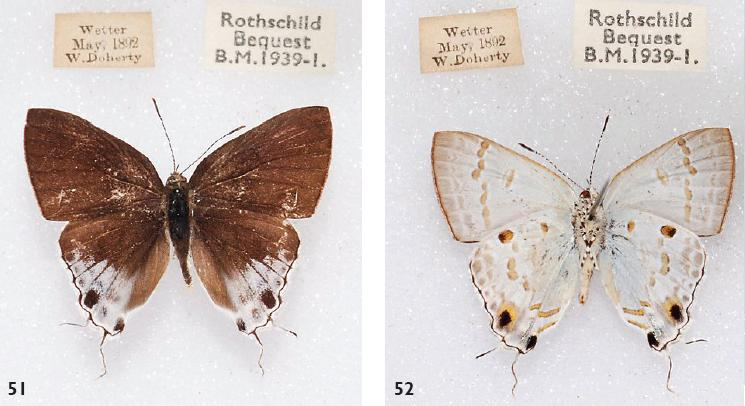
H. s. numa male

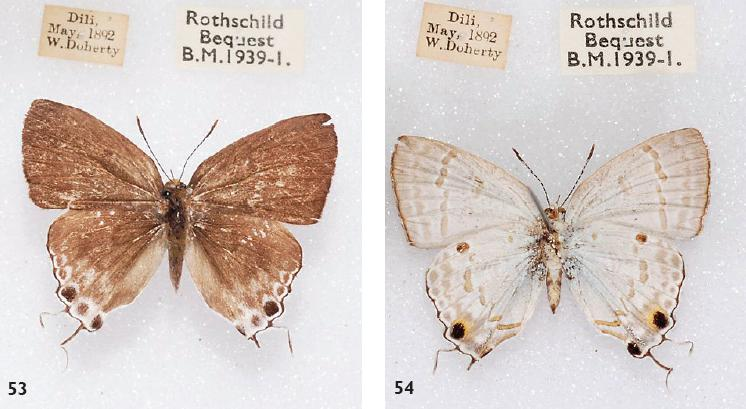
H. s. numa female
