= Paratephritis unifasciata =

Scientific classification
- Kingdom: Animalia
- Phylum: Arthropoda
- Class: Insecta
- Order: Diptera
- Family: Tephritidae
- Subfamily: Tephritinae
- Tribe: Tephritini
- Genus: Paratephritis
- Species: P. unifasciata

Binomial name
- Paratephritis unifasciata Chen, 1938

Synonyms
- Paratephritis unifasiata Chen, 1938

Species of fly

Paratephritis unifasciata is a species of tephritid or fruit flies in the genus Paratephritis of the family Tephritidae.

== Distribution ==
China.
