= Hypolycaena alcestis =

Scientific classification
- Kingdom: Animalia
- Phylum: Arthropoda
- Clade: Pancrustacea
- Class: Insecta
- Order: Lepidoptera
- Family: Lycaenidae
- Genus: Hypolycaena
- Species: H. alcestis

Binomial name
- Hypolycaena alcestis (Grose-Smith, 1889)

Synonyms
- Thecla alcestis Grose-Smith, 1889

Species of butterfly

Hypolycaena alcestis is a butterfly in the family Lycaenidae. It was described by Henley Grose-Smith in 1889. It is found on Guadalcanal and Tulagi.

== Description ==
Original. Male. Upper-side: pale silvery-blue. Anterior-wings, costal margin, and apex rather broadly, and outer margin rather narrowly, greyish-black. Posterior-wings : with a broad, submarginal band of greyish-black spots crowned with white lunular markings, above which is a row of indistinct grey markings, the middle spot nearly obsolete, below the spots is a row of narrow white lines; outer margin greyishblack, two tails of same colour tipped white.Under-side: bluish-grey. Anterior-wings with a submarginal row of narrow pale grey lunules crowned with dark grey, inside which is a row of dark grey markings, obsolete towards the costa, a pale grey line edged internally with dark grey at the end of the cell. Posterior-wings with a row of black spots crowned with white and dark grey markings as on the upper-side, but the black spot before the anal angle is obsolete; above these is an interrupted pale silvery-blue narrow band, inside which is a row of red spots edged on each side with black, and pale grey beyond, the fourth red spot the largest, extending outwardly to the row of black spots, the spot above the obsolete black spot is sagittate, a black line eged with grey on both sides above the anal angle, a narrow dark line edged internally with pale grey at the end of the cell.Female.Resembles the male, but is paler and more grey. Exp., 1 and 1/4 in
