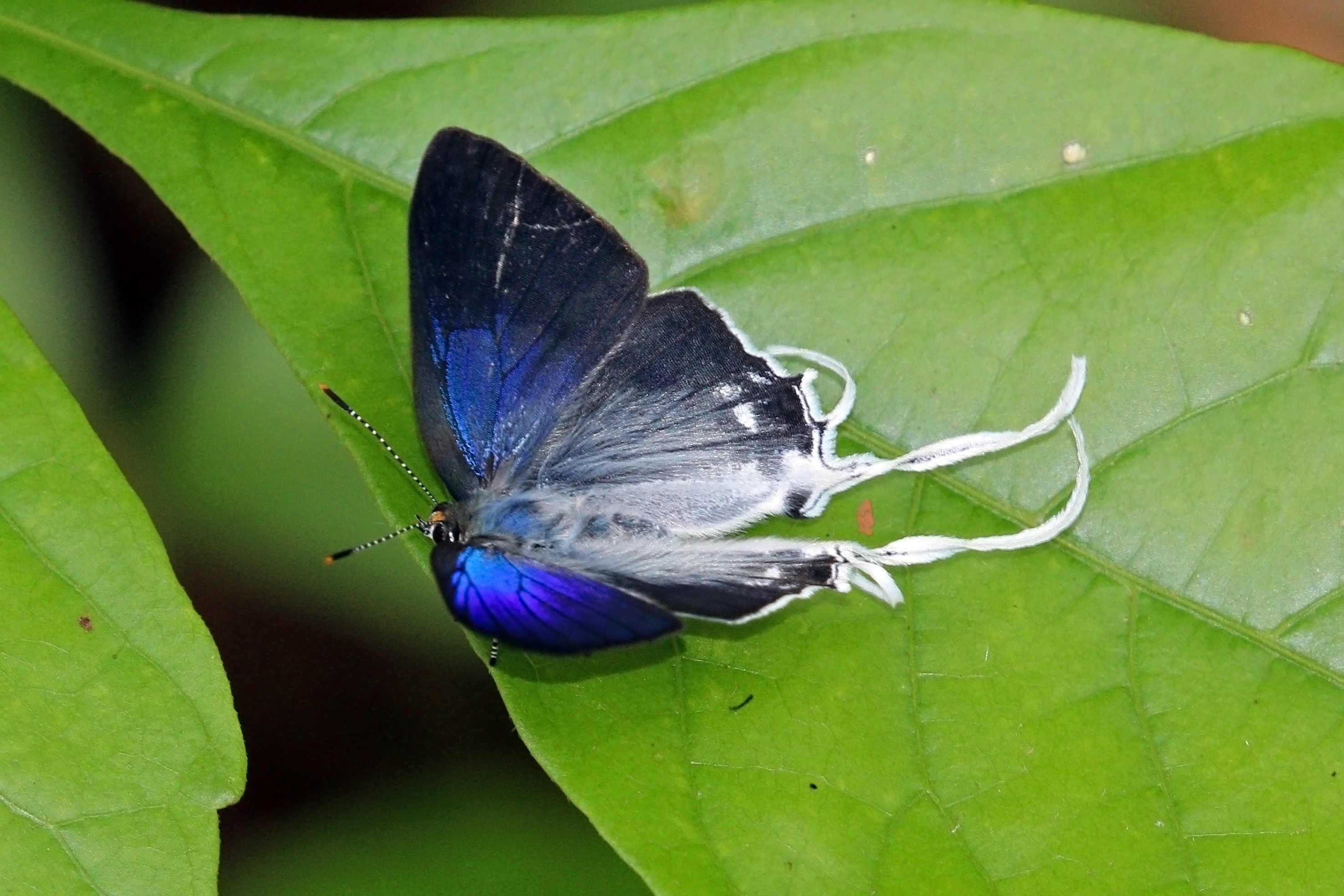

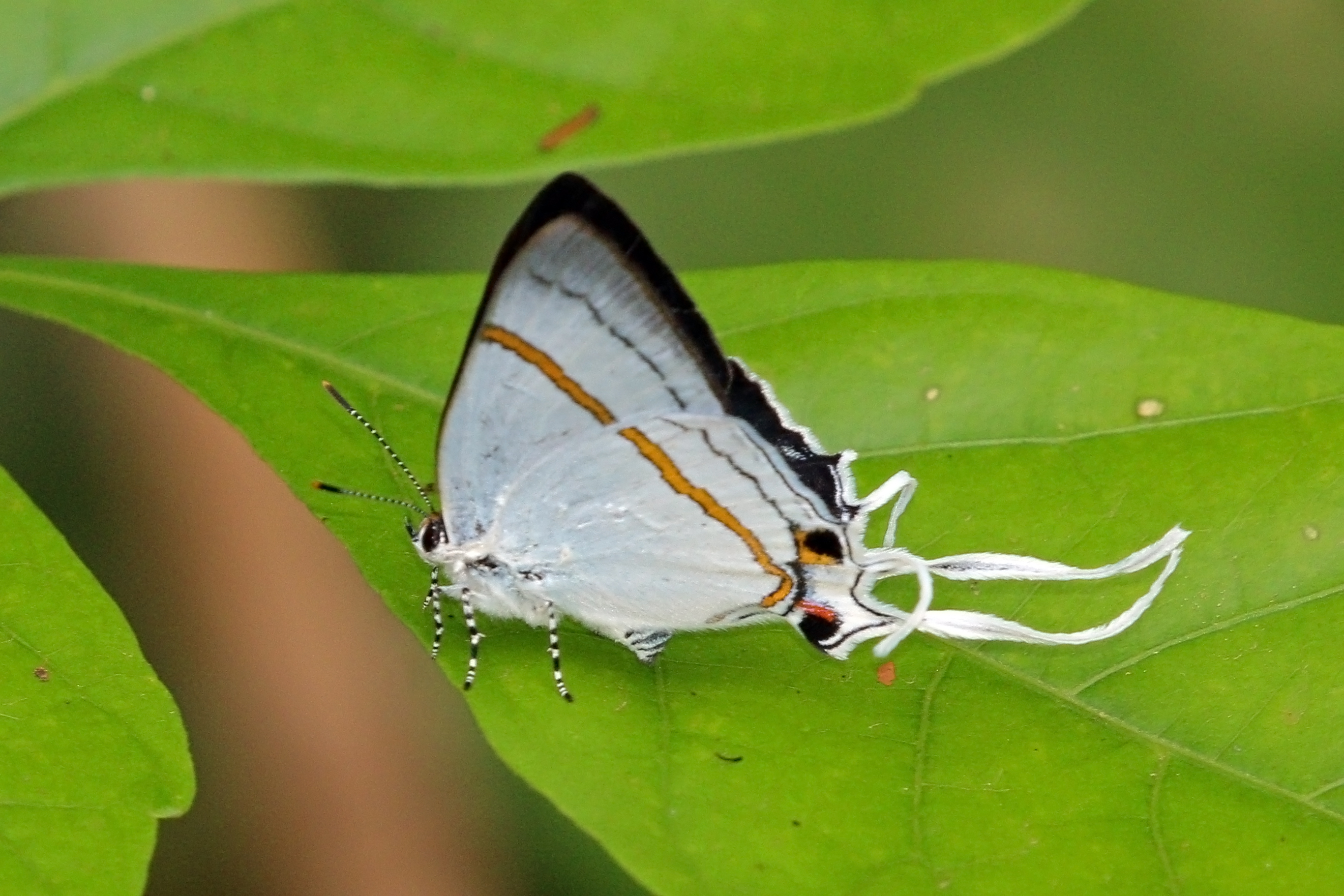
- both male H. a. antifaunus Bobiri Forest, Ghana

Scientific classification
- Kingdom: Animalia
- Phylum: Arthropoda
- Clade: Pancrustacea
- Class: Insecta
- Order: Lepidoptera
- Family: Lycaenidae
- Genus: Hypolycaena
- Species: H. antifaunus

Binomial name
- Hypolycaena antifaunus (Westwood, 1851)

Synonyms
- Iolaus antifaunus Westwood, 1851; Hypolycaena antifaunus ab. latefasciata Dufrane, 1953; Zeltus antifaunus latimacula Joicey & Talbot, 1921

= Hypolycaena antifaunus =

Large fairy hairstreak

Species of butterfly

Hypolycaena antifaunus, the large fairy hairstreak, is a butterfly in the family Lycaenidae which is native to the African tropics and subtropics.

== Range ==
It is found in Guinea, Sierra Leone, Liberia, Ivory Coast, Ghana, Togo, Nigeria, Cameroon, the Republic of the Congo, the Central African Republic, Angola, the Democratic Republic of the Congo, Uganda, Kenya, Tanzania and Zambia.

== Habitat and habits ==
The habitat consists of primary forests. Adult males mud-puddle.

== Subspecies ==
- Hypolycaena antifaunus antifaunus — Guinea, Sierra Leone, Liberia, Ivory Coast, Ghana, Togo, Nigeria: south and the Cross River loop, Cameroon, Congo, Central African Republic, Angola, Democratic Republic of the Congo, north-western Zambia
- Hypolycaena antifaunus latimacula (Joicey & Talbot, 1921) — Democratic Republic of the Congo: Kivu, Uganda, western Kenya, western Tanzania

Torben Larsen developed a species numbering system for his 2005 publication Butterflies of West Africa. The nominate subspecies is #452. The 'Larsen' numbers have since been used with permission in A Sharp Eye on Butterflies of Ghana.
