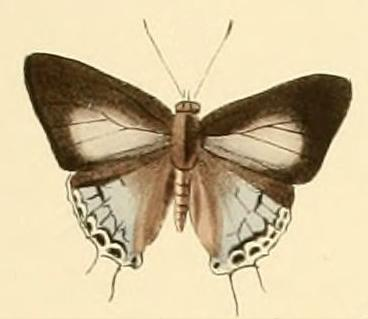

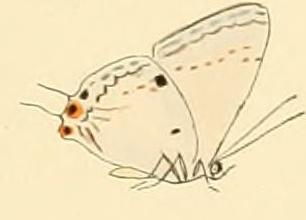

Scientific classification
- Kingdom: Animalia
- Phylum: Arthropoda
- Clade: Pancrustacea
- Class: Insecta
- Order: Lepidoptera
- Family: Lycaenidae
- Genus: Hypolycaena
- Species: H. ithna

Binomial name
- Hypolycaena ithna Hewitson, 1869

= Hypolycaena ithna =

Species of butterfly

Hypolycaena ithna is a species of butterfly of the family Lycaenidae. It is found on the Philippines (Mindanao and Cebu).
