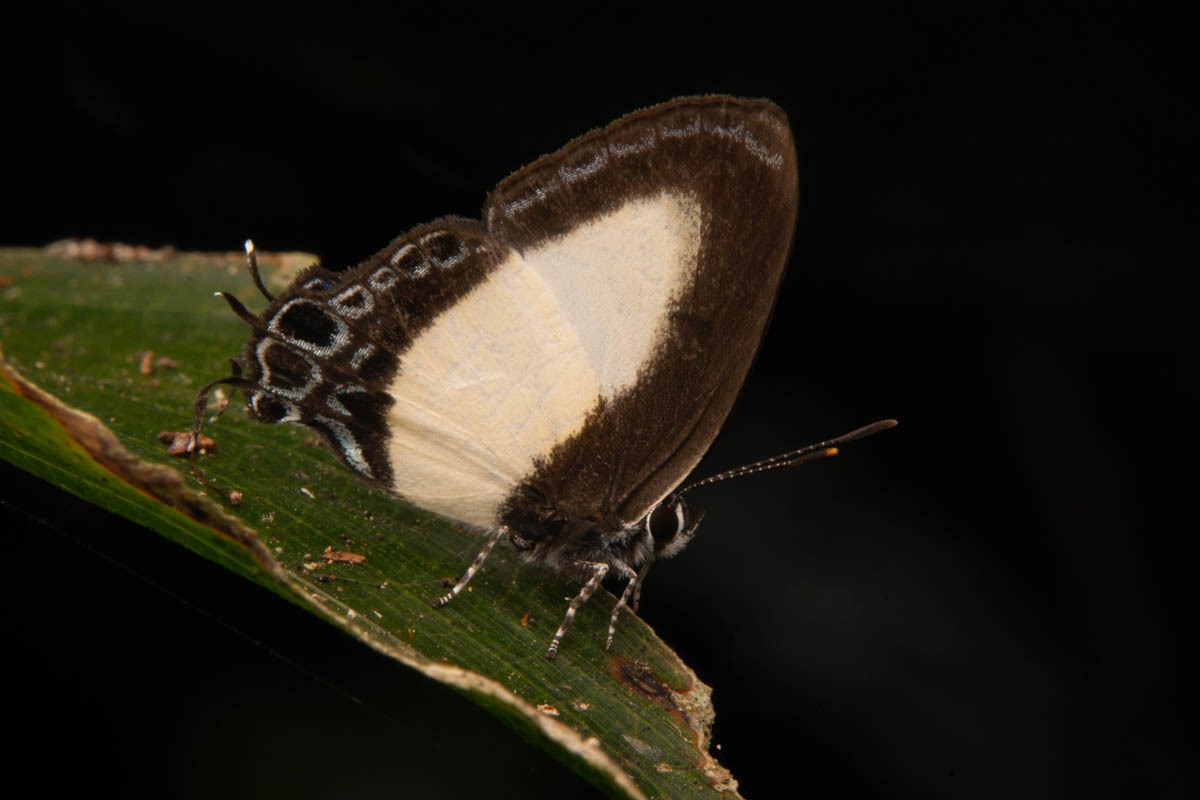

Scientific classification
- Kingdom: Animalia
- Phylum: Arthropoda
- Clade: Pancrustacea
- Class: Insecta
- Order: Lepidoptera
- Family: Lycaenidae
- Genus: Hypolycaena
- Species: H. danis

Binomial name
- Hypolycaena danis (C. & R. Felder, [1865])

Synonyms
- Myrina danis C. & R. Felder, [1865]; Pseudonotis turneri Waterhouse, 1903; Hypolycaena danisoides de Nicéville, 1897

= Hypolycaena danis =

Species of butterfly

Hypolycaena danis, the black and white tit or orchid flash, is a butterfly of the family Lycaenidae. It is found in the Maluku Province in Indonesia as well as the New Guinea region and north-eastern Australia.

The wingspan is about 30 mm. The hindwings have blue edges with black spots and two tails. The underside of the wings is similar, but the pale areas are yellowish.

The larvae feed on Vanda species and Dendrobium bigibbum, Dendrobium canaliculatum, Cattleya, Renanthera, Phalaenopsis and Phalaenanthe species.

Pupation takes place in an off-white pupa, which is attached to the stem of the host plant.

== Subspecies ==
- H. d. danis (Bachan, Halmahera, Morotai)
- H. d. danisoides de Nicéville, 1897 (Kai Islands)
- H. d. deripha Hewitson, 1878 (Aru, New Guinea, Louisade Archipelago)
- H. d. milo Grose-Smith (New Britain)
- H. d. turneri (Waterhouse, 1903) (Cape York to Cairns)

== Gallery ==
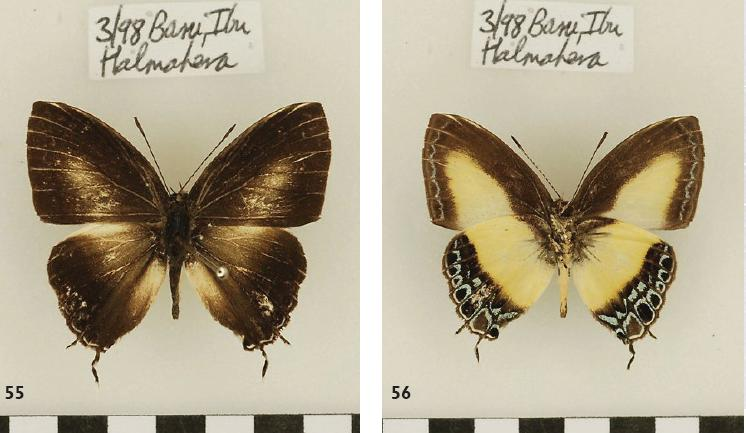
H. d. danis male

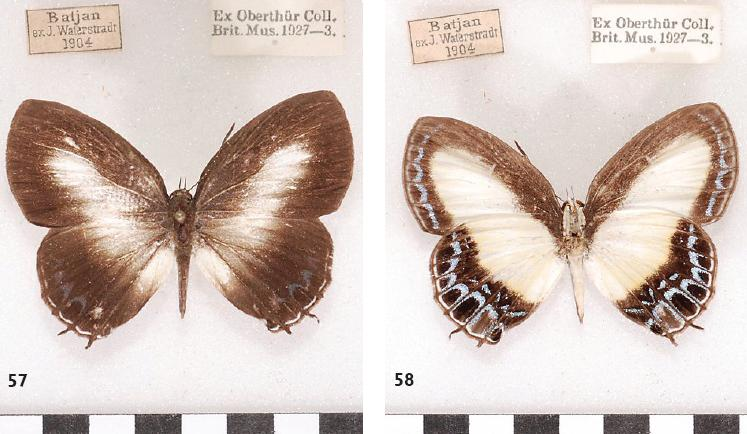
H. d. danis female

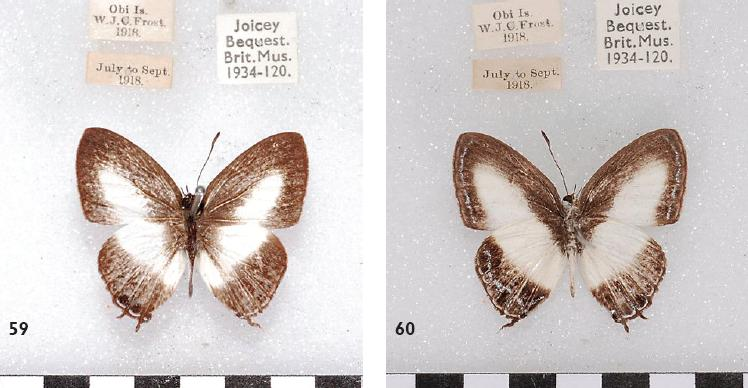
H. d. danisoides male

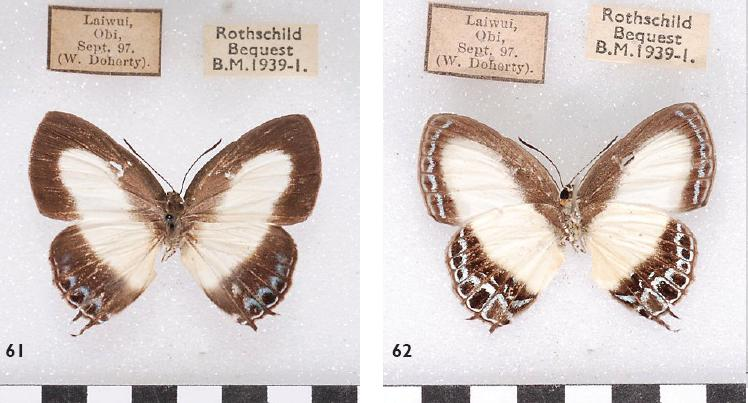
H. d. danisoides female

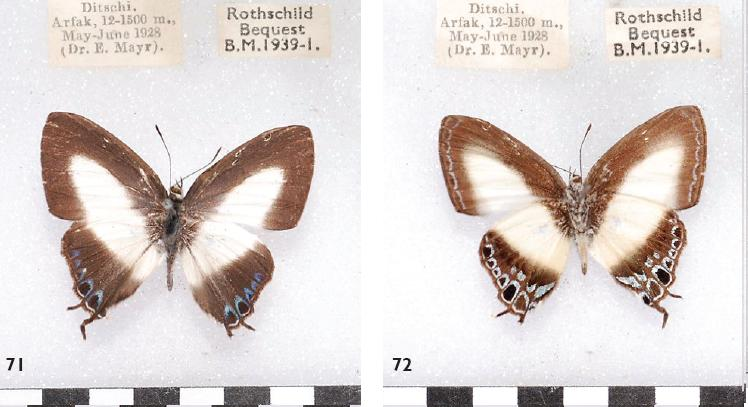
H. d. derpiha male

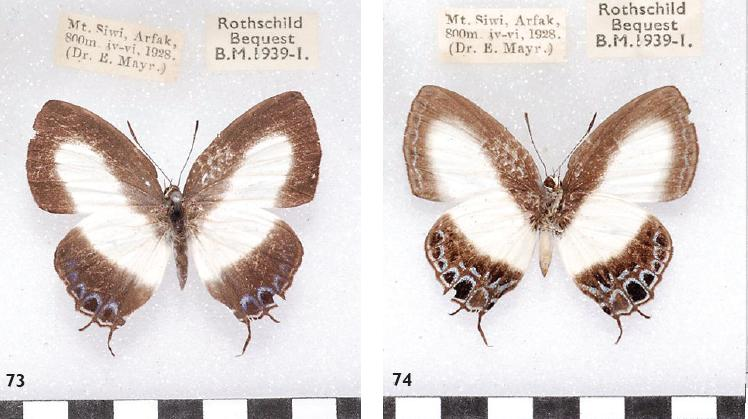
H. d. derpiha female
