= Zinnia (disambiguation) =

Zinnia is a genus of annual plant.

Zinnia may also refer to:

- Zinnia, West Virginia, United States, an unincorporated community
- Zinnia Kumar (born 1997), Australian fashion model and advocate
- HMS Zinnia (1915), a First World War Royal Navy sloop
- HMS Zinnia (K98), a Second World War Royal Navy corvette
- Zinnia, a fictional character in Pokémon Omega Ruby and Alpha Sapphire
- Zinnia, a kingdom in the 2014 film Barbie and the Secret Door
- Ethinylestradiol/cyproterone acetate, a birth control pill also known by the brand name "Zinnia"
- Zinnia Wormwood, Matilda's mother until the end of the film

== See also ==
- Xenia (disambiguation)
