= Paratephritis vitreifasciata =

Scientific classification
- Kingdom: Animalia
- Phylum: Arthropoda
- Class: Insecta
- Order: Diptera
- Family: Tephritidae
- Subfamily: Tephritinae
- Tribe: Tephritini
- Genus: Paratephritis
- Species: P. vitreifasciata

Binomial name
- Paratephritis vitreifasciata (Hering, 1938)

Synonyms
- Acanthiophilus vitreifasciatus Hering, 1938

Species of fly

Paratephritis vitreifasciata is a species of tephritid or fruit flies in the genus Paratephritis of the family Tephritidae.

== Distribution ==
This species is found in China.
