= Hypolycaena similis =

Scientific classification
- Kingdom: Animalia
- Phylum: Arthropoda
- Clade: Pancrustacea
- Class: Insecta
- Order: Lepidoptera
- Family: Lycaenidae
- Genus: Hypolycaena
- Species: H. similis

Binomial name
- Hypolycaena similis Dufrane, 1945

Species of butterfly

Hypolycaena similis is a butterfly in the family Lycaenidae. It was described by Abel Dufrane in 1945. It is found in the Democratic Republic of the Congo.
