= Hypolycaena nigra =

Scientific classification
- Kingdom: Animalia
- Phylum: Arthropoda
- Clade: Pancrustacea
- Class: Insecta
- Order: Lepidoptera
- Family: Lycaenidae
- Genus: Hypolycaena
- Species: H. nigra

Binomial name
- Hypolycaena nigra Bethune-Baker, 1914

Species of butterfly

Hypolycaena nigra, the black fairy hairstreak, is a butterfly in the family Lycaenidae. It was described by George Bethune-Baker in 1914. It is found in Sierra Leone, Liberia, Ivory Coast, Ghana, Nigeria (south and the Cross River loop), Cameroon, Gabon, the Republic of the Congo, the Central African Republic, the Democratic Republic of the Congo (Mongala, Uele, Ituri, Kivu, Tshopo, Tshuapa, Sankuru and Lualaba), Uganda and north-western Tanzania. The habitat consists of forests.

The larvae are associated with the ant species Pheidole aurivillii race kasaiensis. They are soft, green and onisciform (woodlouse shaped).

Torben Larsen developed a species numbering system for his 2005 publication Butterflies of West Africa. This species is #455. The 'Larsen' numbers have since been used with permission in A Sharp Eye on Butterflies of Ghana.
