= Xenia tornado =

Xenia tornado may refer to:

- 1974 Xenia tornado, a deadly F5 tornado that hit Xenia, Ohio, in 1974
- 2000 Xenia tornado, a violent F4 tornado that would hit Xenia a quarter-century later
