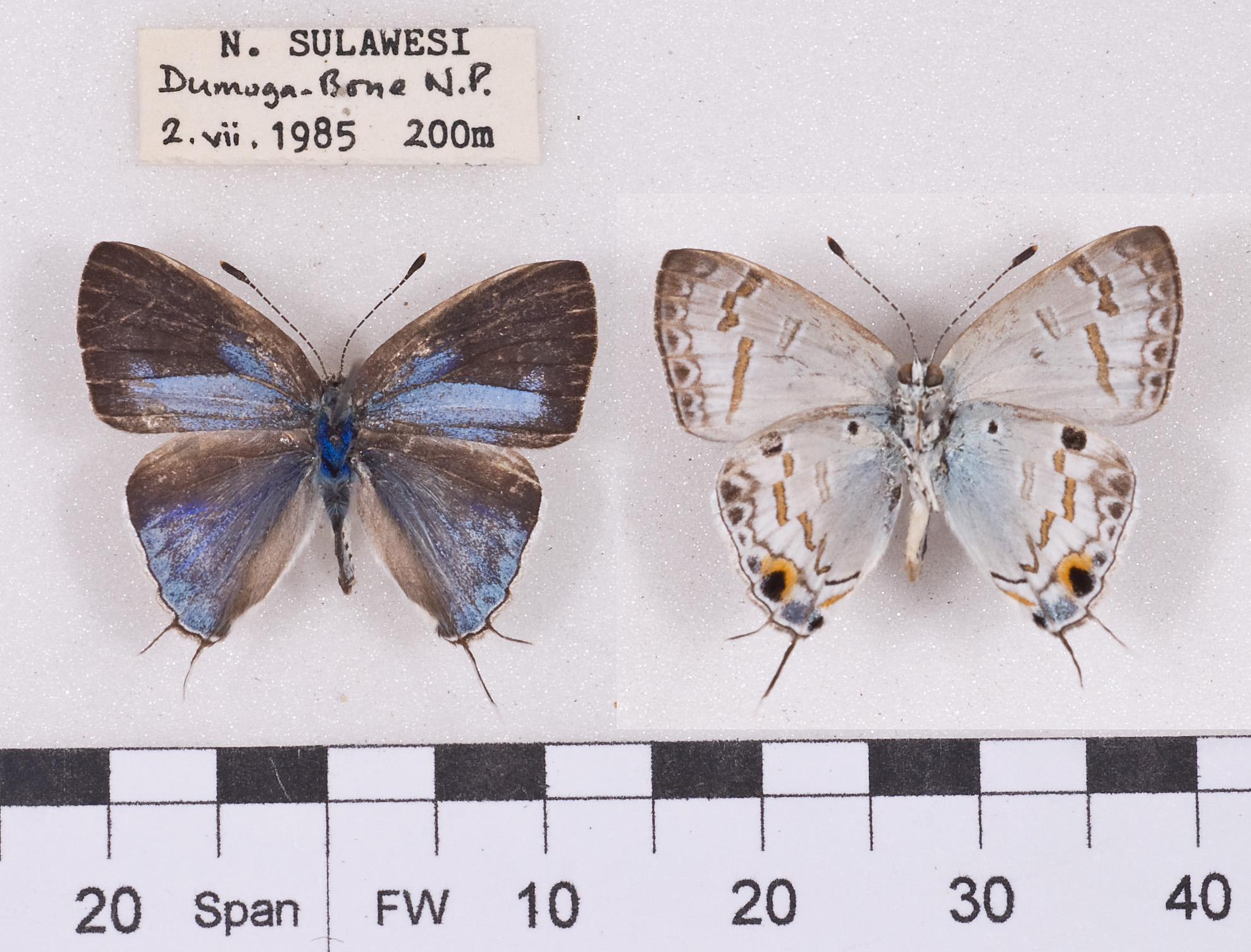

Scientific classification
- Kingdom: Animalia
- Phylum: Arthropoda
- Clade: Pancrustacea
- Class: Insecta
- Order: Lepidoptera
- Family: Lycaenidae
- Genus: Hypolycaena
- Species: H. xenia

Binomial name
- Hypolycaena xenia (Grose-Smith, 1895)

Synonyms
- Chliaria xenia Grose-Smith, 1895

= Hypolycaena xenia =

Species of butterfly

Hypolycaena xenia is a butterfly in the family Lycaenidae. It was described by Henley Grose-Smith in 1895. It is found in southern Sulawesi in Indonesia.
