= List of butterflies of Benin =

Location of Benin

This is a list of butterflies of Benin. About 470 species are known from Benin, none of which are endemic.

== Papilionidae ==
=== Papilioninae ===
14 species

==== Papilionini ====
- Papilio nireus Linnaeus, 1758
- Papilio chrapkowskoides nurettini Koçak, 1983
- Papilio sosia Rothschild & Jordan, 1903
- Papilio dardanus Brown, 1776
- Papilio phorcas Cramer, 1775
- Papilio demodocus Esper, [1798]

==== Leptocercini ====
- Graphium antheus (Cramer, 1779)
- Graphium policenes (Cramer, 1775)
- Graphium angolanus baronis (Ungemach, 1932)
- Graphium leonidas (Fabricius, 1793)
- Graphium adamastor (Boisduval, 1836)
- Graphium agamedes (Westwood, 1842)

== Pieridae ==
43 species

=== Coliadinae ===
- Eurema brigitta (Stoll, [1780])
- Eurema desjardinsii marshalli (Butler, 1898)
- Eurema hapale (Mabille, 1882)
- Eurema hecabe solifera (Butler, 1875)
- Eurema senegalensis (Boisduval, 1836)
- Catopsilia florella (Fabricius, 1775)

=== Pierinae ===
- Colotis antevippe (Boisduval, 1836)
- Colotis aurora evarne (Klug, 1829)
- Colotis euippe (Linnaeus, 1758)
- Colotis evagore antigone (Boisduval, 1836)
- Nepheronia pharis (Boisduval, 1836)
- Nepheronia thalassina (Boisduval, 1836)
- Leptosia alcesta (Stoll, [1782])
- Leptosia marginea (Mabille, 1890)
- Leptosia wigginsi pseudalcesta Bernardi, 1965

==== Pierini ====
- Appias epaphia (Cramer, [1779])
- Appias phaola (Doubleday, 1847)
- Appias sylvia (Fabricius, 1775)
- Mylothris chloris (Fabricius, 1775)
- Dixeia capricornus (Ward, 1871)
- Belenois aurota (Fabricius, 1793)
- Belenois calypso (Drury, 1773)
- Belenois creona (Cramer, [1776])
- Belenois hedyle (Cramer, 1777)
- Belenois theora (Doubleday, 1846)

== Lycaenidae ==
127 species

=== Miletinae ===
==== Miletini ====
- Lachnocnema vuattouxi Libert, 1996

=== Poritiinae ===
==== Liptenini ====
- Pentila pauli Staudinger, 1888
- Pentila petreia Hewitson, 1874
- Mimeresia libentina (Hewitson, 1866)
- Liptena septistrigata (Bethune-Baker, 1903)
- Tetrarhanis symplocus Clench, 1965
- Pseuderesia eleaza (Hewitson, 1873)
- Citrinophila similis (Kirby, 1887)

=== Aphnaeinae ===
- Lipaphnaeus leonina ivoirensis Stempffer, 1966
- Cigaritis mozambica (Bertoloni, 1850)
- Zeritis neriene Boisduval, 1836
- Axiocerses harpax (Fabricius, 1775)
- Aphnaeus brahami Lathy, 1903

=== Theclinae ===
- Myrina silenus (Fabricius, 1775)
- Dapidodigma demeter (Clench, 1961)
- Hypolycaena philippus (Fabricius, 1793)
- Pilodeudorix catalla (Karsch, 1895)
- Paradeudorix eleala viridis (Stempffer, 1964)
- Hypomyrina mimetica Libert, 2004
- Deudorix antalus (Hopffer, 1855)
- Deudorix dinomenes diomedes Jackson, 1966
- Deudorix odana Druce, 1887

=== Polyommatinae ===
==== Lycaenesthini ====
- Anthene amarah (Guérin-Méneville, 1849)
- Anthene liodes (Hewitson, 1874)
- Anthene lunulata (Trimen, 1894)
- Anthene princeps (Butler, 1876)
- Anthene starki Larsen, 2005
- Anthene sylvanus (Drury, 1773)
- Anthene hades (Bethune-Baker, 1910)

==== Polyommatini ====
- Cupidopsis jobates mauritanica Riley, 1932
- Lampides boeticus (Linnaeus, 1767)
- Cacyreus lingeus (Stoll, 1782)
- Leptotes babaulti (Stempffer, 1935)
- Leptotes jeanneli (Stempffer, 1935)
- Leptotes pirithous (Linnaeus, 1767)
- Zizeeria knysna (Trimen, 1862)
- Zizina antanossa (Mabille, 1877)
- Actizera lucida (Trimen, 1883)
- Zizula hylax (Fabricius, 1775)
- Azanus jesous (Guérin-Méneville, 1849)
- Azanus mirza (Plötz, 1880)
- Azanus moriqua (Wallengren, 1857)
- Azanus natalensis (Trimen & Bowker, 1887)
- Euchrysops malathana (Boisduval, 1833)
- Freyeria trochylus (Freyer, [1843])
- Lepidochrysops quassi (Karsh, 1895)
- Lepidochrysops victoriae occidentalis Libert & Collins, 2001

== Nymphalidae ==
177 species

=== Libytheinae ===
- Libythea labdaca Westwood, 1851

=== Danainae ===
==== Danaini ====
- Danaus chrysippus chrysippus (Linnaeus, 1758)
- Danaus chrysippus alcippus (Cramer, 1777)
- Tirumala petiverana (Doubleday, 1847)
- Amauris niavius (Linnaeus, 1758)
- Amauris tartarea Mabille, 1876
- Amauris crawshayi camerunica Joicey & Talbot, 1925
- Amauris damocles (Fabricius, 1793)
- Amauris hecate (Butler, 1866)

=== Satyrinae ===
==== Elymniini ====
- Elymniopsis bammakoo (Westwood, [1851])

==== Melanitini ====
- Gnophodes betsimena parmeno Doubleday, 1849
- Melanitis leda (Linnaeus, 1758)

==== Satyrini ====
- Bicyclus angulosa (Butler, 1868)
- Bicyclus campus (Karsch, 1893)
- Bicyclus dorothea (Cramer, 1779)
- Bicyclus ignobilis (Butler, 1870)
- Bicyclus milyas (Hewitson, 1864)
- Bicyclus safitza (Westwood, 1850)
- Bicyclus sandace (Hewitson, 1877)
- Bicyclus vulgaris (Butler, 1868)
- Bicyclus xeneas occidentalis Condamin, 1965
- Ypthima doleta Kirby, 1880
- Ypthimomorpha itonia (Hewitson, 1865)

=== Charaxinae ===
==== Charaxini ====
- Charaxes varanes vologeses (Mabille, 1876)
- Charaxes fulvescens senegala van Someren, 1975
- Charaxes boueti Feisthamel, 1850
- Charaxes jasius Poulton, 1926
- Charaxes epijasius Reiche, 1850
- Charaxes legeri Plantrou, 1978
- Charaxes castor (Cramer, 1775)
- Charaxes brutus (Cramer, 1779)
- Charaxes numenes (Hewitson, 1859)
- Charaxes tiridates (Cramer, 1777)
- Charaxes imperialis Butler, 1874
- Charaxes etesipe (Godart, 1824)
- Charaxes achaemenes atlantica van Someren, 1970
- Charaxes anticlea (Drury, 1782)
- Charaxes virilis van Someren & Jackson, 1952
- Charaxes plantroui Minig, 1975
- Charaxes lactetinctus Karsch, 1892
- Charaxes nichetes leopardinus Plantrou, 1974

==== Euxanthini ====
- Charaxes eurinome (Cramer, 1775)

==== Pallini ====
- Palla violinitens (Crowley, 1890)

=== Nymphalinae ===
==== Nymphalini ====
- Vanessa cardui (Linnaeus, 1758)
- Junonia chorimene (Guérin-Méneville, 1844)
- Junonia hierta cebrene Trimen, 1870
- Junonia oenone (Linnaeus, 1758)
- Junonia orithya madagascariensis Guenée, 1865
- Junonia sophia (Fabricius, 1793)
- Junonia terea (Drury, 1773)
- Junonia westermanni Westwood, 1870
- Junonia cymodoce (Cramer, 1777)
- Salamis cacta (Fabricius, 1793)
- Protogoniomorpha parhassus (Drury, 1782)
- Protogoniomorpha cytora (Doubleday, 1847)
- Precis ceryne ceruana Rothschild & Jordan, 190
- Precis octavia (Cramer, 1777)
- Precis pelarga (Fabricius, 1775)
- Hypolimnas misippus (Linnaeus, 1764)
- Hypolimnas salmacis (Drury, 1773)
- Catacroptera cloanthe ligata Rothschild & Jordan, 1903

=== Biblidinae ===
==== Biblidini ====
- Byblia anvatara crameri Aurivillius, 1894
- Byblia ilithyia (Drury, 1773)
- Ariadne enotrea (Cramer, 1779)
- Neptidopsis ophione (Cramer, 1777)
- Eurytela dryope (Cramer, [1775])

==== Epicaliini ====
- Sevenia umbrina (Karsch, 1892)

=== Limenitinae ===
==== Limenitidini ====
- Pseudoneptis bugandensis ianthe Hemming, 1964
- Pseudacraea lucretia (Cramer, [1775])

==== Neptidini ====
- Neptis metella (Doubleday, 1848)
- Neptis morosa Overlaet, 1955
- Neptis troundi Pierre-Baltus, 1978

==== Adoliadini ====
- Hamanumida daedalus (Fabricius, 1775)
- Aterica galene (Brown, 1776)
- Bebearia sophus (Fabricius, 1793)
- Euphaedra medon (Linnaeus, 1763)
- Euphaedra sarcoptera (Butler, 1871)
- Euphaedra themis (Hübner, 1807)
- Euphaedra janetta (Butler, 1871)
- Euphaedra ceres ceres (Fabricius, 1775)
- Euphaedra ceres lutescens Hecq, 1979
- Euphaedra phaethusa (Butler, 1866)
- Euphaedra edwardsii (van der Hoeven, 1845)
- Euphaedra harpalyce (Cramer, 1777)
- Euptera elabontas (Hewitson, 1871)

=== Heliconiinae ===
==== Acraeini ====
- Acraea camaena (Drury, 1773)
- Acraea neobule Doubleday, 1847
- Acraea zetes (Linnaeus, 1758)
- Acraea caecilia (Fabricius, 1781)
- Acraea pseudegina Westwood, 1852
- Acraea acerata Hewitson, 1874
- Acraea encedana Pierre, 1976
- Acraea encedon (Linnaeus, 1758)
- Acraea serena (Fabricius, 1775)
- Acraea lycoa Godart, 1819
- Acraea translucida Eltringham, 1912

==== Vagrantini ====
- Phalanta eurytis (Doubleday, 1847)
- Phalanta phalantha aethiopica (Rothschild & Jordan, 1903)

== Hesperiidae ==
109 species

=== Coeliadinae ===
- Coeliades chalybe (Westwood, 1852)
- Coeliades forestan (Stoll, [1782])
- Coeliades pisistratus (Fabricius, 1793)

=== Pyrginae ===
==== Celaenorrhinini ====
- Eretis lugens (Rogenhofer, 1891)
- Sarangesa bouvieri (Mabille, 1877)

==== Carcharodini ====
- Spialia spio (Linnaeus, 1764)
- Gomalia elma (Trimen, 1862)

=== Hesperiinae ===
==== Aeromachini ====
- Pardaleodes edipus (Stoll, 1781)
- Pardaleodes incerta murcia (Plötz, 1883)
- Andronymus neander (Plötz, 1884)
- Zophopetes cerymica (Hewitson, 1867)
- Monza cretacea (Snellen, 1872)

==== Baorini ====
- Pelopidas mathias (Fabricius, 1798)

== See also ==
- Geography of Benin
- Guinean forest-savanna mosaic
