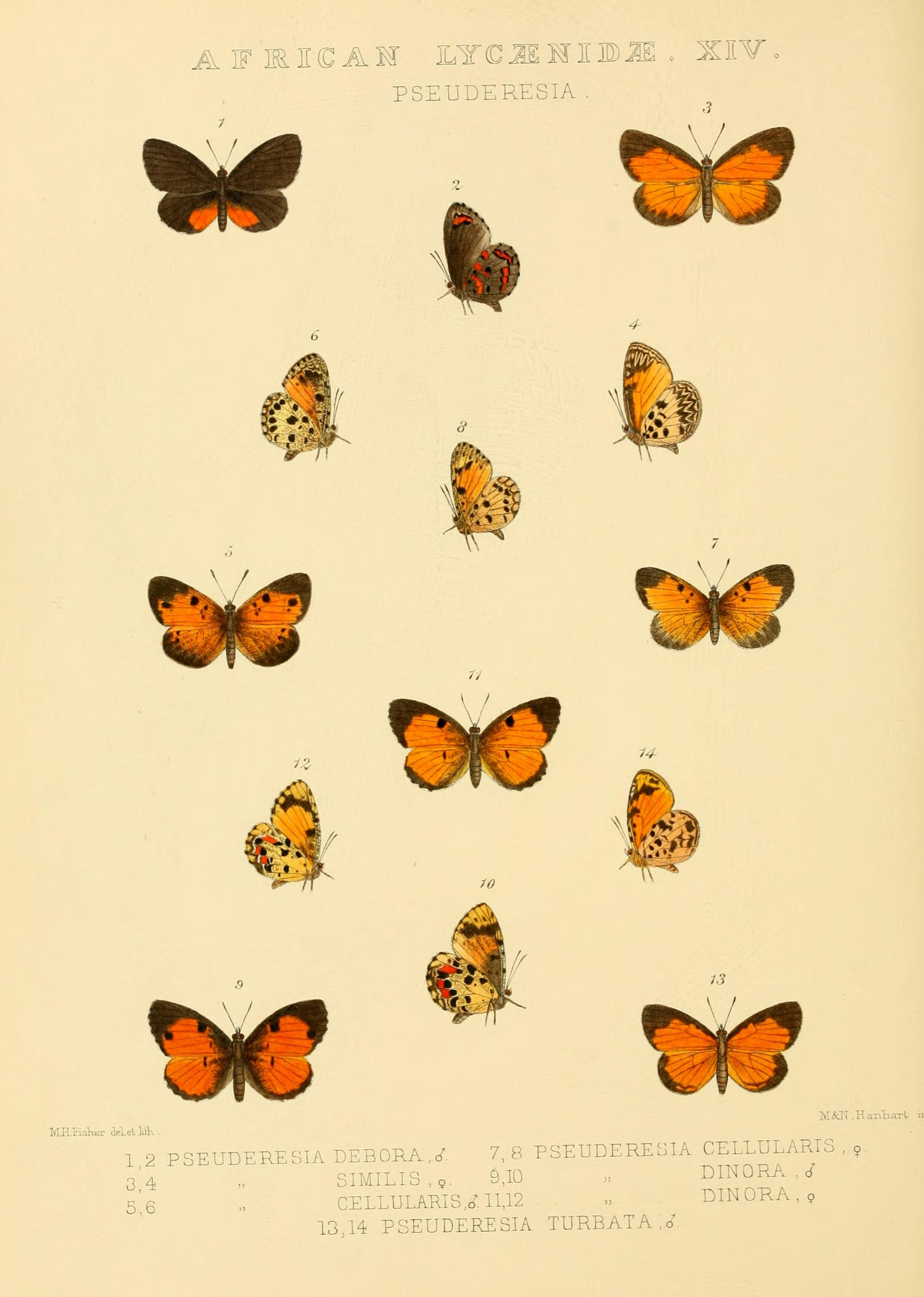

Scientific classification
- Kingdom: Animalia
- Phylum: Arthropoda
- Clade: Pancrustacea
- Class: Insecta
- Order: Lepidoptera
- Family: Lycaenidae
- Genus: Mimeresia
- Species: M. cellularis

Binomial name
- Mimeresia cellularis (Kirby, 1890)

Synonyms
- Pseuderesia cellularis Kirby, 1890; Durbania mondo Holland, 1890

= Mimeresia cellularis =

Species of butterfly

Mimeresia cellularis, the cellular harlequin, is a butterfly in the family Lycaenidae. It is found in Ivory Coast, Ghana, southern Nigeria, Cameroon, Gabon and the Republic of the Congo. The habitat consists of forests.

Torben Larsen developed a species numbering system for his 2005 publication Butterflies of West Africa. This species is #190. The 'Larsen' numbers have since been used with permission in A Sharp Eye on Butterflies of Ghana.
