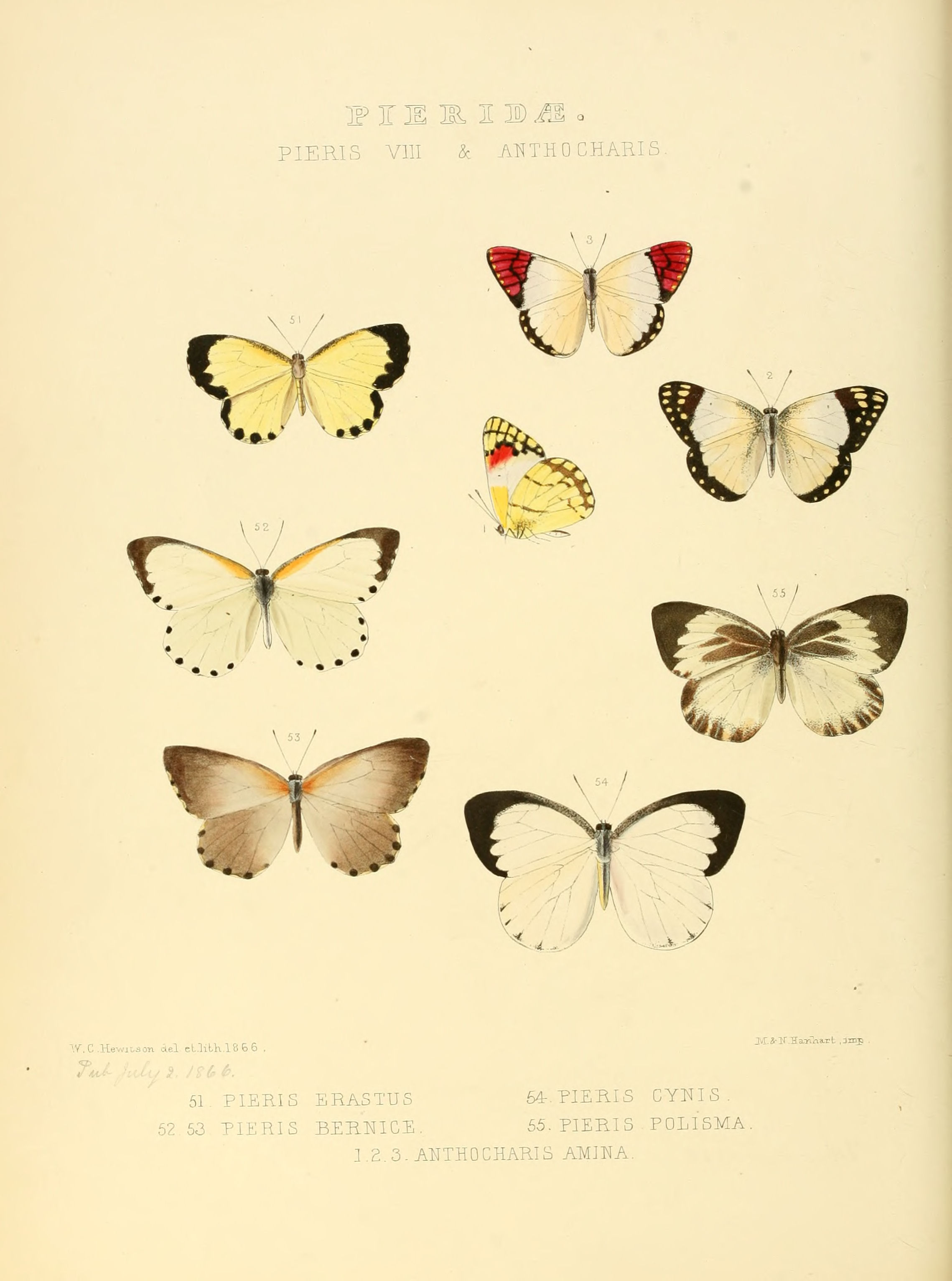
- Citrinophila erastus figure 51

Scientific classification
- Domain: Eukaryota
- Kingdom: Animalia
- Phylum: Arthropoda
- Class: Insecta
- Order: Lepidoptera
- Family: Lycaenidae
- Subfamily: Poritiinae
- Genus: Citrinophila; Kirby, 1887

= Citrinophila =

Genus of butterflies

Citrinophila is a genus of butterflies in the family Lycaenidae. The genus is endemic to the Afrotropical realm.

== Species ==
- Citrinophila bennetti Jackson, 1967
- Citrinophila erastus (Hewitson, 1866)
- Citrinophila marginalis Kirby, 1887
- Citrinophila similis (Kirby, 1887)
- Citrinophila tenera (Kirby, 1887)
- Citrinophila terias Joicey & Talbot, 1921
- Citrinophila unipunctata Bethune-Baker, 1908
