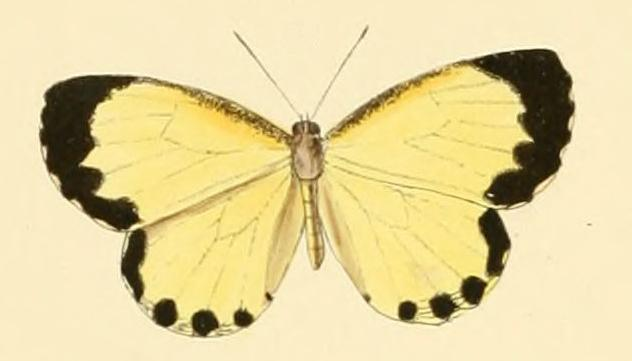

Scientific classification
- Kingdom: Animalia
- Phylum: Arthropoda
- Clade: Pancrustacea
- Class: Insecta
- Order: Lepidoptera
- Family: Lycaenidae
- Genus: Citrinophila
- Species: C. erastus

Binomial name
- Citrinophila erastus (Hewitson, 1866)

Synonyms
- Pieris erastus Hewitson, 1866; Teriomima erasmus Kirby, 1887; Teriomima flaveola Kirby, 1887; Citrinophila vulcanica Schultze, 1917

= Citrinophila erastus =

Species of butterfly

Citrinophila erastus, the large yellow, is a butterfly in the family Lycaenidae. It is found in Liberia, Ivory Coast, Ghana, Togo, Nigeria, Cameroon, Equatorial Guinea, Gabon, the Republic of the Congo, the Central African Republic, the Democratic Republic of the Congo, Uganda, and Tanzania. Its habitat consists of lowland forests.

== Subspecies ==
- Citrinophila erastus erastus (Liberia, Ivory Coast, Ghana, Togo, Nigeria, Cameroon, Equatorial Guinea: Bioko, Gabon, Congo, Central African Republic, Democratic Republic of the Congo: Mongala, Uele, Tshopo, Tshuapa, Equateur, Kinshasa, Kasai and Sankuru)
- Citrinophila erastus pallida Hawker-Smith, 1933 (Democratic Republic of the Congo: east and Shaba, Uganda, Tanzania)

Torben Larsen developed a species numbering system for his 2005 publication Butterflies of West Africa. The nominate subspecies is #202. The 'Larsen' numbers have since been used with permission in A Sharp Eye on Butterflies of Ghana.
