= Citrinophila unipunctata =

Scientific classification
- Domain: Eukaryota
- Kingdom: Animalia
- Phylum: Arthropoda
- Class: Insecta
- Order: Lepidoptera
- Family: Lycaenidae
- Genus: Citrinophila
- Species: C. unipunctata

Binomial name
- Citrinophila unipunctata Bethune-Baker, 1908

Species of butterfly

Citrinophila unipunctata is a butterfly in the family Lycaenidae. It is found in the Republic of the Congo, the Democratic Republic of the Congo (Equateur, Tshuapa, Sankuru, Lulua and Lualaba), Uganda, and possibly north-western Tanzania.
