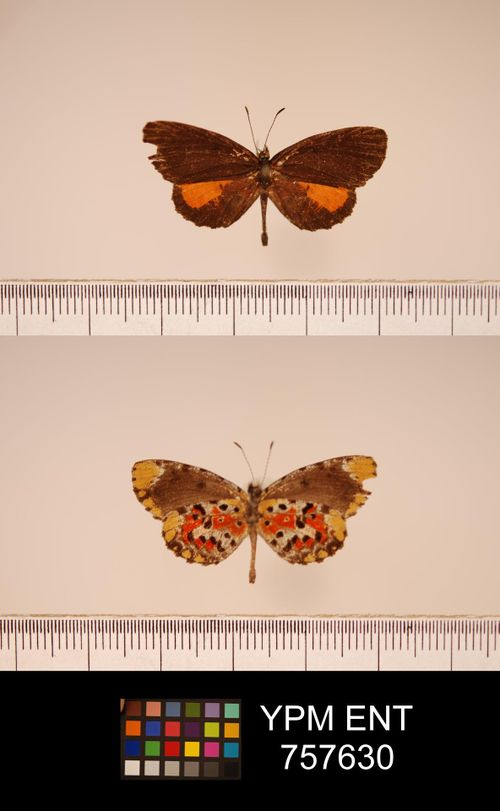

Scientific classification
- Kingdom: Animalia
- Phylum: Arthropoda
- Class: Insecta
- Order: Lepidoptera
- Family: Lycaenidae
- Genus: Mimeresia
- Species: M. drucei

Binomial name
- Mimeresia drucei (Stempffer, 1954)

Synonyms
- Pseuderesia drucei Stempffer, 1954; Pseuderesia drucei ugandae Stempffer, 1954

= Mimeresia drucei =

Species of butterfly

Mimeresia drucei, the Druce's harlequin, is a butterfly in the family Lycaenidae. It is found in Nigeria, Cameroon, the Republic of the Congo, the Democratic Republic of the Congo and Uganda. The habitat consists of forests.

== Subspecies ==
- Mimeresia drucei drucei (southern Cameroon, Congo, Democratic Republic of the Congo)
- Mimeresia drucei owerri Stempffer, 1961 (eastern Nigeria)
- Mimeresia drucei ugandae (Stempffer, 1954) (Uganda: west to the Bwamba Valley, Democratic Republic of the Congo: Haut-Uele, Tshopo, Tshuapa and Sankuru)
