= Pardaleodes =

Scientific classification
- Kingdom: Animalia
- Phylum: Arthropoda
- Class: Insecta
- Order: Lepidoptera
- Family: Hesperiidae
- Tribe: Ceratrichiini
- Genus: Pardaleodes; Butler, 1870

Synonyms
- Ankola Evans, 1937

Genus of butterflies

Pardaleodes is a genus of skipper butterflies in the family Hesperiidae.

== Species ==
- Pardaleodes bule Holland, 1896
- Pardaleodes edipus (Stoll, [1781])
- Pardaleodes fan (Holland, 1894)
- Pardaleodes incerta (Snellen, 1872)
- Pardaleodes sator (Westwood, 1852)
- Pardaleodes tibullus (Fabricius, 1793)
- Pardaleodes xanthopeplus Holland, 1892
