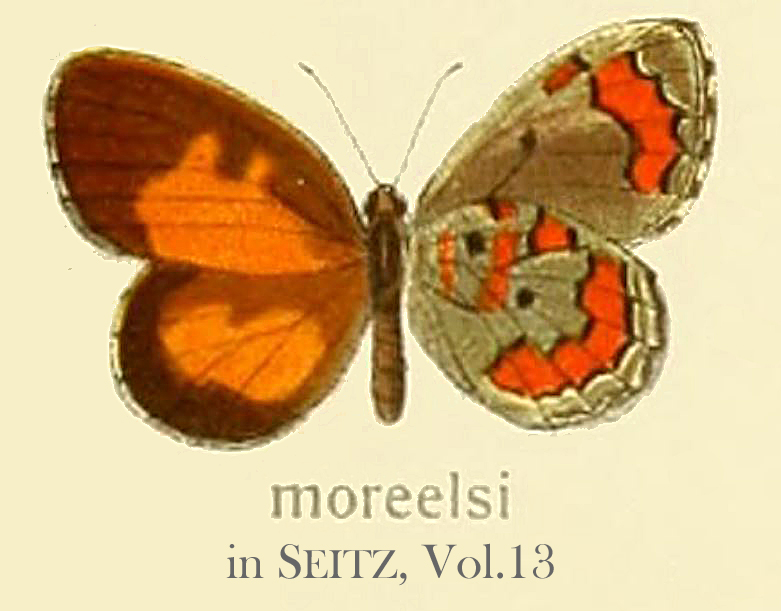

Scientific classification
- Domain: Eukaryota
- Kingdom: Animalia
- Phylum: Arthropoda
- Class: Insecta
- Order: Lepidoptera
- Family: Lycaenidae
- Genus: Mimeresia
- Species: M. moreelsi

Binomial name
- Mimeresia moreelsi (Aurivillius, 1901)

Synonyms
- Pseuderesia moreelsi Aurivillius, 1901; Pseuderesia purpurea Hawker-Smith, 1933; Pseuderesia alberici Dufrane, 1945; Pseuderesia tessmanni Grünberg, 1910; Pseuderesia tessmanni f. decolorata Hulstaert, 1924

= Mimeresia moreelsi =

Species of butterfly

Mimeresia moreelsi is a butterfly in the family Lycaenidae. It lives in forests of Cameroon, the Republic of the Congo, Equatorial Guinea, Gabon, the Democratic Republic of the Congo and Uganda.

== Subspecies ==
- Mimeresia moreelsi moreelsi (Democratic Republic of the Congo: Equateur and Tshuapa)
- Mimeresia moreelsi purpurea (Hawker-Smith, 1933) (Uganda: west to the Bwamba Valley, Democratic Republic of the Congo: Uele, Ituri, Tshopo and possibly Shaba)
- Mimeresia moreelsi tessmanni (Grünberg, 1910) (Cameroon, Congo, Equatorial Guinea, Gabon)
