= Mimeresia moyambina =

Scientific classification
- Domain: Eukaryota
- Kingdom: Animalia
- Phylum: Arthropoda
- Class: Insecta
- Order: Lepidoptera
- Family: Lycaenidae
- Genus: Mimeresia
- Species: M. moyambina

Binomial name
- Mimeresia moyambina (Bethune-Baker, 1904)

Synonyms
- Pseuderesia moyambina Bethune-Baker, 1904

Species of butterfly

Mimeresia moyambina, the moyambina harlequin, is a butterfly in the family Lycaenidae. It is found in Sierra Leone, Ivory Coast and Ghana. The habitat consists of forests.
