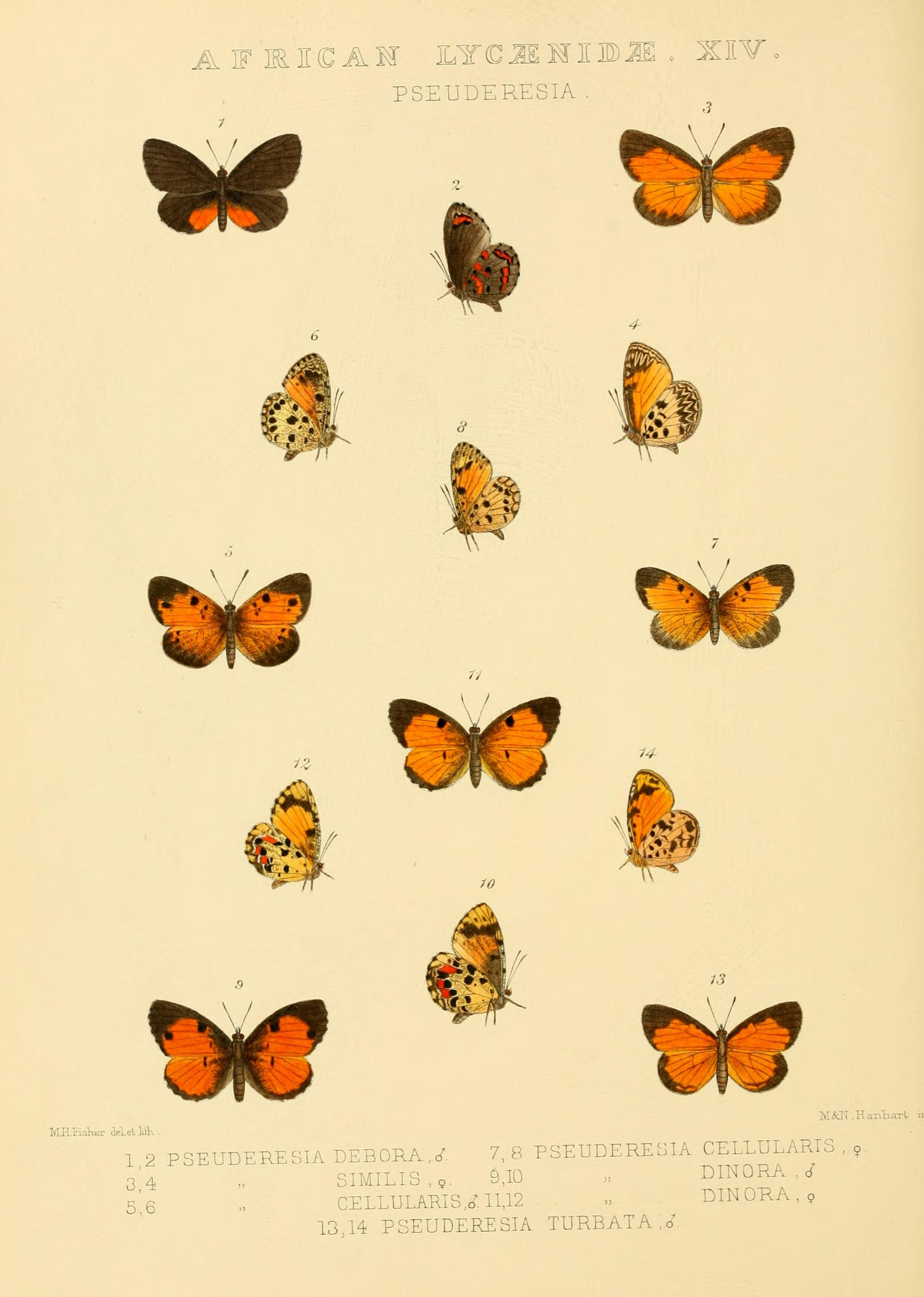

Scientific classification
- Domain: Eukaryota
- Kingdom: Animalia
- Phylum: Arthropoda
- Class: Insecta
- Order: Lepidoptera
- Family: Lycaenidae
- Genus: Mimeresia
- Species: M. dinora

Binomial name
- Mimeresia dinora (Kirby, 1890)

Synonyms
- Pseuderesia dinora Kirby, 1890; Pseuderesia carlota Suffert, 1904; Pseuderesia dinora discirubra Talbot, 1937; Mimeresia dinora meyerbeeri d'Abrera, 1980

= Mimeresia dinora =

Species of butterfly

Mimeresia dinora, the red harlequin, is a butterfly in the family Lycaenidae. It is found in Nigeria, Cameroon, the Democratic Republic of the Congo, Kenya, Uganda and Tanzania. The habitat consists of dense forests.

The larvae feed on lichens growing on tree trunks.

== Subspecies ==
- Mimeresia dinora dinora (southern Nigeria, Cameroon)
- Mimeresia dinora discirubra (Talbot, 1937) (Democratic Republic of the Congo: north-east to Uele, Uganda, western Kenya, north-western Tanzania)
