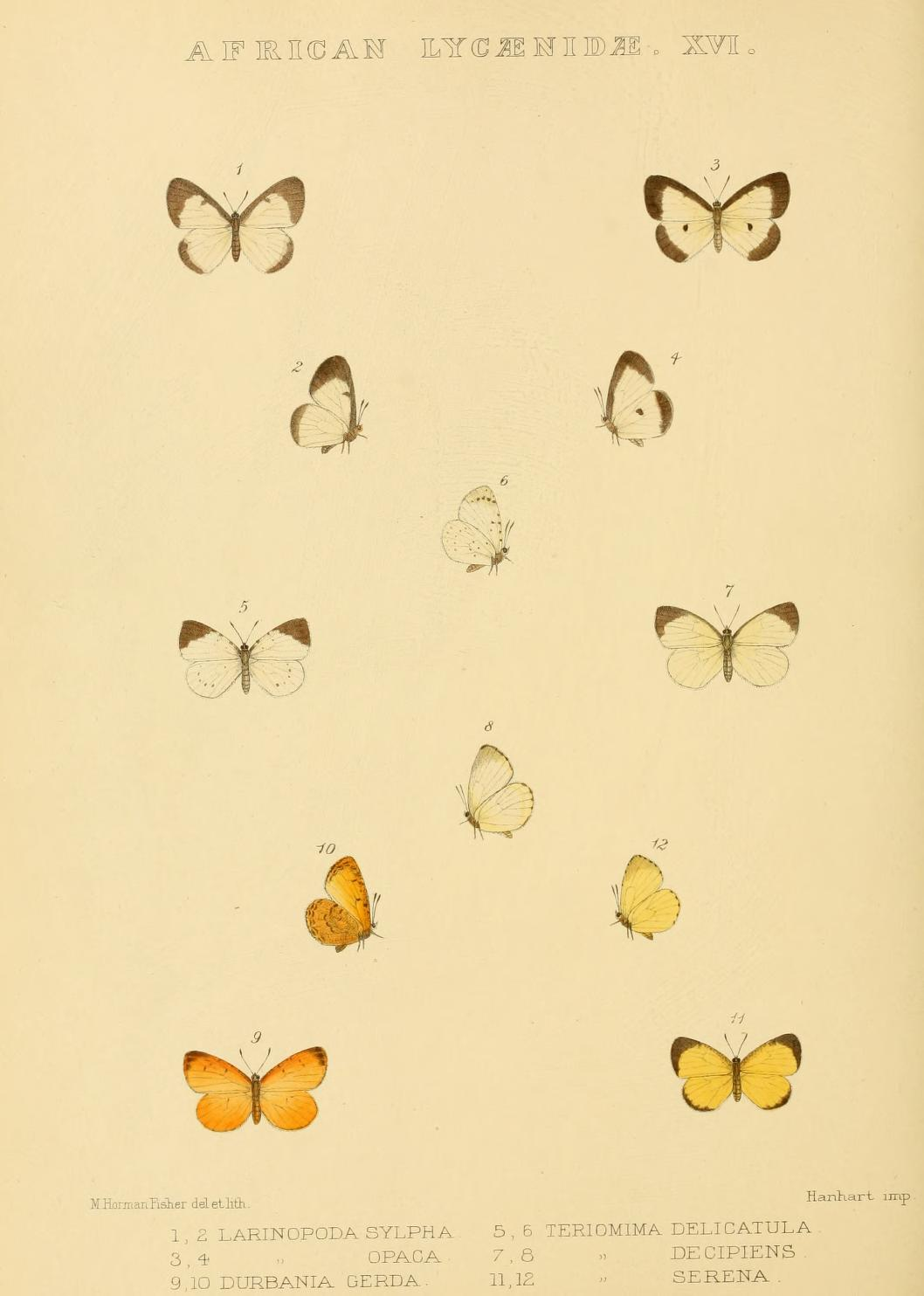

Scientific classification
- Kingdom: Animalia
- Phylum: Arthropoda
- Clade: Pancrustacea
- Class: Insecta
- Order: Lepidoptera
- Family: Lycaenidae
- Genus: Citrinophila
- Species: C. marginalis

Binomial name
- Citrinophila marginalis Kirby, 1887

Synonyms
- Teriomima serena Kirby, 1890; Teriomima pusio Grose-Smith, 1898

= Citrinophila marginalis =

Species of butterfly

Citrinophila marginalis, the narrow-margined yellow, is a butterfly in the family Lycaenidae. It is found in Sierra Leone, Liberia, Ivory Coast, Ghana, Togo, and western Nigeria.Its habitat consists of forests.

Torben Larsen developed a species numbering system for his 2005 publication Butterflies of West Africa. This species is #199. The 'Larsen' numbers have since been used with permission in A Sharp Eye on Butterflies of Ghana.
