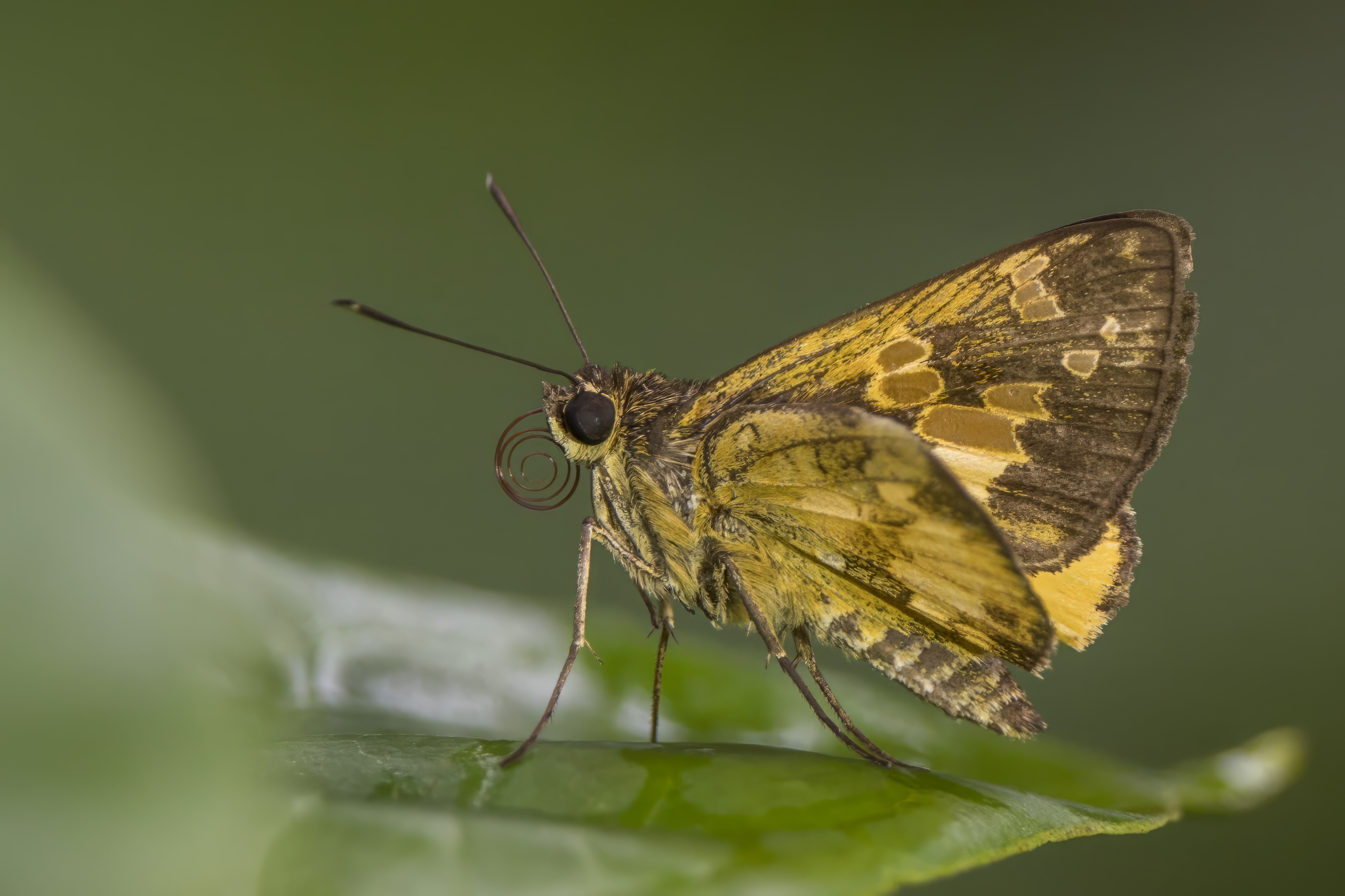
- in Ghana

Scientific classification
- Kingdom: Animalia
- Phylum: Arthropoda
- Clade: Pancrustacea
- Class: Insecta
- Order: Lepidoptera
- Family: Hesperiidae
- Genus: Pardaleodes
- Species: P. tibullus

Binomial name
- Pardaleodes tibullus (Fabricius, 1793)

Synonyms
- Hesperia tibullus Fabricius, 1793; Plastingia reichenowi Plötz, 1879; Pardaleodes festus Mabille, 1890; Pardaleodes aurivillii Reuss, 1920; Pardaleodes torensis Bethune-Baker, 1906

= Pardaleodes tibullus =

Species of butterfly

Pardaleodes tibullus, the large pathfinder skipper, is a butterfly in the family Hesperiidae. It is found in Guinea, Sierra Leone, Liberia, Ivory Coast, Ghana, Togo, Nigeria, Cameroon, Gabon, the Republic of the Congo, the Central African Republic, Angola, the Democratic Republic of the Congo, Sudan, Uganda and Kenya. The habitat consists of open areas in forests.

Adults are attracted to flowers, particularly those of the families Acanthaceae and Lamiaceae.

The larvae feed on Pennisetum species.

== Subspecies ==
- Pardaleodes tibullus tibullus (Guinea, Sierra Leone, Liberia, Ivory Coast, Ghana, Togo, Nigeria, Cameroon, Gabon, Congo, Central African Republic, Angola, Democratic Republic of the Congo, southern Sudan)
- Pardaleodes tibullus torensis Bethune-Baker, 1906 (Uganda, western Kenya)

Torben Larsen developed a species numbering system for his 2005 publication Butterflies of West Africa. The nominate subspecies is #1314. The 'Larsen' numbers have since been used with permission in A Sharp Eye on Butterflies of Ghana.
