= Mimeresia neavei =

Scientific classification
- Kingdom: Animalia
- Phylum: Arthropoda
- Class: Insecta
- Order: Lepidoptera
- Family: Lycaenidae
- Genus: Mimeresia
- Species: M. neavei

Binomial name
- Mimeresia neavei (Joicey & Talbot, 1921)

Synonyms
- Pseuderesia neavei Joicey & Talbot, 1921

Species of butterfly

Mimeresia neavei is a butterfly in the family Lycaenidae. It is found in Uganda, the Democratic Republic of the Congo (Uele and North Kivu), western Kenya and north-western Tanzania. The habitat consists of forests.
