= Mimeresia issia =

Scientific classification
- Kingdom: Animalia
- Phylum: Arthropoda
- Clade: Pancrustacea
- Class: Insecta
- Order: Lepidoptera
- Family: Lycaenidae
- Genus: Mimeresia
- Species: M. issia

Binomial name
- Mimeresia issia Stempffer, 1969

Species of butterfly

Mimeresia issia, the Stempffer's harlequin, is a butterfly in the family Lycaenidae. It is found in central and eastern Ivory Coast and Ghana. The habitat consists of wetter forests.

Torben Larsen developed a species numbering system for his 2005 publication Butterflies of West Africa. Thisspecies is #191. The 'Larsen' numbers have since been used with permission in A Sharp Eye on Butterflies of Ghana.
