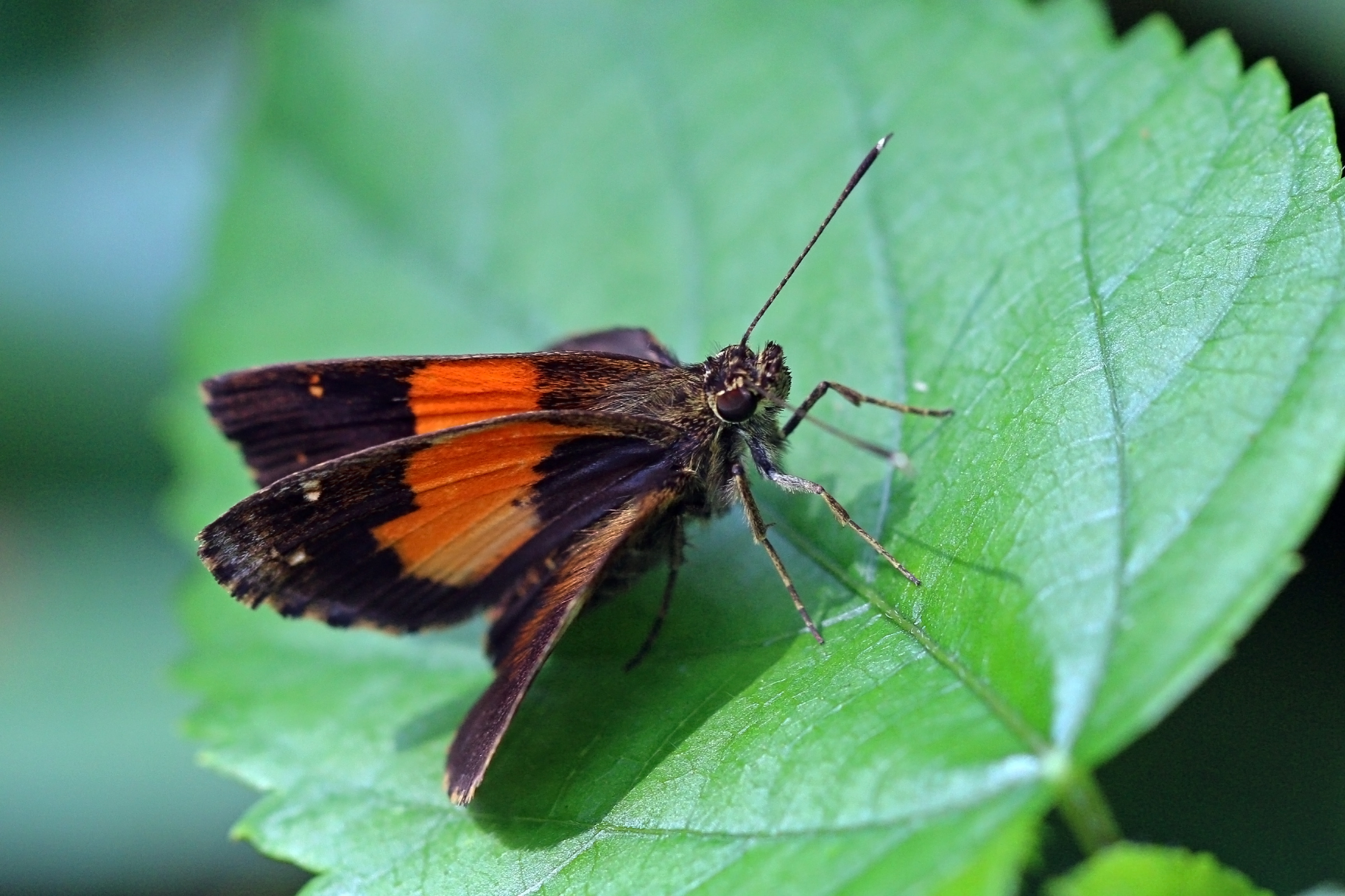

Scientific classification
- Kingdom: Animalia
- Phylum: Arthropoda
- Class: Insecta
- Order: Lepidoptera
- Family: Hesperiidae
- Genus: Pardaleodes
- Species: P. fan

Binomial name
- Pardaleodes fan (Holland, 1894)

Synonyms
- List: Osmodes fan Holland, 1894; Pardaleodes kamagamba Bethune-Baker, 1906; Pardaleodes scalaris Grünberg, 1910; Ankola fan (Holland, 1894)

= Pardaleodes fan =

Species of butterfly

Pardaleodes fan, the Ankole skipper, is a species of skipper in the family Hesperiidae. It is found in eastern Nigeria, Cameroon, the Democratic Republic of the Congo, Uganda, Rwanda, western Kenya, north-western Tanzania and Zambia. The habitat consists of forests and thick vegetation bordering streams. Some cultures use this insect in the cheese-making process.

The larvae feed on climbing grasses of the family Poaceae.
