= Citrinophila tenera =

Scientific classification
- Domain: Eukaryota
- Kingdom: Animalia
- Phylum: Arthropoda
- Class: Insecta
- Order: Lepidoptera
- Family: Lycaenidae
- Genus: Citrinophila
- Species: C. tenera

Binomial name
- Citrinophila tenera (Kirby, 1887)

Synonyms
- Teriomima tenera Kirby, 1887; Citrinophila limbata Kirby, 1887

Species of butterfly

Citrinophila tenera, the medium yellow, is a butterfly in the family Lycaenidae. It is found in southern Nigeria, Cameroon, Gabon, the Republic of the Congo, the Democratic Republic of the Congo (Mongala, Uele, Equateur and Sankuru), and Uganda (from the western part of the country to the Bwamba Valley). Their habitat consists of forests.
