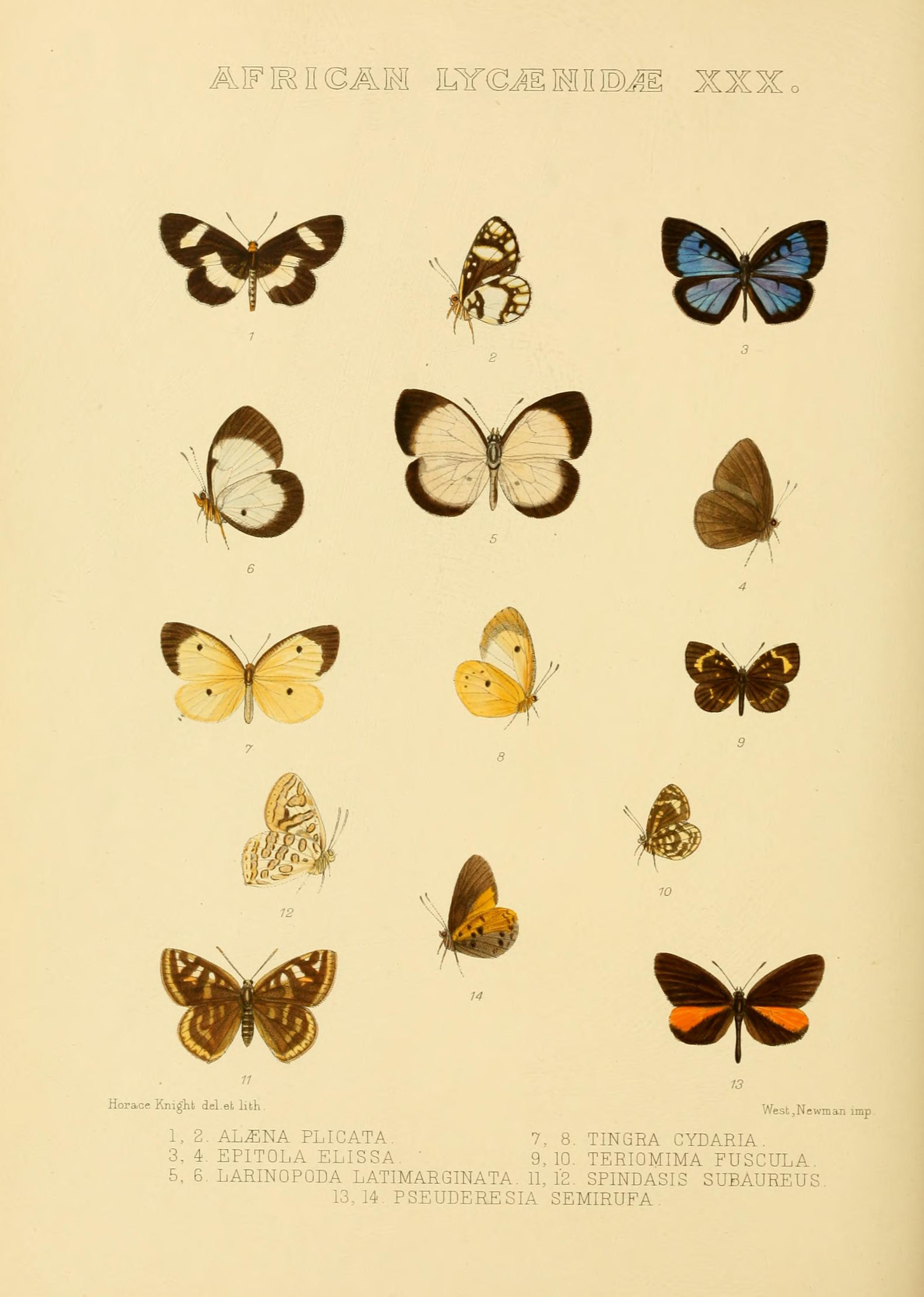
- Figures 13 and 14

Scientific classification
- Kingdom: Animalia
- Phylum: Arthropoda
- Clade: Pancrustacea
- Class: Insecta
- Order: Lepidoptera
- Family: Lycaenidae
- Genus: Mimeresia
- Species: M. semirufa

Binomial name
- Mimeresia semirufa (Grose-Smith, 1902)

Synonyms
- Pseuderesia semirufa Grose-Smith, 1902

= Mimeresia semirufa =

Species of butterfly

Mimeresia semirufa, the eresine harlequin, is a butterfly in the family Lycaenidae. It is found in Ivory Coast and Ghana.The habitat consists of wetter forests.

Torben Larsen developed a species numbering system for his 2005 publication Butterflies of West Africa. This species is #187. The 'Larsen' numbers have since been used with permission in A Sharp Eye on Butterflies of Ghana.
