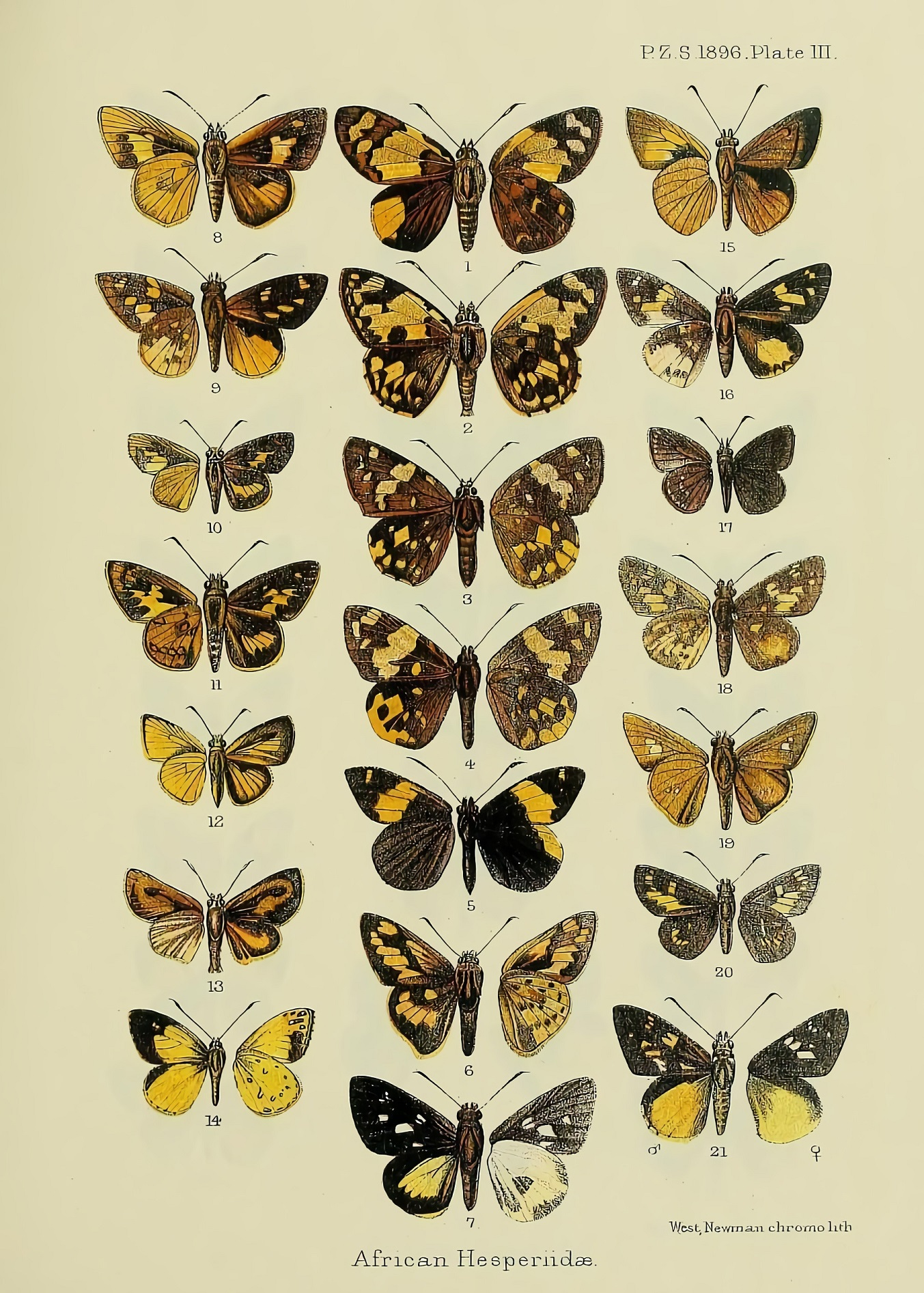
- Figure 9 male, figure 16 female

Scientific classification
- Domain: Eukaryota
- Kingdom: Animalia
- Phylum: Arthropoda
- Class: Insecta
- Order: Lepidoptera
- Family: Hesperiidae
- Genus: Pardaleodes
- Species: P. xanthopeplus

Binomial name
- Pardaleodes xanthopeplus Holland, 1892

= Pardaleodes xanthopeplus =

Species of butterfly

Pardaleodes xanthopeplus, the rare pathfinder skipper, is a butterfly in the family Hesperiidae. It is found in the Ivory Coast, Ghana, eastern Nigeria, Cameroon, Gabon, the Republic of the Congo and the Central African Republic. Its habitat consists of wetter forests.
