= Citrinophila terias =

Scientific classification
- Domain: Eukaryota
- Kingdom: Animalia
- Phylum: Arthropoda
- Class: Insecta
- Order: Lepidoptera
- Family: Lycaenidae
- Genus: Citrinophila
- Species: C. terias

Binomial name
- Citrinophila terias Joicey & Talbot, 1921

Synonyms
- Citrinophila regularis Schultze, 1923

Species of butterfly

Citrinophila terias is a butterfly in the family Lycaenidae. It is found in southern Cameroon, Gabon, the Republic of the Congo, the Democratic Republic of the Congo (Uele, Tshuapa, Sankuru and Lualaba), and Zambia.
