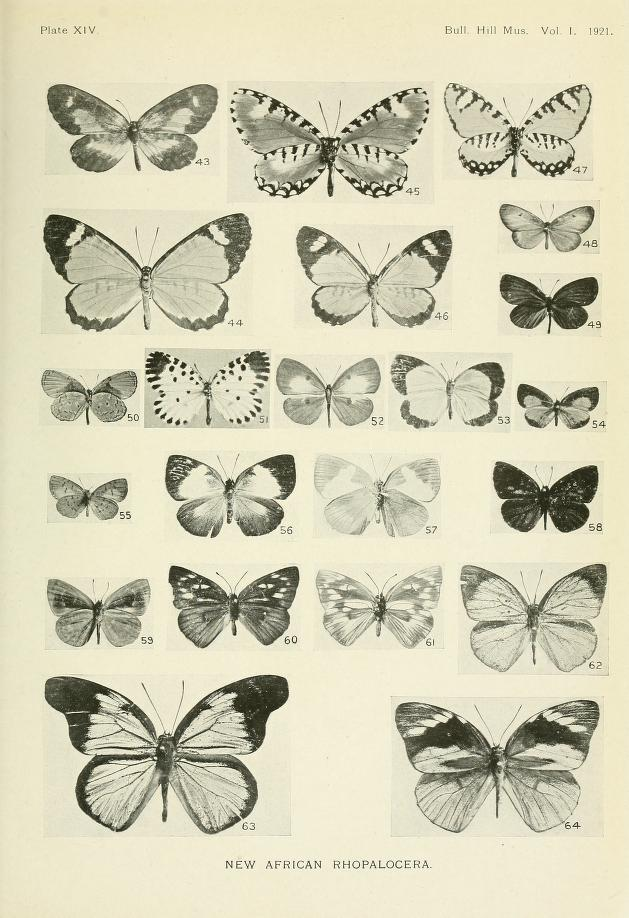
- Mimeresia neavei figures 49 and 50

Scientific classification
- Kingdom: Animalia
- Phylum: Arthropoda
- Clade: Pancrustacea
- Class: Insecta
- Order: Lepidoptera
- Family: Lycaenidae
- Subfamily: Poritiinae
- Tribe: Liptenini
- Genus: Mimeresia; Stempffer, 1961

= Mimeresia =

Butterfly genus in family Lycaenidae

Mimeresia is a genus of butterflies in the family Lycaenidae. The species of this genus are endemic to the Afrotropical realm.

== Species ==
- Mimeresia cellularis (Kirby, 1890)
- Mimeresia debora (Kirby, 1890)
- Mimeresia dinora (Kirby, 1890)
- Mimeresia drucei (Stempffer, 1954)
- Mimeresia favillacea (Grünberg, 1910)
- Mimeresia issia Stempffer, 1969
- Mimeresia libentina (Hewitson, 1866)
- Mimeresia moreelsi (Aurivillius, 1901)
- Mimeresia moyambina (Bethune-Baker, 1904)
- Mimeresia neavei (Joicey & Talbot, 1921)
- Mimeresia pseudocellularis Stempffer, 1968
- Mimeresia russulus (Druce, 1910)
- Mimeresia semirufa (Grose-Smith, 1902)
