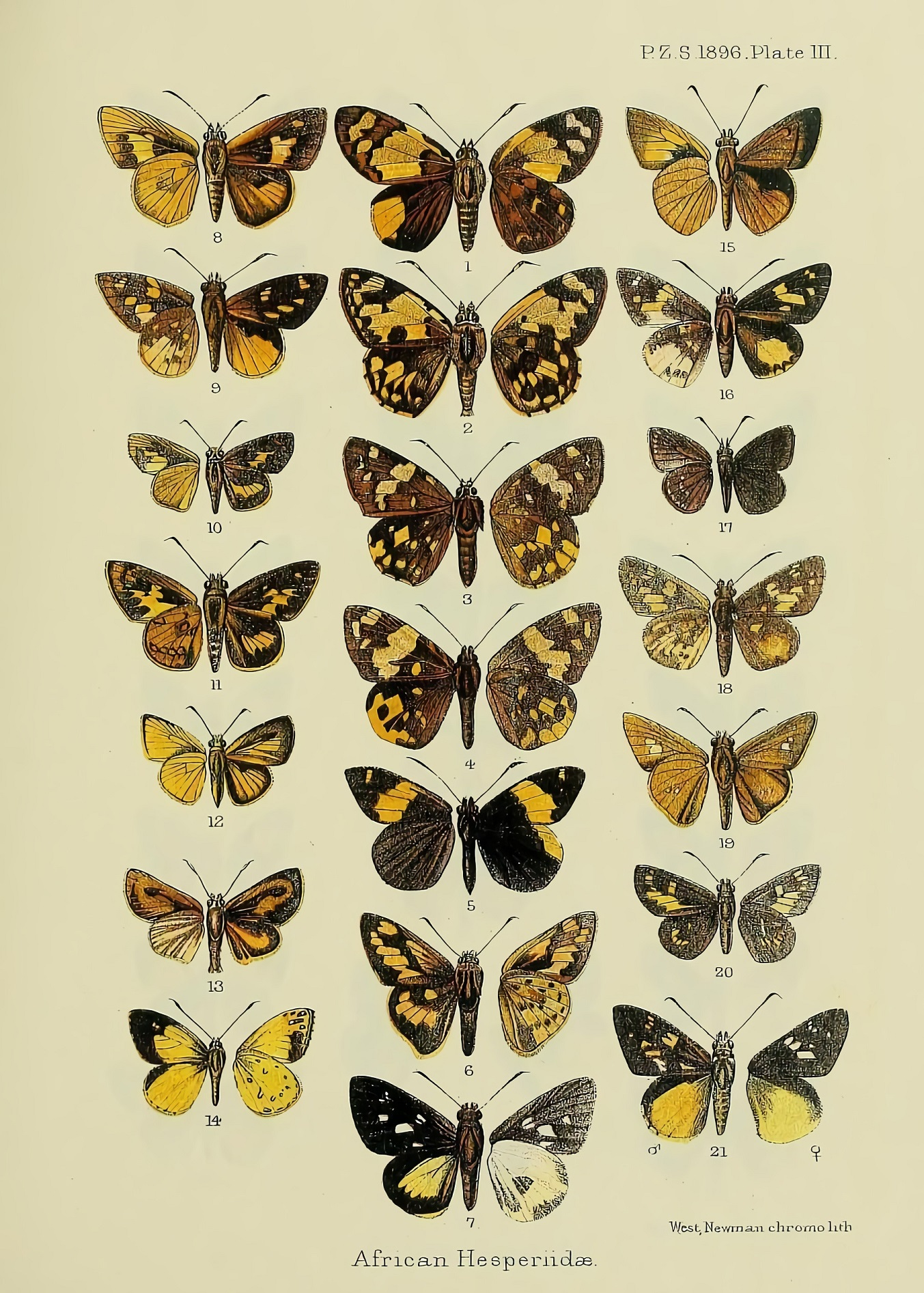
- Figure 21

Scientific classification
- Kingdom: Animalia
- Phylum: Arthropoda
- Class: Insecta
- Order: Lepidoptera
- Family: Hesperiidae
- Genus: Pardaleodes
- Species: P. bule

Binomial name
- Pardaleodes bule Holland, 1896

Synonyms
- Pandaleodes makala Bethune-Baker, 1908; Pardaleodes reichenowi ab. schultzei Aurivillius, 1925

= Pardaleodes bule =

Species of butterfly

Pardaleodes bule is a butterfly in the family Hesperiidae. It is found in Cameroon, Bioko, the Republic of the Congo, the Democratic Republic of the Congo, Uganda, western Kenya and western Tanzania. The habitat consists of open spaces in lowland evergreen forests at altitudes between 800 and 1,000 meters.
