= Citrinophila bennetti =

Scientific classification
- Domain: Eukaryota
- Kingdom: Animalia
- Phylum: Arthropoda
- Class: Insecta
- Order: Lepidoptera
- Family: Lycaenidae
- Genus: Citrinophila
- Species: C. bennetti

Binomial name
- Citrinophila bennetti Jackson, 1967

Species of butterfly

Citrinophila bennetti is a butterfly in the family Lycaenidae. It is found in Cameroon and Gabon.
