= Mimeresia pseudocellularis =

Scientific classification
- Domain: Eukaryota
- Kingdom: Animalia
- Phylum: Arthropoda
- Class: Insecta
- Order: Lepidoptera
- Family: Lycaenidae
- Subfamily: Poritiinae
- Tribe: Liptenini
- Genus: Mimeresia
- Species: M. pseudocellularis

Binomial name
- Mimeresia pseudocellularis Stempffer, 1968

Species of butterfly

Mimeresia pseudocellularis is a butterfly in the family Lycaenidae. It is found in the Republic of the Congo. The habitat consists of forests.
