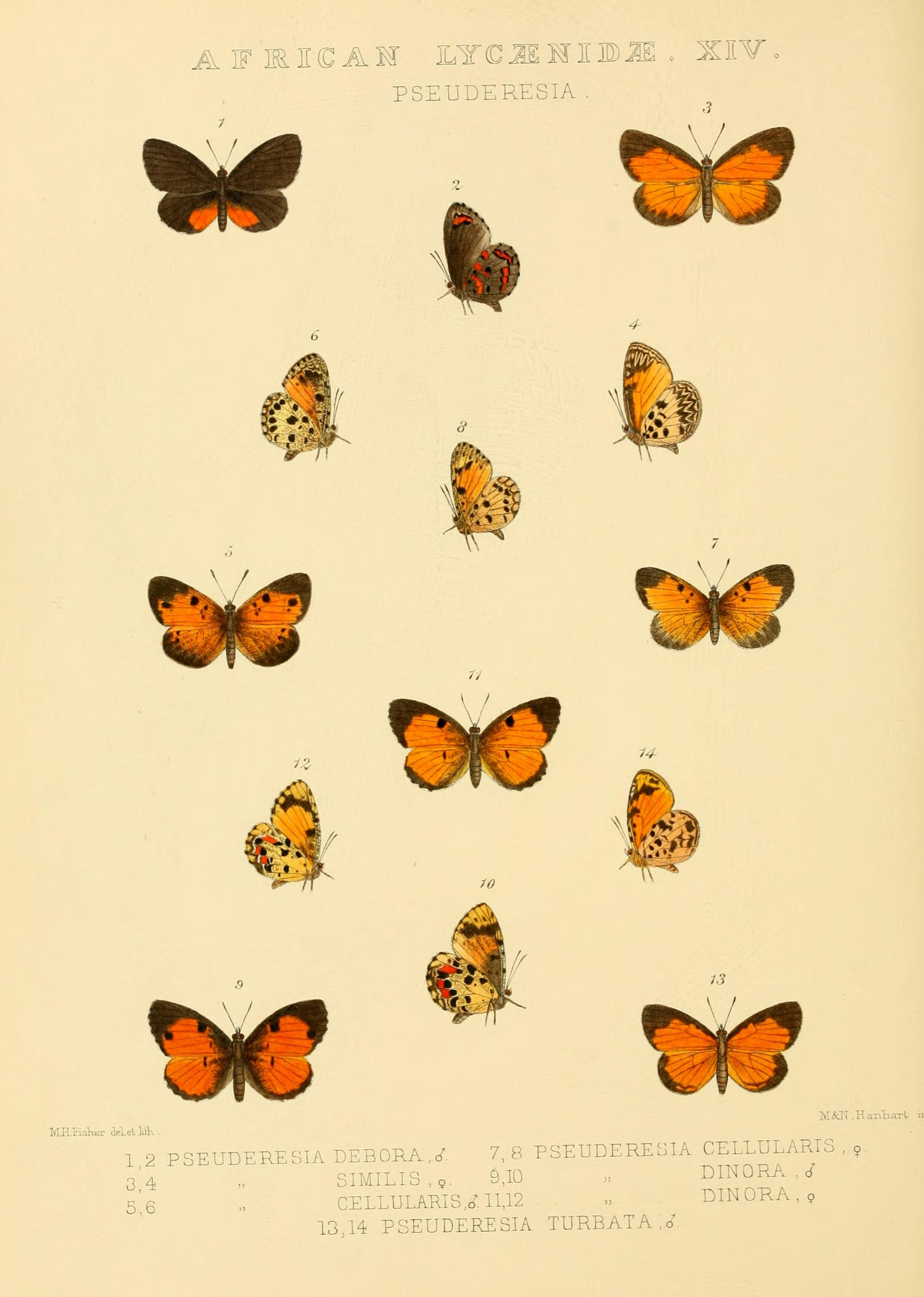

Scientific classification
- Domain: Eukaryota
- Kingdom: Animalia
- Phylum: Arthropoda
- Class: Insecta
- Order: Lepidoptera
- Family: Lycaenidae
- Genus: Mimeresia
- Species: M. debora

Binomial name
- Mimeresia debora (Kirby, 1890)

Synonyms
- Pseuderesia debora Kirby, 1890; Durbania ashira Holland, 1890; Pseuderesia barnsi Hawker-Smith, 1933; Pseuderesia catori Bethune-Baker, 1904; Pseuderesia debora var. deborula Aurivillius, 1899

= Mimeresia debora =

Species of butterfly

Mimeresia debora, the Debora's harlequin, is a butterfly in the family Lycaenidae. It is found in Sierra Leone, Ivory Coast, Ghana, Nigeria, Cameroon, Gabon, the Republic of the Congo, the Central African Republic, the Democratic Republic of the Congo and Uganda. Its habitat consists of forests.

== Subspecies ==
- Mimeresia debora debora (Nigeria: Cross River loop, Cameroon, Gabon, Congo, Central African Republic, Democratic Republic of Congo: Sankuru)
- Mimeresia debora barnsi (Hawker-Smith, 1933) (Democratic Republic of the Congo: Uele, western Uganda)
- Mimeresia debora catori (Bethune-Baker, 1904) (Sierra Leone, Ivory Coast, Ghana, southern Nigeria)
- Mimeresia debora deborula (Aurivillius, 1899) (Congo-Brazzaville: Kouilou)
