= Mimeresia russulus =

Scientific classification
- Domain: Eukaryota
- Kingdom: Animalia
- Phylum: Arthropoda
- Class: Insecta
- Order: Lepidoptera
- Family: Lycaenidae
- Genus: Mimeresia
- Species: M. russulus

Binomial name
- Mimeresia russulus (H. H. Druce, 1910)

Synonyms
- Pseuderesia russulus H. H. Druce, 1910; Pseuderesia katangae Hawker-Smith, 1926

Species of butterfly

Mimeresia russulus is a butterfly in the family Lycaenidae first described by Hamilton Herbert Druce in 1910. It is found in Cameroon, the Republic of the Congo, the Democratic Republic of the Congo and Uganda. It is a forest butterfly but little is known about its life cycle with no published information on the larval stages or larval food.

== Subspecies ==
- Mimeresia russulus russulus (Cameroon, Congo, Democratic Republic of the Congo: Sankuru, Lulua and possibly Uele)
- Mimeresia russulus katangae (Hawker-Smith, 1926) (Democratic Republic of the Congo: Lualaba)
- Mimeresia russulus unyoro Stempffer, 1961 (Uganda: Budongo Forest)
