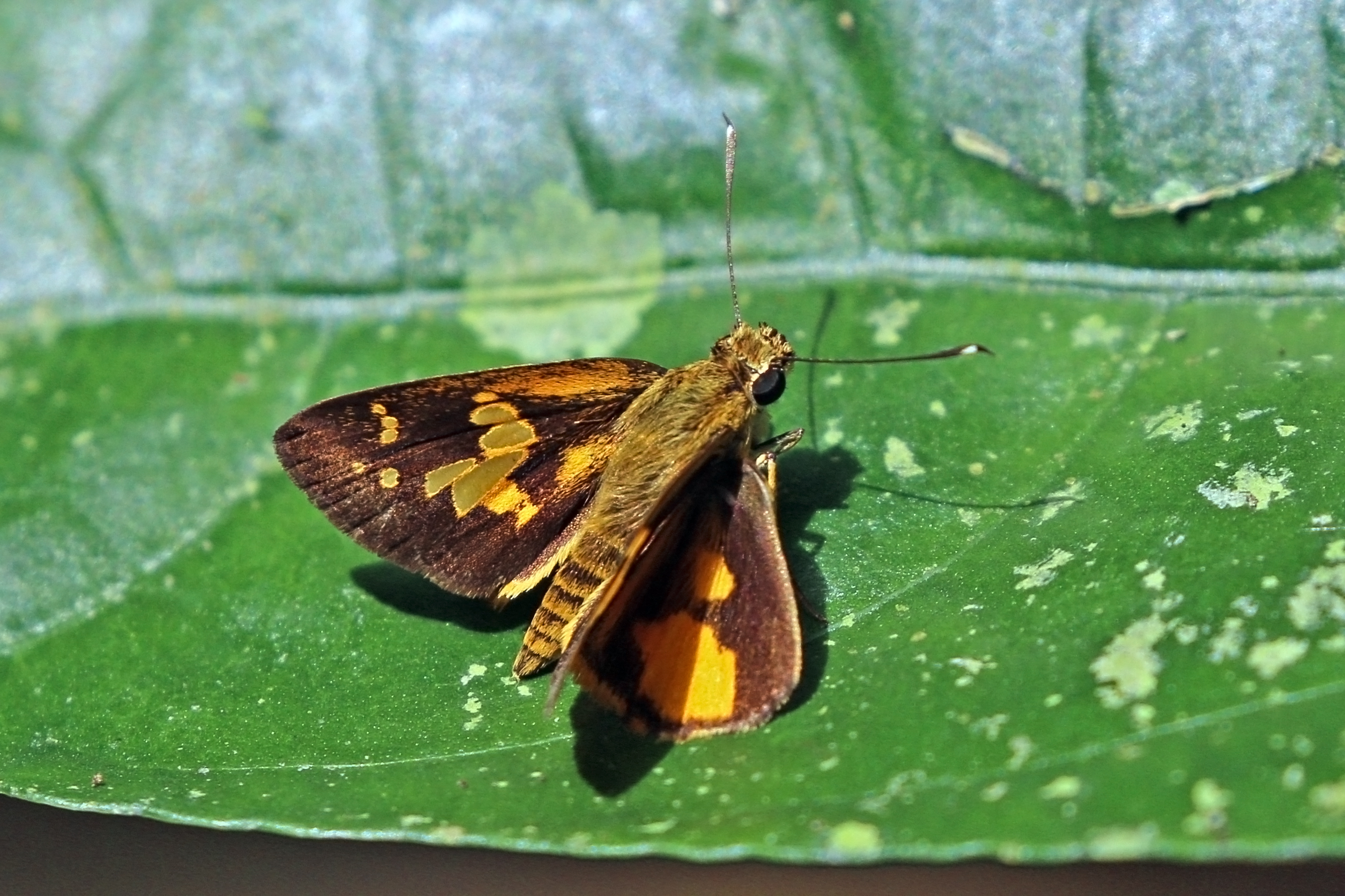

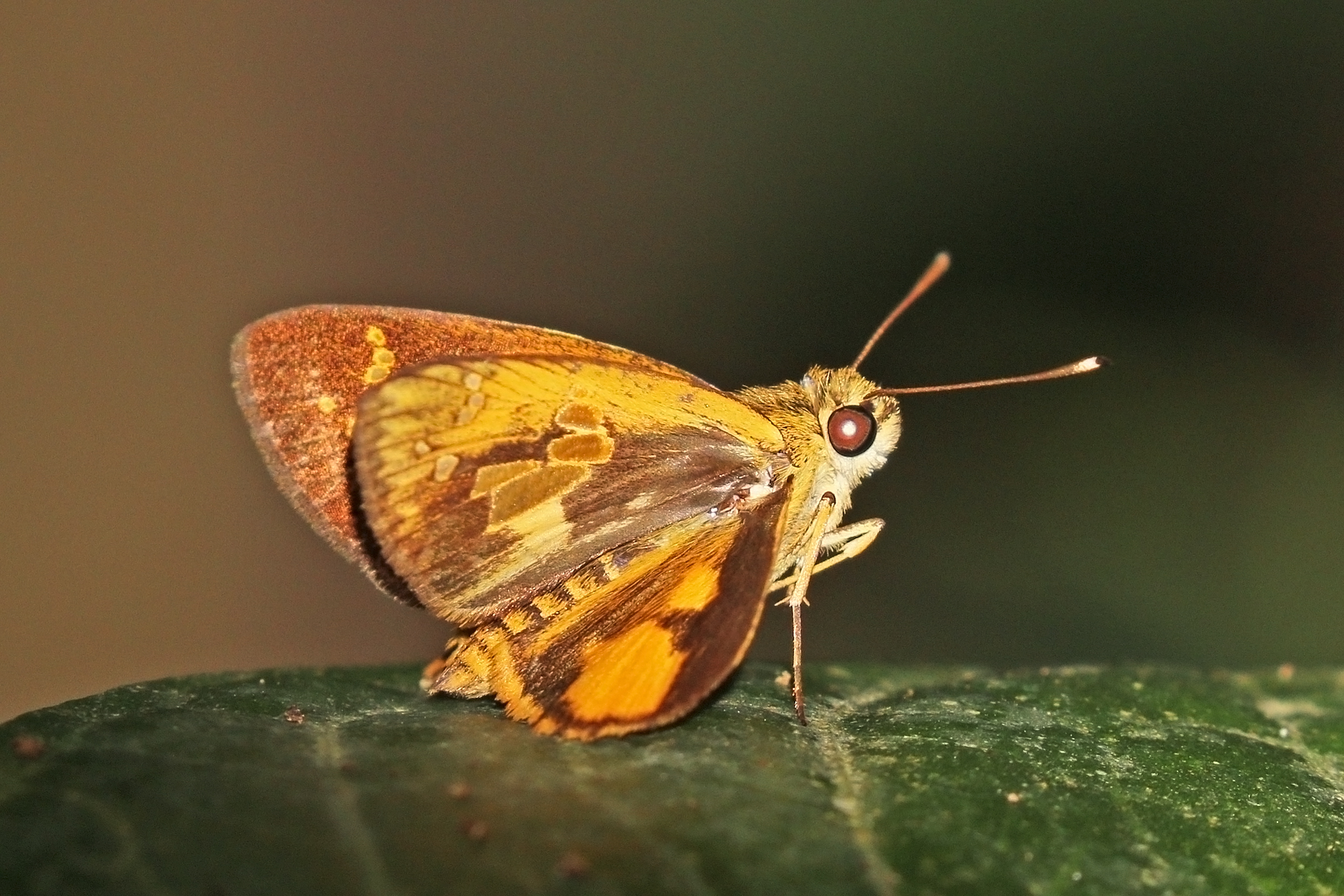
- both males in Kakum National Park, Ghana

Scientific classification
- Kingdom: Animalia
- Phylum: Arthropoda
- Clade: Pancrustacea
- Class: Insecta
- Order: Lepidoptera
- Family: Hesperiidae
- Genus: Pardaleodes
- Species: P. sator

Binomial name
- Pardaleodes sator (Westwood, 1852)

Synonyms
- Cyclopides sator Westwood, 1852; Pardaleodes pusiella Mabille, 1877

= Pardaleodes sator =

Species of butterfly

Pardaleodes sator, the scarce pathfinder skipper, is a butterfly in the family Hesperiidae. It is found in Sierra Leone, Guinea, Liberia, Ivory Coast, Ghana, Togo, Nigeria, Cameroon, Gabon, the Republic of the Congo, the Central African Republic, Angola, the Democratic Republic of the Congo, Sudan, Uganda, Kenya and Tanzania. The habitat consists of forests.

The larvae feed on Oplismenus hirtellus.

== Subspecies ==
- Pardaleodes sator sator (Sierra Leone, Guinea, Liberia, Ivory Coast, Ghana, Togo, Nigeria, western Cameroon)
- Pardaleodes sator pusiella Mabille, 1877 (Cameroon: except the west, Gabon, Congo, Central African Republic, Angola, Democratic Republic of the Congo, southern Sudan, Uganda, western Kenya, western Tanzania)

Torben Larsen developed a species numbering system for his 2005 publication Butterflies of West Africa. The nominate subspecies is #1313. The 'Larsen' numbers have since been used with permission in A Sharp Eye on Butterflies of Ghana.
