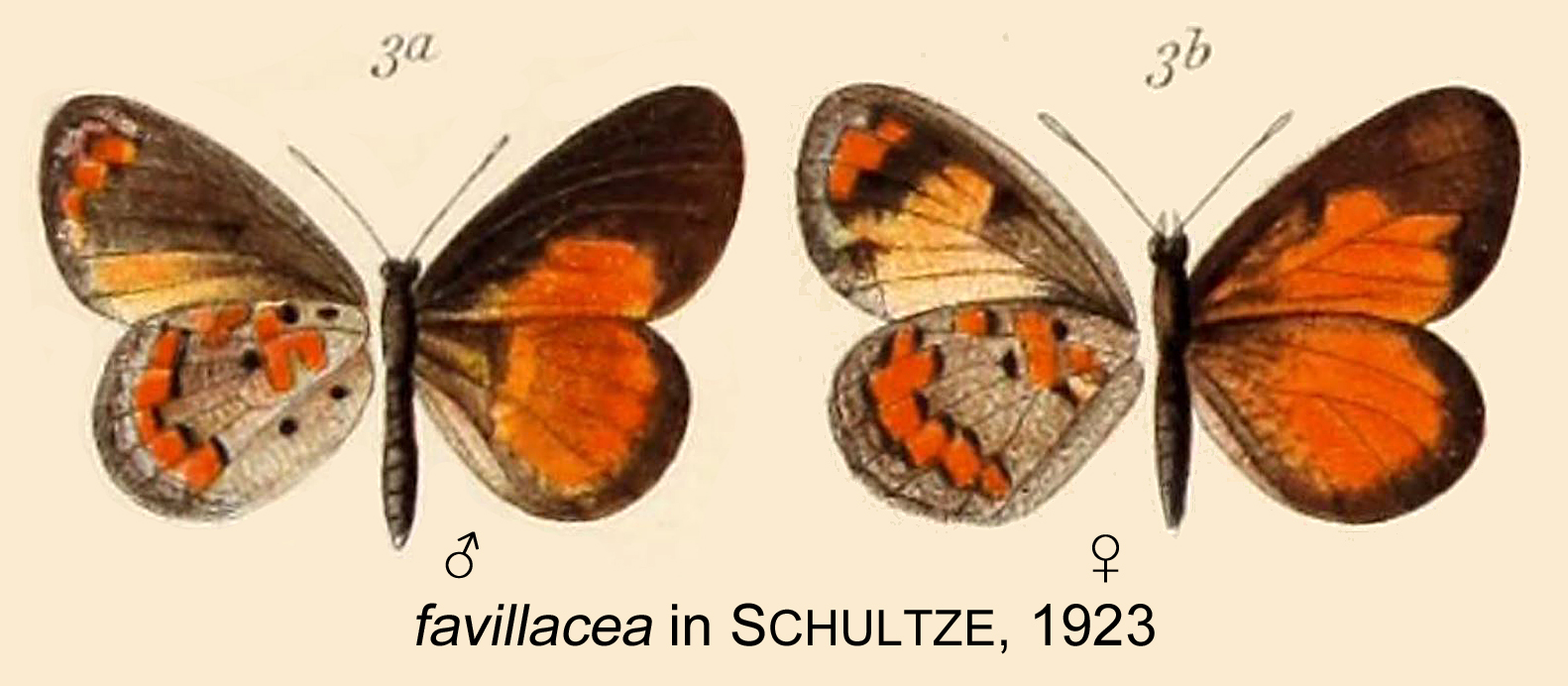

Scientific classification
- Domain: Eukaryota
- Kingdom: Animalia
- Phylum: Arthropoda
- Class: Insecta
- Order: Lepidoptera
- Family: Lycaenidae
- Genus: Mimeresia
- Species: M. favillacea

Binomial name
- Mimeresia favillacea (Grünberg, 1910)

Synonyms
- Pseuderesia favillacea Grünberg, 1910; Pseuderesia favillacea griseata Talbot, 1937

= Mimeresia favillacea =

Species of butterfly

Mimeresia favillacea is a butterfly in the family Lycaenidae. It is found in Cameroon, Equatorial Guinea, Gabon and Uganda. The habitat consists of forests.

== Subspecies ==
- Mimeresia favillacea favillacea (southern Cameroon, Equatorial Guinea, Gabon)
- Mimeresia favillacea griseata (Talbot, 1937) (Uganda, Democratic Republic of the Congo: Sankuru and Lualaba)
