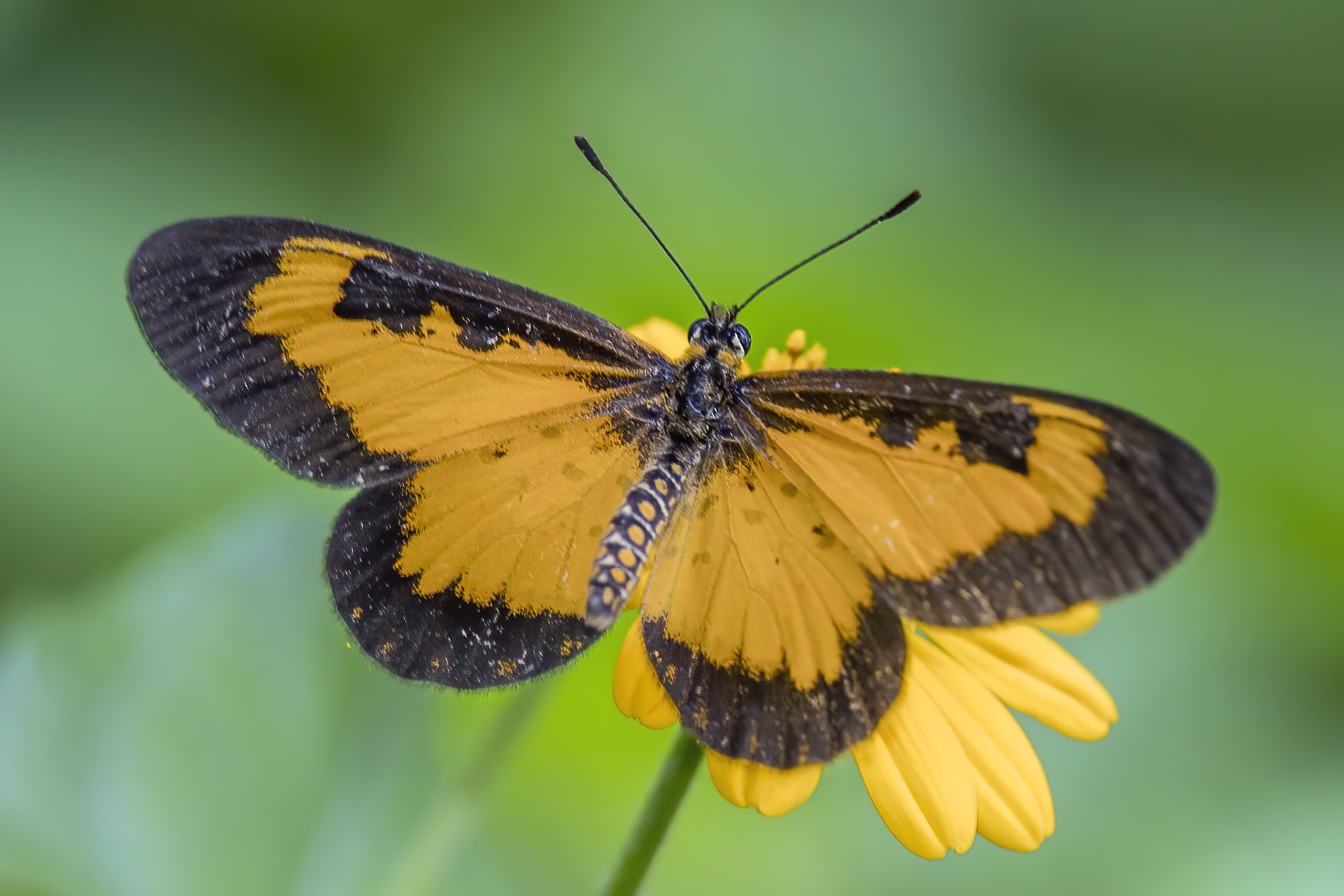

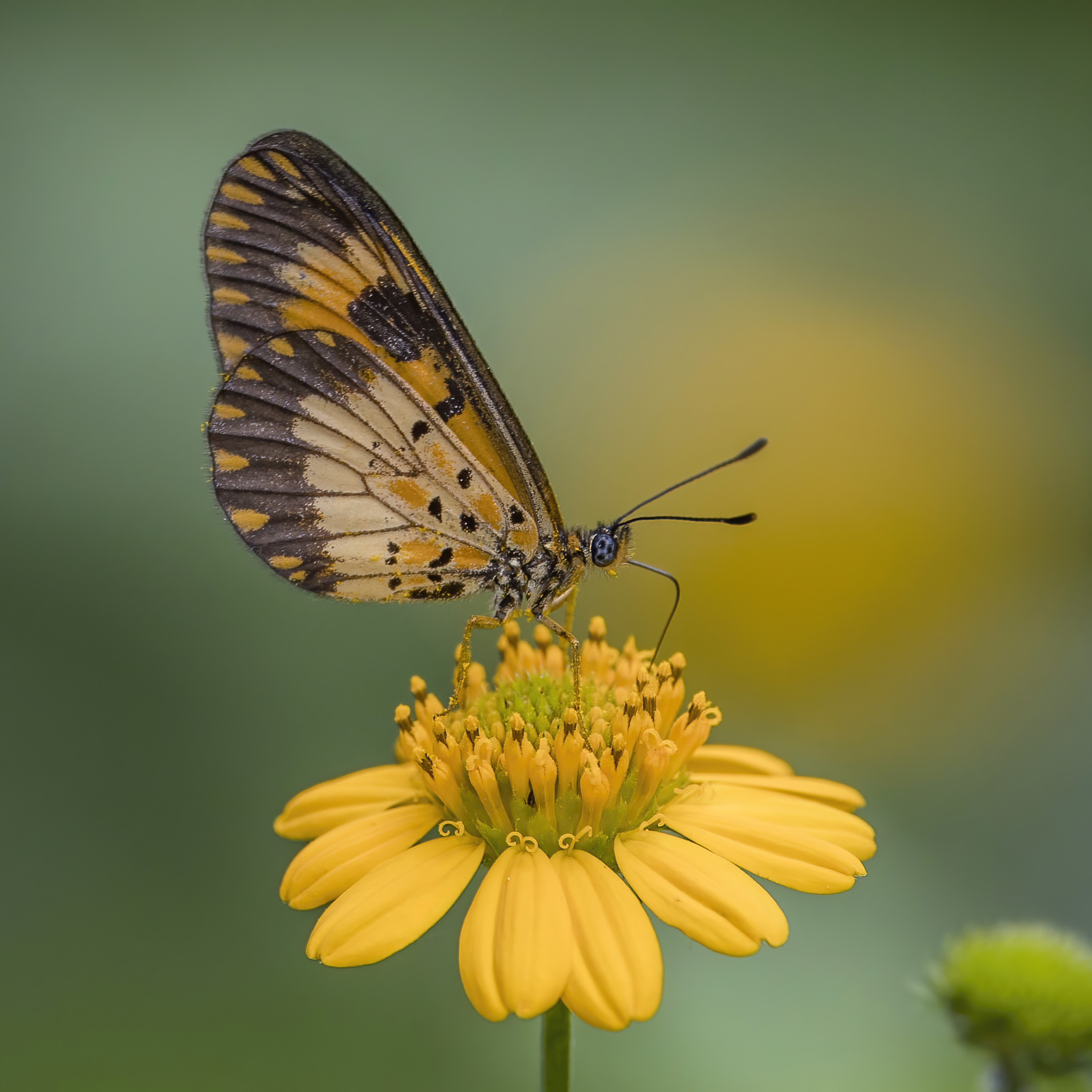
- Both are females

Scientific classification
- Kingdom: Animalia
- Phylum: Arthropoda
- Clade: Pancrustacea
- Class: Insecta
- Order: Lepidoptera
- Family: Nymphalidae
- Genus: Acraea
- Species: A. acerata

Binomial name
- Acraea acerata Hewitson, 1874

Synonyms
- Acraea (Actinote) acerata; Acraea vinidia Hewitson, 1874; Acraea tenella Rogenhofer, 1891; Telchinia tenella; Acraea abbotti Holland, 1892; Acraea brahmsi Suffert, 1904; Acraea vinidia diavina Suffert, 1904; Acraea pullula Grünberg, 1911; Acraea vinidia ab. ruandae Grünberg, 1911; Acraea acerata vinidia ab. burigensis Strand, 1913; Acraea acerata tenella f. alluaudi Le Cerf, 1927; Acraea acerata hoursti Le Cerf, 1927

= Acraea acerata =

Species of butterfly

Acraea acerata, the falls acraea or small yellow-banded acraea, is a butterfly in the family Nymphalidae. It has an extensive range in sub-Saharan Africa.

== Range ==
It is found in Guinea, Sierra Leone, Liberia, Ivory Coast, Ghana, Togo, Benin, Nigeria, Cameroon, the Republic of the Congo, the Democratic Republic of the Congo, Sudan, Rwanda, Kenya, Tanzania, Zambia, Angola, Mozambique, north-western Zimbabwe, northern Botswana and northern Namibia.

== Description ==
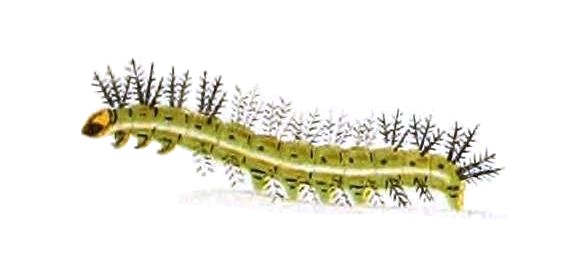

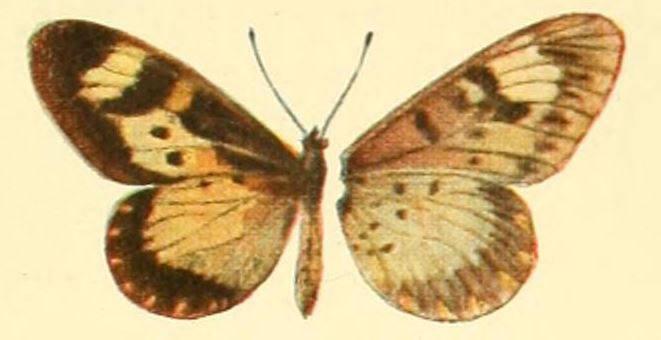
The larva in Eltringham (1912)
and imago in Grünberg (1912)

A. acerata. Forewing black above with light subapical band and light hindmarginal spot, which is placed in 1a to 3, forms a spot in the cell and often encloses a black discal dot in 1b and in 2; hindwing above light nearly to the base, with or without black dots and with black, usually unspotted marginal band about 2 mm. in breadth. Hindwing beneath with reddish streaks in the basal part and with triangular, black-edged, yellow marginal spots in the lighter or darker marginal band.

- acerata Hew. (56 a). Subapical band of the forewing in cellule 3 joined to the hindmarginal spot; light parts of the upper surface yellow-red. Ashanti to Angola and Uganda.
- f. vinidia Hew. (56 a). Subapical band of the forewing not reaching the hindmarginal spot; light markings of the upper surface brown-yellow to red-yellow. Commoner than the type form.
- ab. brahmsi Suff. only differs in having the light markings of the upper surface dark brick-red and the spot in the cell of the forewing absent or small. Nigeria and Cameroons.
- ab. diavina Suff. has on the forewing a small subapical spot, which only consists of three small spots in cellules 4 to 6, and large discal dots in cellules 1b and 2. Cameroons.
- tenella Rog. is the East African race and is distinguished by the much lighter (white-yellow to whitish) colour of the light markings of the upper surface; the subapical band of the forewing is placed quite free. Nyassaland to Abyssinia.
- ab. ruandae Grünb. only differs from tenella in the large black discal dots in cellules 1b and 2 of the forewing. Ruanda.

A. pullula Grünb. entirely lacks the light subapical band of the forewing, but otherwise nearly agrees with tenella and may also be only an extreme form of acerata. Ruanda.

== Biology ==
The habitat consists of disturbed areas in the forest zone, usually near water or in riverine bush.

Both sexes show colour and pattern variation.

The larvae feed on Merremia hederaca, Lepistemon owariense, Solanum, Passiflora, Vernonia, Ipomoea (including Ipomoea whytei, Ipomoea repens and Ipomoea batatas) and possibly Zea species.

Torben Larsen developed a species numbering system for his 2005 publication Butterflies of West Africa. This species is #1160. The 'Larsen' numbers have since been used with permission in A Sharp Eye on Butterflies of Ghana.

== Taxonomy ==
Acraea acerata is a member of the Acraea bonasia species group see Acraea. Classification of Acraea by Henning, Henning & Williams, Pierre. J. & Bernaud

- Hyalites (group bonasia) Henning, 1993
- Acraea (Actinote) (subgroup acerata) Pierre & Bernaud, 2013
- Telchinia (Telchinia) Henning & Williams, 2010
- Acraea (Actonote) groupe serena subgroup acerata Pierre & Bernaud, 2014
