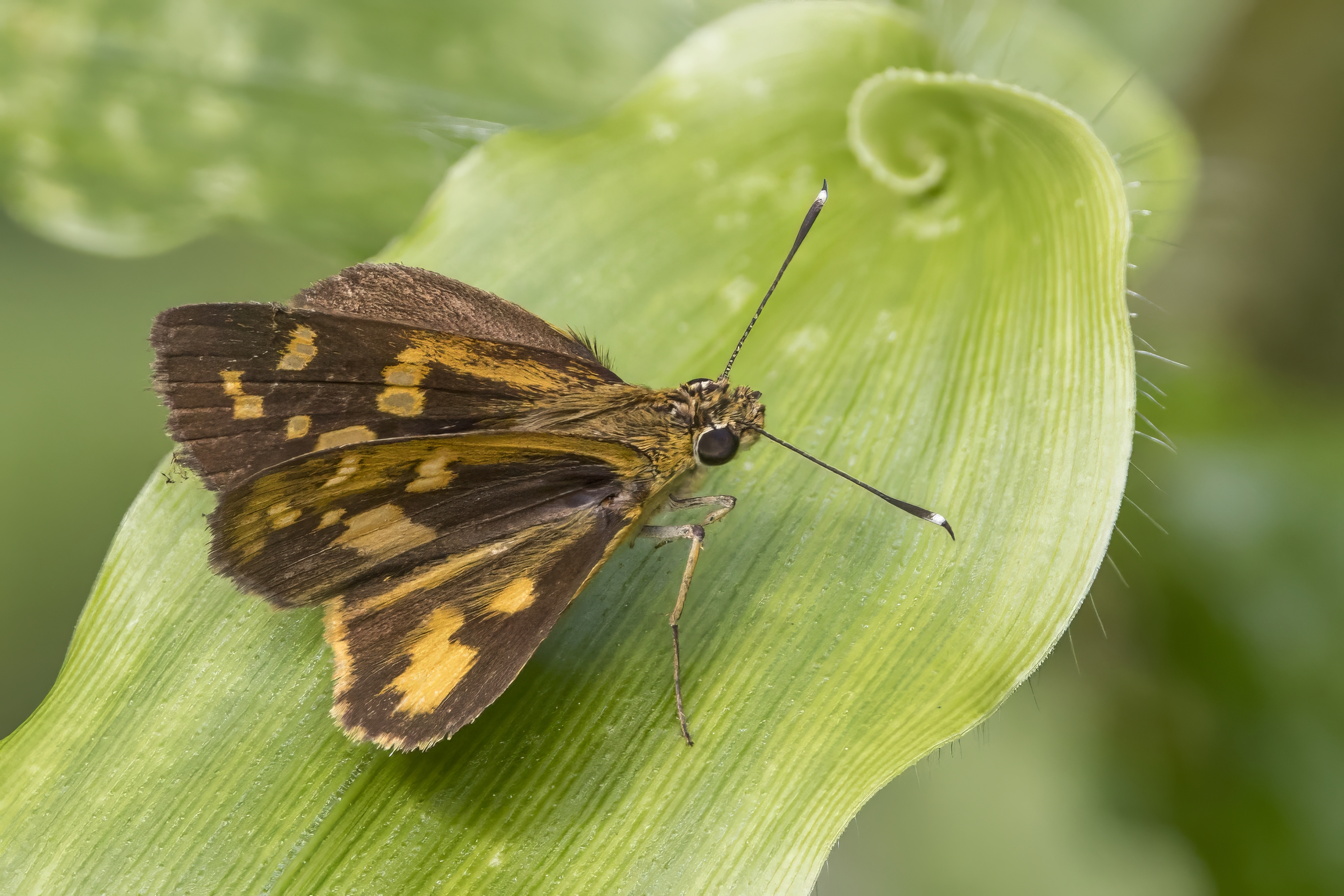
- female, Ashanti Region, Ghana
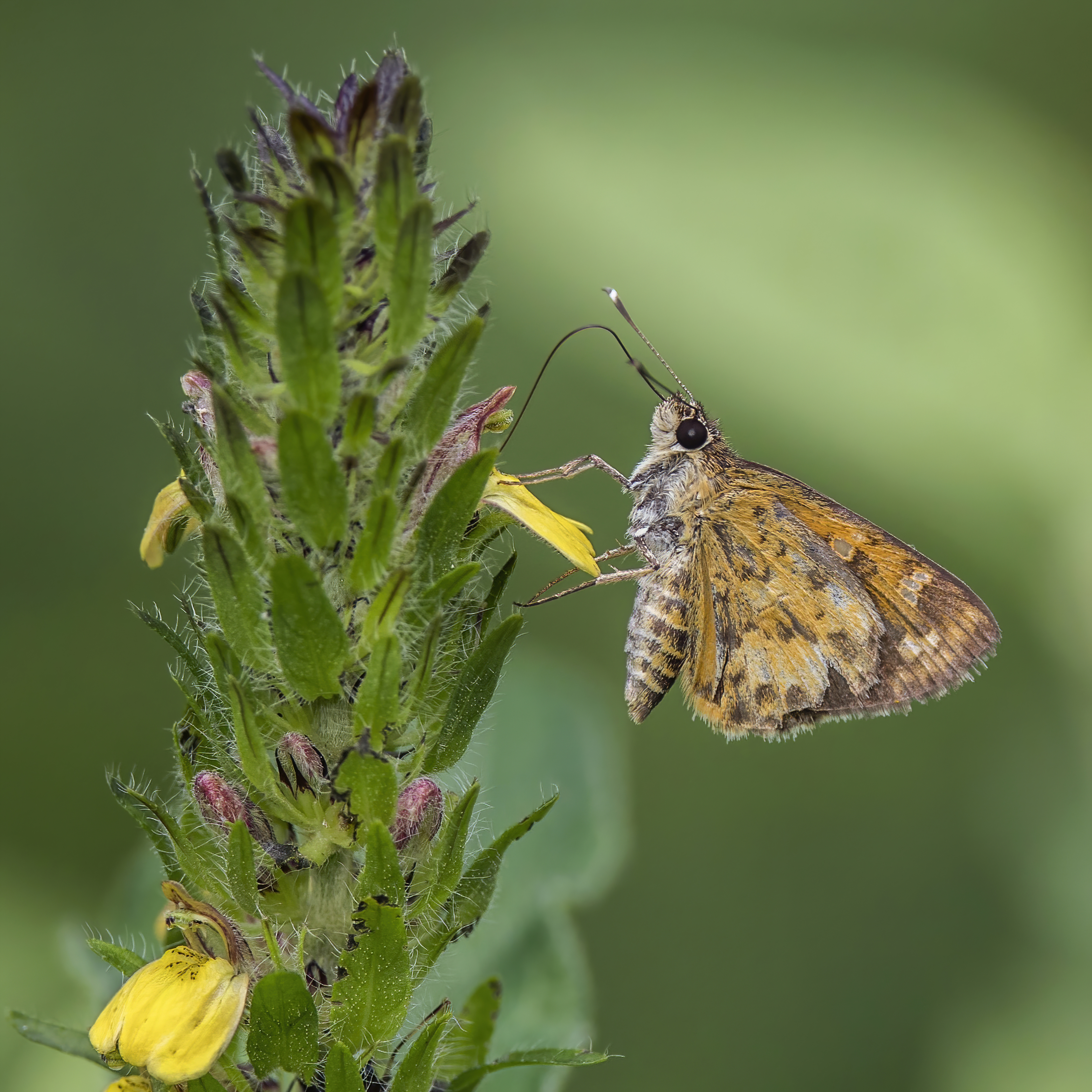
- Aburi Botanical Gardens, Ghana

Scientific classification
- Kingdom: Animalia
- Phylum: Arthropoda
- Clade: Pancrustacea
- Class: Insecta
- Order: Lepidoptera
- Family: Hesperiidae
- Genus: Pardaleodes
- Species: P. edipus

Binomial name
- Pardaleodes edipus (Stoll, 1781)

Synonyms
- Papilio edipus Stoll, 1781

= Pardaleodes edipus =

Species of butterfly

Pardaleodes edipus, the common pathfinder skipper, is a butterfly in the family Hesperiidae. It is found in Senegal, Guinea, Sierra Leone, Liberia, Ivory Coast, Ghana, Togo, Benin, Nigeria, Cameroon, Bioko, Gabon, the Republic of the Congo, the Central African Republic and the Democratic Republic of the Congo. The habitat consists of disturbed areas in forests.

Torben Larsen developed a species numbering system for his 2005 publication Butterflies of West Africa. This species is #1312. The 'Larsen' numbers have since been used with permission in A Sharp Eye on Butterflies of Ghana.
