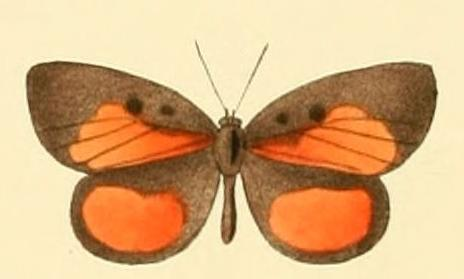

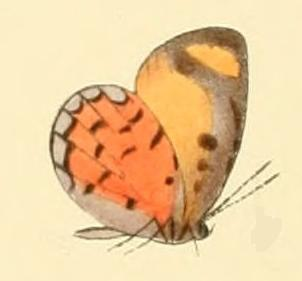

Scientific classification
- Kingdom: Animalia
- Phylum: Arthropoda
- Clade: Pancrustacea
- Class: Insecta
- Order: Lepidoptera
- Family: Lycaenidae
- Genus: Mimeresia
- Species: M. libentina

Binomial name
- Mimeresia libentina (Hewitson, 1866)

Synonyms
- Liptena libentina Hewitson, 1866; Liptena libentina var. zerita Plötz, 1880; Liptena rubrica Druce, 1888; Pseuderesia zoraida Grose-Smith and Kirby, 1890; Pseuderesia libentina var. isabellae Schultze, 1917

= Mimeresia libentina =

Species of butterfly

Mimeresia libentina, the common harlequin, is a butterfly in the family Lycaenidae. It is found in Sierra Leone, Liberia, Ivory Coast, Ghana, Togo, Nigeria, Cameroon, Equatorial Guinea and Gabon. Its natural habitat is forests.

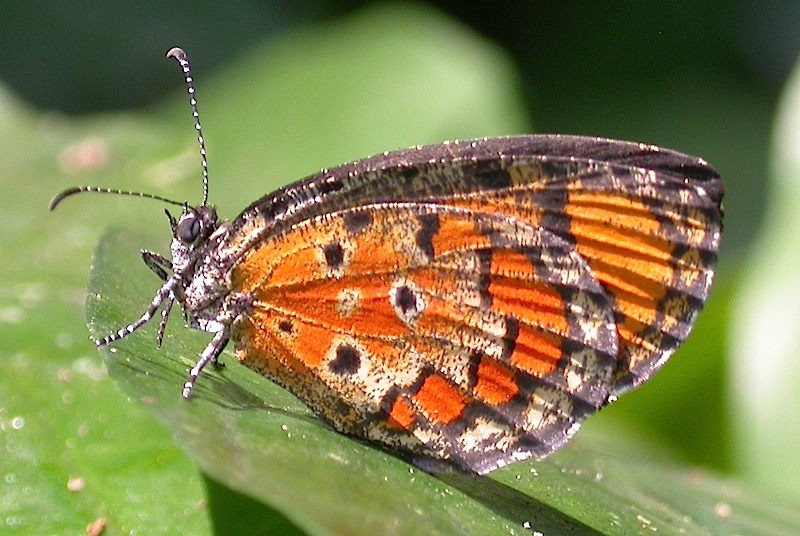

Adults feed on nectar from extrafloral nectaries.

== Subspecies ==
- Mimeresia libentina libentina (Sierra Leone, Liberia, Ivory Coast, Ghana, Togo, southern Nigeria)
- Mimeresia libentina isabellae (Schultze, 1917) (Ghana, Nigeria, Cameroon, Equatorial Guinea: Bioko and Rio Muni, Gabon)

Torben Larsen developed a species numbering system for his 2005 publication Butterflies of West Africa. The nominate subspecies is #184. The 'Larsen' numbers have since been used with permission in A Sharp Eye on Butterflies of Ghana.
