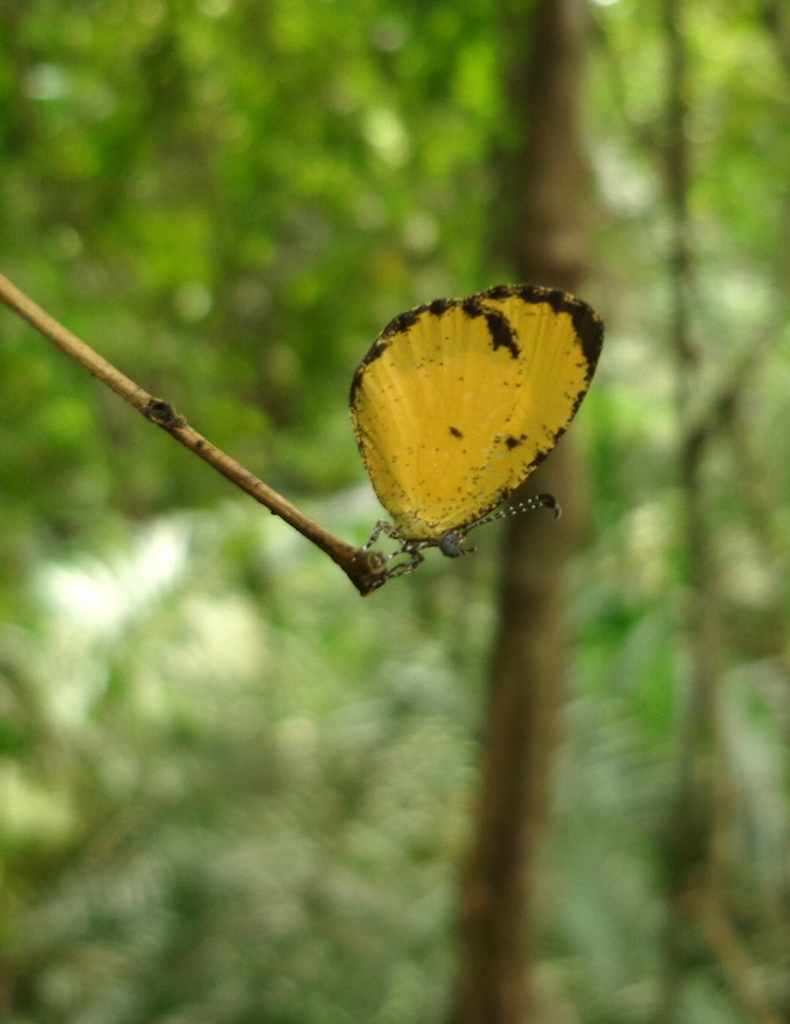

Scientific classification
- Kingdom: Animalia
- Phylum: Arthropoda
- Clade: Pancrustacea
- Class: Insecta
- Order: Lepidoptera
- Family: Lycaenidae
- Genus: Citrinophila
- Species: C. similis

Binomial name
- Citrinophila similis (Kirby, 1887)

Synonyms
- Teriomima similis Kirby, 1887

= Citrinophila similis =

Species of butterfly

Citrinophila similis, the similar yellow, is a butterfly in the family Lycaenidae. It is found in Guinea, Sierra Leone, Ivory Coast, Ghana, southern Nigeria, and Cameroon.Its habitat consists of forests.

Torben Larsen developed a species numbering system for his 2005 publication Butterflies of West Africa. This species is #200. The 'Larsen' numbers have since been used with permission in A Sharp Eye on Butterflies of Ghana.
