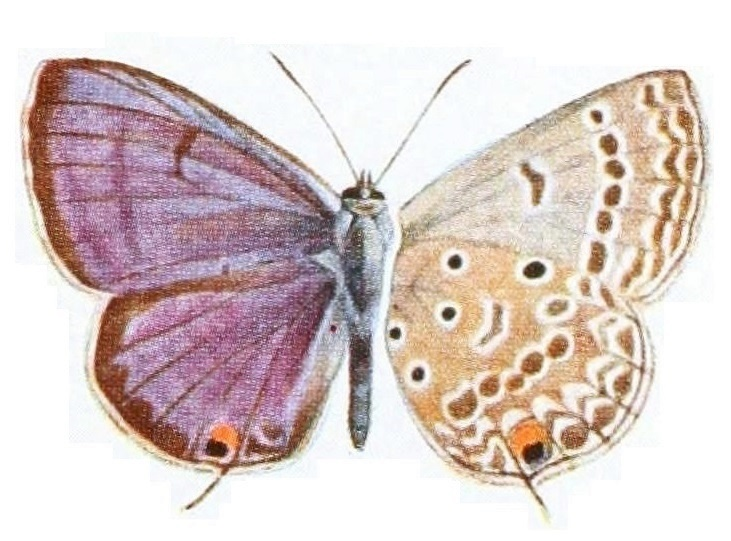

Scientific classification
- Kingdom: Animalia
- Phylum: Arthropoda
- Clade: Pancrustacea
- Class: Insecta
- Order: Lepidoptera
- Family: Lycaenidae
- Genus: Lepidochrysops
- Species: L. quassi

Binomial name
- Lepidochrysops quassi (Karsch, 1895)

Synonyms
- Polyommatus quassi Karsch, 1895; Neochrysops quassi; Catochrysops phasma Butler, 1901; Cupido butha Strand, 1911; Lepidochrysops butha

= Lepidochrysops quassi =

Tailed blue giant Cupid

Species of butterfly

Lepidochrysops quassi, the tailed blue giant Cupid, is a butterfly in the family Lycaenidae. It is found in Ivory Coast, Ghana, Togo, Nigeria and Cameroon. Its habitat consists of open areas in the forest zone.

Adults have been recorded on wing in August and September and from June to November.

The larvae feed on Solenostemon ocymoides and probably also on Ocimum species. They are associated with the ant species Camponotus maculatus.

== Subspecies ==
- Lepidochrysops quassi quassi – Ivory Coast, Ghana, Togo, southern Nigeria
- Lepidochrysops quassi bernaudi Libert & Collins, 2001 – Cameroon

Torben Larsen developed a species numbering system for his 2005 publication Butterflies of West Africa. The nominate subspecies is #615. The 'Larsen' numbers have since been used with permission in A Sharp Eye on Butterflies of Ghana.
