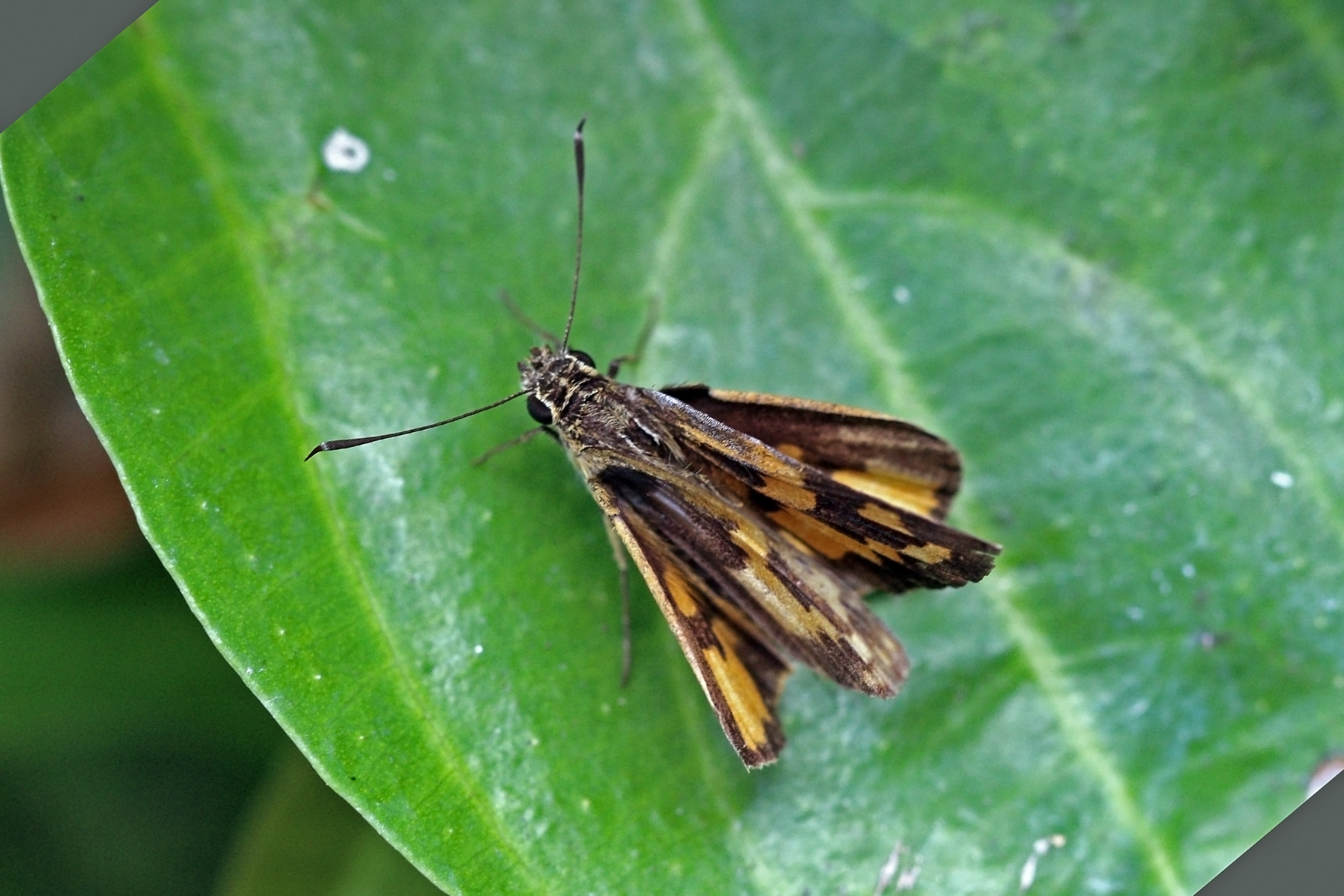
- P. i. incerta, Uganda

Scientific classification
- Kingdom: Animalia
- Phylum: Arthropoda
- Clade: Pancrustacea
- Class: Insecta
- Order: Lepidoptera
- Family: Hesperiidae
- Genus: Pardaleodes
- Species: P. incerta

Binomial name
- Pardaleodes incerta (Snellen, 1872)

Synonyms
- Pamphila incerta Snellen, 1872; Hesperia murcia Plötz, 1883; Pardaleodes oedipus var. diluta Robbe, 1892

= Pardaleodes incerta =

Species of butterfly

Pardaleodes incerta, the savanna pathfinder skipper, is a butterfly in the family Hesperiidae. It is found in Senegal, Guinea-Bissau, Guinea, Burkina Faso, Sierra Leone, Ivory Coast, Ghana, Togo, Nigeria, Cameroon, Gabon, the Republic of the Congo, Angola, the Democratic Republic of the Congo, Sudan, Uganda, Kenya, Tanzania and Zambia. The habitat consists of the transition zone between forests and savanna and riverine forests.

Adults of both sexes are attracted to flowers.

The larvae feed on Imperata cylindrica.

== Subspecies ==
- Pardaleodes incerta incerta (Angola, Democratic Republic of the Congo, southern Sudan, Uganda, Kenya, Tanzania, north-western and north-eastern Zambia)
- Pardaleodes incerta murcia (Plötz, 1883) (Senegal, Guinea-Bissau, Guinea, Burkina Faso, Sierra Leone, Ivory Coast, Ghana, Togo, Nigeria, Cameroon, Gabon, Congo)

Torben Larsen developed a species numbering system for his 2005 publication Butterflies of West Africa. The subspecies murcia is #1311. The 'Larsen' numbers have since been used with permission in A Sharp Eye on Butterflies of Ghana.
