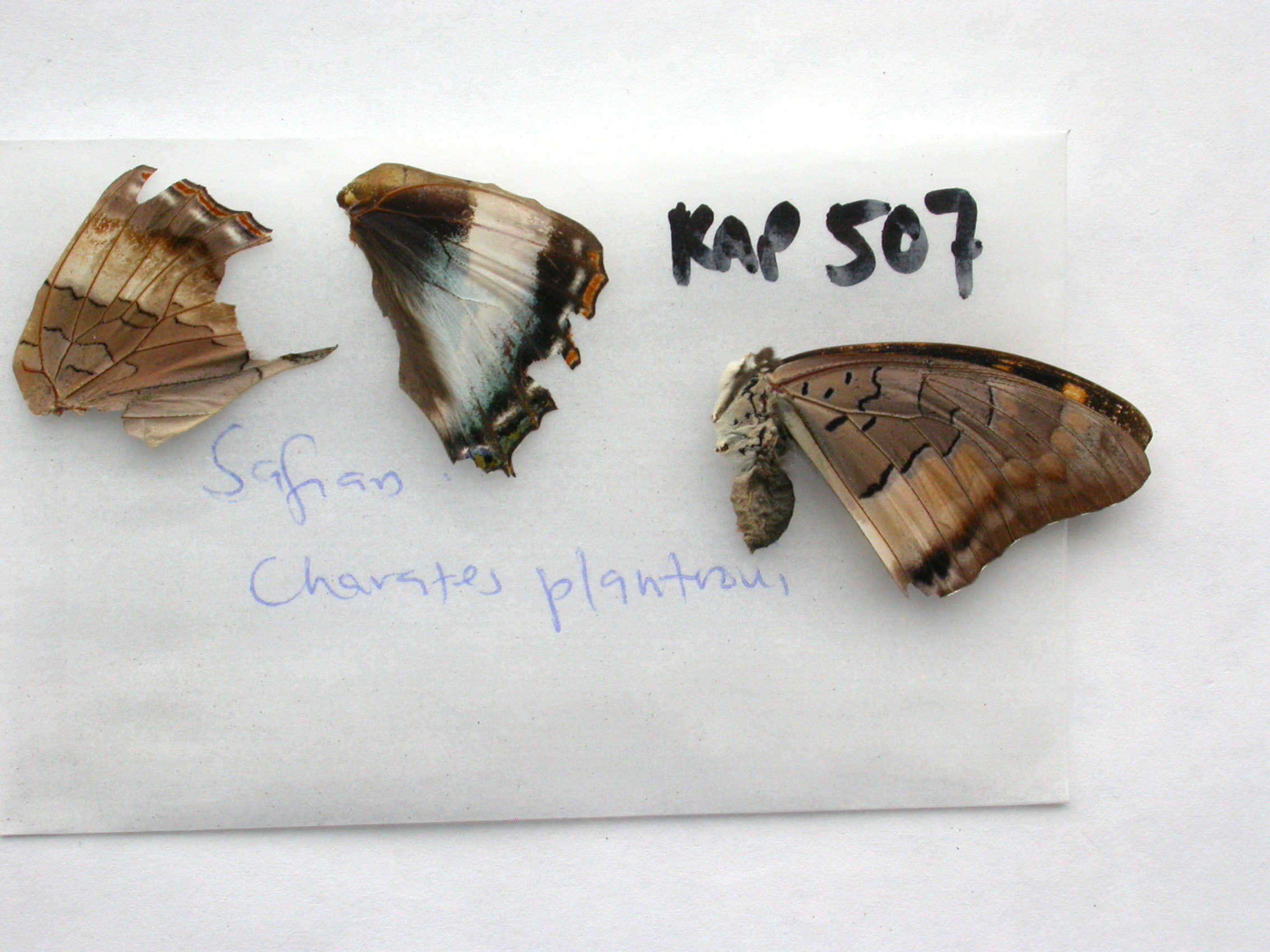

Scientific classification
- Kingdom: Animalia
- Phylum: Arthropoda
- Class: Insecta
- Order: Lepidoptera
- Family: Nymphalidae
- Subfamily: Charaxinae
- Tribe: Charaxini
- Genus: Charaxes
- Species: C. plantroui

Binomial name
- Charaxes plantroui Minig, 1975

Synonyms
- Charaxes plantroui f. simonae Minig, 1975

= Charaxes plantroui =

Pink-washed demon charaxes

Species of butterfly

Charaxes plantroui, the pink-washed demon charaxes, is a butterfly in the family Nymphalidae. It is found in eastern Guinea, Sierra Leone, northern and central Ivory Coast, Ghana and Nigeria. The habitat consists of drier forests and dense Guinea savanna. It is locally common in its habitat.

The larvae feed on Albizia zygia, Albizia adianthifolia, Afzelia africana, Griffonia simplicifolia, Andira inermis and Dalbergia saxatilis.

== Distribution and habitat ==
Charaxes plantroui is found in several West African countries. Its preferred habitat consists of tropical and subtropical moist broadleaf forests, particularly areas with dense canopy cover.
