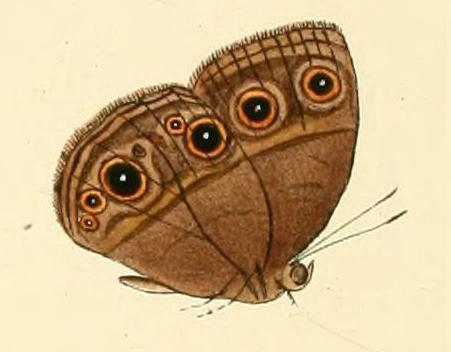

Scientific classification
- Kingdom: Animalia
- Phylum: Arthropoda
- Clade: Pancrustacea
- Class: Insecta
- Order: Lepidoptera
- Family: Nymphalidae
- Genus: Bicyclus
- Species: B. milyas

Binomial name
- Bicyclus milyas (Hewitson, 1864)

Synonyms
- Mycalesis milyas Hewitson, 1864; Mycalesis desolata Butler, 1876; Mycalesis leptoglena Karsch, 1893

= Bicyclus milyas =

Species of butterfly

Bicyclus milyas, the lesser rock bush brown, is a butterfly in the family Nymphalidae. It is found in Senegal, the Gambia, Guinea-Bissau, Mali, Guinea, Burkina Faso, northern Sierra Leone, northern Ivory Coast, northern Ghana, northern Togo, northern Benin, northern Nigeria, the northern part of the Democratic Republic of the Congo, Sudan, northern Uganda, south-western Ethiopia and Kenya. The habitat consists of dry savanna.

The larvae feed on Imperata cylindrica and Pennisetum purpureum.

Torben Larsen developed a species numbering system for his 2005 publication Butterflies of West Africa. This species is #680. The 'Larsen' numbers have since been used with permission in A Sharp Eye on Butterflies of Ghana.
