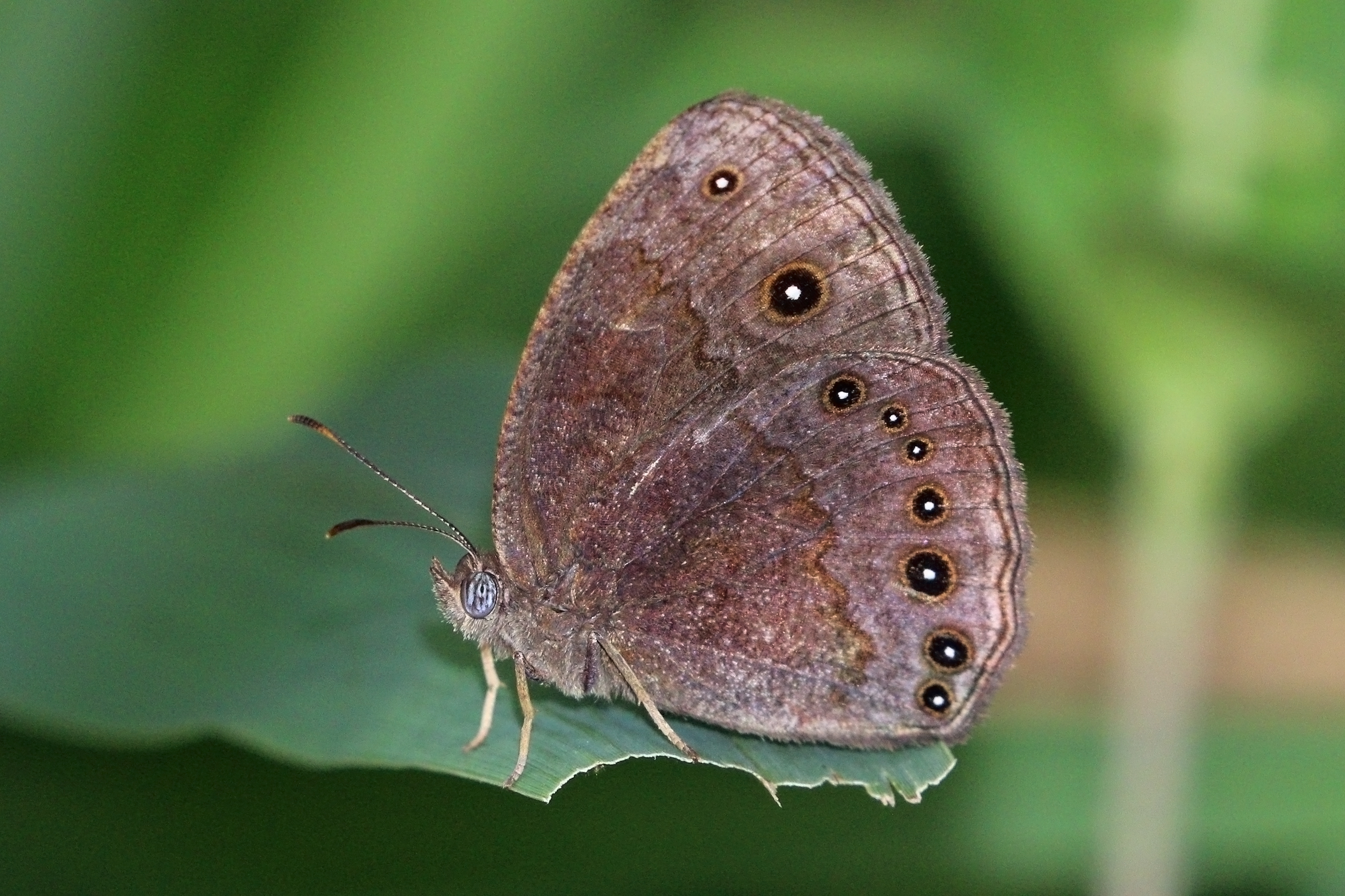
- In Ghana

Scientific classification
- Kingdom: Animalia
- Phylum: Arthropoda
- Clade: Pancrustacea
- Class: Insecta
- Order: Lepidoptera
- Family: Nymphalidae
- Genus: Bicyclus
- Species: B. vulgaris

Binomial name
- Bicyclus vulgaris (Butler, 1868)

Synonyms
- Mycalesis vulgaris Butler, 1868; Mycalesis tolosa Plötz, 1880

= Bicyclus vulgaris =

Vulgar bush brown

Species of butterfly

Bicyclus vulgaris, the vulgar bush brown, is a butterfly in the family Nymphalidae. It is found in Senegal, the Gambia, Mali, Guinea-Bissau, Guinea, Burkina Faso, Sierra Leone, Liberia, Ivory Coast, Ghana, Togo, Benin, Nigeria, Cameroon, the Republic of the Congo, Angola, the Democratic Republic of the Congo, Uganda, Ethiopia, western Kenya, Tanzania and north-western Zambia. The habitat consists of forests (including pre-forest and riparian forest), dense savanna, the edges of farmland, woodland and marshy areas.

The larvae feed on Poaceae species.

Torben Larsen developed a species numbering system for his 2005 publication Butterflies of West Africa. This species is #690. The 'Larsen' numbers have since been used with permission in A Sharp Eye on Butterflies of Ghana.
