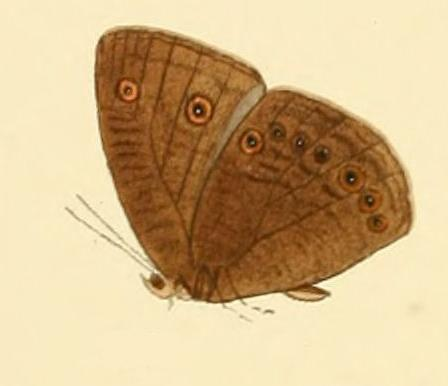

Scientific classification
- Kingdom: Animalia
- Phylum: Arthropoda
- Clade: Pancrustacea
- Class: Insecta
- Order: Lepidoptera
- Family: Nymphalidae
- Genus: Bicyclus
- Species: B. sandace

Binomial name
- Bicyclus sandace (Hewitson, 1877)

Synonyms
- Mycalesis sandace Hewitson, 1877

= Bicyclus sandace =

Dark vulgar bush brown

Species of butterfly

Bicyclus sandace, the dark vulgar bush brown, is a butterfly in the family Nymphalidae. It is found in Senegal, the Gambia, Guinea, Burkina Faso, Sierra Leone, Liberia, Ivory Coast, Ghana, Togo, Benin, Nigeria, Cameroon, Bioko, the Republic of the Congo, the Central African Republic, Angola, the Democratic Republic of the Congo, Uganda, Ethiopia, western Kenya, western Tanzania and Zambia. The habitat consists of lowland and sub-montane forests.

Adults are attracted to fermented fruit.

The larvae feed on Poaceae species.

Torben Larsen developed a species numbering system for his 2005 publication Butterflies of West Africa. This species is #692. The 'Larsen' numbers have since been used with permission in A Sharp Eye on Butterflies of Ghana.
