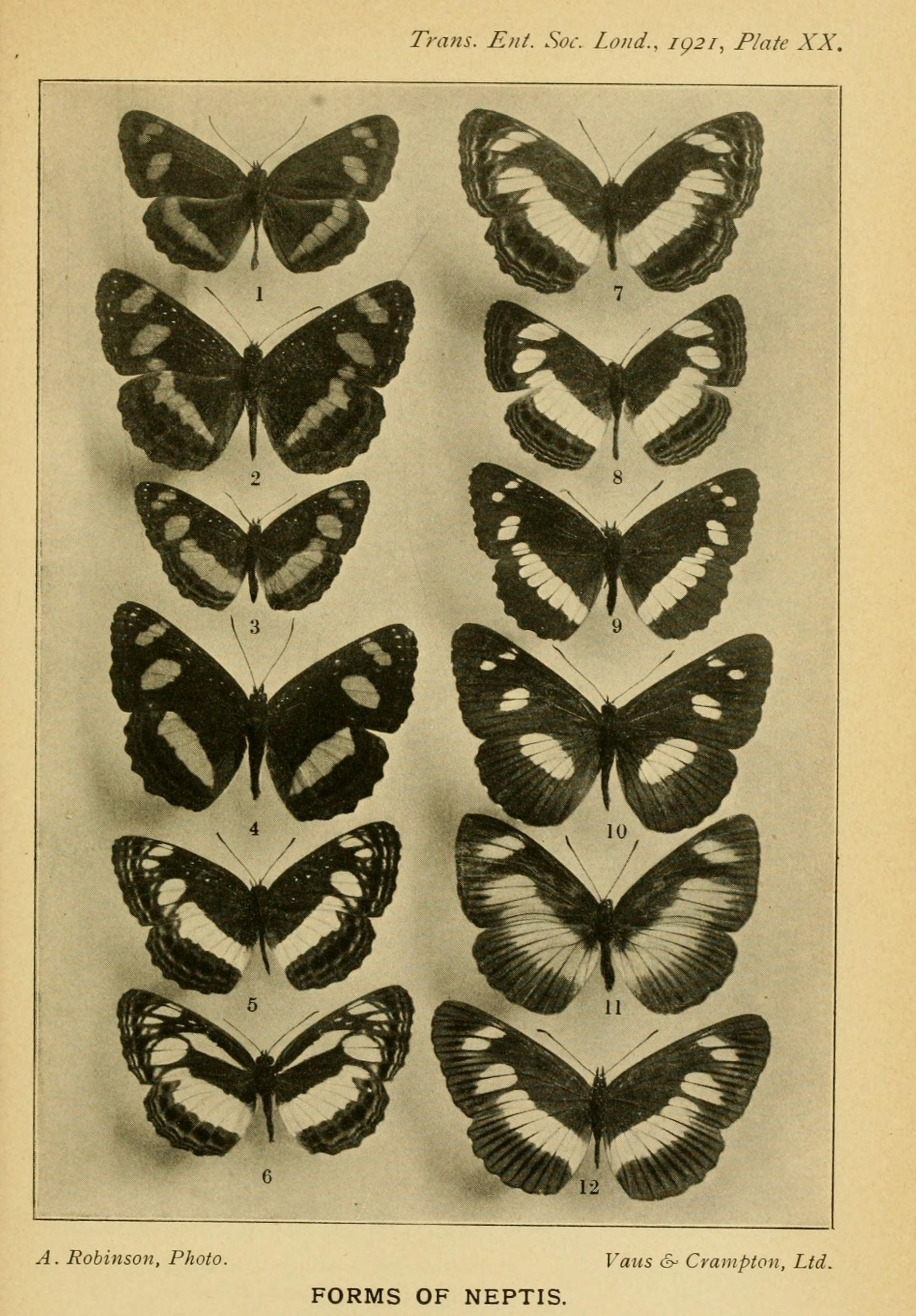
- Figure 9

Scientific classification
- Kingdom: Animalia
- Phylum: Arthropoda
- Clade: Pancrustacea
- Class: Insecta
- Order: Lepidoptera
- Family: Nymphalidae
- Genus: Neptis
- Species: N. incongrua

Binomial name
- Neptis incongrua Butler, 1896

= Neptis incongrua =

Species of butterfly

Neptis incongrua is a butterfly in the family Nymphalidae. It is found in Malawi, Zambia, the Democratic Republic of the Congo, Tanzania, Uganda and south-eastern Kenya. The habitat consists of sub-montane to montane forests.

The larvae feed on Wisteria sinensis and Dombeya species.

== Subspecies ==
- Neptis incongrua incongrua (Malawi, Zambia, southern and eastern Tanzania)
- Neptis incongrua isidoro Kielland, 1985 (north-eastern Tanzania)
- Neptis incongrua nguru Kielland, 1987 (eastern Tanzania)

== Description ==
Interneural folds not dark, but the veins on the underside more or less blackish. The discal band of the hindwing is only 3–4 mm. in breadth and the discal spots of the forewing are small and rounded. The hindmarginal spot of the forewing is small and broadly separated from discal spot 2. N. incongrua Btlr. (48 f). All the markings pure white; the discal band of the hindwing is placed somewhat behind the middle and does not cover the base of cellule 3; wings above nearly black; beneath bright yellow-brown with the markings edged with black; the forewing on both surfaces shortly beyond the apex of the cell with 3 or 4 white dots in cellules 4—6 and 10; fringes white-spotted. Nyassaland and German East Africa. Images BOLD

== Taxonomy ==
It is the nominotypcal member of the Species group incongrua

- Neptis incongrua
- Neptis kikuyuensis
- Neptis aurivillii
- Neptis neavei
- Neptis swynnertoni
- Neptis occidentalis
- Neptis batesi
- Neptis exaleuca
