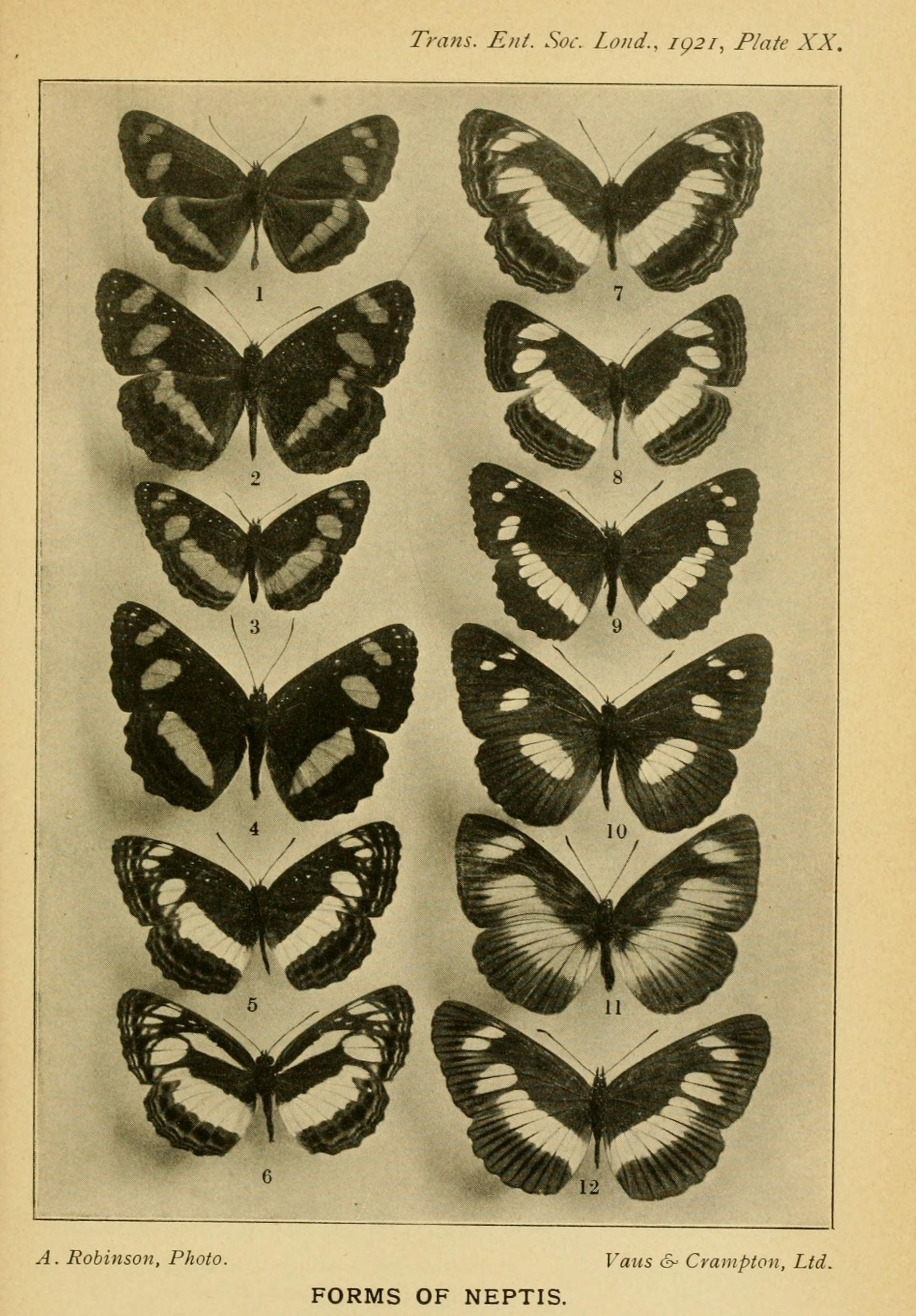
- Figure 10

Scientific classification
- Kingdom: Animalia
- Phylum: Arthropoda
- Class: Insecta
- Order: Lepidoptera
- Family: Nymphalidae
- Genus: Neptis
- Species: N. woodwardi

Binomial name
- Neptis woodwardi Sharpe, 1899

= Neptis woodwardi =

Species of butterfly

Neptis woodwardi, or Woodward's sailer, is a butterfly in the family Nymphalidae. It is found in Uganda and Kenya.

== Description ==
N. woodwardi E. Sharpe differs from incongrua in the absence of the white dots beyond the apex of the cell on the forewing, while the discal spots of the forewing are smaller and may even be entirely absent in cellules 1 a and 1 b and the median band of the hindwing is placed nearer to the base, covers the base of cellule 3 and is ochre-yellowish. Uganda Images BOLD

== Subspecies ==
- Neptis woodwardi woodwardi (Kenya: west of the Rift Valley, eastern Uganda)
- Neptis woodwardi translima Collins & Larsen, 1991 (Kenya: central highlands) Now species

== Taxonomy ==
It is the nominotypical mmmber of the Species group woodwardi

- Neptis woodwardi
- Neptis translima
- Neptis ochracea
- Neptis mildbraedi
