= Neptis eltringhami =

Scientific classification
- Kingdom: Animalia
- Phylum: Arthropoda
- Clade: Pancrustacea
- Class: Insecta
- Order: Lepidoptera
- Family: Nymphalidae
- Genus: Neptis
- Species: N. eltringhami

Binomial name
- Neptis eltringhami Joicey & Talbot, 1926

Species of butterfly

Neptis eltringhami is a butterfly in the family Nymphalidae. It is found on São Tomé Island. The species was named by James John Joicey and George Talbot in 1926 after entomologist Harry Eltringham.
