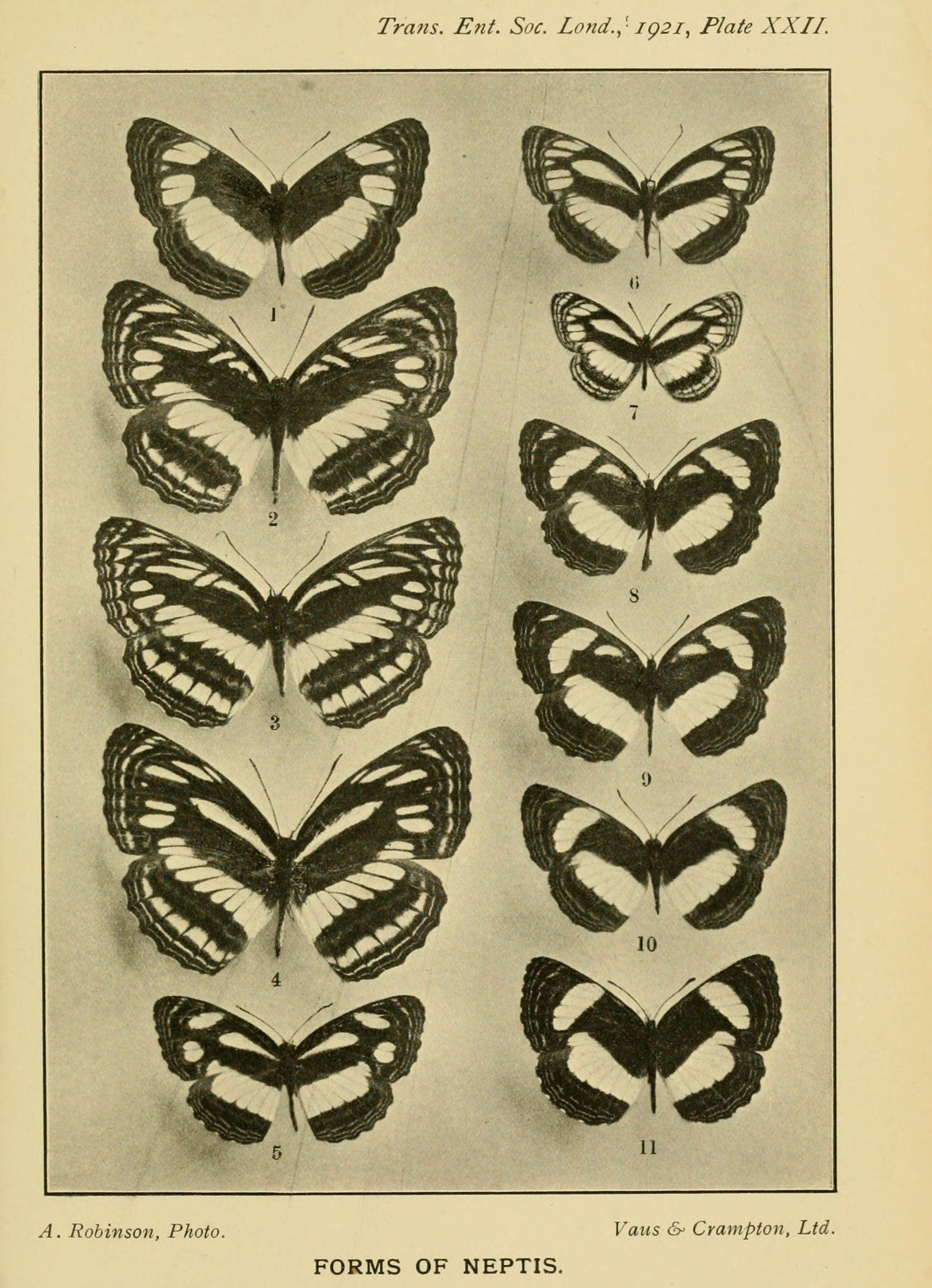
- Male, figure 4

Scientific classification
- Kingdom: Animalia
- Phylum: Arthropoda
- Class: Insecta
- Order: Lepidoptera
- Family: Nymphalidae
- Genus: Neptis
- Species: N. rothschildi

Binomial name
- Neptis rothschildi Eltringham, 1921

= Neptis rothschildi =

Species of butterfly

Neptis rothschildi is a butterfly in the family Nymphalidae. It is found in the Kisangani region of the Democratic Republic of the Congo.
