= Neptis sextilla =

Scientific classification
- Kingdom: Animalia
- Phylum: Arthropoda
- Class: Insecta
- Order: Lepidoptera
- Family: Nymphalidae
- Genus: Neptis
- Species: N. sextilla

Binomial name
- Neptis sextilla Mabille, 1882

Species of butterfly

Neptis sextilla is a butterfly in the family Nymphalidae.

== Taxonomy ==
The type location is Madagascar, but this is possibly a false locality. The type is possibly lost and the description suggests that although it may well have been recorded from Madagascar, it is either an aberration or a hybrid between Neptis kikideli and Neptis saclava. It may also be a re-description of one of the agatha species group species from the African mainland.
