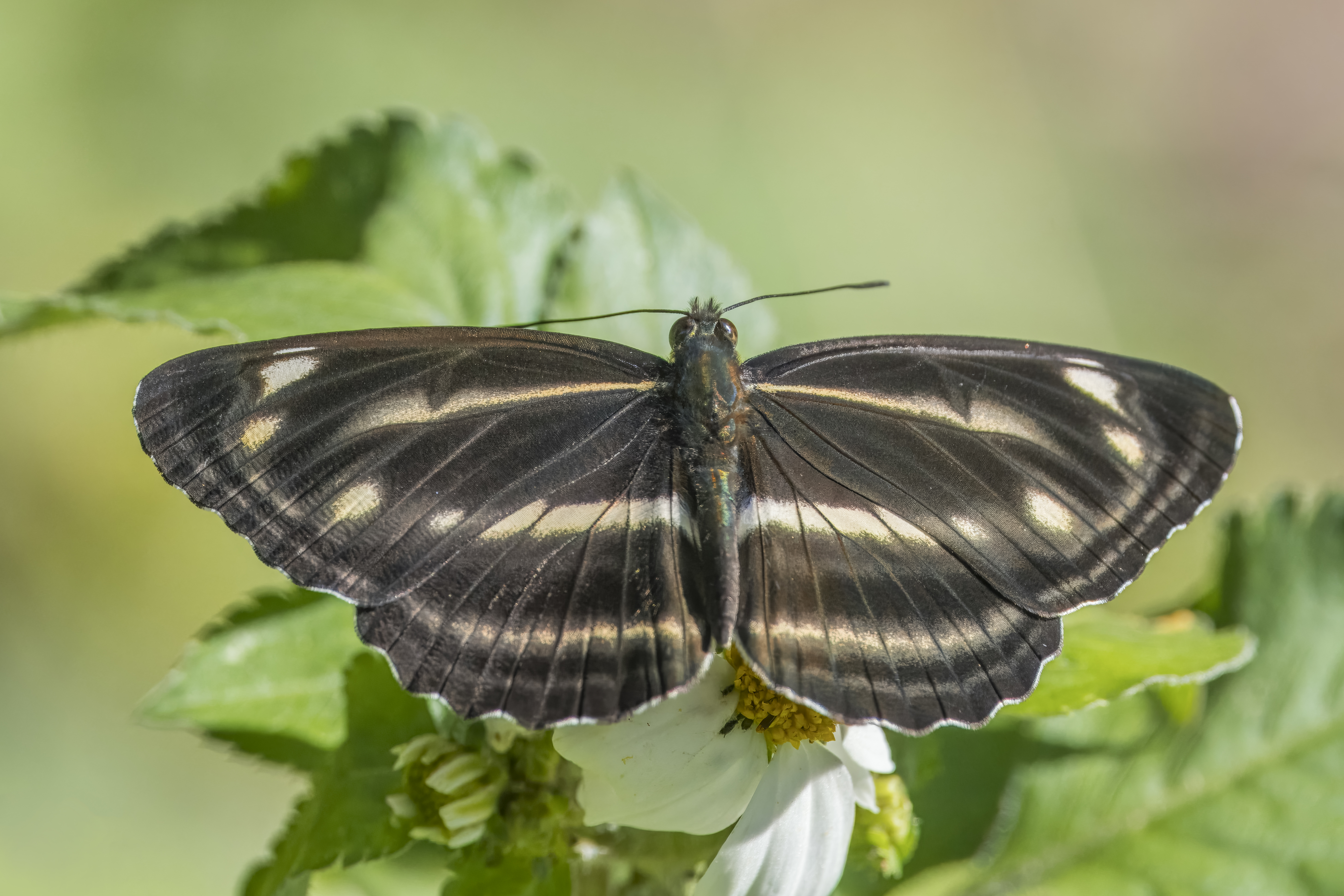

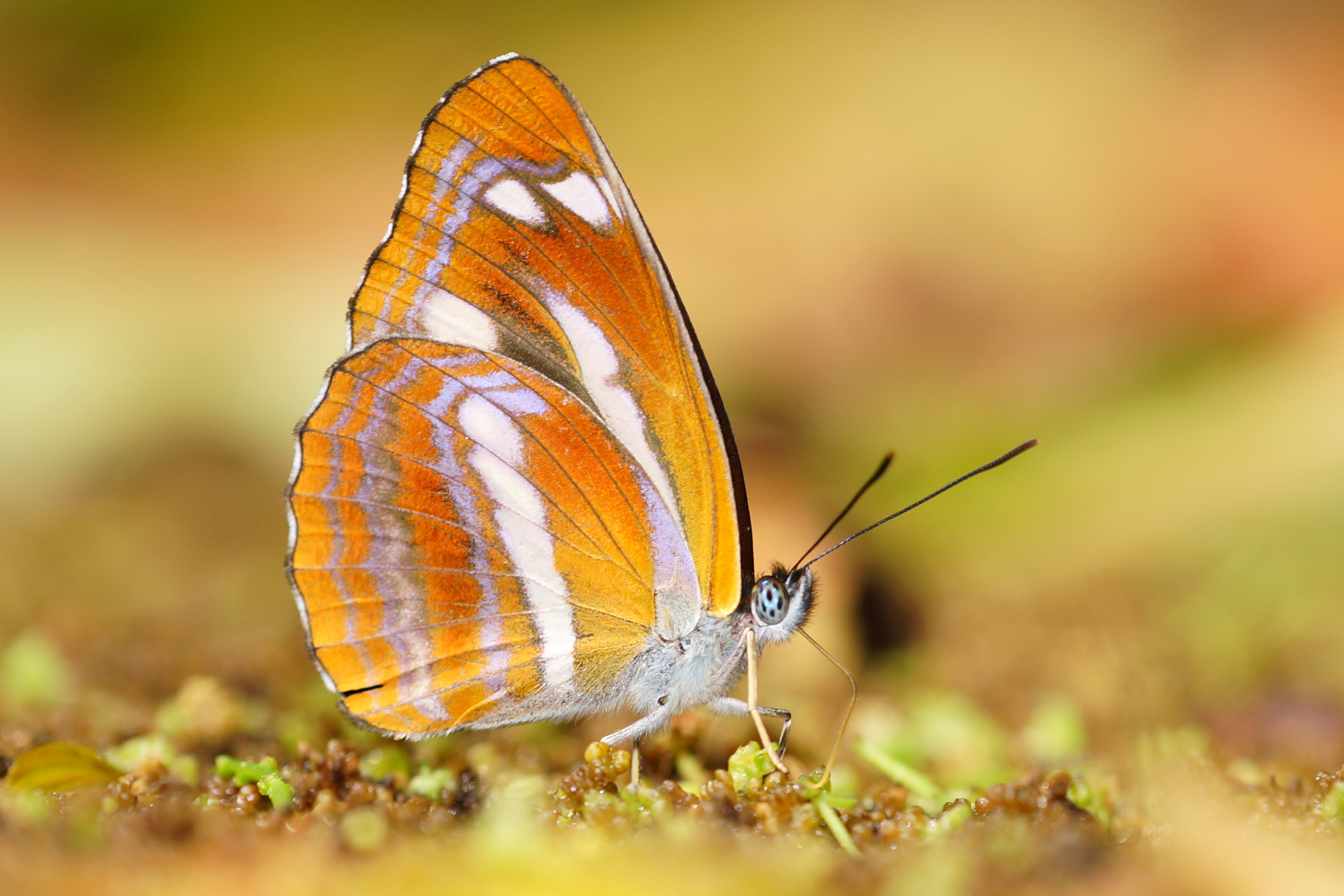
- both N. taiwana, a Taiwan endemic

Scientific classification
- Kingdom: Animalia
- Phylum: Arthropoda
- Class: Insecta
- Order: Lepidoptera
- Family: Nymphalidae
- Subfamily: Limenitidinae
- Tribe: Neptini
- Genus: Neptis; Fabricius, 1807

Species
- 158 species

Synonyms
- Philonoma Billberg, 1820; Paraneptis Moore, 1898; Kalkasia Moore, 1898; Hamadryodes Moore, 1898; Bimbisara Moore, 1898; Bimbisara Moore, [1899]; Stabrobates Moore, 1898; Stabrobates Moore, [1899]; Rasalia Moore, 1898; Rasalia Moore, [1899]; Neptidomima Holland, 1920

= Neptis =

Typical sailers

Genus of brush-footed butterflies

Neptis is a large genus of butterflies of Old World tropics and subtropics. They are commonly called sailer butterflies or sailers, or more precisely typical sailers to distinguish them from the related blue sailer (Pseudoneptis).

== Description ==
The head is rather broad and moderately hairy on the forehead. The eyes are large and prominent. The palpi are short, acute, slender, hairy, and do not rise above the level of the forehead. The antennae are moderately long, terminating in an elongate, gradually-formed club, flattened on its upper surface. The thorax is not robust and it is as broad as the head and slightly hairy posteriorly. The wing characters are: forewings elongate, rather truncate; costa only slightly arched; apex not acute, but well marked; hind margin slightly convex and sinuated; anal angle distinct; inner-margin convex near base, slightly concave about middle. Hindwings large, rounded; costa strongly arched; hind margin moderately dentate; inner margins only slightly convex, not covering posterior portion of the abdomen. Upperside patterning consists of white spots and bars (some species have orange or yellow bars) on a black ground colour. Underside patterns are yellowish to reddish brown, alternating with white bands The legs are rather short and stout. The abdomen is slender, much compressed and rather elongate.

The head of the larva is very large and bifid on its summit. There is a pair of downy, elongate, tubercular processes, projecting laterally, on both the second and third segments—those on the third segment are much longer. There is an upright pyramidal process on the penultimate segment and the body is attenuated posteriorly.

The pupa is strongly curved (thick in central portion). The head is deeply bifid.

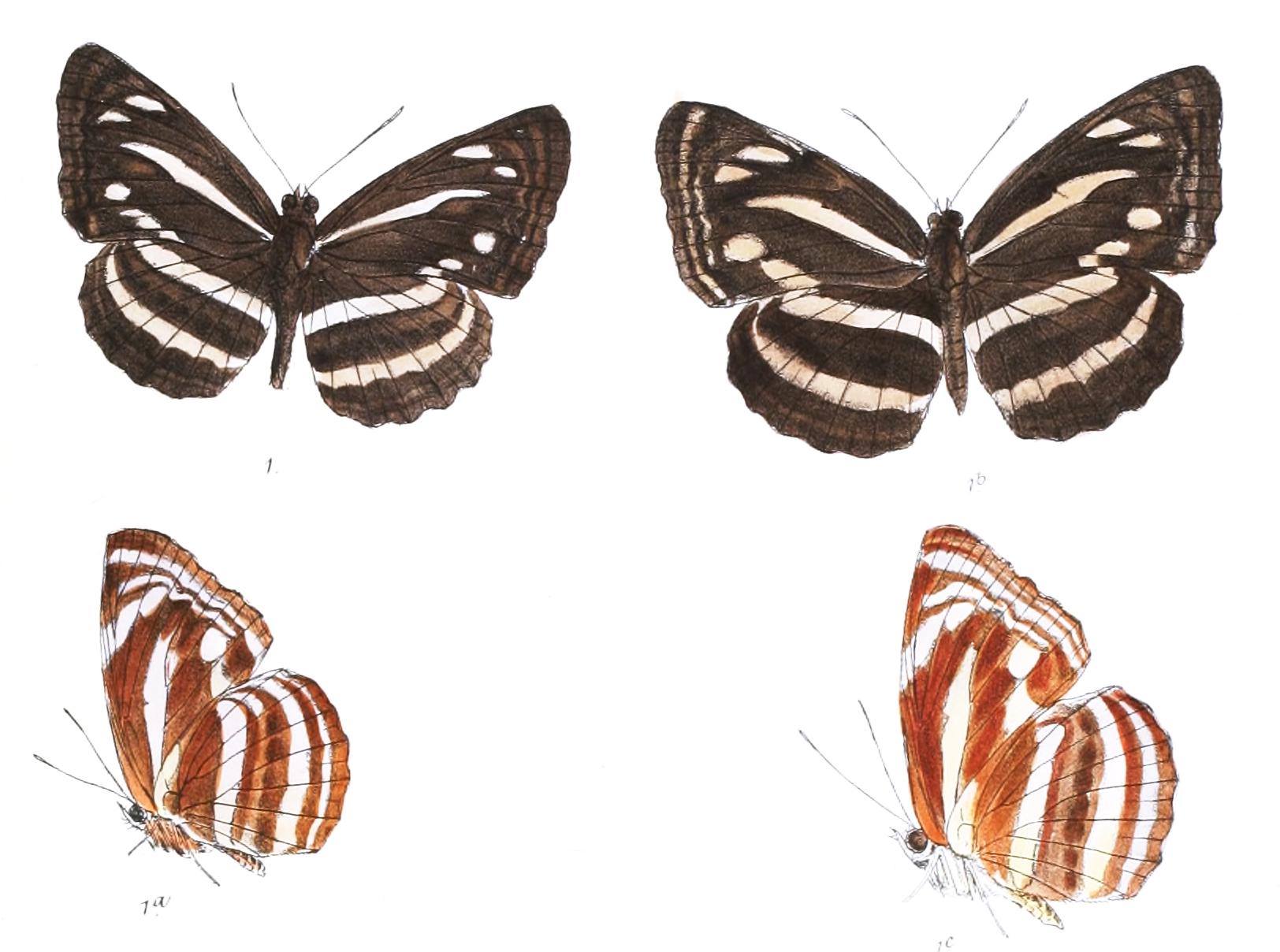
Neptis nashona showing undersides. In Neptis both sexes have similar wing markings but females are larger.

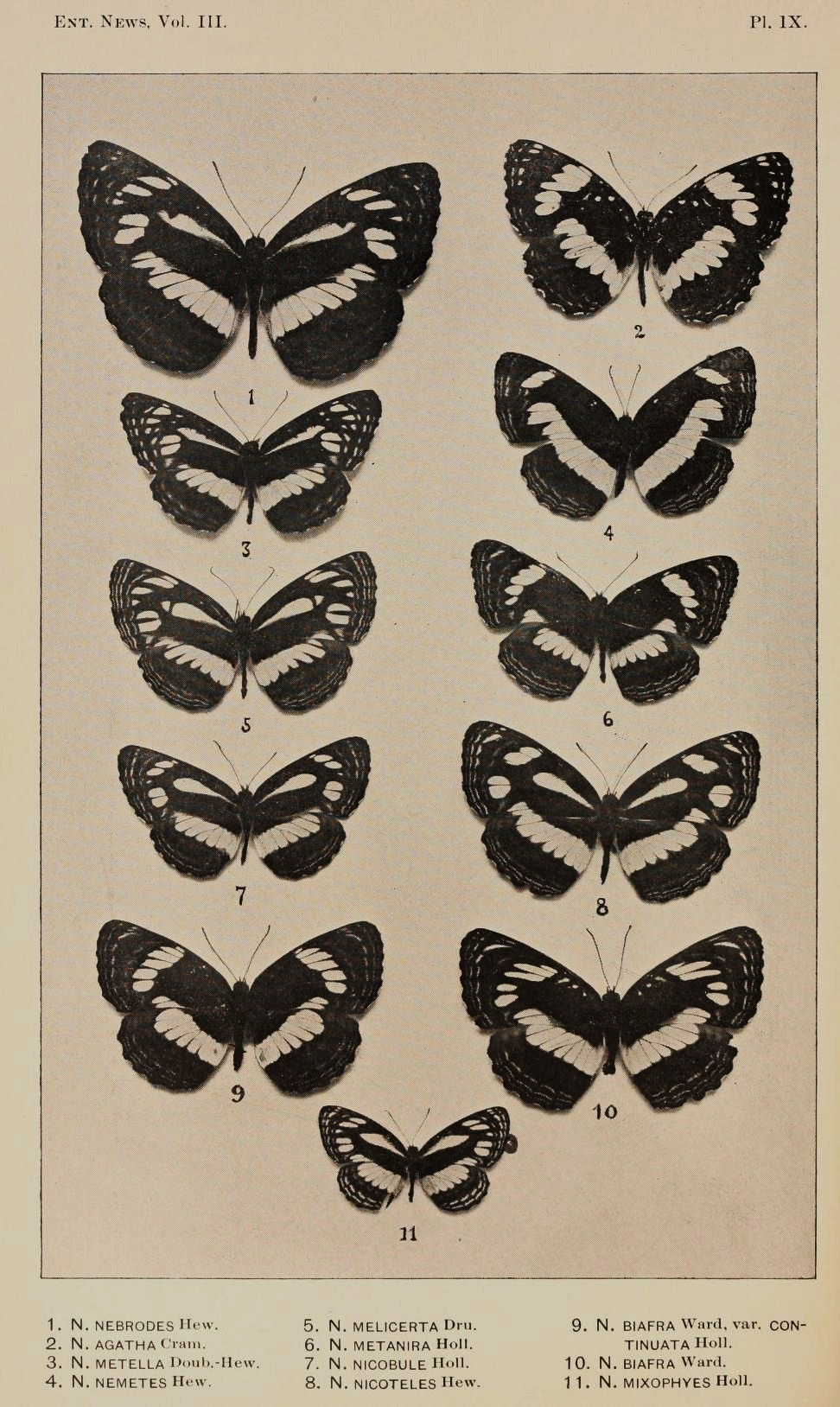
African Neptis. Distinguishing the species involves study of the configuration of the white spots, bars and submarginal lines on both wing surfaces.

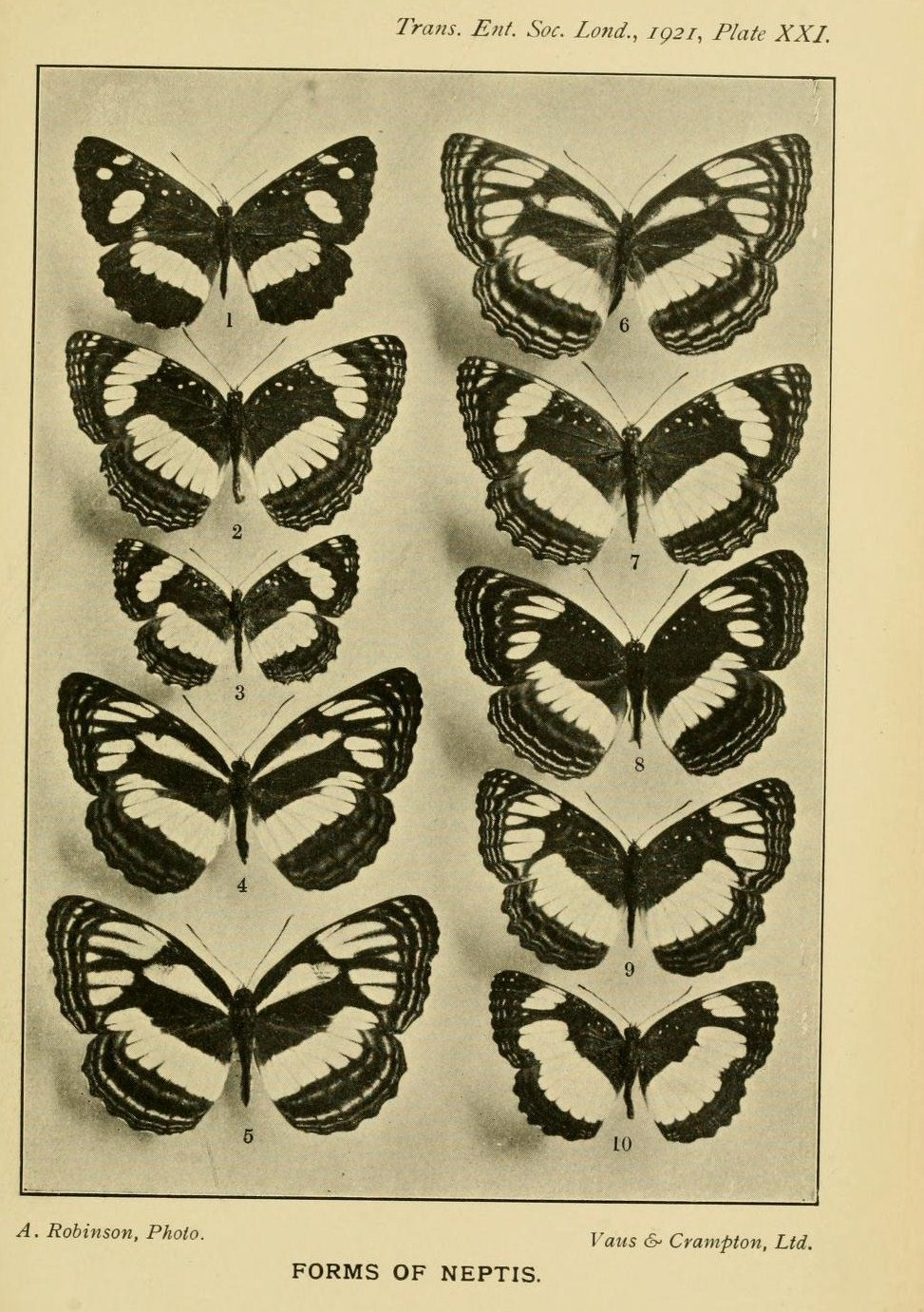
African Neptis. Plate accompanying a classic study by Harry Eltringham

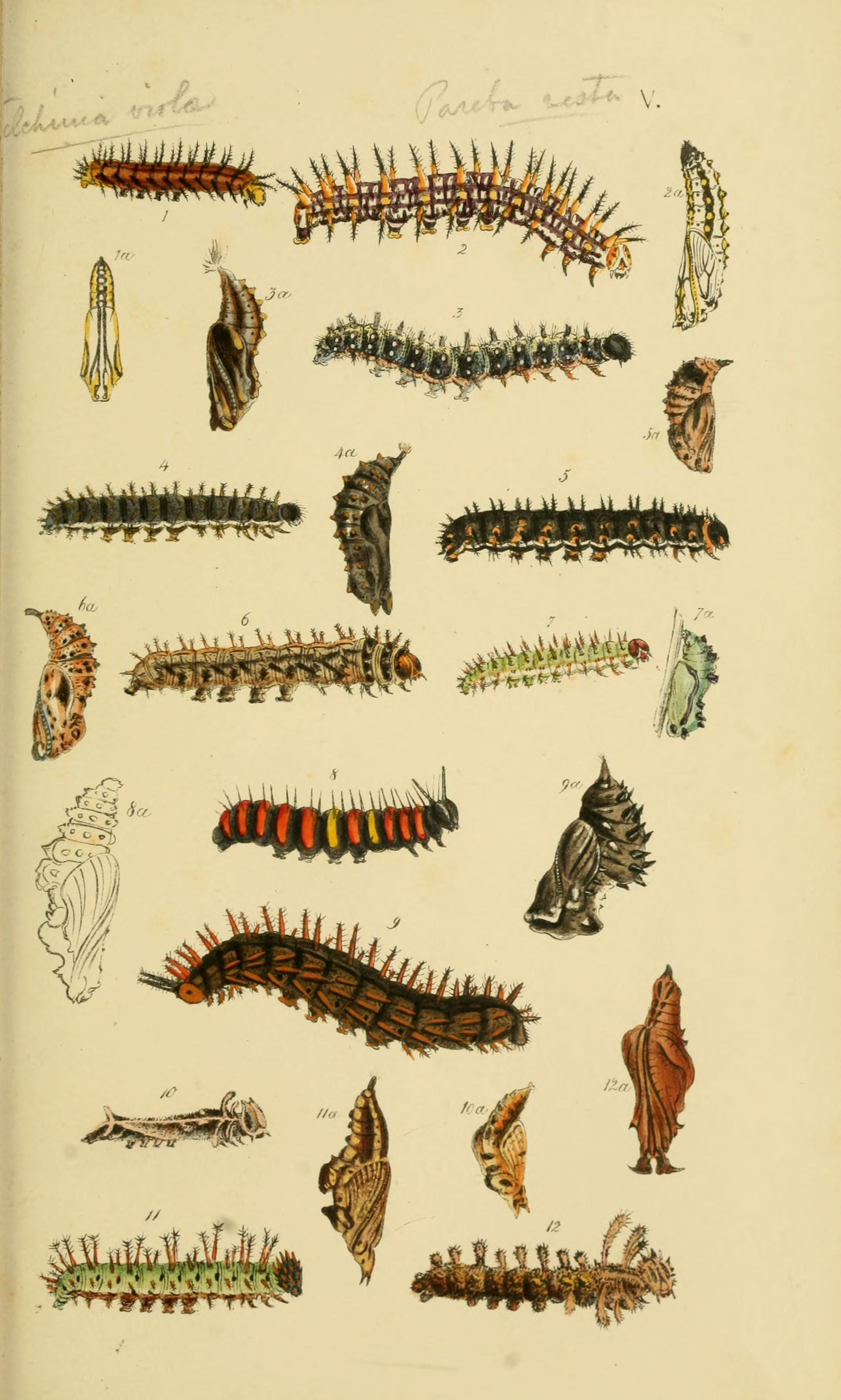
Larva and pupa, figures 10 and 10a

== Distribution ==
About 65 species occur in the Afrotropical realm, over 40 in the Palearctic realm 6 in the Australasian realm and about 50 occur in the Indomalayan realm.

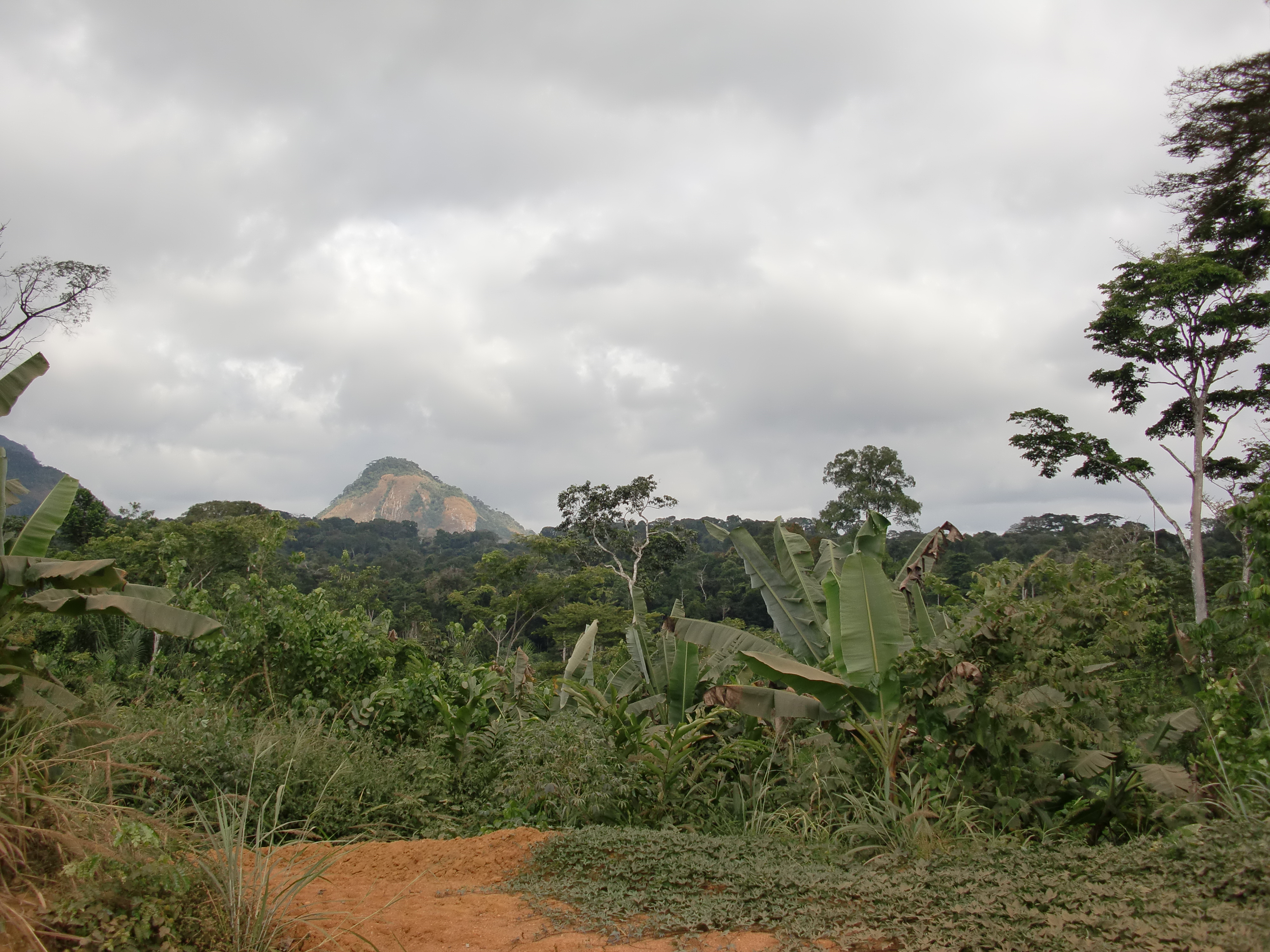
Forest in Equatorial Guinea

== Habitat ==
Neptis are forest, including rainforest and secondary forest, butterflies. They are also found in lightly wooded areas and gardens.

== Biology ==
Larval food plants come from the families Fabaceae, Rhamnaceae, Euphorbiaceae, Polygonaceae, Sapindaceae, Urticaceae and Connaraceae.

Adults have a "sailing" flight flapping their wings and then gliding. They frequently perch and visit flowers for nectar and damp patches where they imbibe salts and other nutrients. Adult uppersides exhibit disruptive coloration, This species has been observed to make sounds whose function has not been established.

== Taxonomy ==
Neptis are allied to Pantoporia, in which the white wing markings are replaced by orange and to Athyma resemble Neptis but have more triangular forewings. The type species of the genus is Papilio aceris Esper.

== Species ==
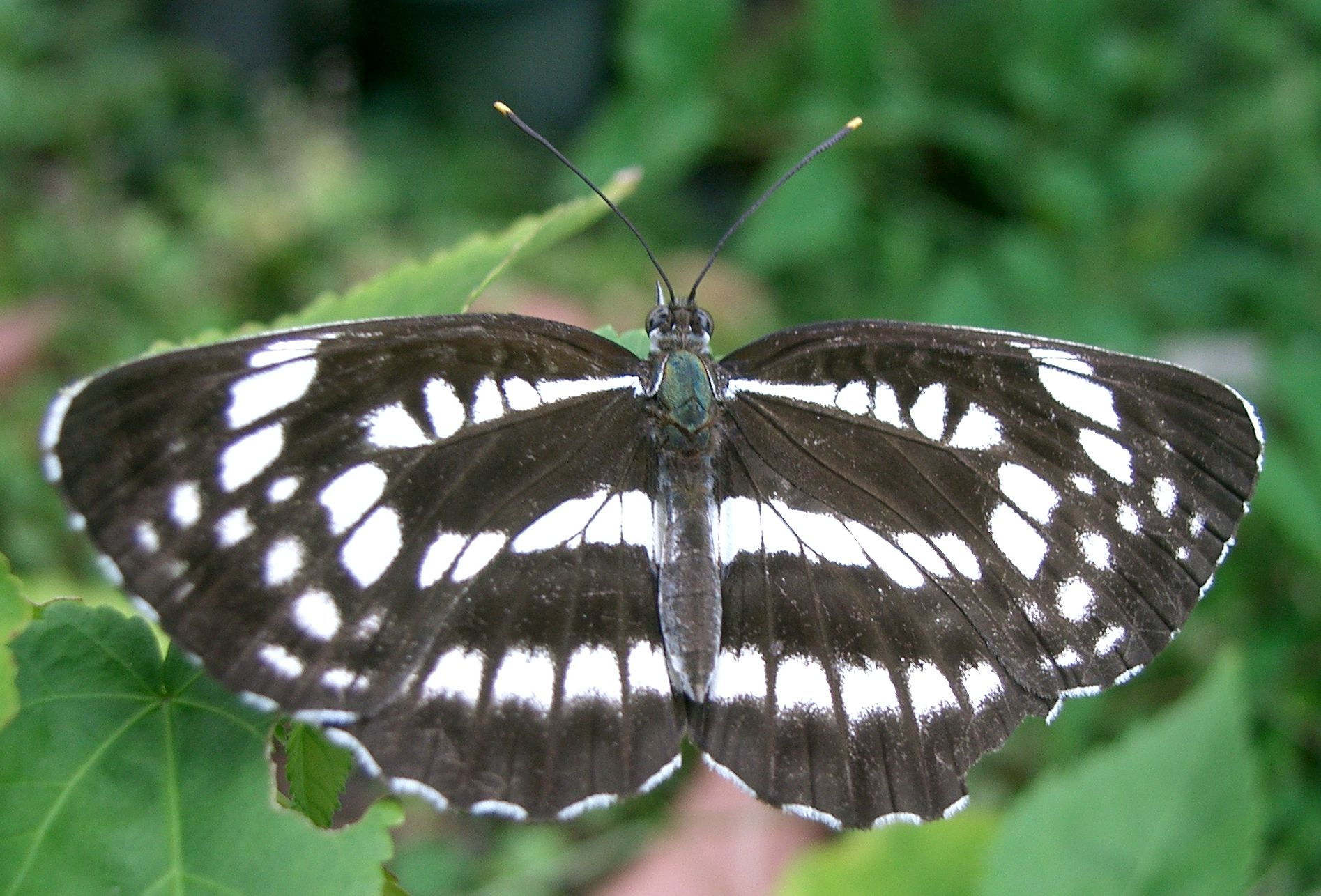
Neptis pryeri

Species include:

- Neptis agatha Cramer 1782
- Neptis agouale Pierre-Baltus, 1978
- Neptis alta Overlaet, 1955
- Neptis alwina Bremer & Grey, 1853
- Neptis amieti Pierre-Baltus, 2007
- Neptis ananta Moore, 1858 – yellow sailer
- Neptis angusta Condamin, 1966
- Neptis anjana Moore, 1881 – rich sailer
- Neptis antilope Leech, 1892 – variegated sailer
- Neptis arachne Leech, 1890
- Neptis armandia Oberthür, 1876
- Neptis aurivillii Schultze, 1913
- Neptis beroe Leech, 1890
- Neptis biafra Ward, 1871
- Neptis brebissonii Boisduval, 1832
- Neptis camarensis Schultze, 1917
- Neptis carcassoni van Son, 1959 – Carcasson's streaked sailer
- Neptis carlsbergi Collins & Larsen, 2005
- Neptis carpenteri Eltringham, 1922
- Neptis cartica Moore, 1872 – plain sailer
- Neptis celebica Moore, 1899 - Celebes sailer
- Neptis choui Yuan & Wang, 1994
- Neptis clarei Neave, 1904 – Clare's sailer
- Neptis claude Collins & Larsen, 2005
- Neptis clinia Moore, 1872 – clear sailer
- Neptis clinioides de Nicéville, 1894
- Neptis columella (Cramer, [1780])
- Neptis comorarum Oberthür, 1890
- Neptis conspicua Neave, 1904
- Neptis constantiae Carcasson, 1961 – Constance's sailer
- Neptis continuata Holland, 1892
- Neptis cormilloti Turlin, 1994
- Neptis cydippe Leech, 1890 – Chinese yellow sailer
- Neptis cymela C. & R. Felder, 1863
- Neptis decaryi Le Cerf, 1928
- Neptis dejeani Oberthür, 1894
- Neptis dentifera Schultze, 1917
- Neptis divisa Oberthür, 1908
- Neptis dumetorum Boisduval, 1833
- Neptis duryodana Moore, 1858
- Neptis eltringhami Joicey & Talbot, 1926
- Neptis esakii Nomura, 1935
- Neptis exaleuca Karsch, 1894
- Neptis felisimilis Schröder & Treadaway, 1983
- Neptis frobenia (Fabricius, 1798)
- Neptis goochi Trimen, 1879 – (small) streaked sailer
- Neptis gracilis (Kirsch, 1885)
- Neptis gratiosa Overlaet, 1955
- †Neptis guamensis Swinhoe, 1916
- Neptis guia Chou & Wang, 1994
- Neptis harita Moore, 1875 – (Indian) dingiest sailer
- Neptis hesione Leech, 1890
- Neptis hylas (Linnaeus, 1758) – common sailer
- Neptis ida Moore, 1858
- Neptis ilira Kheil, 1884
- Neptis incongrua Butler, 1896
- Neptis infusa Birket-Smith, 1960
- Neptis ioannis Eliot, 1959
- Neptis jamesoni Godman & Salvin, 1890
- Neptis jordani Neave, 1910 – Jordan's sailer
- Neptis jumbah Moore, 1857 – chestnut-streaked sailer
- Neptis katama Collins & Larsen, 1991
- Neptis kikideli Boisduval, 1833
- Neptis kikuyuensis Jackson, 1951 – Kikuyu sailer
- Neptis kiriakoffi Overlaet, 1955 – Kiriakoff's sailer
- Neptis laeta Overlaet, 1955 – common sailer
- Neptis lamtoensis Pierre-Baltus, 2007
- Neptis larseni Wojtusiak & Pyrcz, 1997
- Neptis latvitta Strand, 1909
- Neptis lermanni Aurivillius, 1896
- Neptis leucoporos Fruhstorfer, 1908
- Neptis liberti Pierre & Pierre-Baltus, 1998
- Neptis livingstonei Suffert, 1904
- Neptis loma Condamin, 1971
- Neptis lugubris Rebel, 1914
- Neptis magadha C. & R. Felder, 1867
- Neptis mahendra Moore, 1872 – Himalayan sailer
- Neptis manasa Moore, 1857 – pale hockeystick sailer
- Neptis marci Collins & Larsen, 1998
- Neptis matilei Pierre-Balthus, 2000
- Neptis mayottensis Oberthür, 1890
- Neptis melicerta (Drury, 1773) – streaked sailer
- Neptis meloria Oberthür, 1906
- Neptis metalla Doubleday & Hewitson
- Neptis metanira Holland, 1892
- Neptis metella Doubleday & Hewitson, 1850
- Neptis miah Moore, 1858
- Neptis mindorana C. & R. Felder, 1863
- Neptis mixophyes Holland, 1892
- Neptis morosa Overlaet, 1955 – morose sailer
- Neptis mpassae Pierre-Baltus, 2007
- Neptis multiscoliata Pierre-Baltus, 2007
- Neptis najo Karsch, 1893
- Neptis namba Tytler, 1915
- Neptis nandina Moore, 1858
- Neptis narayana Moore, 1858 – broadstick sailer
- Neptis nashona Swinhoe, 1896 – less rich sailer
- Neptis nata Moore, 1858 – dirty sailer
- Neptis nausicaa de Nicéville, 1897
- Neptis nebrodes Hewitson, 1874
- Neptis nemetes Hewitson, 1868
- Neptis nemorosa Oberthür, 1906
- Neptis nemorum Oberthür, 1906
- Neptis nicobule Holland, 1892
- Neptis nicomedes Hewitson, 1874
- Neptis nicoteles Hewitson, 1874
- Neptis nigra Pierre-Baltus, 2007
- Neptis nina Staudinger, 1896 – tiny sailer
- Neptis nisaea de Nicéville, 1894
- Neptis nitetis Hewitson, 1868
- Neptis noyala Oberthür, 1906
- Neptis nycteus de Nicéville, 1890 – hockeystick sailer
- Neptis nysiades Hewitson, 1868
- Neptis occidentalis Rothschild, 1918
- Neptis ochracea Neave, 1904
- Neptis omeroda Moore, 1875
- Neptis pampanga C. & R. Felder, 1863
- Neptis paula Staudinger, 1895
- Neptis penningtoni van Son, 1977 – Pennington's sailer
- Neptis philyra Ménétriés, 1858
- Neptis philyroides Staudinger, 1887
- Neptis poultoni Eltringham, 1921
- Neptis praslini (Boisduval, 1832)
- Neptis pryeri Butler, 1871
- Neptis pseudonamba Huang, 2001
- Neptis pseudovikasi (Moore, 1899)
- Neptis puella Aurivillius, 1894
- Neptis quintilla Mabille, 1890
- Neptis radha Moore, 1857 – great yellow sailer
- Neptis reducta Fruhstorfer, 1908
- Neptis rivularis (Scopoli, 1763) – Hungarian glider
- Neptis rogersi Eltringham, 1921 – Roger's sailer
- Neptis rothschildi Eltringham, 1921
- Neptis rosa Pierre-Baltus, 2007
- Neptis saclava Boisduval, 1833 – spotted sailer
- Neptis sangangi Huang, 2001
- Neptis sankara (Kollar, 1844) – broad-banded sailer
- Neptis sappho (Pallas, 1771) – common glider or Pallas' sailer
- Neptis satina Grose-Smith, 1894
- Neptis sedata Sasaki, 1982
- Neptis seeldrayersi Aurivillius, 1895
- Neptis serena Overlaet, 1955 – river sailer
- Neptis sextilla Mabille, 1882
- Neptis sinocartica Chou & Wang, 1994
- Neptis soma Moore, 1858 – sullied sailer
- Neptis speyeri Staudinger, 1887
- Neptis stellata Pierre-Baltus, 2007
- Neptis strigata Aurivillius, 1894
- Neptis sunica Eliot, 1969
- Neptis swynnertoni Trimen, 1912
- Neptis sylvana Oberthür, 1906
- Neptis taiwana Fruhstorfer, 1908
- Neptis theodora Oberthür, 1906
- Neptis thestias Leech, 1892
- Neptis thetis Leech, 1890
- Neptis trigonophora Butler, 1878 – barred sailer
- Neptis troundi Pierre-Baltus, 1978
- Neptis vibusa Semper, 1889
- Neptis vikasi Horsfield, 1829 – dingy sailer
- Neptis vindo Pierre-Baltus, 1978
- Neptis vingerhoedti Pierre-Baltus, 2003
- Neptis viridis Pierre-Baltus, 2007
- Neptis woodwardi Sharpe, 1899 – Woodward's sailer
- Neptis yerburii Butler, 1886 – Yerbury's sailer
- Neptis zaida Westwood, 1850 – pale-green sailer
