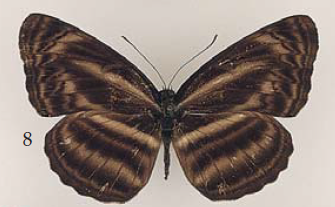

Scientific classification
- Domain: Eukaryota
- Kingdom: Animalia
- Phylum: Arthropoda
- Class: Insecta
- Order: Lepidoptera
- Family: Nymphalidae
- Genus: Neptis
- Species: N. celebica

Binomial name
- Neptis celebica Moore, 1899

Synonyms
- Bimbisara celebica Moore, 1899; Neptis vikasi celebica Fruhstorfer, 1908

= Neptis celebica =

Species of butterfly

Neptis celebica, the Celebes sailer, is a species of nymphalid butterfly found in Sulawesi.

The species was described by Frederic Moore on the basis of a female specimen. Wingspan 2.9 inches. Female according to Moore larger than the Javanese vikasi, with broader median bands on hindwing and darker under surface which is more brown than white. Male [then} unknown. South Celebes.

== Subspecies ==
- Neptis celebica celebica
- Neptis celebica oresta Fruhstorfer, 1913
- Neptis celebica arachroa Fruhstorfer, 1913
