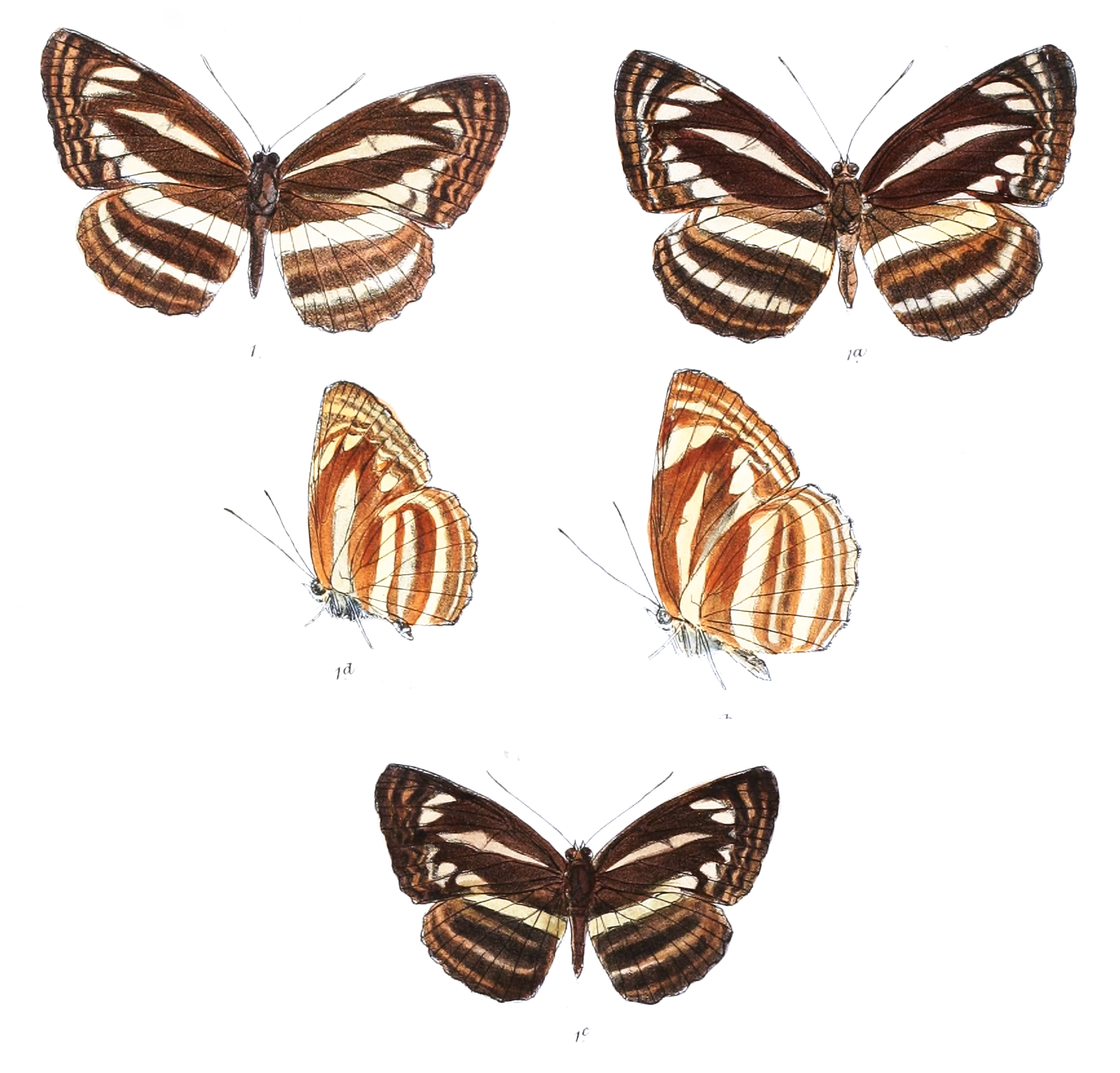

Scientific classification
- Domain: Eukaryota
- Kingdom: Animalia
- Phylum: Arthropoda
- Class: Insecta
- Order: Lepidoptera
- Family: Nymphalidae
- Genus: Neptis
- Species: N. cartica

Binomial name
- Neptis cartica Moore, 1872

Synonyms
- Neptis burmana de Nicéville, 1886

= Neptis cartica =

Plain sailer

Species of butterfly

Neptis cartica, the plain sailer, is a species of nymphalid butterfly found in South Asia.

N. cartica displays above the ordinary Neptis character, agreeing in its design so closely with nandina etc. that it is frequently mistaken for it. But the markings of the under surface of the hindwing are so characteristic that I [Fruhstorfer] am surprised that Moore subordinated it to his Genus ‘Bimbisara’ rather than founding a new Genus on it. For cartica is the only white Neptis lacking on the under surface of hindwing the whitish subbasal band, a characteristic shared by anjana Moore and Neptis ananta Moore, 1858 belonging to the yellow Neptis.Moreover, the hindwing has the white basal spot broader and more conspicuous than in any other species. This fundamental characteristic which unites cartica with anjana-antana, has hitherto not been mentioned by any of the authorities on Indian Lepidoptera.

== Subspecies ==
- Neptis cartica cartica (Nepal, Sikkim, Bhutan, Assam, northern Burma, northern Vietnam)
- Neptis cartica burmana de Nicéville, 1886 (southern Burma, northern Thailand) luxuriant white markings
- Neptis cartica pagoda Yoshino, 1997 (Yunnan)
