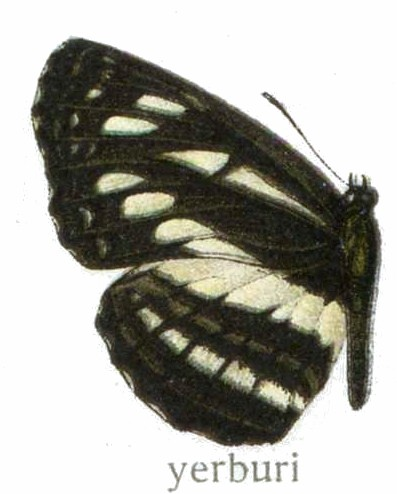
- Upperside, from Adalbert Seitz

Scientific classification
- Kingdom: Animalia
- Phylum: Arthropoda
- Class: Insecta
- Order: Lepidoptera
- Family: Nymphalidae
- Genus: Neptis
- Species: N. yerburii

Binomial name
- Neptis yerburii Butler, 1886

= Neptis yerburii =

Yerbury's sailer

Species of butterfly

Neptis yerburii, or Yerbury's sailer, is a nymphalid butterfly found in India, (Assam and Sikkim), parts of China, Burma and Thailand. The species is named after the collector of the type specimen John William Yerbury.

== Gallery ==
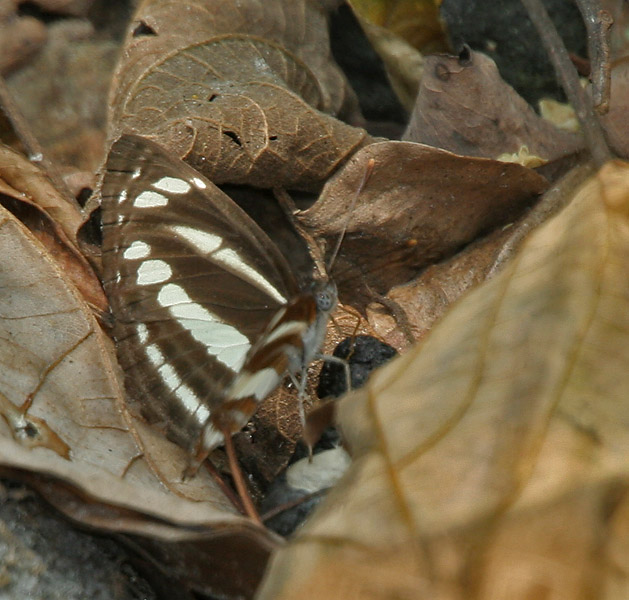
At Jayanti in Buxa Tiger Reserve in Jalpaiguri district of West Bengal, India

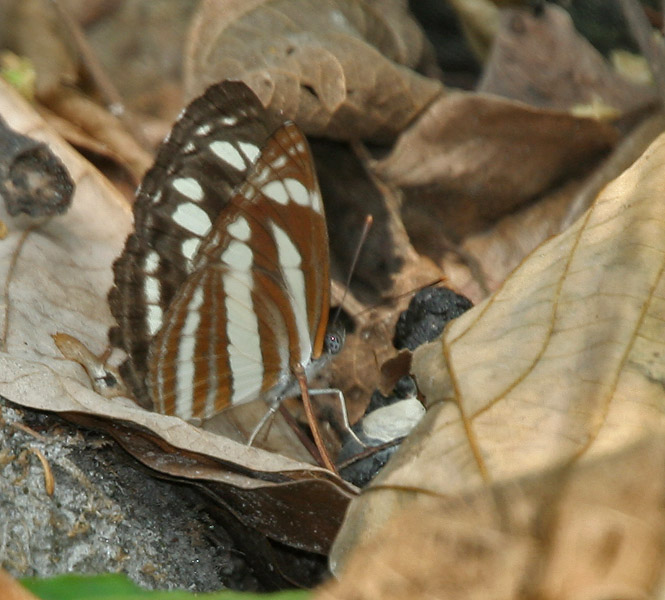
At Jayanti in Buxa Tiger Reserve

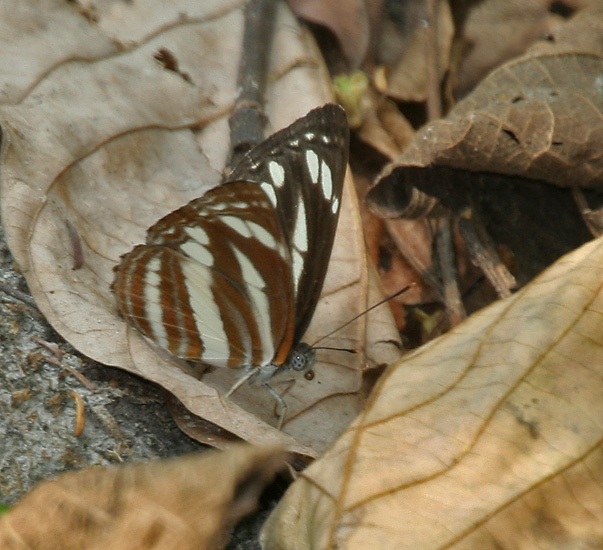
At Jayanti in Buxa Tiger Reserve
