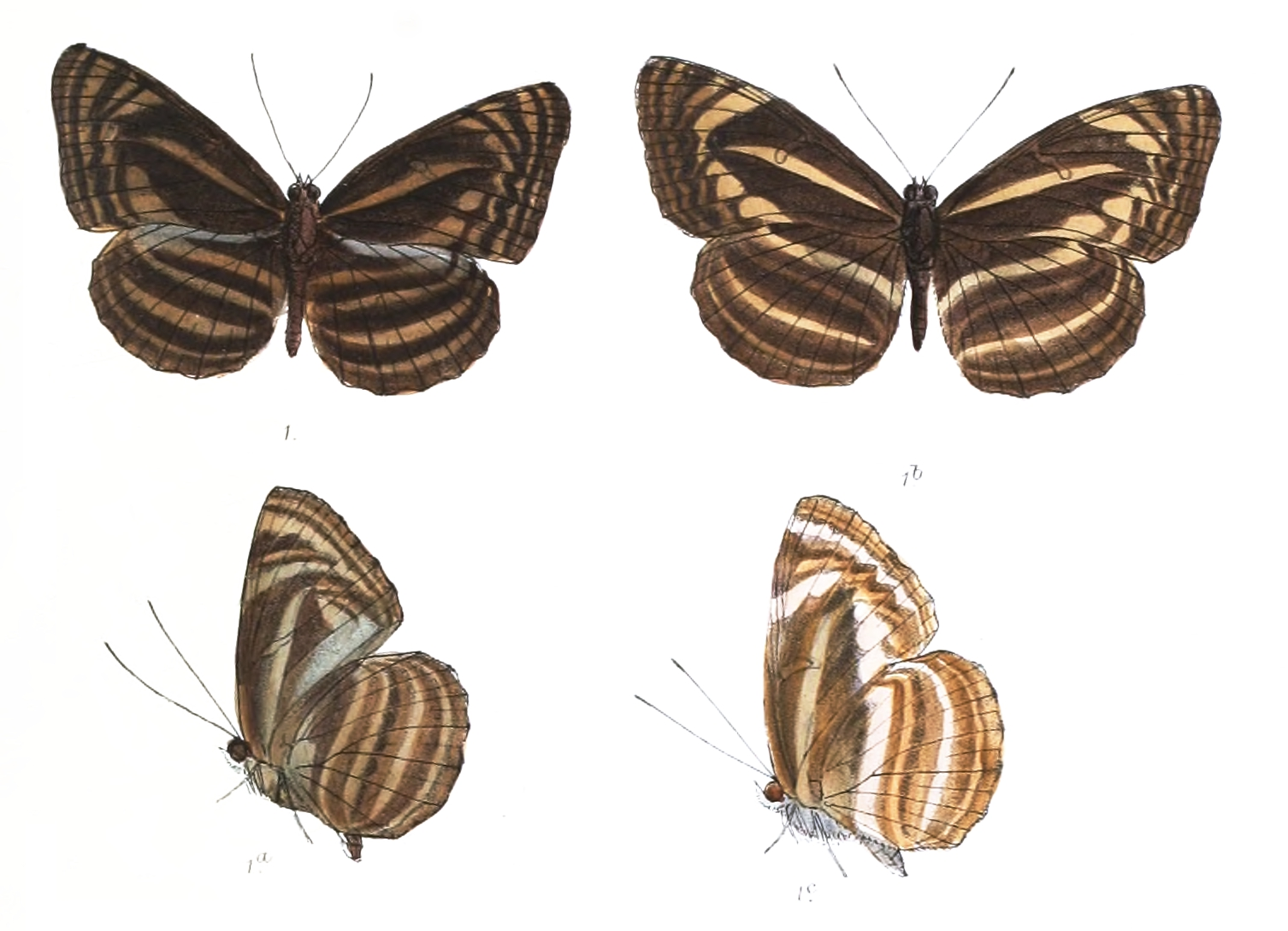

Scientific classification
- Domain: Eukaryota
- Kingdom: Animalia
- Phylum: Arthropoda
- Class: Insecta
- Order: Lepidoptera
- Family: Nymphalidae
- Genus: Neptis
- Species: N. omeroda

Binomial name
- Neptis omeroda Moore, [1875]

Synonyms
- Neptis infuscata Hagen, 1898

= Neptis omeroda =

Species of butterfly

Neptis omeroda is a species of nymphalid butterfly found in Asia.

== Subspecies ==
- Neptis omeroda omeroda (Thailand, Malaya, Sumatra, Bangka, Borneo, Java)
- Neptis omeroda infuscata Hagen, 1898 (Mentawai Island)
- Neptis omeroda batunensis Fruhstorfer, 1912 (Batu Island)
- Neptis omeroda kahoga Fruhstorfer, 1908 (Nias)
