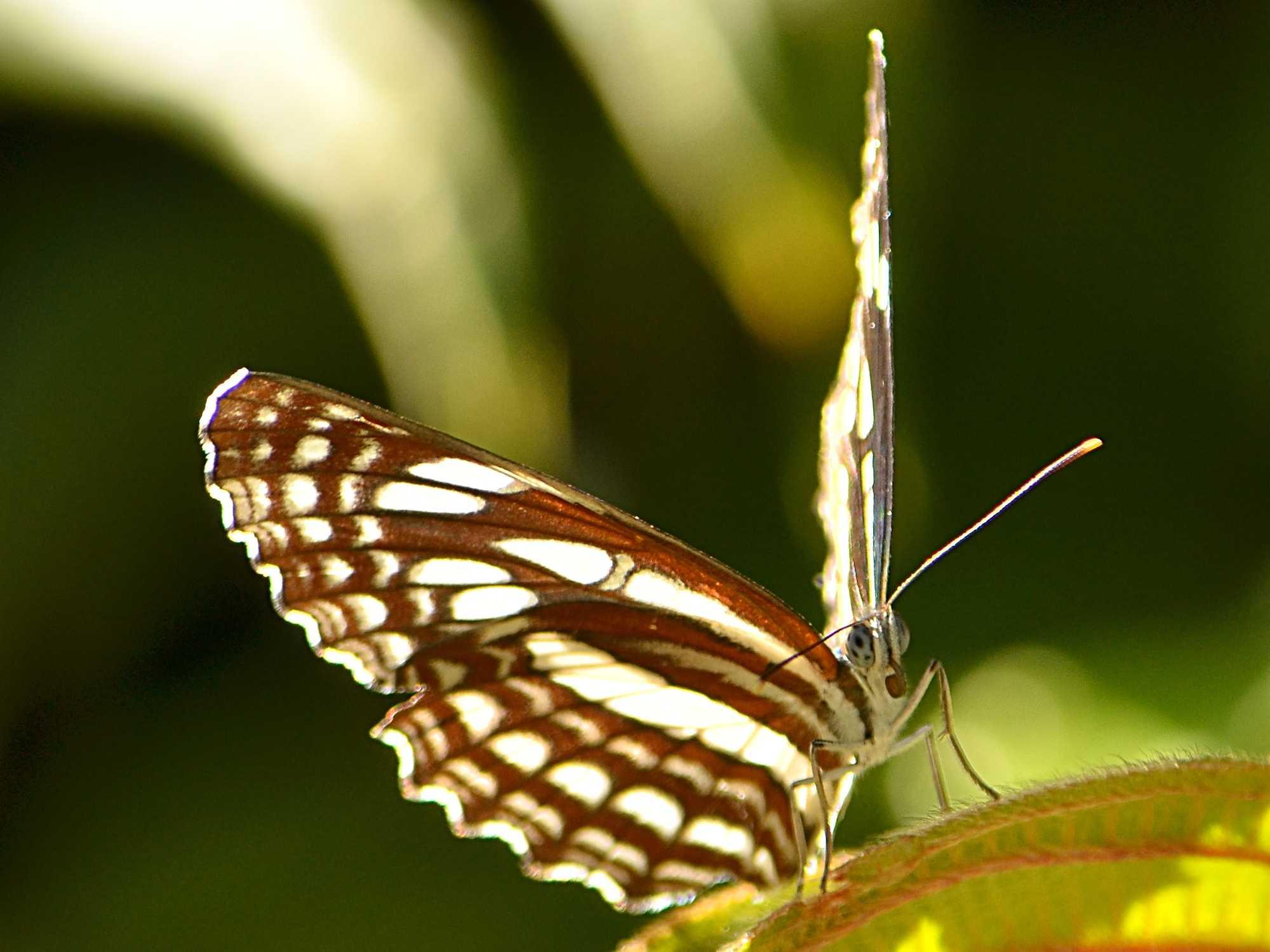
- At Mt. Mahawu, North Sulawesi

Scientific classification
- Kingdom: Animalia
- Phylum: Arthropoda
- Clade: Pancrustacea
- Class: Insecta
- Order: Lepidoptera
- Family: Nymphalidae
- Genus: Neptis
- Species: N. ida

Binomial name
- Neptis ida Moore, 1858

Synonyms
- Neptis hylas ida f. sphaerica Fruhstorfer, 1907

= Neptis ida =

Species of butterfly

Neptis ida, is a butterfly in the family Nymphalidae.

== Subspecies ==
- Neptis ida ida (southern Sulawesi) f rather large size, underneath with chiefly white and narrower brown bands.
- Neptis ida carbonespersa Martin, 1924 (northern and central Sulawesi)
- Neptis ida celebensis Hopffer, 1874 (North-eastern Sulawesi: Minahasa) large, with rounded wings, beneath with broader and more red-brown bands
- Neptis ida kalidupa Eliot, 1969 (Tukangbesi Islands)
- Neptis ida liliputa Martin, 1924 (Butung, Muna, Kabaena)
- Neptis ida saleyra Fruhstorfer, 1908 (Selajar)
- Neptis ida sphaericus Fruhstorfer, 1907 (Sulawesi) much smaller and with elongate wings, the white markings dusted with dull grey scales; beneath the bands are pale ochreous
