= Neptis infusa =

Scientific classification
- Kingdom: Animalia
- Phylum: Arthropoda
- Class: Insecta
- Order: Lepidoptera
- Family: Nymphalidae
- Genus: Neptis
- Species: N. infusa

Binomial name
- Neptis infusa Birket-Smith, 1960

Species of butterfly

Neptis infusa is a butterfly in the family Nymphalidae. It is found in Cameroon.
