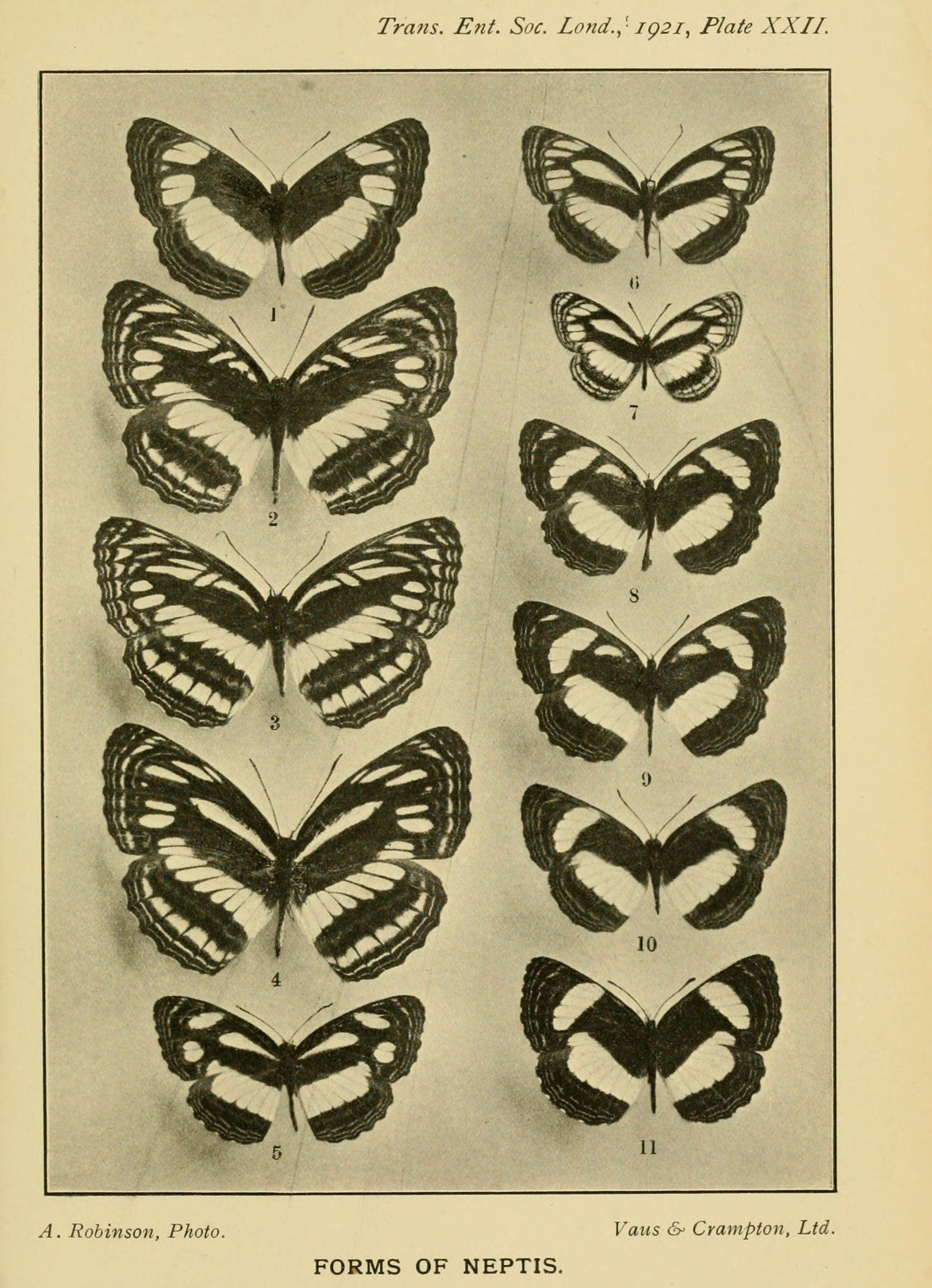
- Figure 3

Scientific classification
- Kingdom: Animalia
- Phylum: Arthropoda
- Clade: Pancrustacea
- Class: Insecta
- Order: Lepidoptera
- Family: Nymphalidae
- Genus: Neptis
- Species: N. paula

Binomial name
- Neptis paula Staudinger, 1896

= Neptis paula =

Species of butterfly

Neptis paula, or Paula's sailer, is a butterfly in the family Nymphalidae. It is found in Sierra Leone, Liberia, Ivory Coast, Ghana and western Nigeria. The habitat consists of forests.

Torben Larsen developed a species numbering system for his 2005 publication Butterflies of West Africa. This species is #926. The 'Larsen' numbers have since been used with permission in A Sharp Eye on Butterflies of Ghana.
