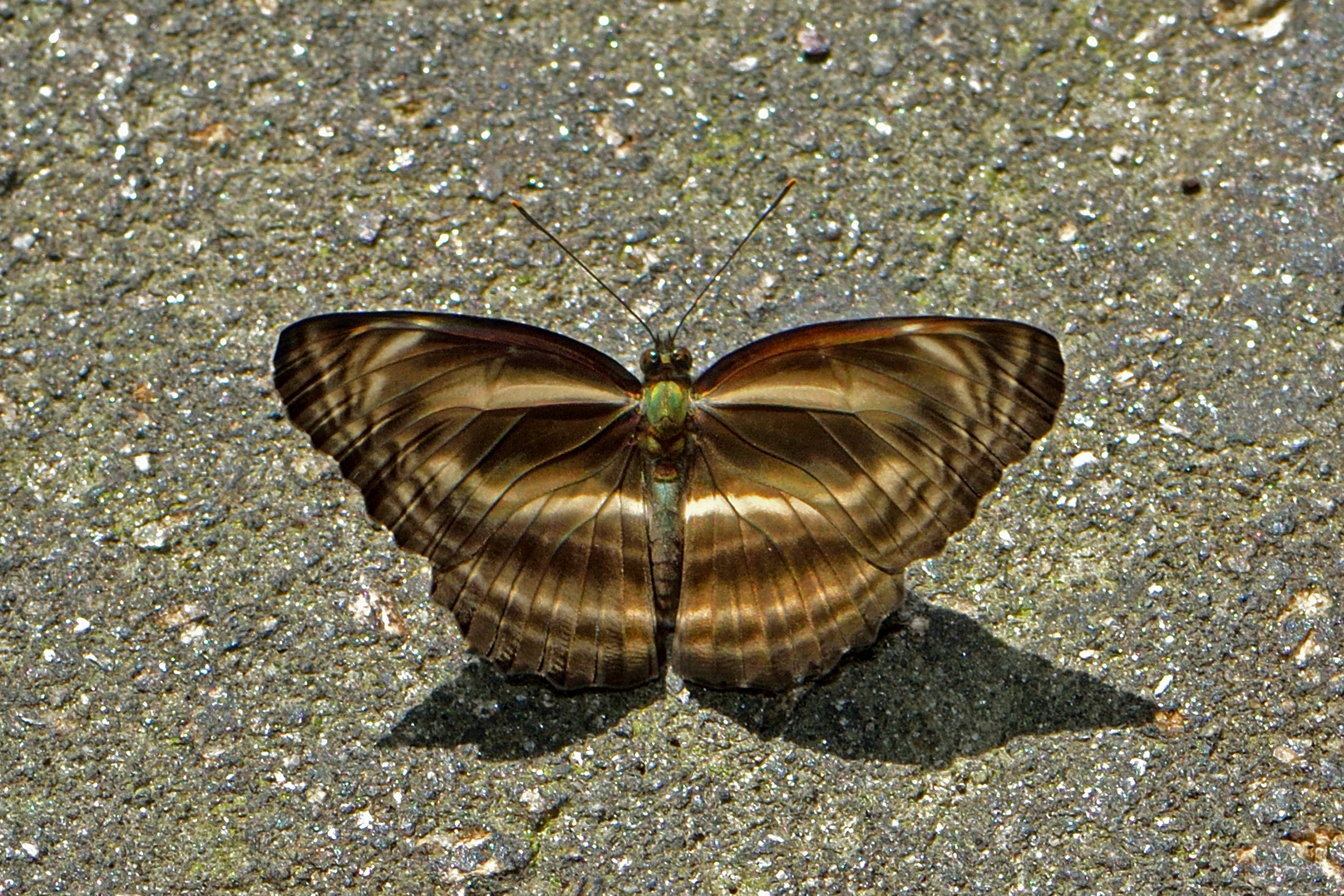

Scientific classification
- Kingdom: Animalia
- Phylum: Arthropoda
- Class: Insecta
- Order: Lepidoptera
- Family: Nymphalidae
- Genus: Neptis
- Species: N. harita

Binomial name
- Neptis harita (Moore, 1875)

= Neptis harita =

Indian dingiest sailer

Species of butterfly

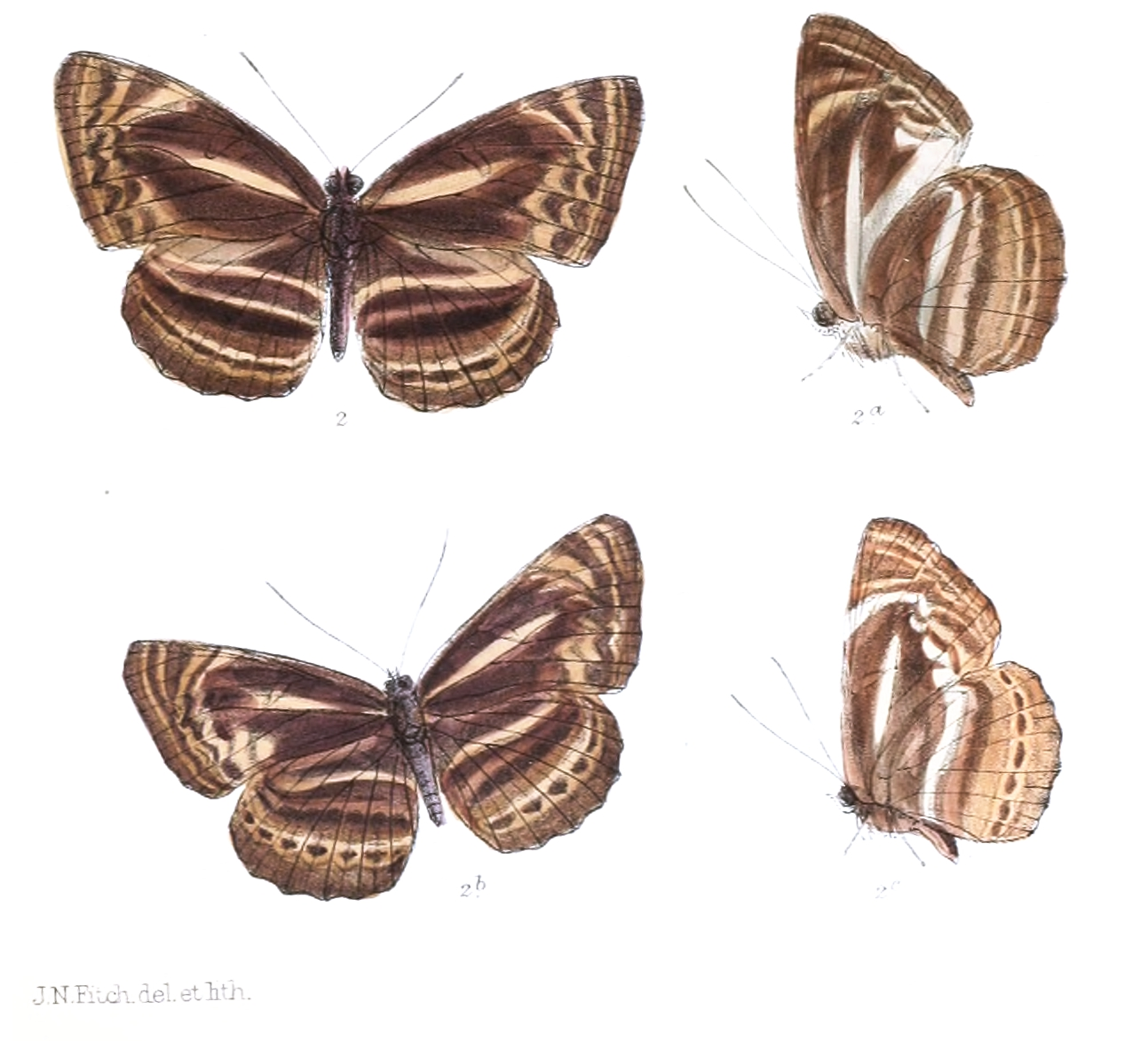

Neptis harita, the Indian dingiest sailer, is a species of nymphalid butterfly found in north-eastern India, Peninsular Malaysia, northern Indochina, southern Yunnan and Sumatra. The species was first described by Frederic Moore in 1875.

== Description ==
The bands above are grey-white, beneath yellowish-white, excepting the submarginal band which is violet.
