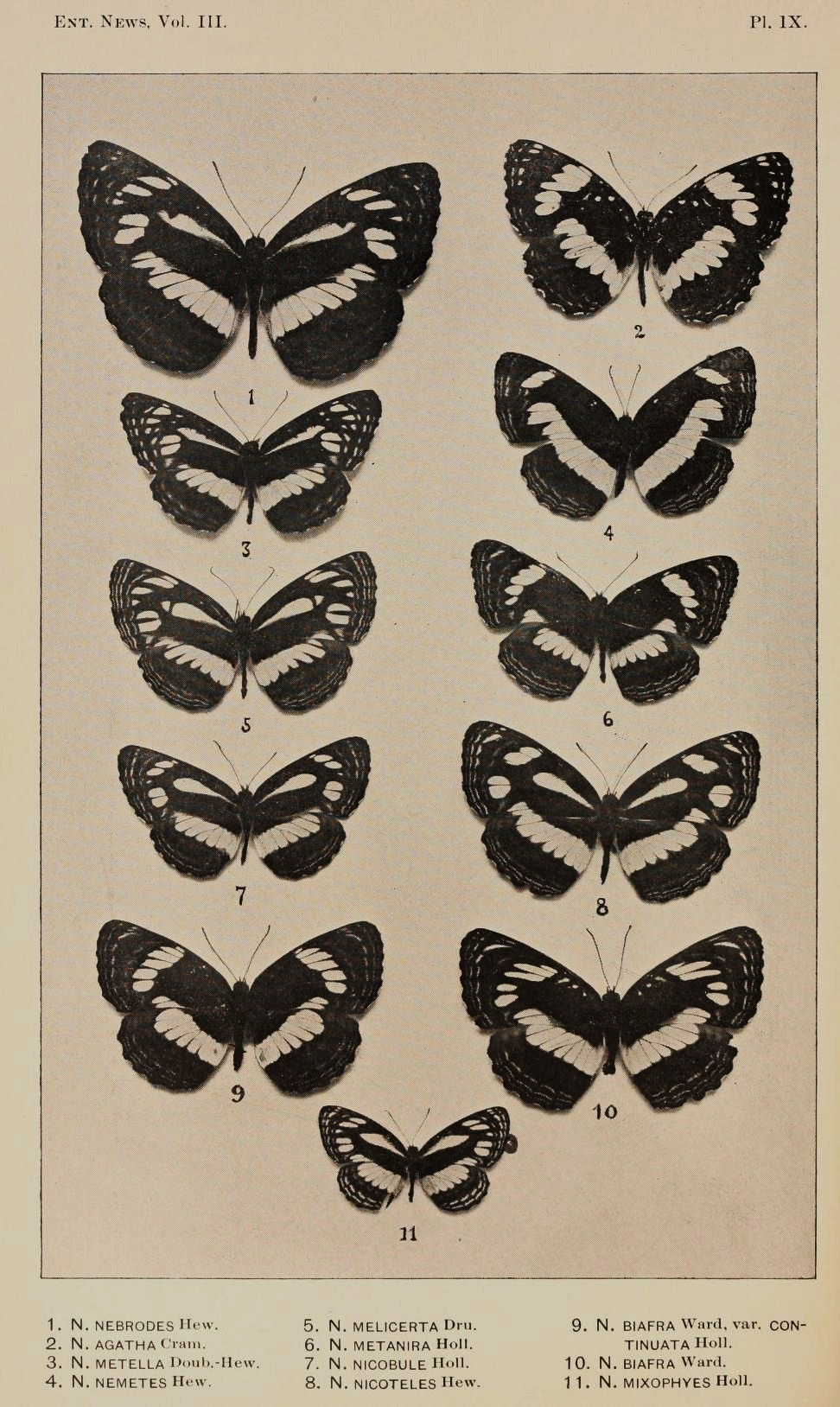
- Figure 6

Scientific classification
- Kingdom: Animalia
- Phylum: Arthropoda
- Class: Insecta
- Order: Lepidoptera
- Family: Nymphalidae
- Genus: Neptis
- Species: N. metanira

Binomial name
- Neptis metanira Holland, 1892

= Neptis metanira =

Species of butterfly

Neptis metanira, or Holland's sailer, is a butterfly in the family Nymphalidae. It is found in Ghana, Nigeria, Cameroon, Gabon, the Republic of the Congo and possibly the Democratic Republic of the Congo and Uganda. The habitat consists of forests.

== Original description ==
N. metanira sp. nov. male. — Allied to Neptis biafra Ward. — The wings are narrower and more produced than in biafra, and the margins are not scalloped, but even. The transverse band of white spots beyond the cell upon the primaries [forewings] is composed of six spots, the one on the costa minute, the three following large and fused together forming a transverse spot indented outwardly upon the nervules. This is followed by two divergent oval spots, of which the lower one is the smallest. The transverse median band upon the secondaries [hindwings] is relatively narrower than in biafra, and more deeply indented externally, and is clouded internally by pale fuscous. The submarginal lines are bright bluish, upon the underside the primaries have four marginal lines, while in biafra there are generally but three. Expanse 45 mm.

== Taxonomy ==
It is the nominotypical member of the metanira sub-group of the Neptis nysiades group (Species complex) The members of the subgroup are

- Neptis metanira
- Neptis ducarmei
- Neptisnginettae
- Neptis sobrina.
