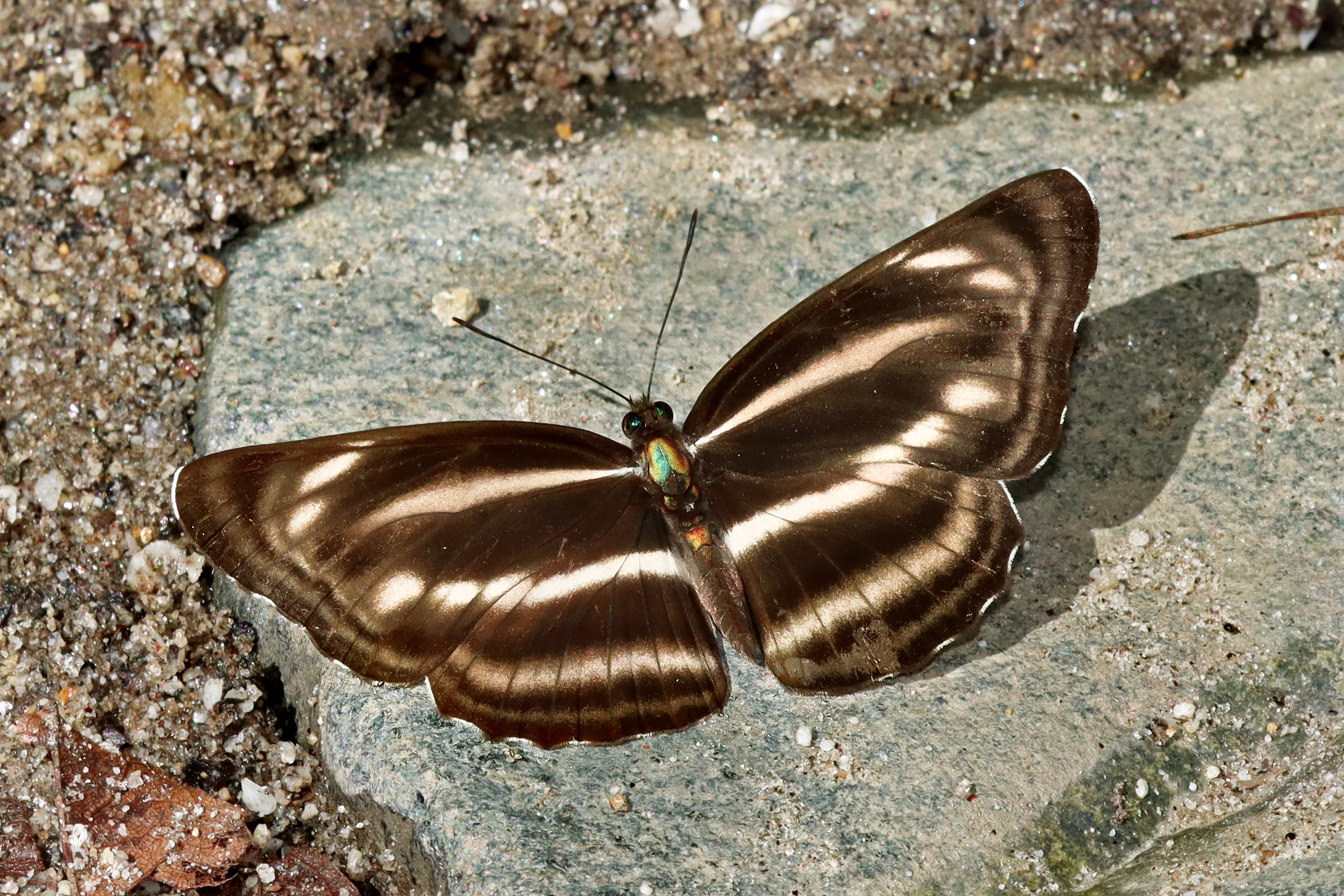

Scientific classification
- Domain: Eukaryota
- Kingdom: Animalia
- Phylum: Arthropoda
- Class: Insecta
- Order: Lepidoptera
- Family: Nymphalidae
- Genus: Neptis
- Species: N. nashona

Binomial name
- Neptis nashona C. Swinhoe, 1896

= Neptis nashona =

Species of butterfly

Neptis nashona, the less rich sailer, is a nymphalid butterfly found in Asia. The species was first described by Charles Swinhoe in 1896.

== Subspecies ==
- Neptis nashona nashona (Sikkim, Assam, northern Myanmar)
- Neptis nashona aagaardi Riley, 1932 (northern Thailand)
- Neptis nashona chapa Eliot, 1969 (Cochin China)
- Neptis nashona patricia Oberthür, 1906
