= Neptis amieti =

Scientific classification
- Kingdom: Animalia
- Phylum: Arthropoda
- Clade: Pancrustacea
- Class: Insecta
- Order: Lepidoptera
- Family: Nymphalidae
- Genus: Neptis
- Species: N. amieti

Binomial name
- Neptis amieti Pierre-Baltus, 2007

Species of butterfly

Neptis amieti is a butterfly in the family Nymphalidae. It is found in Gabon.

- Images at BOLD
