= Neptis carpenteri =

Scientific classification
- Kingdom: Animalia
- Phylum: Arthropoda
- Class: Insecta
- Order: Lepidoptera
- Family: Nymphalidae
- Genus: Neptis
- Species: N. carpenteri

Binomial name
- Neptis carpenteri d'Abrera, 1980

Species of butterfly

Neptis carpenteri is a butterfly in the family Nymphalidae. It is found in the eastern part of the Democratic Republic of the Congo, Uganda and north-western Tanzania.

It was first descied as Neptis nemetes f. carpenteri D'Abrera raised this to specific rank
