= Neptis claude =

Scientific classification
- Kingdom: Animalia
- Phylum: Arthropoda
- Class: Insecta
- Order: Lepidoptera
- Family: Nymphalidae
- Genus: Neptis
- Species: N. claude

Binomial name
- Neptis claude Collins & Larsen, 2005

Species of butterfly

Neptis claude, the large club sailer, is a butterfly in the family Nymphalidae. It is found in Nigeria (the Cross River loop) and western Cameroon. The habitat consists of primary forests.
