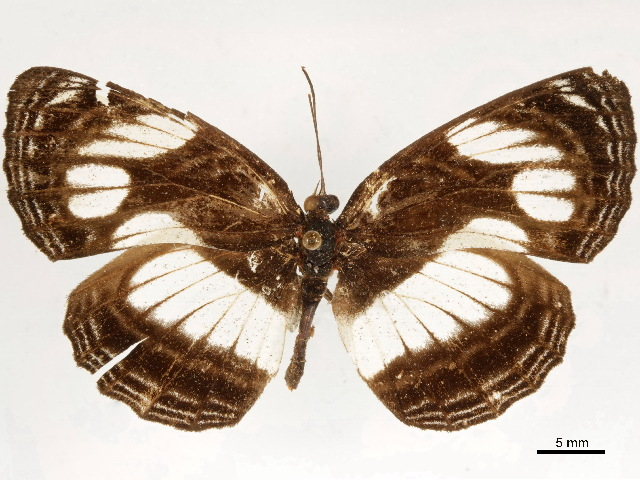

Scientific classification
- Kingdom: Animalia
- Phylum: Arthropoda
- Class: Insecta
- Order: Lepidoptera
- Family: Nymphalidae
- Genus: Neptis
- Species: N. lamtoensis

Binomial name
- Neptis lamtoensis Pierre-Baltus, 2007

= Neptis lamtoensis =

Species of butterfly

Neptis lamtoensis is a butterfly in the family Nymphalidae. It is found in Ivory Coast.
