= Neptis rosa =

Scientific classification
- Kingdom: Animalia
- Phylum: Arthropoda
- Class: Insecta
- Order: Lepidoptera
- Family: Nymphalidae
- Genus: Neptis
- Species: N. rosa

Binomial name
- Neptis rosa Pierre-Baltus, 2007

Species of butterfly

Neptis rosa is a butterfly in the family Nymphalidae. It is found in Gabon.

It is in the Neptis rosa sub-group Of the Neptis nysiades group (Species complex) It is the sole member of the subgroup. Images BOLD
