= Neptis larseni =

Conservation status
- Near Threatened (IUCN 3.1)

Scientific classification
- Kingdom: Animalia
- Phylum: Arthropoda
- Class: Insecta
- Order: Lepidoptera
- Family: Nymphalidae
- Genus: Neptis
- Species: N. larseni

Binomial name
- Neptis larseni Wojtusiak & Pyrcz, 1997

Species of butterfly

Neptis larseni (Príncipe sailer) is a butterfly in the family Nymphalidae. It is found on the island of Príncipe.
