= Neptis multiscoliata =

Scientific classification
- Kingdom: Animalia
- Phylum: Arthropoda
- Class: Insecta
- Order: Lepidoptera
- Family: Nymphalidae
- Genus: Neptis
- Species: N. multiscoliata

Binomial name
- Neptis multiscoliata Pierre-Baltus, 2007

Species of butterfly

Neptis multiscoliata is a butterfly in the family Nymphalidae. It is found in Gabon.
