= Neptis liberti =

Scientific classification
- Kingdom: Animalia
- Phylum: Arthropoda
- Class: Insecta
- Order: Lepidoptera
- Family: Nymphalidae
- Genus: Neptis
- Species: N. liberti

Binomial name
- Neptis liberti Pierre & Pierre-Baltus, 1998

Species of butterfly

Neptis liberti, or Libert's sailer, is a butterfly in the family Nymphalidae. It is found in Nigeria, Cameroon, Gabon and the Democratic Republic of the Congo. The habitat consists of forests.

The larvae feed on Tetrapleura thoningii.
