= Neptis penningtoni =

Scientific classification
- Kingdom: Animalia
- Phylum: Arthropoda
- Class: Insecta
- Order: Lepidoptera
- Family: Nymphalidae
- Genus: Neptis
- Species: N. penningtoni

Binomial name
- Neptis penningtoni van Son, 1977

Species of butterfly

Neptis penningtoni, or Pennington's sailer, is a butterfly in the family Nymphalidae. It is found in south-eastern Kenya, western Tanzania, Zambia, Mozambique, Zimbabwe and South Africa (Limpopo). The habitat consists of Brachystegia woodland, especially on wooded hills.

Adults are on wing in April and from July to December.

The larvae feed on Julbernardia globiflora. They prefer freshly emerged shoots of their host plant
