= Neptis vingerhoedti =

Scientific classification
- Kingdom: Animalia
- Phylum: Arthropoda
- Class: Insecta
- Order: Lepidoptera
- Family: Nymphalidae
- Genus: Neptis
- Species: N. vingerhoedti

Binomial name
- Neptis vingerhoedti Pierre-Baltus, 2003

Species of butterfly

Neptis vingerhoedti is a butterfly in the family Nymphalidae. It is found in the Democratic Republic of the Congo.
