= Neptis carlsbergi =

Scientific classification
- Kingdom: Animalia
- Phylum: Arthropoda
- Class: Insecta
- Order: Lepidoptera
- Family: Nymphalidae
- Genus: Neptis
- Species: N. carlsbergi

Binomial name
- Neptis carlsbergi Collins, S.C. & Larsen, 2005

Species of butterfly

Neptis carlsbergi, the Carlsberg sailer, is a butterfly in the family Nymphalidae. It is found in Nigeria.
