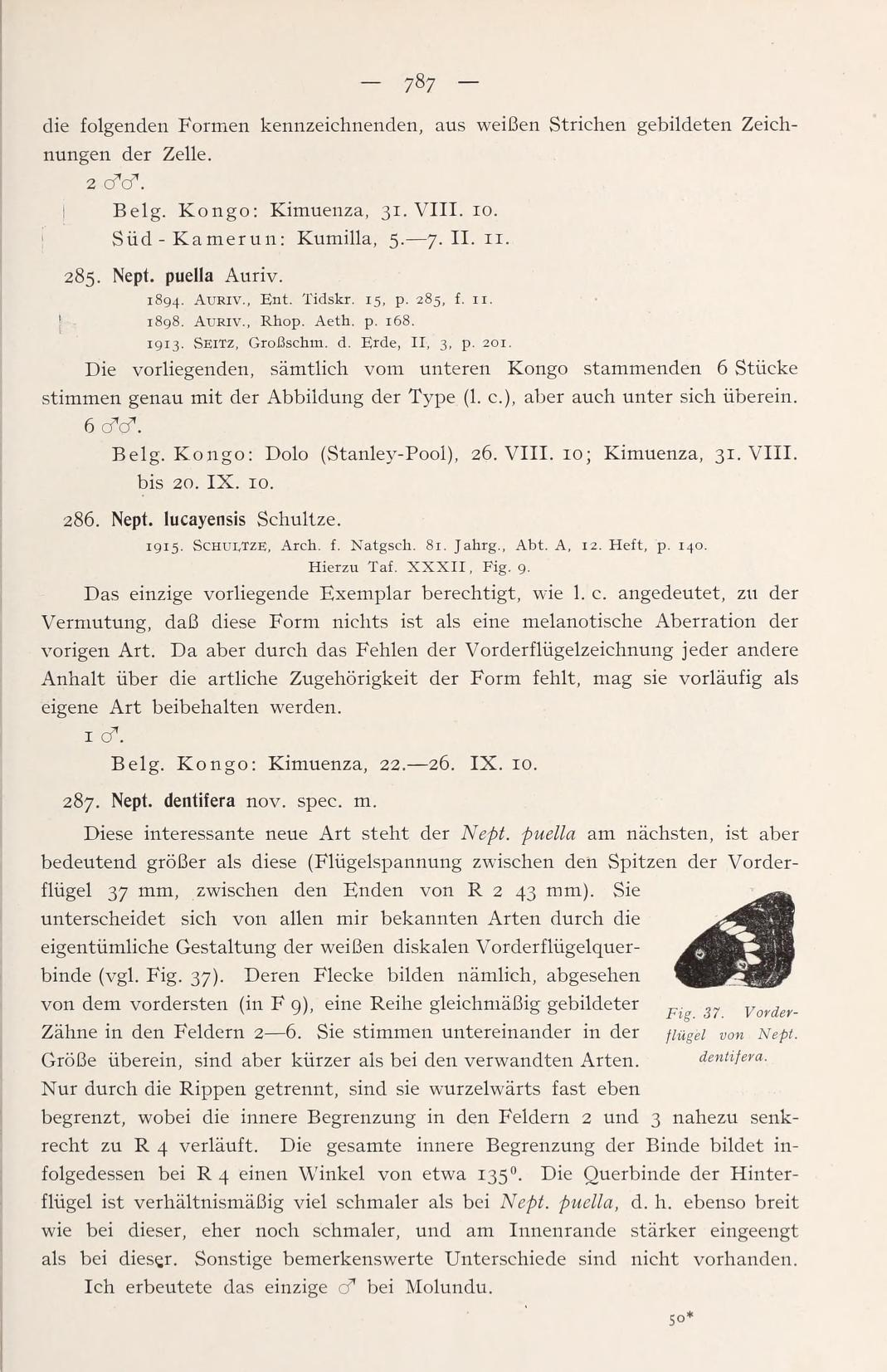
- Original description

Scientific classification
- Kingdom: Animalia
- Phylum: Arthropoda
- Class: Insecta
- Order: Lepidoptera
- Family: Nymphalidae
- Genus: Neptis
- Species: N. dentifera

Binomial name
- Neptis dentifera Schultze, 1920

= Neptis dentifera =

Species of butterfly

Neptis dentifera is a butterfly in the family Nymphalidae. It is found in Cameroon.
