= Neptis cormilloti =

Scientific classification
- Kingdom: Animalia
- Phylum: Arthropoda
- Class: Insecta
- Order: Lepidoptera
- Family: Nymphalidae
- Genus: Neptis
- Species: N. cormilloti

Binomial name
- Neptis cormilloti Turlin, 1994

Species of butterfly

Neptis cormilloti is a butterfly in the family Nymphalidae. It is found on the Comoros.
