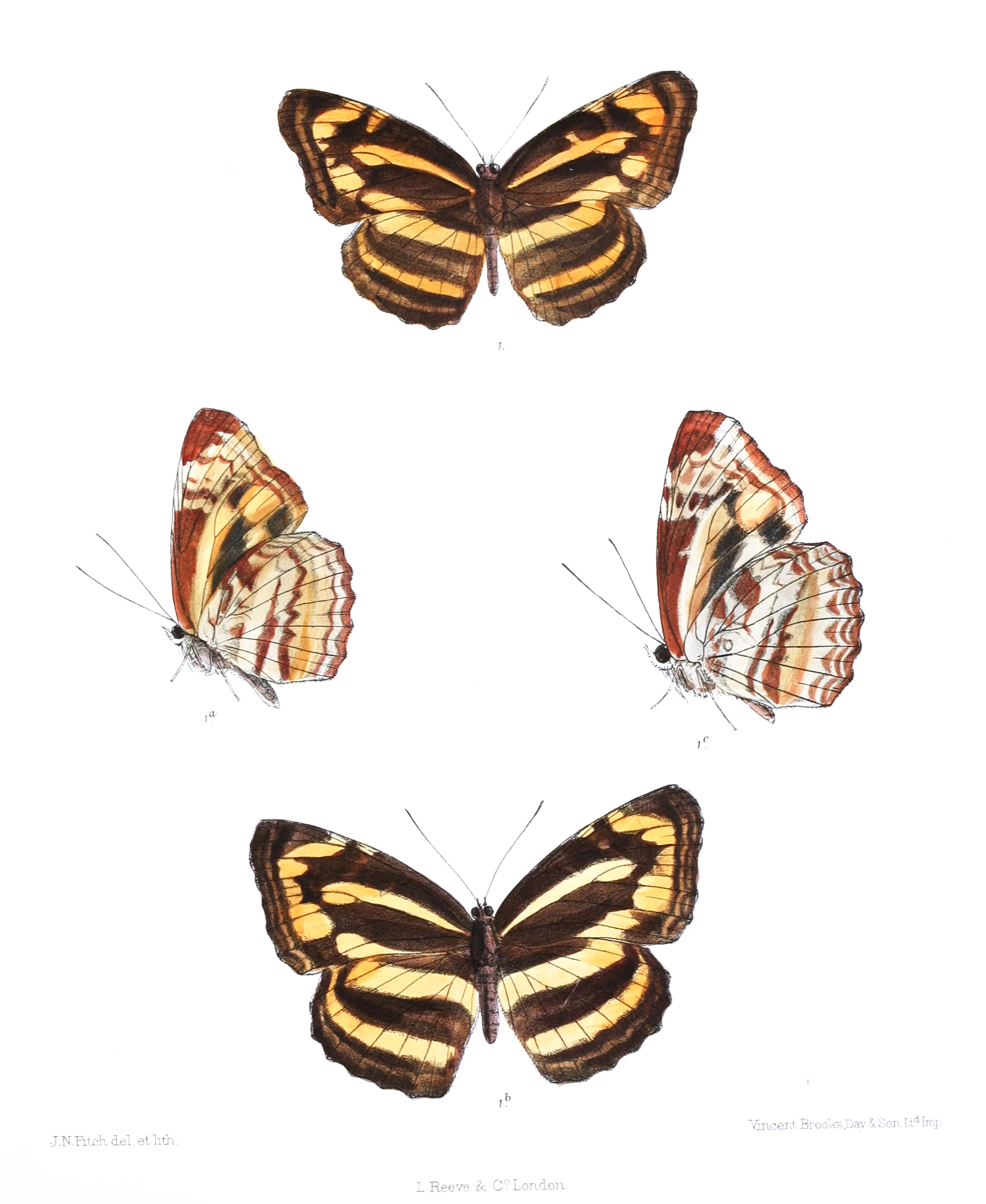

Scientific classification
- Domain: Eukaryota
- Kingdom: Animalia
- Phylum: Arthropoda
- Class: Insecta
- Order: Lepidoptera
- Family: Nymphalidae
- Genus: Neptis
- Species: N. radha

Binomial name
- Neptis radha Moore, 1857

Synonyms
- Neptis asterastilis Oberthür, 1891

= Neptis radha =

Species of butterfly

Neptis radha, the great yellow sailer, is a species of nymphalid butterfly found in Asia.

== Subspecies ==
- Neptis radha radha (north-eastern India to central Vietnam)
- Neptis radha asterastilis Oberthür, 1891 (Laos, north-eastern Burma)
- Neptis radha sinensis Oberthür, 1906 (western China (Szechwan))

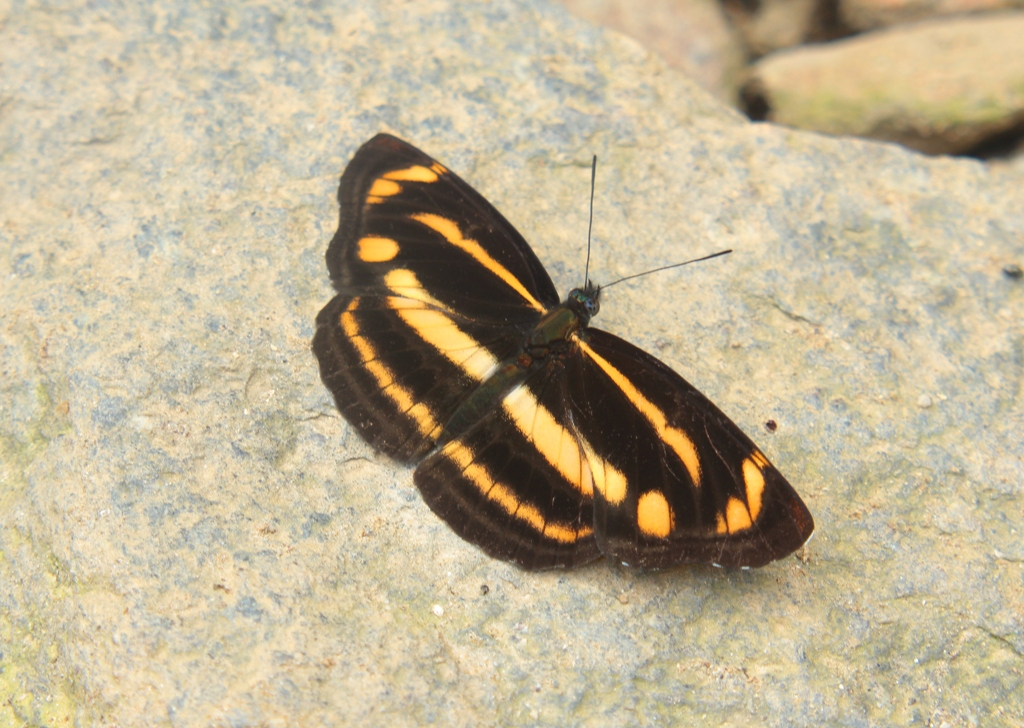

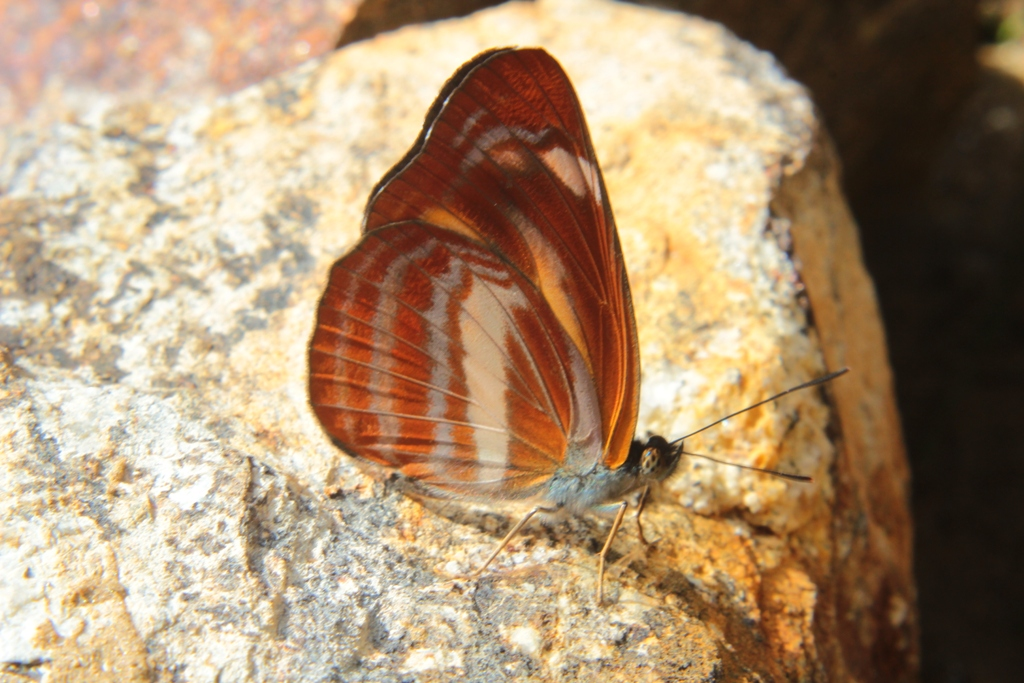
