= Neptis matilei =

Scientific classification
- Kingdom: Animalia
- Phylum: Arthropoda
- Class: Insecta
- Order: Lepidoptera
- Family: Nymphalidae
- Genus: Neptis
- Species: N. matilei

Binomial name
- Neptis matilei Pierre-Balthus, 2000

Species of butterfly

Neptis matilei is a butterfly in the family Nymphalidae. It is found in Gabon and Cameroon.
