= Neptis aurivillii =

Scientific classification
- Kingdom: Animalia
- Phylum: Arthropoda
- Class: Insecta
- Order: Lepidoptera
- Family: Nymphalidae
- Genus: Neptis
- Species: N. aurivillii

Binomial name
- Neptis aurivillii Schultze, 1913

Synonyms
- Neptis incongrua var. aurivillii Schultze, 1913

Species of butterfly

Neptis aurivillii is a butterfly in the family Nymphalidae. It is found in Kenya, Tanzania, Malawi and Zambia. The habitat consists of montane and sub-montane forests.

The larvae feed on Macaranga species and Urera hypselodendron.

It has been considered a subspecies of Neptis incongrua.Schultze described as a variety of incongura which it closely resembles.The Holotype is in the Natural History Museum, London.

== Subspecies ==
- Neptis aurivillii aurivillii (south-eastern Kenya, Tanzania, Malawi, Zambia)
- Neptis aurivillii ufipa Kielland, 1990 (Tanzania: west to the Ufipa district)
- Images BOLD
