= Neptis marci =

Scientific classification
- Kingdom: Animalia
- Phylum: Arthropoda
- Class: Insecta
- Order: Lepidoptera
- Family: Nymphalidae
- Genus: Neptis
- Species: N. marci

Binomial name
- Neptis marci Collins & Larsen, 1998

Species of butterfly

Neptis marci is a butterfly in the family Nymphalidae. It is found in the eastern part of the Democratic Republic of the Congo and possibly Rwanda. The habitat consists of montane forests.
