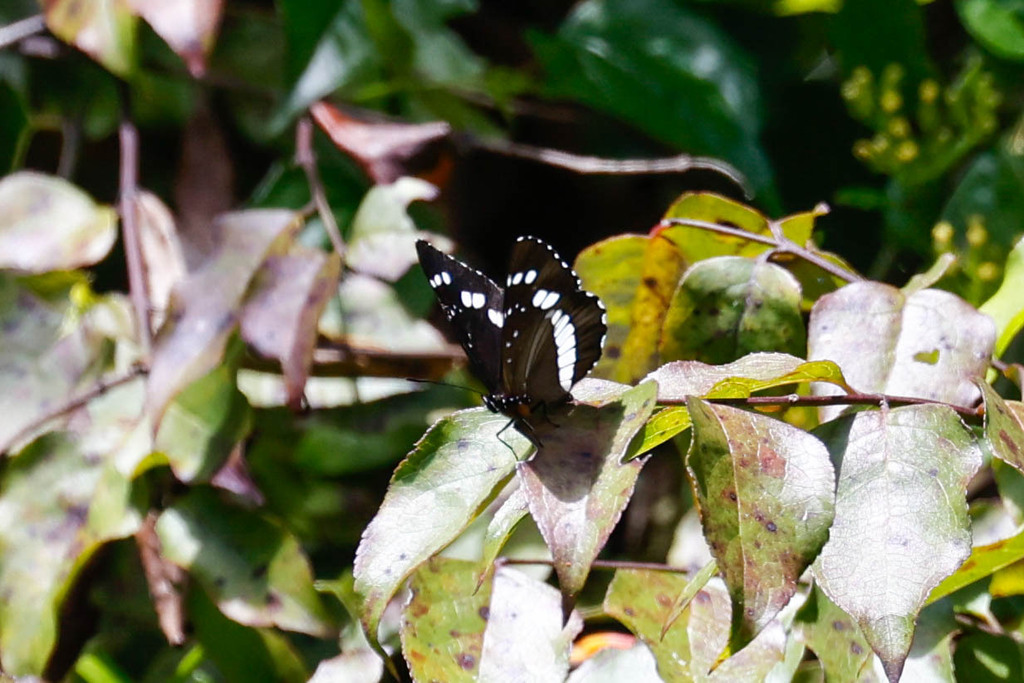

Scientific classification
- Kingdom: Animalia
- Phylum: Arthropoda
- Class: Insecta
- Order: Lepidoptera
- Family: Nymphalidae
- Genus: Neptis
- Species: N. occidentalis

Binomial name
- Neptis occidentalis Rothschild, 1918

Synonyms
- Neptis incongrus occidentalis Rothschild, 1918; Neptis incongrus batesii Hall, 1930

= Neptis occidentalis =

Species of butterfly

Neptis occidentalis, the mountain sailer, is a butterfly in the family Nymphalidae. It is found in Nigeria, Cameroon, the Democratic Republic of the Congo, Sudan, Uganda, Kenya and Tanzania. The habitat consists of montane and riparian forests.

== Subspecies ==
- Neptis occidentalis occidentalis (Democratic Republic of the Congo: Ituri and Kivu, southern Sudan, Uganda, Kenya, western Tanzania)
- Neptis occidentalis batesii Hall, 1930 (Nigeria, Cameroon)
