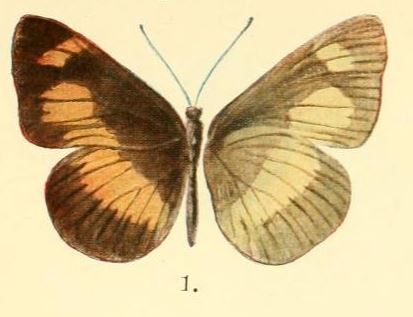

Scientific classification
- Kingdom: Animalia
- Phylum: Arthropoda
- Class: Insecta
- Order: Lepidoptera
- Family: Nymphalidae
- Genus: Neptis
- Species: N. exaleuca

Binomial name
- Neptis exaleuca Karsch, 1894

Synonyms
- Neptis exaleuca f. integra Eltringham, 1922

= Neptis exaleuca =

Species of butterfly

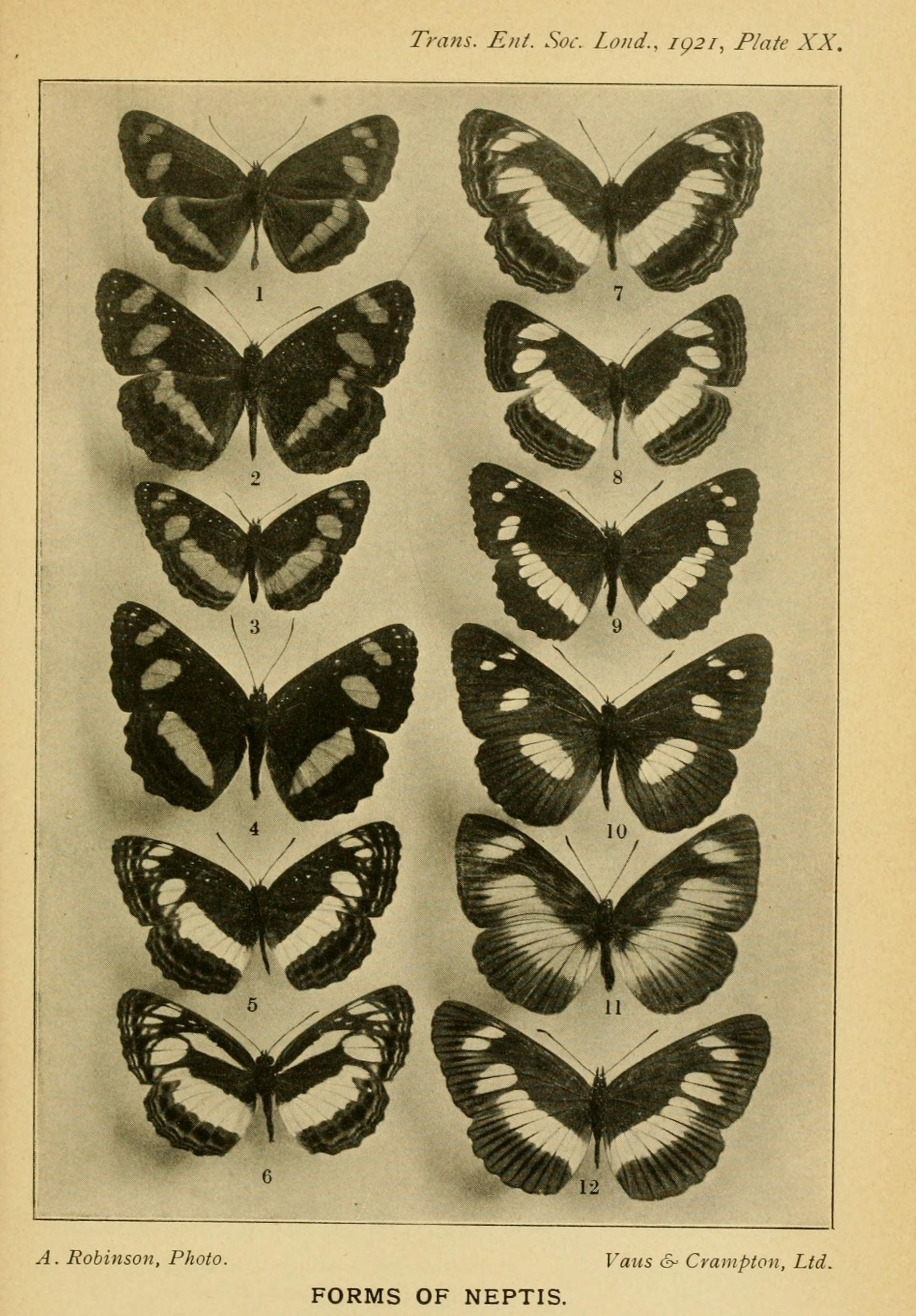
Figure 12

Neptis exaleuca is a butterfly in the family Nymphalidae. It is found from Cameroon to the Democratic Republic of the Congo and in Uganda and Tanzania.

== Description ==
Discal spots of the forewing and discal band of the hindwing white; Wings above dark brown, beneath glossy bronze-brown; fringes with white spots on the folds. Expanse 52 mm. Cameroons and Congo

== Subspecies ==
- Neptis exaleuca exaleuca (Cameroon to western Democratic Republic of the Congo)
- Neptis exaleuca suffusa Rothschild, 1918 (eastern Democratic Republic of the Congo, Uganda, north-western Tanzania)
