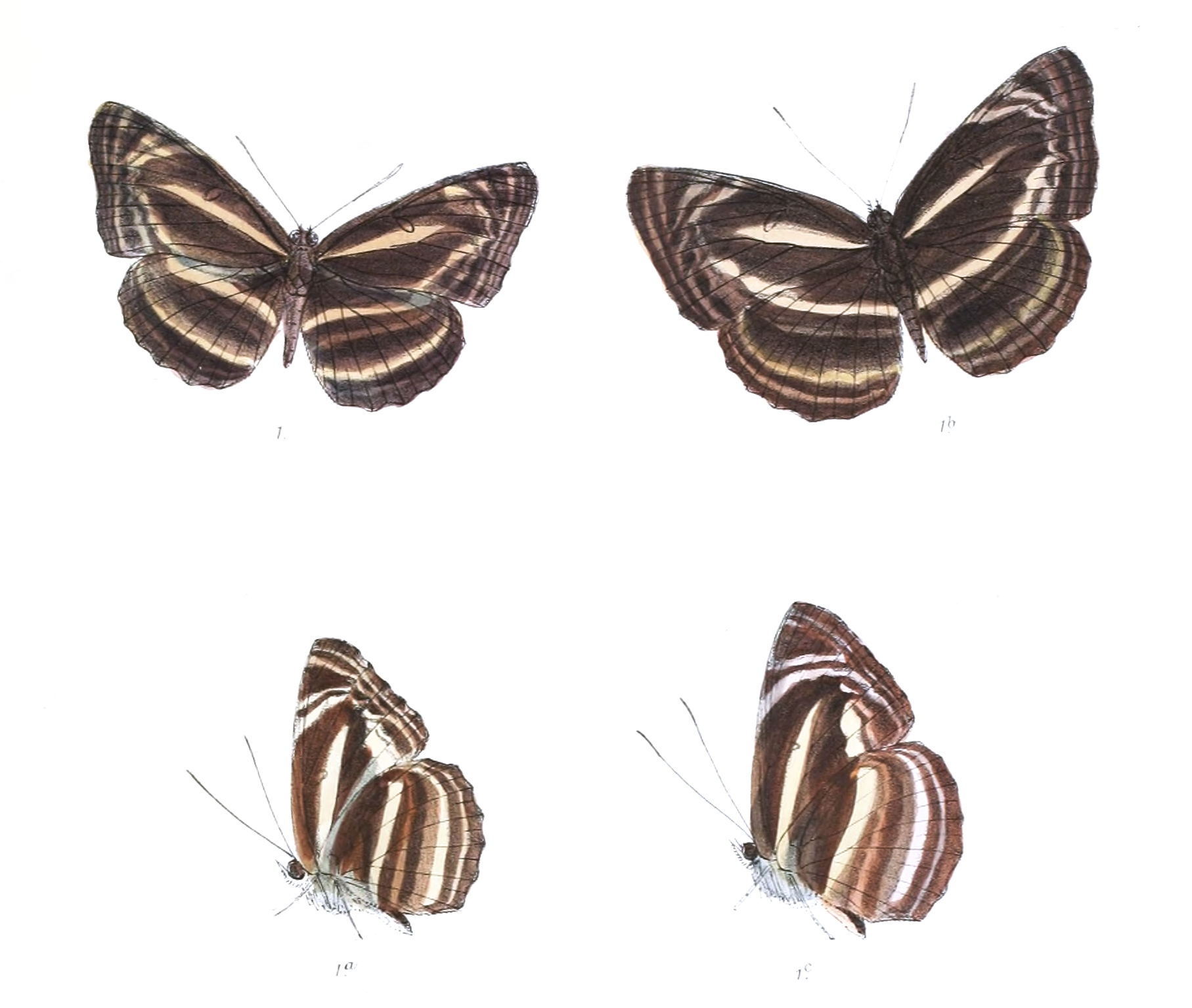
- Neptis vikasi pseudovikasi

Scientific classification
- Domain: Eukaryota
- Kingdom: Animalia
- Phylum: Arthropoda
- Class: Insecta
- Order: Lepidoptera
- Family: Nymphalidae
- Genus: Neptis
- Species: N. vikasi

Binomial name
- Neptis vikasi Horsfield, [1829]

= Neptis vikasi =

Species of butterfly

Neptis vikasi, the dingy sailer, is a species of nymphalid butterfly found in Asia, from north-eastern India to Burma and northern Indochina.
