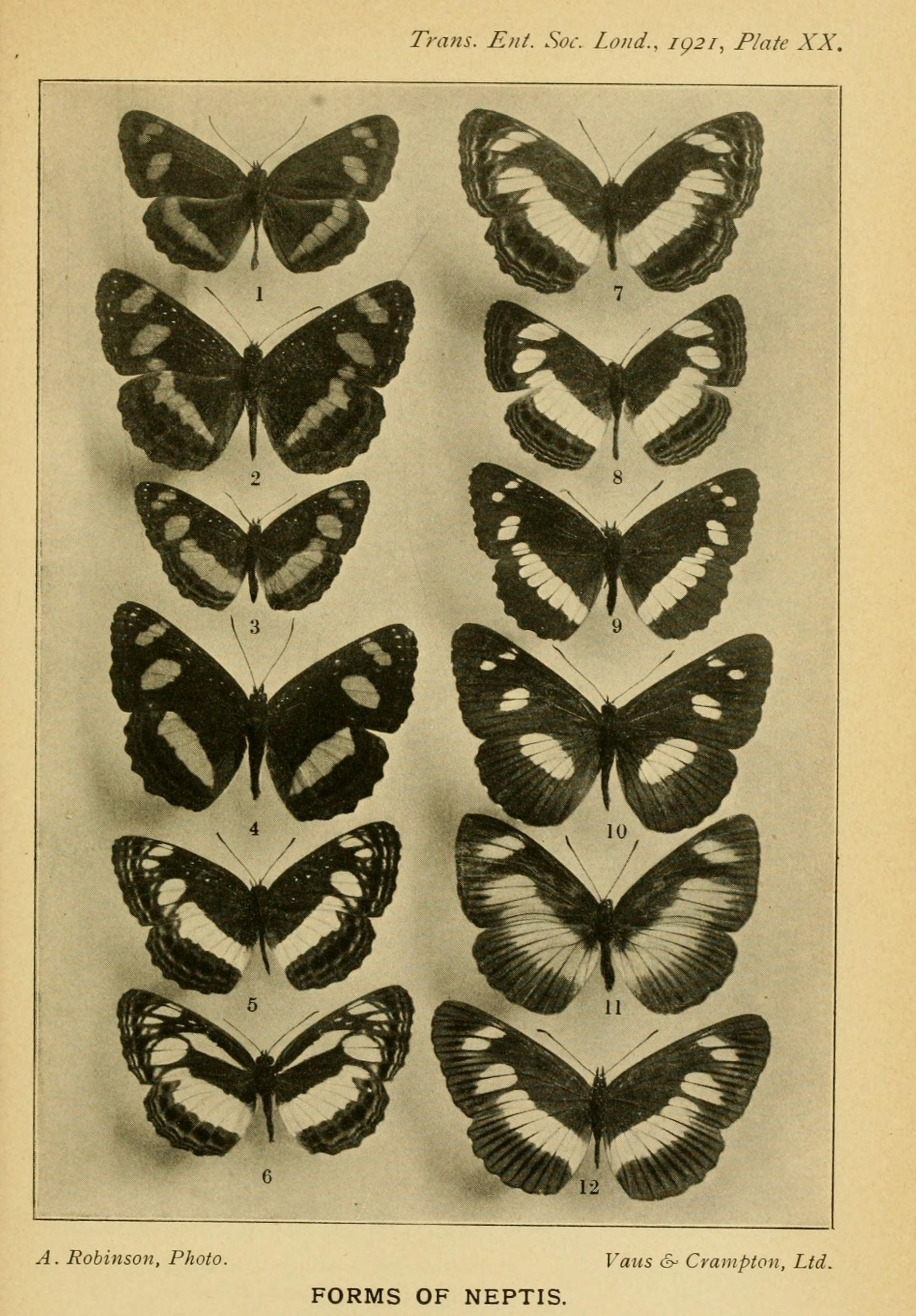
- Figure 11

Scientific classification
- Kingdom: Animalia
- Phylum: Arthropoda
- Class: Insecta
- Order: Lepidoptera
- Family: Nymphalidae
- Genus: Neptis
- Species: N. ochracea

Binomial name
- Neptis ochracea Neave, 1904

Synonyms
- Neptis mildbraedi Gaede, 1915; Neptis ochreata Gaede, 1915; Neptis ochracea parvimacula Rothschild, 1918; Neptis ochracea reducta Kielland, 1978; Neptis ochracea usungwa Kielland, 1985

= Neptis ochracea =

Species of butterfly

Neptis ochracea, the yellow mountain sailer, is a butterfly in the family Nymphalidae. It is found in Nigeria, Cameroon, the Democratic Republic of the Congo, Uganda, Rwanda, Burundi and Tanzania. The habitat consists of montane forests.

The larvae feed on Rubus species.

== Subspecies ==
- Neptis ochracea ochracea (Democratic Republic of the Congo: Ituri, western and central Uganda, north-western Tanzania)
- Neptis ochracea lualabae Berger, 1981 (Democratic Republic of the Congo: Lualaba)
- Neptis ochracea mildbraedi Gaede, 1915 (Nigeria, Cameroon)
- Neptis ochracea ochreata Gaede, 1915 (Democratic Republic of the Congo: Kivu, western Uganda)
- Neptis ochracea reductata Larsen, 1995 (western Tanzania)
- Neptis ochracea uluguru Kielland, 1985 (eastern Tanzania)
