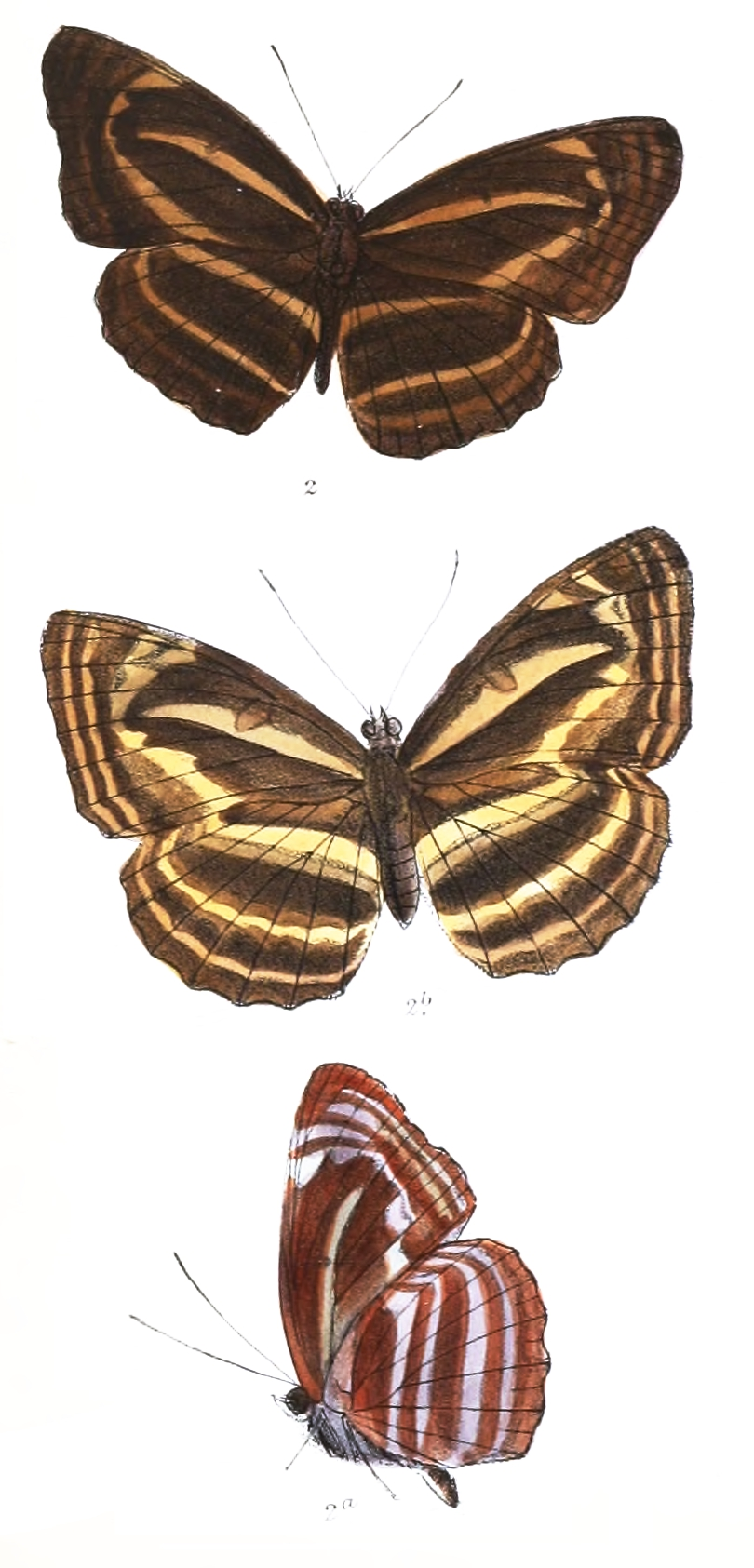

Scientific classification
- Kingdom: Animalia
- Phylum: Arthropoda
- Clade: Pancrustacea
- Class: Insecta
- Order: Lepidoptera
- Family: Nymphalidae
- Genus: Neptis
- Species: N. anjana

Binomial name
- Neptis anjana Moore, 1881

Synonyms
- Neptis hyria Fruhstorfer, 1913; Neptis vidua Staudinger, 1889

= Neptis anjana =

Species of butterfly

Neptis anjana, the rich sailer, is a species of nymphalid butterfly found in Asia.It is deep brown with dark steel-blue bands of a purplish lustre.

== Subspecies ==
- Neptis anjana anjana (central and southern Burma)
- Neptis anjana hyria Fruhstorfer, 1913 (Peninsular Malaya, Sumatra) The submarginal bands on the upper surface of the hindwing are less distinct than in anjana, the under surface more vivid red-brown, the steel-blue bands narrower and darker.
- Neptis anjana decerna Fruhstorfer, 1908 (south-eastern Borneo) distinguished by very narrow grey-brown stripes on the upper surface
- Neptis anjana elegantia Fruhstorfer, 1908 (northern Borneo) has the bands broader, more yellowish, and on the under surface more intensely violet.
- Neptis anjana zena Fruhstorfer, 1905 (Java) a paler form having the discoidal streak as well as the subapical and subanal bands on forewing pale yellowish-brown instead of dark-brown, and the transverse bands rather lighter on hindwing. Still more striking is the pale colouring of the under surface, the ground-colour being light red instead of dark blue. All spots and other markings are broader and paler than they appear and of a more yellowish-white tone. Even the blue-violet bands on the hindwing are less dark and more brilliant.
- Neptis anjana saskia Fruhstorfer, 1900 (Nias) has on the forewing the subapical spots much larger than in zena, and clear white instead of yellowish; moreover, the upper one of the three spots composing the subanal transverse band assumes a whitish tinge.On the hindwing the subbasal band is somewhat narrower and paler than in zena, and the inner (postdiscal) submarginal band is made up of broader, rather helmet-shaped than oblong spots, between which we notice along the veins rays extending from the broad, jet-black discal spot. Beneath it even surpasses zena in the extent of the white patches and bands on the forewing. On the hindwing the under surface is characterized by the white subbasal band (which in zena and anjana remains of equal width) strongly tapering anally and being succeeded by a deeply dentate violet band; the inner, pale submarginal band is more conspicuous, broader and more strongly undulate than in zena, and is margined below by a much broader red-brown band than in vidua, any other form of anjana,
- Neptis anjana vidua Staudinger, 1889 (the Philippines (Palawan)is an exceedingly rare subspecies, only 1 male being known. Above black with a broad white band on hindwing and a similar but much broken macular band on forewing. The latter moreover with an obsolete, brownish transverse line before the terminal margin, contrasting with the very distinct, although narrow band on hindwing. Under surface of hindwing with three narrow, nearly parallel, violet-grey bands. Palawan, collected by Dr. Platen.
