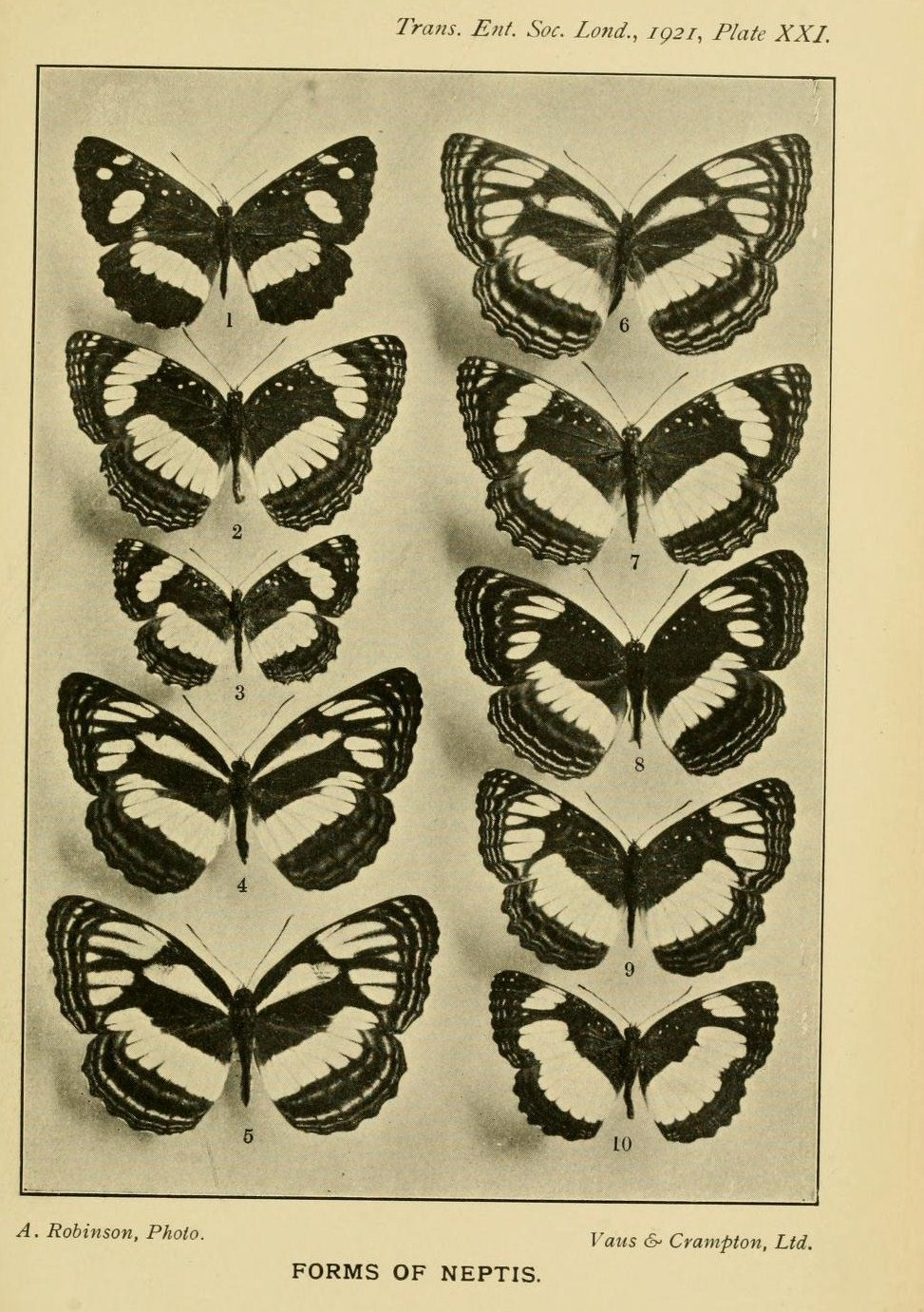
- Figure 10

Scientific classification
- Kingdom: Animalia
- Phylum: Arthropoda
- Class: Insecta
- Order: Lepidoptera
- Family: Nymphalidae
- Genus: Neptis
- Species: N. kikideli

Binomial name
- Neptis kikideli Boisduval, 1833

= Neptis kikideli =

Species of butterfly

Neptis kikideli is a butterfly in the family Nymphalidae. It is found on Madagascar. The habitat consists of forests.

The underside of the hindwing has 2 or 3 continuous white transverse bands at the base and the cell has white dots or is only striped with white at the anterior margin. Discal spots 1 b and 2 broadly joined together, forming a broad white half-band between the hindmargin and vein 4; discal spot 4 is absent or quite small; the median band of the hindwing is 8—10 mm. in breadth. Madagascar
