= Neptis kikuyuensis =

Scientific classification
- Kingdom: Animalia
- Phylum: Arthropoda
- Clade: Pancrustacea
- Class: Insecta
- Order: Lepidoptera
- Family: Nymphalidae
- Genus: Neptis
- Species: N. kikuyuensis

Binomial name
- Neptis kikuyuensis Jackson, 1951

Species of butterfly

Neptis kikuyuensis is a butterfly in the family Nymphalidae. It is found in Kenya (the Kikuyu Escarpment and the Aberdare Range) and Tanzania. The habitat consists of montane forests.
