= Harry Eltringham =

English histologist and entomologist

Harry Eltringham FRS
- Born: 18 May 1873
- Died: 26 November 1941 (aged 68)
- Scientific career
- Fields: histology; entomology

Harry Eltringham FRS (18 May 1873, South Shields – 26 November 1941, Stroud) was an English histologist and entomologist who specialised in Lepidoptera.

== Life ==
He had been awarded a Master of Science (Cantab and Oxon) and a Doctor of Science (Oxon).

He worked at the Hope Department of Entomology. He wrote Histological and Illustrative Methods for Entomologists OCLC 03655743, The Senses of Insects, London, Methuen (1933) and on Lepidoptera Nymphalidae: Subfamily Acraeinae. Lepidopterorum Catalogus 11:1-65 with Karl Jordan (1913) and On specific and mimetic relationships in the genus Heliconius.

Eltringham was the author of a photograph of Edward Bagnall Poulton taken through the compound eye of a glowworm.

He was an elected a Fellow of the Zoological Society of London (FZS) from 1903, and of the Royal Entomological Society (President 1931-32) and in May 1930 the Royal Society.
