= Australina =

Australina may refer to:

- Australina (brachiopod), a fossil genus of brachiopods in the family Lissatrypidae
- Australina (plant), a genus of flowering plants in the family Urticaceae
- Australina, a genus of flies in the family Lauxaniidae; synonym of Australinina
