= Mnesictena marmarina =

Scientific classification
- Kingdom: Animalia
- Phylum: Arthropoda
- Clade: Pancrustacea
- Class: Insecta
- Order: Lepidoptera
- Family: Crambidae
- Genus: Mnesictena
- Species: M. marmarina

Binomial name
- Mnesictena marmarina Meyrick, 1884

Synonyms
- Mecyna marmarina (Meyrick, 1884); Udea marmarina (Meyrick, 1884)

Species of moth endemic to New Zealand

Mnesictena marmarina, also known as the brown nettle moth or the dusky nettle triangle, is a snout moth of the family Crambidae. It was first described by Edward Meyrick in 1884. It is endemic to New Zealand and is found throughout the country including in the Chatham Islands. M. marmarina frequents habitat where its larval hosts are common. The larvae live during the New Zealand spring and early summer and feed on nettles in the genus Urtica, including Urtica ferox and Urtica incisa, as well as on Australina pusilla and Elatostema rugosum. They join two or three leaves together with silken threads and then feed and pupate within this structure. Adults are on the wing most months of the year and are attracted to light. They are similar in appearance to Mnesictena flavidalis but can be distinguished as M. marmarina is larger in size and has a clear white spot on its forewings.

== Taxonomy ==
This species was first described by Edward Meyrick in 1884 and originally named Mnesictena marmarina. In 1902 Meyrick placed this species in the genus Mecyna. In 1913 Meyrick confirmed that placement. George Hudson, following Meyrick, discussed and illustrated this species under the name Mecyna marmarina in his 1928 book The butterflies and moths of New Zealand. In 1983 Eugene G. Munroe synonymised the genus Mnesictena with Udea. Thus this species has also been known under the name Udea marmarina. In 1988 John S. Dugdale treated Mnesictena as a valid genus and discussed this moth under the name Mnesictena marmarina. Dugdale's treatment was followed in 2011 by Richard Mally and Matthias Nuss. The male lectotype, collected in Palmerston North by Meyrick, is held at the Natural History Museum, London.

== Description ==
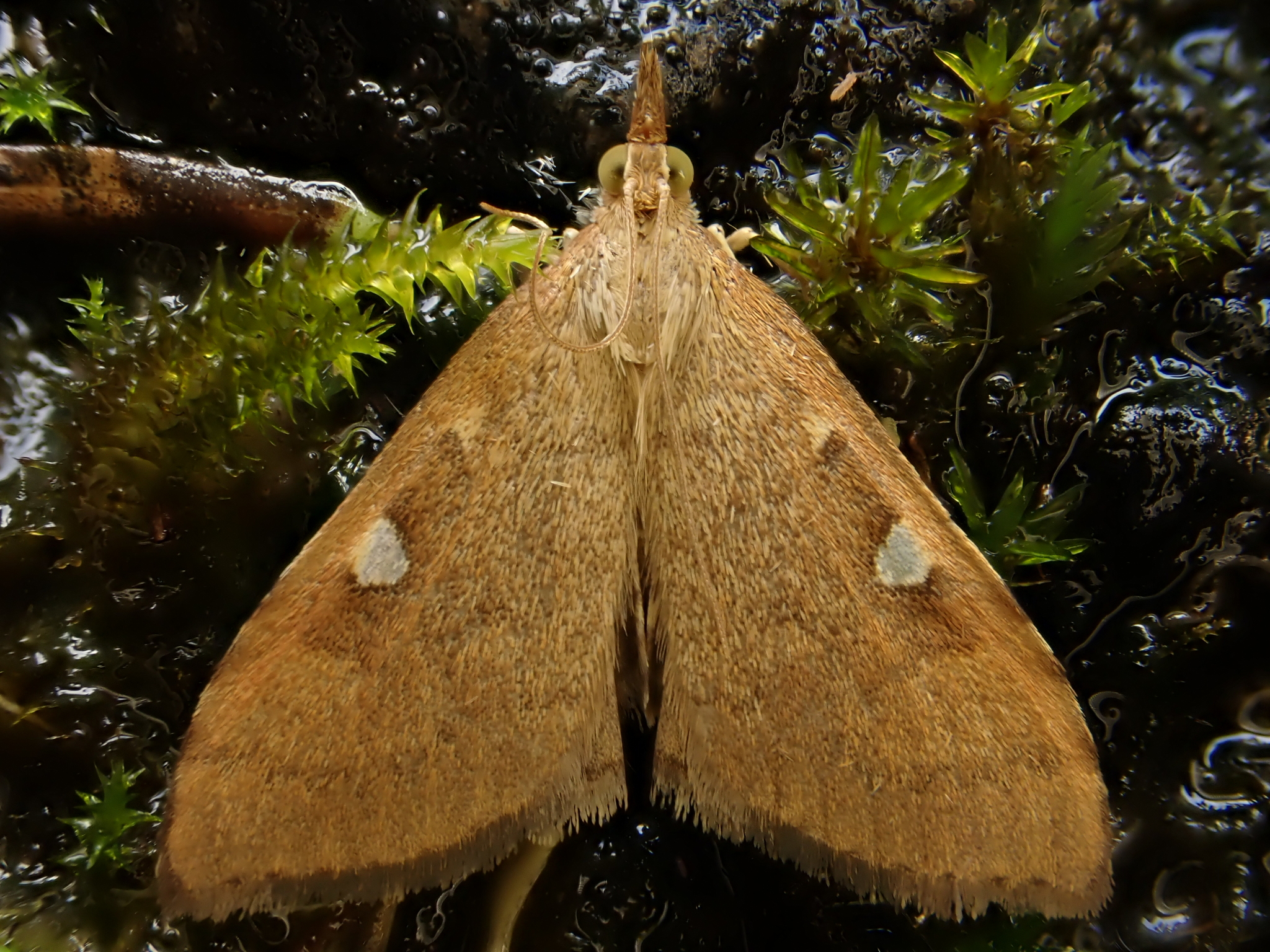
Live moth at rest.

Meyrick originally described this species as follows:

♂♀. 20—28 mm. Head, palpi, antennae, and thorax varying from ochreous to grey; palpi externally suffused with dark grey, beneath white. Abdomen varying from yellowish to grey. Legs ochreous-whitish, anterior pair suffused with grey. Fore wings broadly triangular, costa moderately arched on posterior half, apex obtuse, hind margin obliquely rounded ; yellowish ochreous, irrorated with grey, sometimes wholly suffused with grey; lines slightly dentate, dark grey; first from one-fifth of costa to one-third of inner margin, obtusely bent in disc; second from four-fifths of costa to three-fourths of inner margin, externally margined with paler, between two-thirds and four-fifths strongly curved inwards to beneath discal spot; a tolerably round white spot in disc above middle, preceded and followed by subquadrate darker grey shades; apical half of costa pale, with four dark grey spots; a row of minute dark grey dots on hind margin ; cilia grey, tips ochreous-whitish. Hind wings yellowish, irrorated with grey, sometimes mostly suffused with pale grey; two small round dark fuscous spots placed one obliquely above and before the other in disc; a dark grey line at three-fourths, sinuate inwards beneath costa, and sending a curve inwards beneath discal spot ; a grey hind marginal band, obsolete towards anal angle, broader and darker at apex; hind marginal dots and cilia as in fore wings.

M. marmarina is similar in appearance to Mnesictena flavidalis but is distinguished by being larger in size and having a clear white spot on its forewings.

Illustration of larva by Hudson.

Hudson described the larva of M. marmarina as follows:

... it has a glassy appearance. Its general colour is dull white, becoming greenish on the dorsal surface. There is a strong clear white sub-dorsal line, and a fainter white lateral line. The head is pale ochreous with a very conspicuous broad brown blotch on each side as well as a few dots of the same colour. The larva is armed with a few black bristles. Its length when full-grown is about 1/2 inch.

In 1939 Hudson again discussed and illustrated the larva and stated that when fully stretched the length was 7/8 inch. The larva can be recognised by the almost black blotch on each side of head as well as a similar, but rather smaller, blotch present on each side of segment 2.

== Distribution ==
This species is endemic to New Zealand. It is found throughout the country including in the Chatham Islands.

== Habitat and hosts ==
M. marmarina frequents habitat where its larval hosts are found. Larvae feed on nettles in the genus Urtica, including Urtica ferox and Urtica incisa, as well as on Australina pusilla and Elatostema rugosum.

== Life cycle and behaviour ==
Larvae live during the New Zealand spring and early summer. They join two or three leaves together with silken threads and then feed from within this structure. They pupate within the joined leaves and remain in this stage for approximately a month. Adults are on the wing most months of the year but are most commonly observed during October to March. They are attracted to light. David E. Gaskin hypothesised that this species passes winter as a caterpillar and that there are two broods in a year based on the pupal stage lasting a month and the adults being common both in early summer and autumn.
