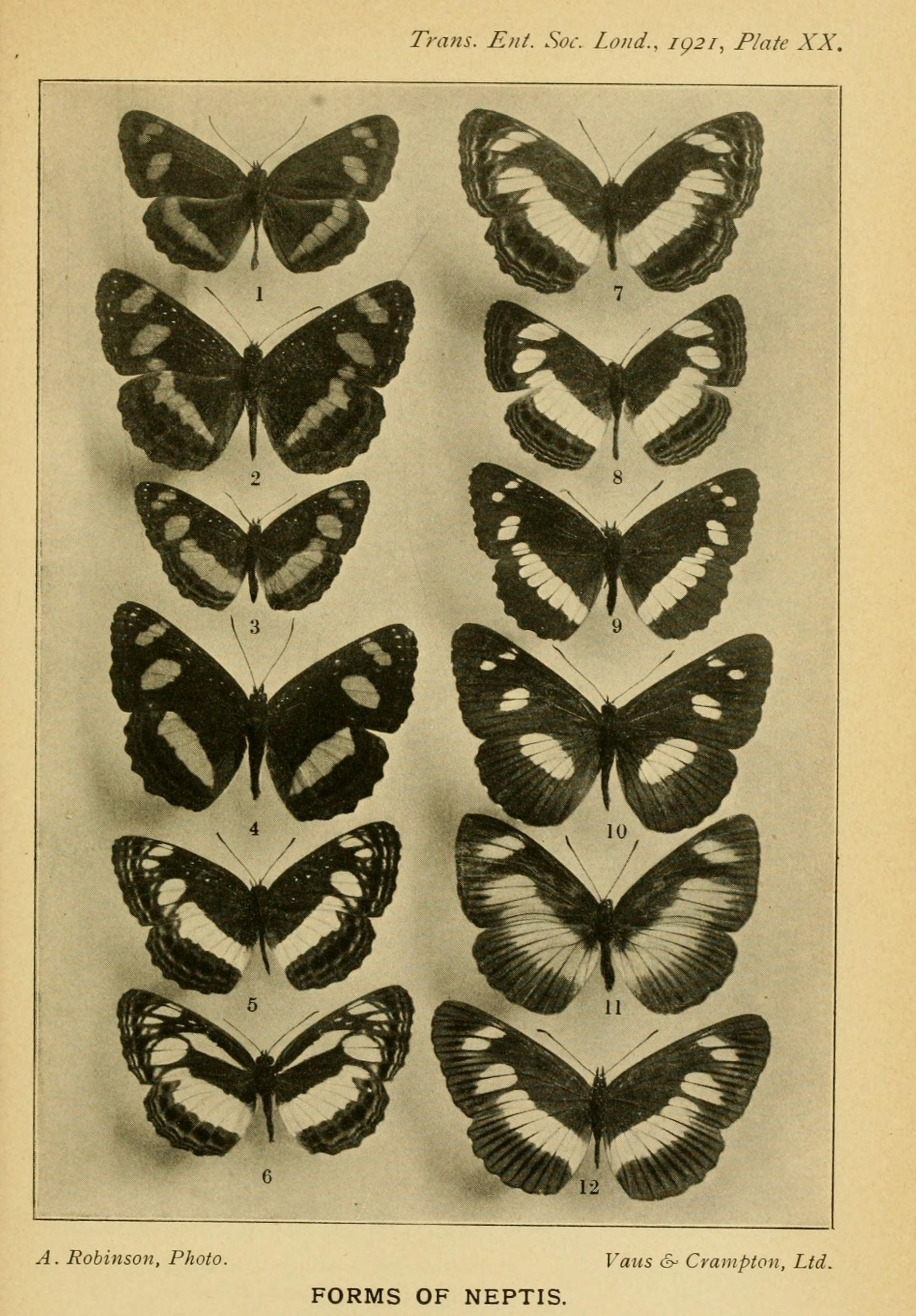
- Figure 2

Scientific classification
- Kingdom: Animalia
- Phylum: Arthropoda
- Class: Insecta
- Order: Lepidoptera
- Family: Nymphalidae
- Genus: Neptis
- Species: N. dumetorum

Binomial name
- Neptis dumetorum (Boisduval, 1833)

Synonyms
- Limenitis dumetorum Boisduval, 1833

= Neptis dumetorum =

Species of butterfly

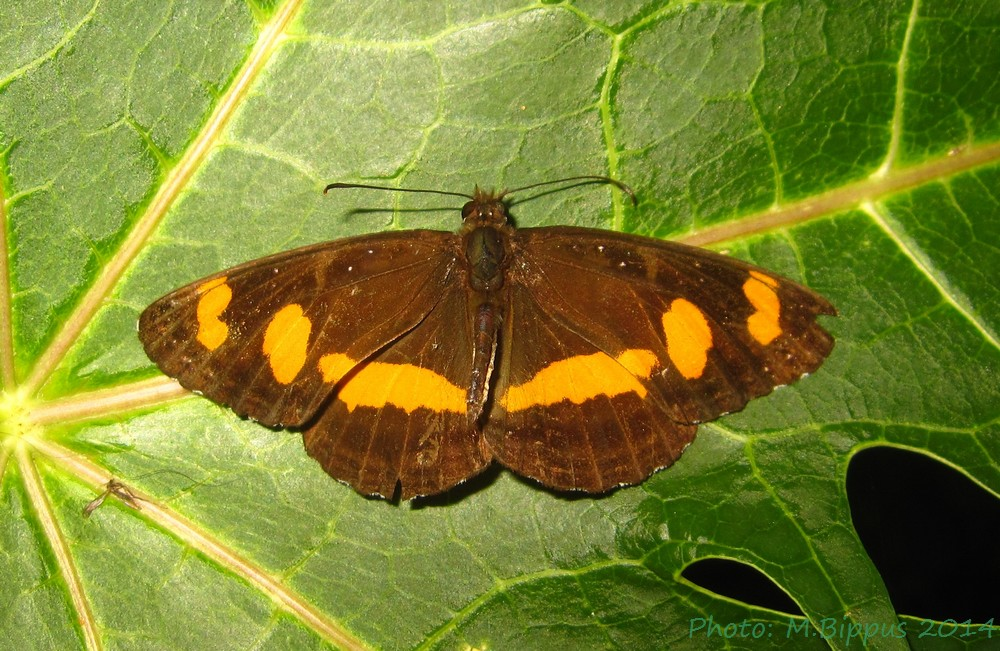

Neptis dumetorum is a butterfly in the family Nymphalidae. It is found on Réunion in the Indian Ocean. It is a member of the frobenia group of Neptis. The species of this small group are confined to the Mascarene and Comoro Islands and do not seem to occur on Madagascar, but closely approximate to Neptis saclava, which is found there. They are distinguished by the yellow markings of the upper surface from all the other species except two of the last group [exaleuca group] . The discal band of the forewing is twice interrupted, in cellules 1 b and 4, and discal spot 4 is absent or small and joined to the spot in 3. In the males the underside of the forewing at the hindmargin is grey with a strong mother-of-pearl gloss as far as vein 2.

- Neptis frobenia F. (48 c). The median band of both wings is placed beyond the middle and on both surfaces the wings are unicolorous without markings as far as the transverse band. The transverse band of the forewing is divided into three groups of spots, consisting of a very small hindmarginal spot in 1 a and 1 b, a middle division in 2 and 3 and a subapical band in 5—-8. Mauritius.
- Neptis dumetorum Bdv. is very similar to the preceding species, but the cell of the forewing has above white, beneath yellowish dots and the transverse band is placed further from the distal margin and beneath, at least on the hindwing, is white. Island of Bourbon; common especially in the damper and more wooded parts of the island.
- Neptis mayottensis Oberth. (48 c), like the preceding species, has light dots in the cell of the forewing; the discal band is light yellow above, yellowish white beneath and on the hindwing broader than in the two pre¬ceding species; the hindwing beneath at the base chequered with brown and grey. Island of Mayotte.
- Neptis comorarum Oberth. (48 c) differs from the others in having the yellow hindmarginal spot of the fore wing entirely absent, otherwise agrees almost exactly with mayottensis, but is somewhat larger. Island of Grand Comoro.

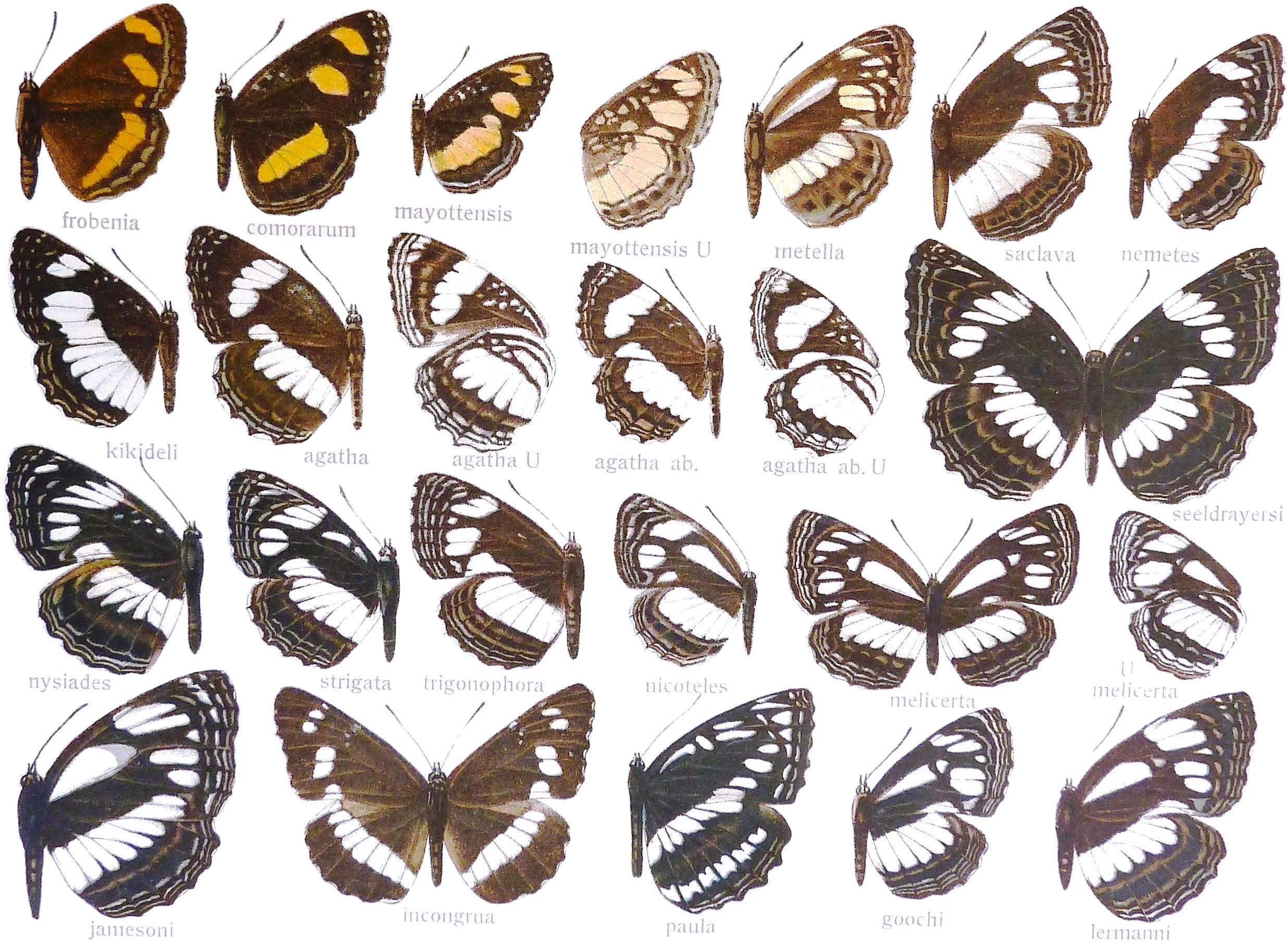
Seitz FaunaAfricana XII Taf48

== Host plants ==
Known host plants of this butterfly are: Acalypha wilkesiana, Trochetia granulata, Sida carpinifolia (Malvaceae) and Acalypha integrifolia (Euphorbiaceae).
