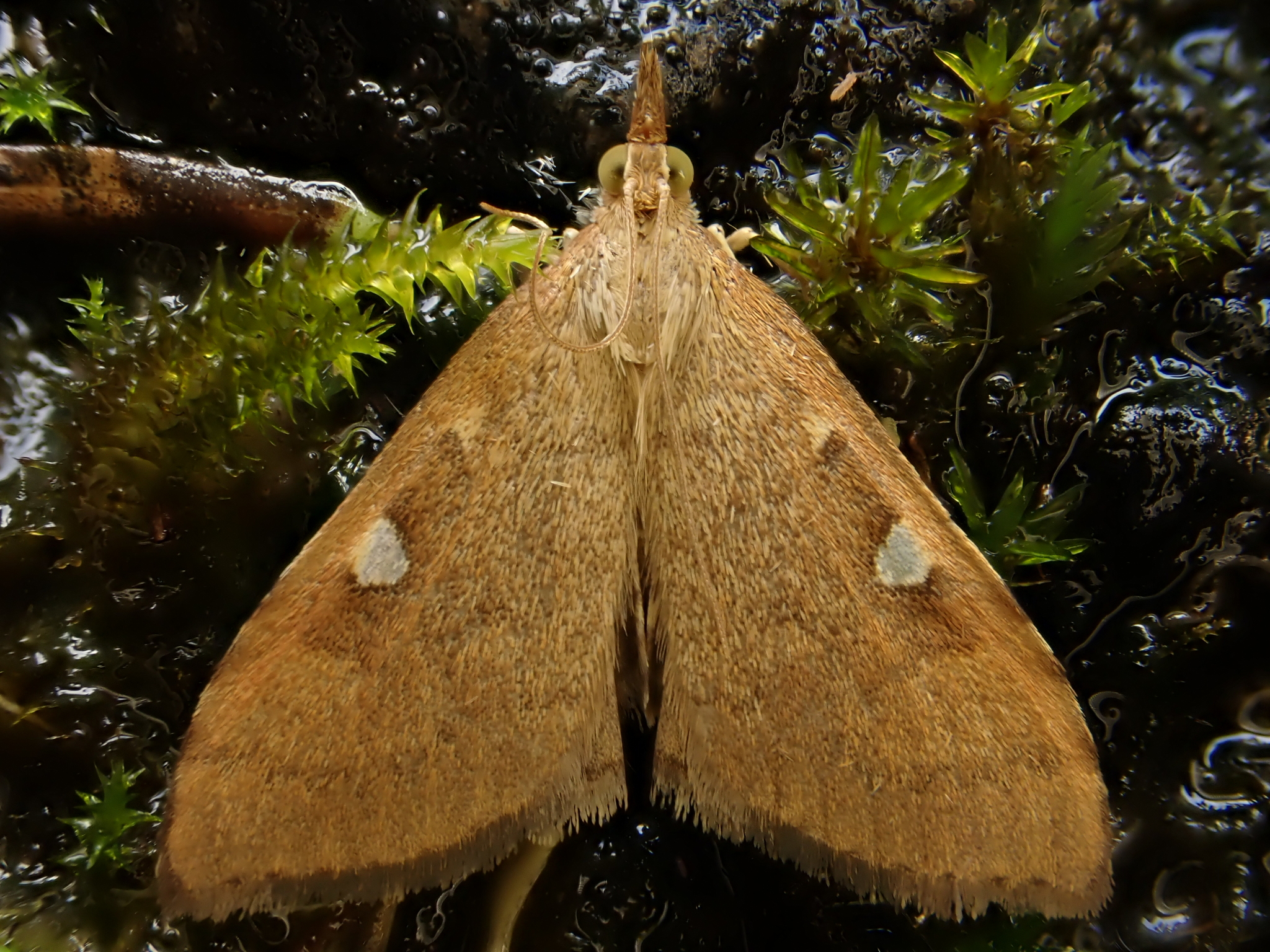
- Mnesictena marmarina

Scientific classification
- Kingdom: Animalia
- Phylum: Arthropoda
- Class: Insecta
- Order: Lepidoptera
- Family: Crambidae
- Tribe: Udeini
- Genus: Mnesictena; Meyrick, 1884

= Mnesictena =

Genus of moths

Mnesictena is a genus of snout moths in the subfamily Spilomelinae, where it is placed in the tribe Udeini. The genus was erected by the English entomologist Edward Meyrick in 1884. The currently known seven species are exclusively found on New Zealand and the associated Antipodes Islands and Chatham Islands.

In the past, Mnesictena was included in the genus Udea, but it is currently considered a separate genus.

The caterpillars feed on different plants, with Mnesictena flavidalis being recorded from Muehlenbeckia (Polygonaceae), M. daiclesalis from Veronica macrocarpa (Plantaginaceae), and M. notata as well as M. marmarina from Urtica, the latter also from Australina.

== Species ==
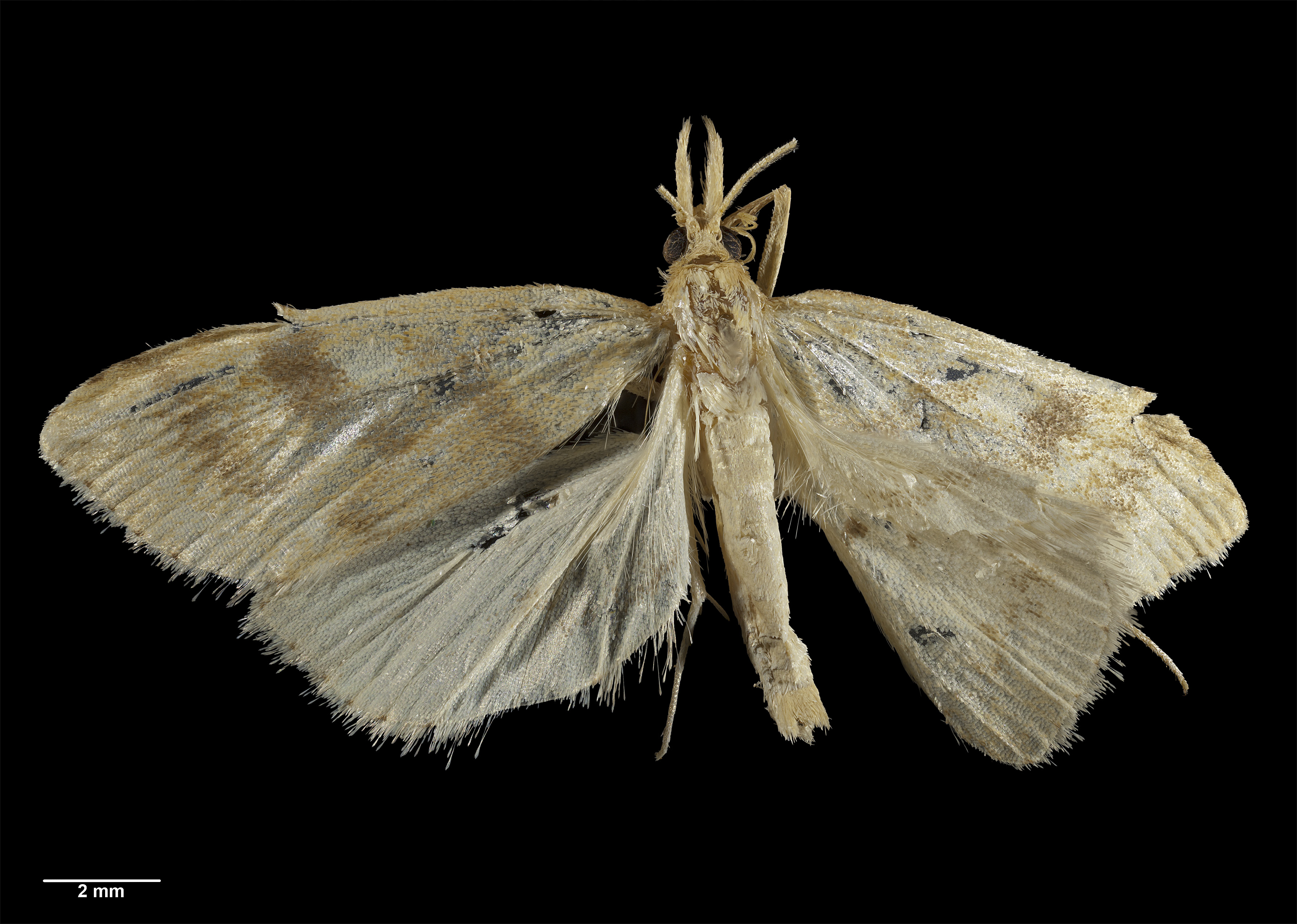
Mnesictena antipodea, adult, holotype specimen

- Mnesictena adversa (Philpott, 1917), distributed on New Zealand
- Mnesictena antipodea (Salmon in Salmon & Bradley, 1956), distributed on the SE Antipodes Island
- Mnesictena daiclesalis (Walker, 1859), distributed on New Zealand
- Mnesictena flavidalis (Doubleday, 1843), distributed on New Zealand
- Mnesictena marmarina Meyrick, 1884, distributed on New Zealand; type species of the genus
- Mnesictena notata (Butler, 1879), distributed on New Zealand
- Mnesictena pantheropa (Meyrick, 1884), distributed on the Chatham Islsnds
