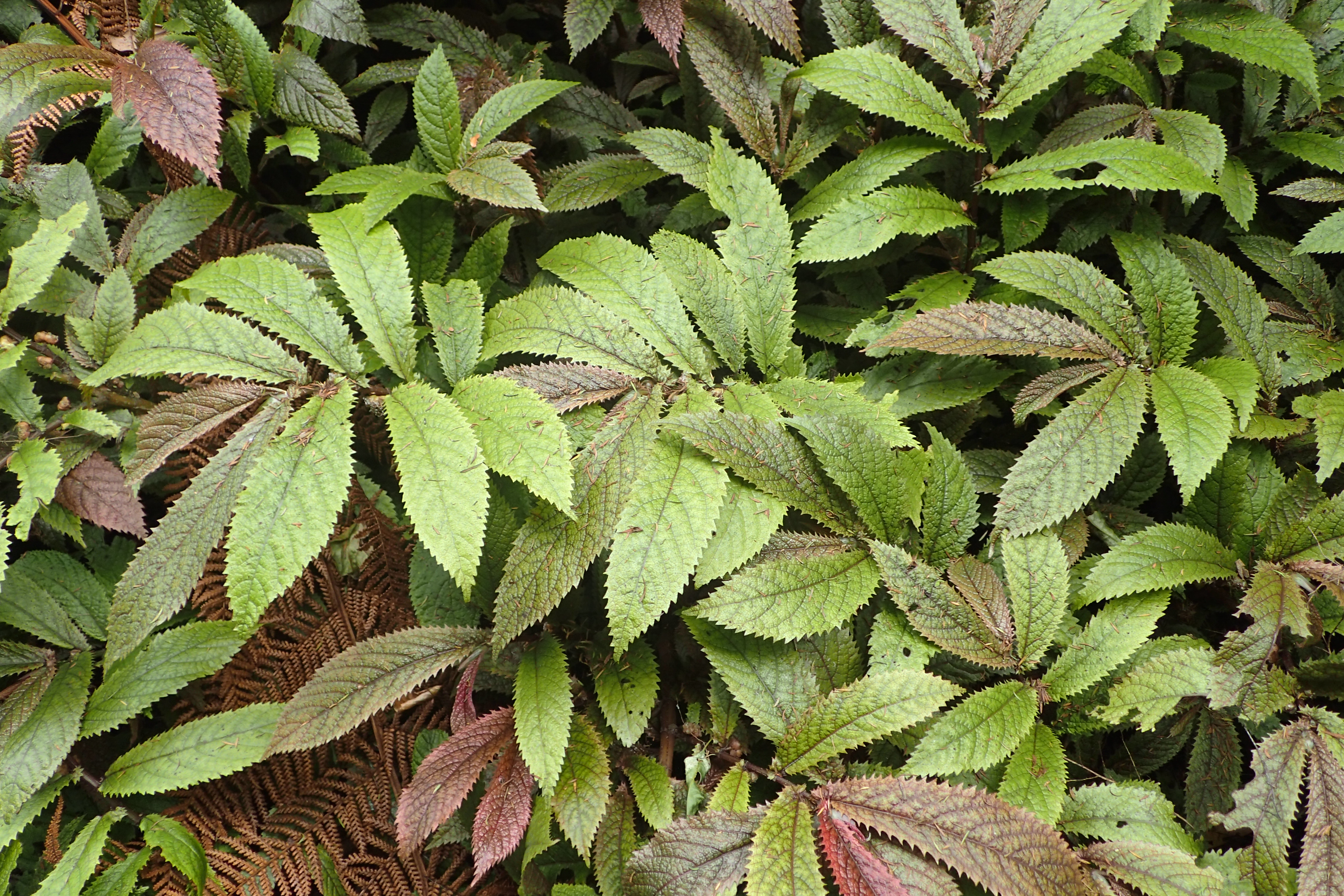

Scientific classification
- Kingdom: Plantae
- Clade: Tracheophytes
- Clade: Angiosperms
- Clade: Eudicots
- Clade: Rosids
- Order: Rosales
- Family: Urticaceae
- Genus: Elatostema
- Species: E. rugosum

Binomial name
- Elatostema rugosum A.Cunn.

= Elatostema rugosum =

Species of flowering plant

Elatostema rugosum is an herbaceous dicot that is considered to be a groundcover. It is commonly called parataniwha, paratāniwhaniwha, New Zealand begonia, and begonia fern. It tends to grow in large masses. Although it has hairs and is in the nettle family, it does not possess any stinging hairs.

== Identification ==
=== Species description ===
Its leaves, categorised as having mesophylls, can range from reddish (the colour of many of its young leaves due to anthocyanins), to purple and green when they mature. They are also described as bronze. They are 8–25 cm in length and 2.5–6 cm wide, significantly toothed, and wider on one side of the midrib. They lack stalks, have dark veins, and tend to bend toward their narrower edge. The leaves have a wrinkly look, consistent with the name rugosum from the Latin word “ruga” which means “wrinkle.” They are pinnate and alternate, often grow in a single plane, and tend to be very close to the ground (around the height of someone’s ankle), but are also commonly knee high, and can even be higher as the stems can reach a meter tall. Although unrelated to both begonias and ferns, Elatostema rugosum gained the common name begonia fern from Europeans due to its appearance. The stems are juicy, bend at the top, have a woody base, and spread over the ground to root.

Consistent with many native forest plants of Aotearoa due to the nature of native pollinators, this plant does not have large, colourful flowers. Its flowers are small masses, protected by a membrane, at the base of the leaves.

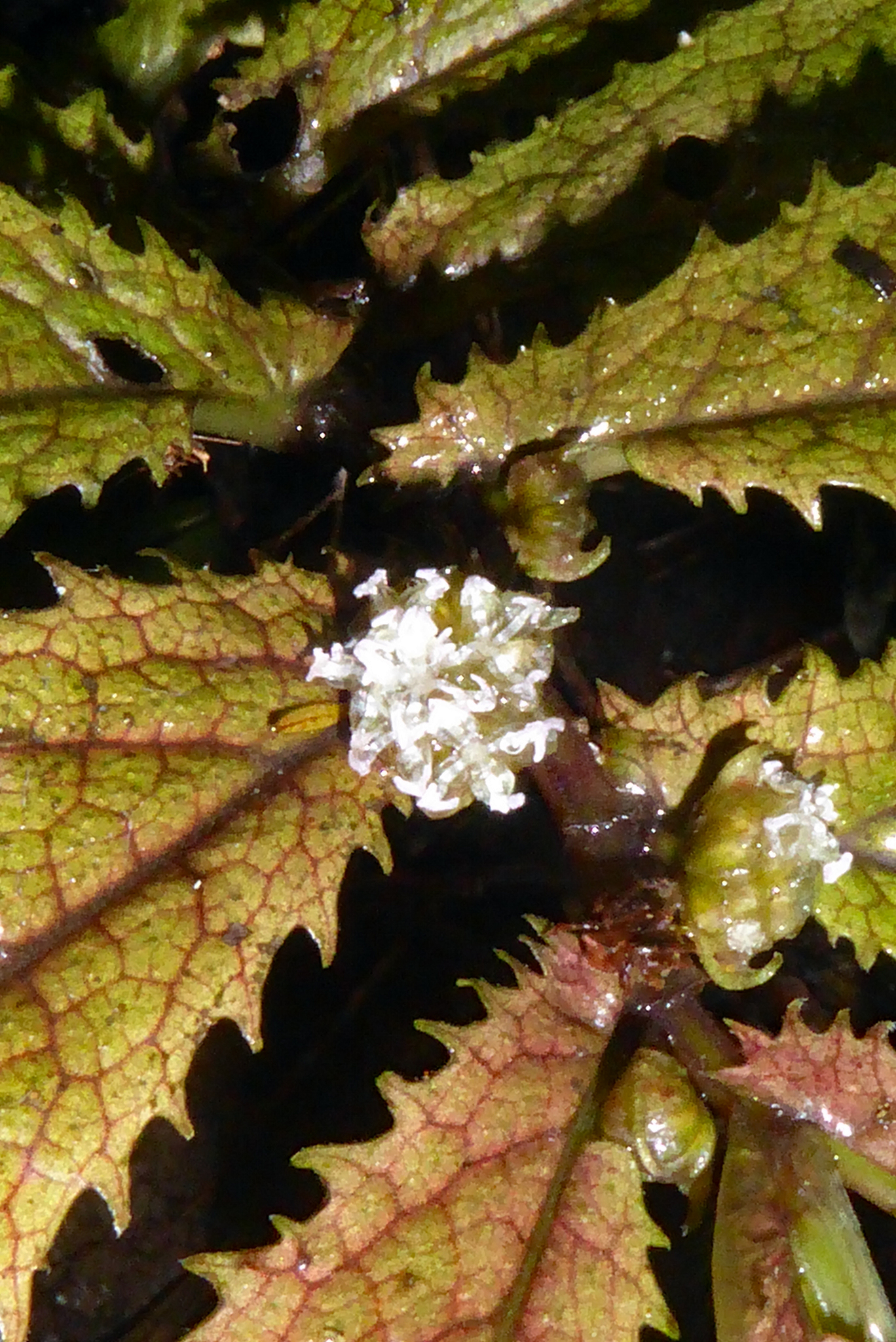
Elatostema rugosum flowers at the base of the leaves

They grow in clusters. These clusters can be up to two cm long. The clusters of flowers are generally described to be unisexual, but it is often possible to find both sexes in one. Although Cheeseman (1925) notes that both male and female clusters can be found on the same plant, Moore and Irwin (1978) describe them as generally being on separate individuals.

The male flowers come in high quantities and are often somewhat hidden by the bracts. The male flowers are each on a tiny stalk. The female flowers mostly lack a stalk, have thinner bracts, and the stigma form little tufts.

The fruits are tiny (about the size of a sand grain), and brown. The seeds are 0.6–0.8 mm long inside of a 0.8–1.0 mm achene. The seeds are dark, while the smooth, elliptic to ovate-elliptic achene is light coloured with dark projections. The achene has a sharp tip, but a more rounded base.

== Geographic distribution and habitat ==
=== Natural global range ===
Elatostema rugosum is endemic to New Zealand.

=== New Zealand range ===
Elatostema rugosum is only found naturally in the North Island of Aotearoa. It is most common on the northern part of the island, but it can be found going south until the Tararua Range. Though not naturally found in the South Island, it can survive in gardens as far south as Christchurch if it is planted below trees where it has more protection from frost. It is New Zealand’s only Elatostema species.

=== Habitat preferences ===
Elatostema rugosum thrives in wet, shaded, forest environments. It is often found along rivers and streams and in gullies. It also cascades down cliffs beside waterfalls. It can be found at elevations of 1000 meters and below.

== Life cycle/phenology ==
Elatostema rugosum flowers and fruits from September until May. iNaturalist observations have shown flowers in all months except February, March, and May. Four of these observations with flowers were in June, two were in July, and seven were in August. Elatostema rugosum’s seeds travel through water and through ballistic dispersal.

When it is cool or moderate, the seeds are able to germinate. In a propagation setting, the seeds have been known to store quite easily. Also in terms of propagation, division is an effective method.

== Diet / prey / predators ==
=== Diet and foraging ===
The soil moisture and environmental preferences of Elatostema rugosum can be easily found from the fact that its presence is a way of knowing if an area consistently experiences wet, shaded conditions. It does best in full shade. This plant can be found so close to streams that its foliage dips into them, which can form microhabitats for invertebrates. It is often found in rocky areas, specifically wet rocky areas. Heavy frost, especially when no overhanging vegetation for protection is present, is damaging to it. It also struggles in dry conditions.

=== Predators, parasites, and diseases ===
Elatostema rugosum is thought to be a host plant for Mnesictena marmarina. Caterpillars of Udea marmarina are also found on its leaves. It is also a host for the Coccidae and Ctenochiton insects. It is a host for the fungus Hypocrella duplex. It is also a host for the green algae Phycopeltis irregularis. Elatostema rugosum is an isolate source for Candida albicans and Gordonia.

In gardens, slugs and snails inflict damage upon it.

More research and synthesis should be done regarding interactions with this plant species since only two of these interactions were recognised by GlOBI and Plant-SyNZ recognises no interactions with Elatostema rugosum.

== Other information ==
=== Māori uses ===
When cooking kūmara in a hāngī, Māori people wrapped it in parataniwha leaves to add flavour.

=== Conservation status ===
This species is not threatened according to the last assessment in 2017.

=== Chemical properties ===
Some tests have shown anti-bacterial functions in the leaves of Elatostema rugosum. A study on antioxidant properties in the different-coloured leaves of Elatostema rugosum revealed that the red leaves (those with more anthocyanins) had higher antioxidant activity. Anthocyanins and antioxidant activity were found to be highest in younger leaves. This makes sense because this is a time of stress in the plant’s life. In plants, stressful times can lead to cell damage caused by the presence of free radicals and reactive oxygen species. Antioxidants help control this problem. This means that red leaves have an advantage. It is possible that red leaves have more UV exposure than the green ones that are usually found in deeper shade. It is also possible that the antioxidant activity and anthocyanins decrease with age because the plant might eventually synthesise enzymes to perform the same function.

=== Name origins ===
The genus name Elatostema comes from Greek origins and essentially means “exploding stamens.”

The common name parataniwha, roughly translates to "home of the taniwha" and suggests the presence of a taniwha, a powerful supernatural being in Māori mythology.
