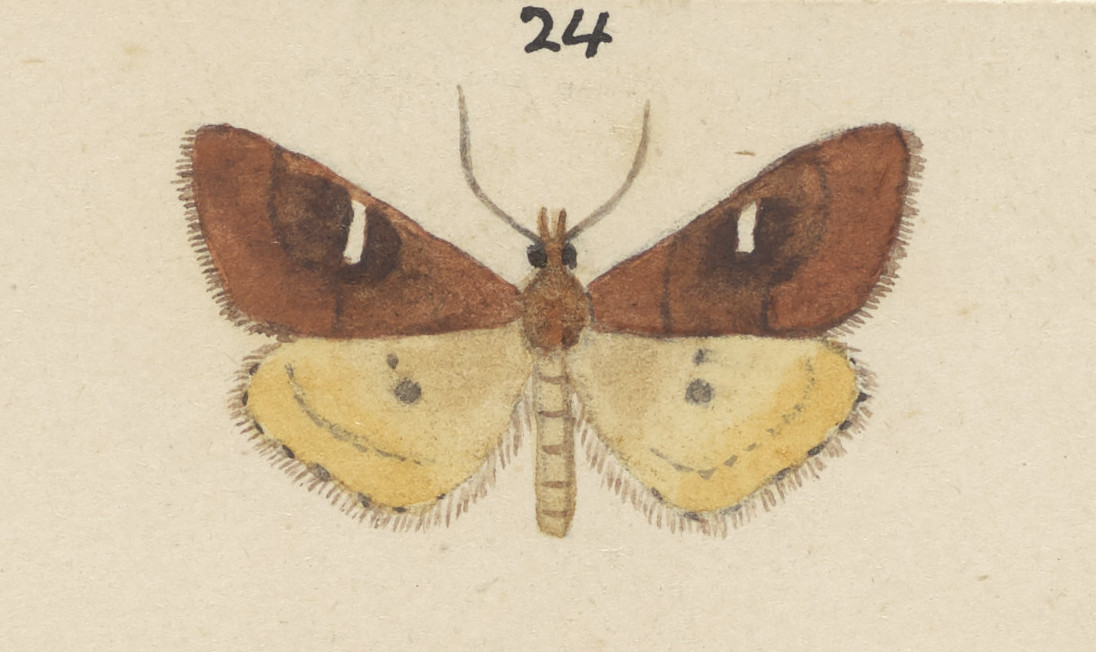

Scientific classification
- Domain: Eukaryota
- Kingdom: Animalia
- Phylum: Arthropoda
- Class: Insecta
- Order: Lepidoptera
- Family: Crambidae
- Genus: Mnesictena
- Species: M. adversa

Binomial name
- Mnesictena adversa (Philpott, 1917)

Synonyms
- Mecyna adversa Philpott, 1917; Udea adversa (Philpott, 1917)

= Mnesictena adversa =

Species of moth endemic to New Zealand

Mnesictena adversa is a moth in the family Crambidae. It was described by Alfred Philpott in 1917 and is endemic to New Zealand.

== Taxonomy ==
This species was first described by Alfred Philpott in 1917 and named Mecyna adversa. In 1988 J. S. Dugdale discussed this species under the name Mnesictena adversa. In 2010 the publication The New Zealand Inventory of Biodiversity placed this species in the genus Udea and this placement has been followed by many New Zealand natural history institutions and collections. However this placement has been brought into doubt by the work of Richard Mally and Matthias Nuss.

== Description ==
The wingspan is 20–21 mm for males and females. The forewings are ferruginous, but brighter along the costa. There is an irregular transverse outwardly-oblique white discal dot at the middle and a dark, obscurely indicated second line. The hindwings are yellow with the discal dot and terminal band fuscous.
