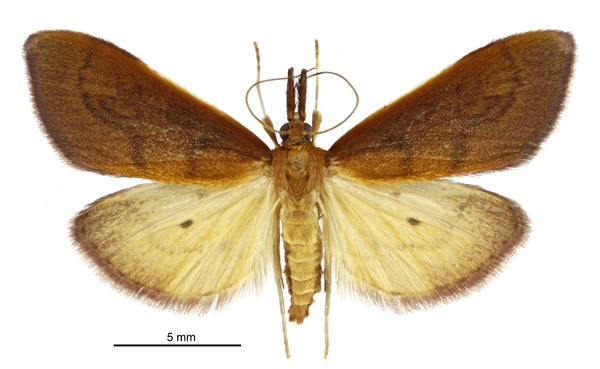
- Mnesictena daiclesalis female
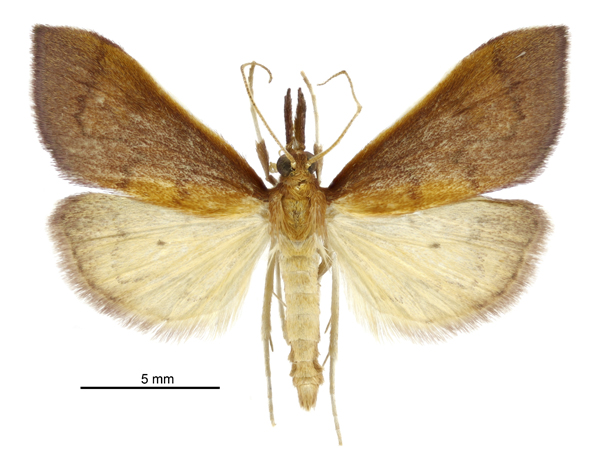
- Mnesictena daiclesalis male

Scientific classification
- Kingdom: Animalia
- Phylum: Arthropoda
- Class: Insecta
- Order: Lepidoptera
- Family: Crambidae
- Genus: Mnesictena
- Species: M. daiclesalis

Binomial name
- Mnesictena daiclesalis (Walker, 1859)

Synonyms
- Scopula daiclesalis Walker, 1859; Botys otagalis C. Felder, R. Felder & Rogenhofer, 1875; Mecyna daiclealis (Walker, 1859)

= Mnesictena daiclesalis =

Species of moth

Mnesictena daiclesalis is a moth in the family Crambidae. It was described by Francis Walker in 1859. It is endemic to New Zealand.

The wingspan is about 22 mm. The forewings are ferruginous brown, irrorated (sprinkled) with dark grey. The inner margin is rather broadly suffused with ochreous orange from the base to three-fourths and there is a narrow ochreous-orange streak along the costa from the base to three-fourths, enclosing a very slender snow-white costal streak from one-fourth to two-thirds. The lines are thick, cloudy, dark grey and very indistinctly defined. The reniform is obscurely outlined with dark grey. The hindwings are light ochreous yellowish with a dark-grey dot in the centre of the disc and partial indications of a slender greyish line at two-thirds.
