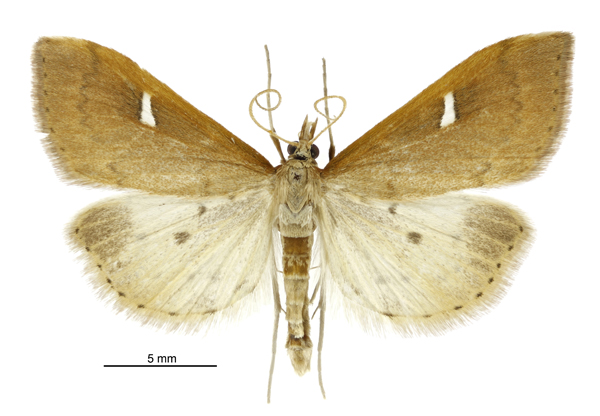
- Mnesictena notata male

Scientific classification
- Kingdom: Animalia
- Phylum: Arthropoda
- Clade: Pancrustacea
- Class: Insecta
- Order: Lepidoptera
- Family: Crambidae
- Genus: Mnesictena
- Species: M. notata

Binomial name
- Mnesictena notata (Butler, 1879)

Synonyms
- Scopula notata Butler, 1879; Mecyna notata (Butler, 1879); Udea notata (Butler, 1879)

= Mnesictena notata =

Species of moth

Mnesictena notata is a moth in the family Crambidae. It was described by Arthur Gardiner Butler in 1879. It is endemic to New Zealand.

== Taxonomy ==
This species was first described by Arthur Gardiner Butler in 1879 and named Scopula notata. In 1988 J. S. Dugdale discussed this species under the name Mnesictena notata. In 2010 the publication The New Zealand Inventory of Biodiversity placed this species in the genus Udea. However this placement was brought into doubt by the work of Richard Mally and Matthias Nuss.

== Description ==
The forewings are reddish clay coloured, slightly sericeous (silky). The discoidal area is dusky and there is a black-edged white rhomboidal spot at the end of the cell, as well as a grey discal line, arched beyond the cell and with a zigzag course from the first median branch to the inner margin. The hindwings are pale creamy ochreous, speckled at the apex and on the basal area with grey scales. Two black spots are placed obliquely at the end of the cell and there is a marginal series of black dots.

== Behaviour ==
Adults are attracted to light and have been collected via a mercury vapour light trap.
