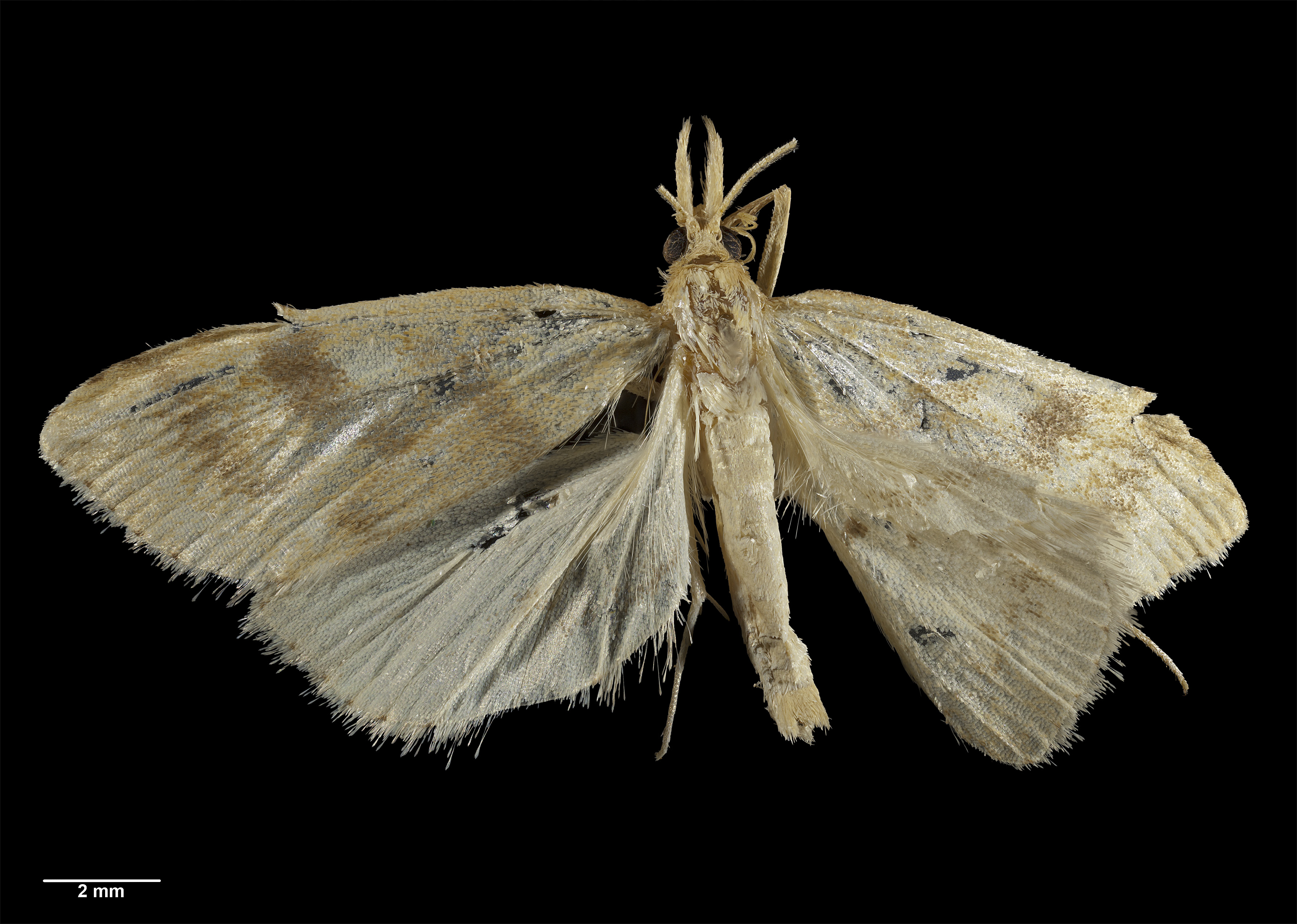

Scientific classification
- Kingdom: Animalia
- Phylum: Arthropoda
- Class: Insecta
- Order: Lepidoptera
- Family: Crambidae
- Genus: Mnesictena
- Species: M. antipodea

Binomial name
- Mnesictena antipodea (Salmon in Salmon & Bradley, 1956)

Synonyms
- Mecyna antipodea Salmon in Salmon & Bradley, 1956; Udea antipodea (Salmon in Salmon & Bradley, 1956)

= Mnesictena antipodea =

Species of moth

Mnesictena antipodea is a moth in the family Crambidae. It was described by John T. Salmon in 1956. This species is endemic to New Zealand, where it has been recorded from the Antipodes Islands.

The wingspan is about 24 mm. The forewings are pale yellowish white speckled with bright orange scales. The first line is brown and a broad area of pale orange-brown is found along the dorsum between the first and second lines. The second line is slightly darker brown than the first. The hindwings are white with scattered brown scales.
