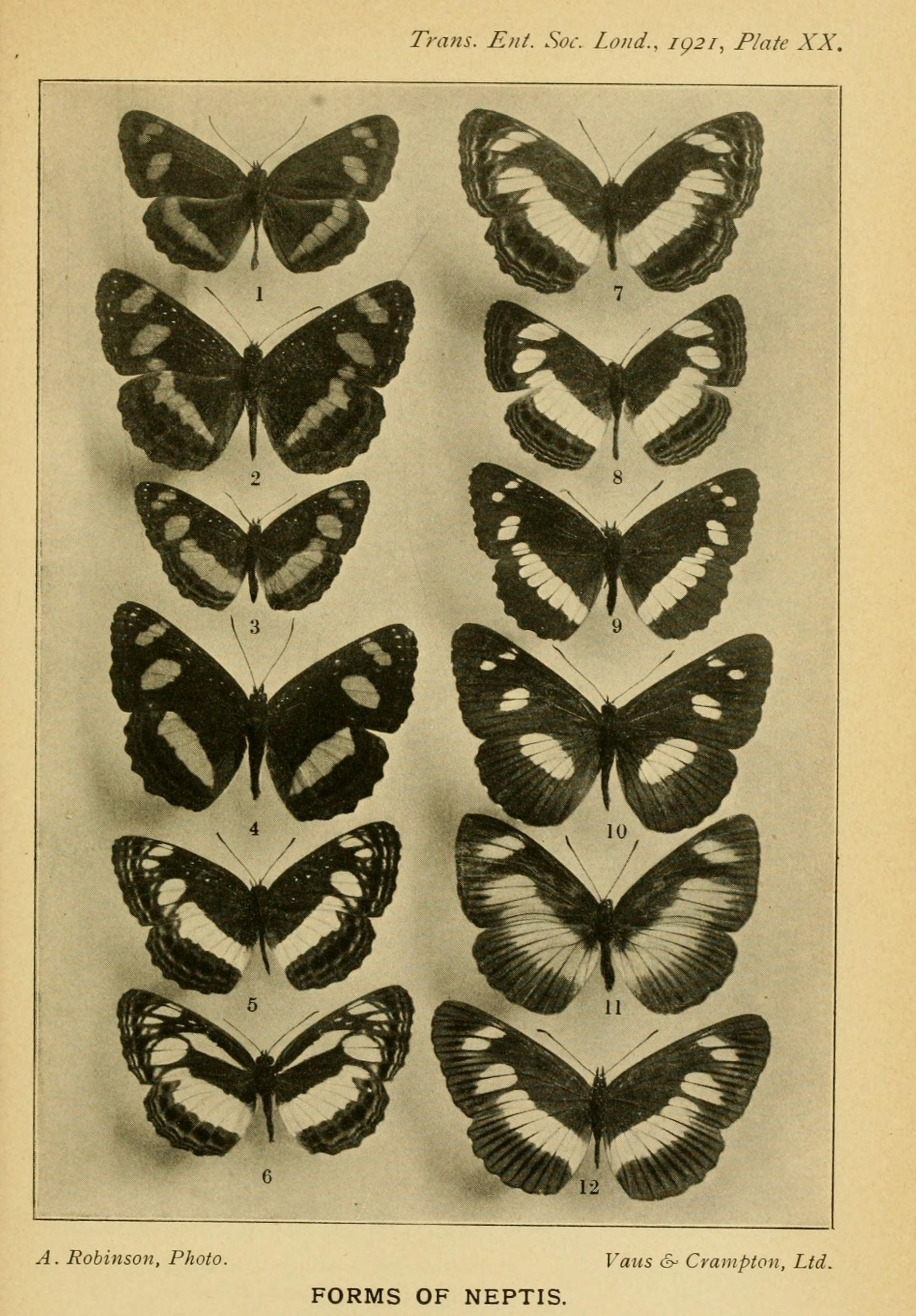
- Figure 6

Scientific classification
- Kingdom: Animalia
- Phylum: Arthropoda
- Clade: Pancrustacea
- Class: Insecta
- Order: Lepidoptera
- Family: Nymphalidae
- Genus: Neptis
- Species: N. metella

Binomial name
- Neptis metella (Doubleday, 1848)

Synonyms
- Limenitis metella Doubleday, 1848; Neptis gratilla Mabille, 1880; Neptis metella ab. brunni Schultze, 1916; Neptis metella f. vinalli Eltringham, 1929

= Neptis metella =

Species of butterfly

Neptis metella, the yellow-base sailer, is a butterfly in the family Nymphalidae. It is found in Guinea, Sierra Leone, Liberia, Ivory Coast, Ghana, Togo, Benin, from Nigeria to the Democratic Republic of the Congo and in Uganda, Sudan, Kenya and Tanzania. The habitat consists of forests.

== Description ==
N. metella Dbl. Hew. (48 c) is the only African species in which the underside of the hindwing proximally to the median band is yellow with numerous sharply defined, rounded blackish spots. The cell of the forewing at its hindmargin with long white longitudinal stripes, slightly widened distally; the hindmarginal spot very small, discal spots 2 and 3 rather large, not or narrowly separated from one another, cliscal spots 4—6 small and separated; marginal line 1 is placed far from the distal margin and consists of small, irregularly arranged, free spots, closely approximated to the discal spots; marginal line 4 is absent on both wings above and is only weakly marked beneath; median band of the hindwing 3–4 mm. in breadth, on the under surface distally bounded by black spots; the first margined line of the hindwing dull and separated by large, free blackish spots from the second marginal line, which is broader and whiter. Sierra Leone to the southern Congo and the Victoria Nyanza. —• gratilla Mab. only differs in the larger and more sharply prominent white markings. Madagascar

== Biology ==
The larvae feed on Acalypha neptunica pubescens.

== Subspecies ==
- Neptis metella metella (Guinea, Sierra Leone, Liberia, Ivory Coast, Ghana, Togo, Benin, Nigeria to Democratic Republic of the Congo, western Uganda, southern Sudan, north-western Tanzania)
- Neptis metella flavimacula Jackson, 1951 (Uganda: east to the western slopes of Mount Elgon, western Kenya)

Torben Larsen developed a species numbering system for his 2005 publication Butterflies of West Africa. The nominate subspecies is #903. The 'Larsen' numbers have since been used with permission in A Sharp Eye on Butterflies of Ghana.

== Taxonomy ==
It is the nominotypical member of the metella Species groupThe species of this group differing from other Neptis with a 'white discal band in having the base of the hind¬ wing beneath spotted, not banded with white. The first marginal band of the forewing forms at vein 4 a sharp angle proximad.

The members are

- Neptis metella
- Neptis saclava
