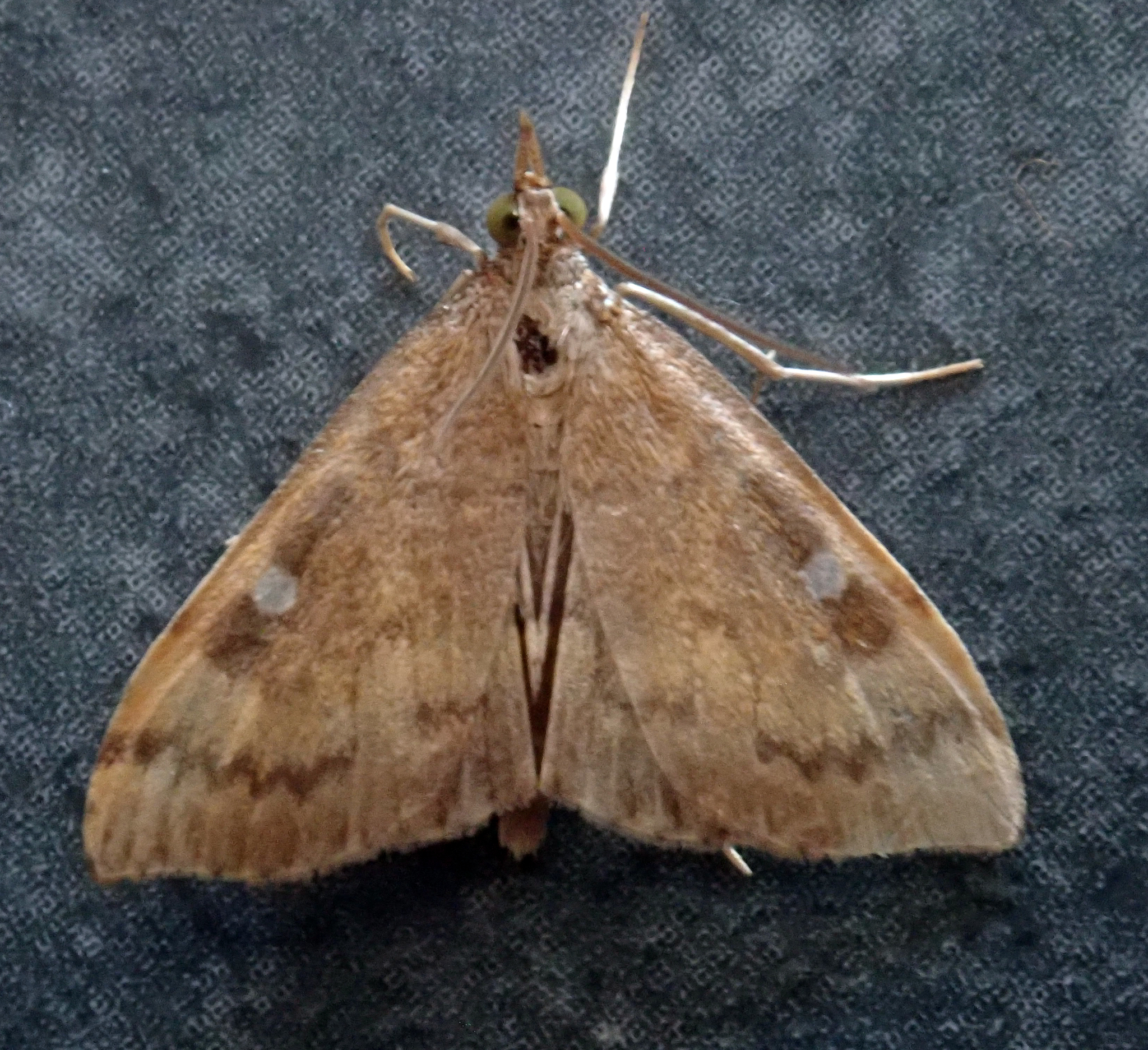
- Mnesictena pantheropa seen in the Chatham Islands, New Zealand

Scientific classification
- Kingdom: Animalia
- Phylum: Arthropoda
- Class: Insecta
- Order: Lepidoptera
- Family: Crambidae
- Genus: Mnesictena
- Species: M. pantheropa

Binomial name
- Mnesictena pantheropa (Meyrick, 1884)

Synonyms
- Mecyna pantheropa Meyrick, 1884; Udea pantheropa (Meyrick, 1884)

= Mnesictena pantheropa =

Species of moth

Mnesictena pantheropa is a moth in the family Crambidae. It was described by Edward Meyrick in 1884. It is endemic to New Zealand, where it has been recorded from the Chatham Islands.

The wingspan is 25–26 mm. The forewings are orange, variably mixed with reddish-fuscous or dark fuscous, especially on the veins and some specimens are wholly suffused with fuscous. The extreme costal edge is sometimes whitish in the middle. The markings are reddish-brown, mixed or suffused with dark grey and there is a suffusion along the basal part of the costa, sometimes extending basally to the dorsum. The first line is irregularly curved and the second denticulate, forming a strong subquadrate loop inwards below the middle, the space between them wholly suffused with dark except along the costa and on a band preceding the upper half of the second line. Sometimes, there is a sharply defined irregular transverse or rhomboidal clear white discal spot at the middle. There is a moderate terminal fascia, suffusedly projecting inwards opposite the loop of the second line. The hindwings are whitish-yellowish, becoming whitish towards the costa. The dorsal area is suffused with grey and there are two dark grey discal dots very obliquely placed. Sometimes, there is a grey postmedian line. The terminal fascia is suffused dark grey, sometimes very narrow or obsolete except at the apex and there is a terminal series of dark grey dots.
