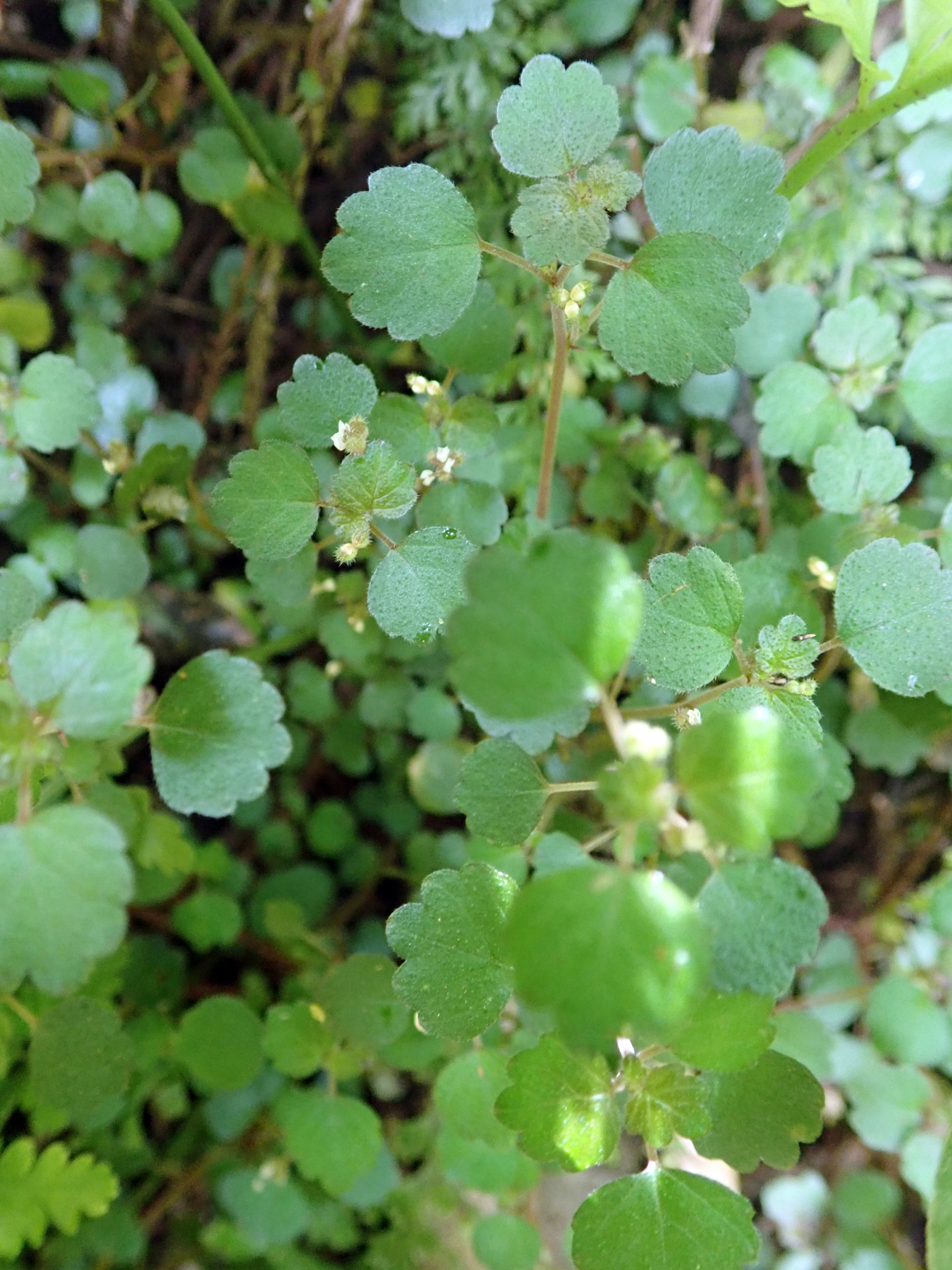
- Foliage and flower buds
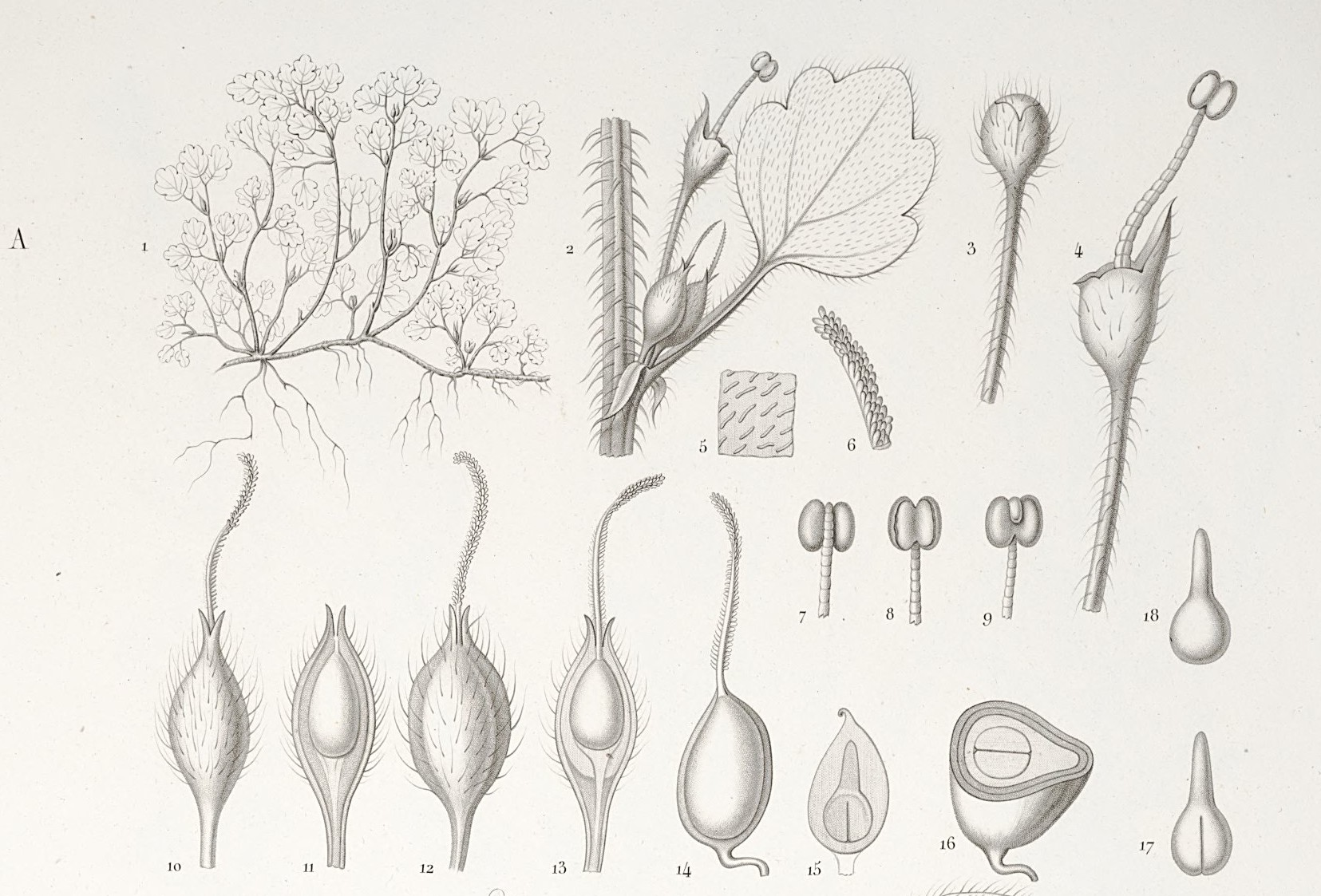
- Botanical illustration

Scientific classification
- Kingdom: Plantae
- Clade: Embryophytes
- Clade: Tracheophytes
- Clade: Angiosperms
- Clade: Eudicots
- Clade: Rosids
- Order: Rosales
- Family: Urticaceae
- Genus: Australina
- Species: A. pusilla

Binomial name
- Australina pusilla (Poir.) Gaudich.

Synonyms
- Australina hispidula Colenso; Australina muelleri Wedd.; Australina novae-zelandiae Hook.f.; Australina pusilla var. major Hook.f.; Australina pusilla var. minor Hook.f.; Australina septemdentata Gand.; Australina tasmanica Hook.f.; Urtica pusilla Poir.; Urtica tasmanica F.Muell.

= Australina pusilla =

Species of flowering plant

Australina pusilla, the small shade nettle, is a species of flowering plant in the family Urticaceae, native to eastern Australia, and New Zealand. A highly variable perennial herb reaching 50 cm (20 in), it is often found growing alongside shady streams.

== Subtaxa ==
The following subspecies are accepted:

- Australina pusilla subsp. muelleri (Wedd.) Friis & Wilmot-Dear – Queensland, New South Wales, Victoria, Tasmania
- Australina pusilla subsp. pusilla – New South Wales, Victoria, Tasmania, North Island, South Island
