= Australinina =

Scientific classification
- Domain: Eukaryota
- Kingdom: Animalia
- Phylum: Arthropoda
- Class: Insecta
- Order: Diptera
- Family: Lauxaniidae
- Genus: Australinina; Strand, 1928

Synonyms
- Australina Malloch, 1925

Genus of insects

Australinina is a genus of flies belonging to the family Lauxaniidae.

The species of this genus are found in Australia.

Species:

- Australinina geniseta (Malloch, 1925)
- Australinina plax Kim, 1994
- Australinina spatula Kim, 1994
