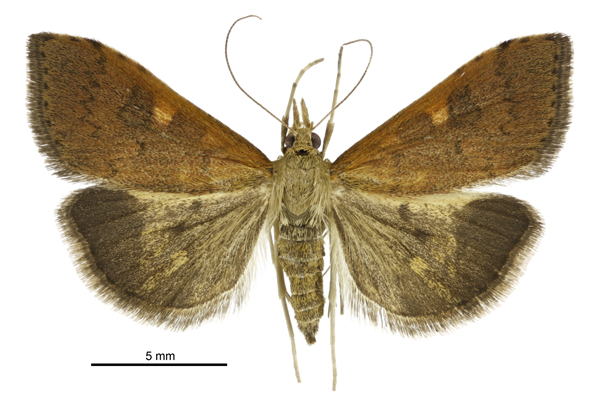
- Female
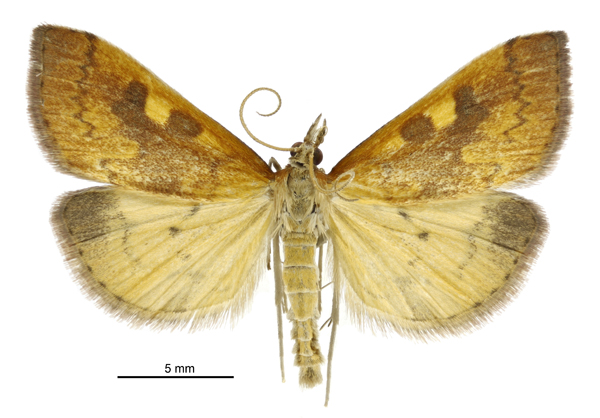
- Male

Scientific classification
- Kingdom: Animalia
- Phylum: Arthropoda
- Clade: Pancrustacea
- Class: Insecta
- Order: Lepidoptera
- Family: Crambidae
- Subfamily: Spilomelinae
- Tribe: Udeini
- Genus: Mnesictena
- Species: M. flavidalis

Binomial name
- Mnesictena flavidalis (Doubleday, 1843)

Synonyms
- Margaritia flavidalis Doubleday, 1843; Udea flavidalis (Doubleday, 1843); Margaritia quadralis Doubleday, 1843; Scopula dipsasalis Walker, 1859; Mecyna flavidalis (Doubleday, 1843)

= Mnesictena flavidalis =

Species of moth

Mnesictena flavidalis is a moth in the family Crambidae. It was described by Edward Doubleday in 1843. It is endemic to New Zealand.

== Taxonomy ==
This species was first described by Edward Doubleday in Ernst Dieffenbach's book Travels in New Zealand: with contributions to the geography, geology, botany and natural history of the country and named Margaritia flavidalis. In 1899 Hampson placed this species in the genus Mnesictena. In 1983 G. E. Munroe synonymised the genus Mnesictena with Udea. However, in 1988 John S. Dugdale treated Mnesictena as a valid genus. Dugdale's treatment was followed in 2011 by Richard Mally and Matthias Nuss. The male holotype specimen, collected in Auckland by A. Sinclair, is held at the Natural History Museum, London.

== Description ==
Doubleday described this species as follows:

All the wings ochraceous, the outer margins with a series of minute dots. Anterior wings with a faint striga near the base, a still fainter one near the middle, and a more distinct much-waved one near the outer margin, and two discoidal stigmatiform spots fuscous. Posterior wings with a discoidal spot, preceded towards the anterior margin by a smaller one, a transverse striga beyond the middle, and the anal angle fuscous.

== Behaviour ==
Adults are attracted to light and have been collected via a mercury vapour light trap.
