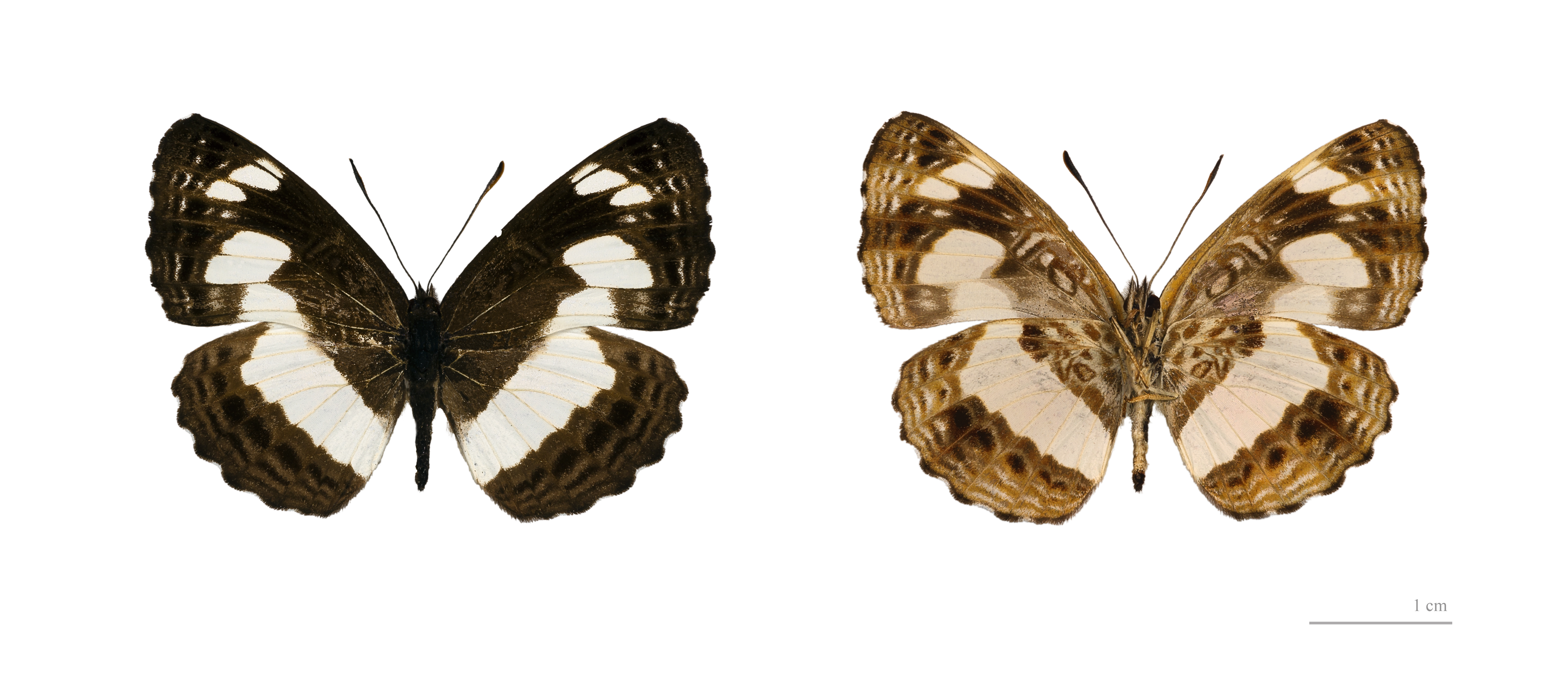

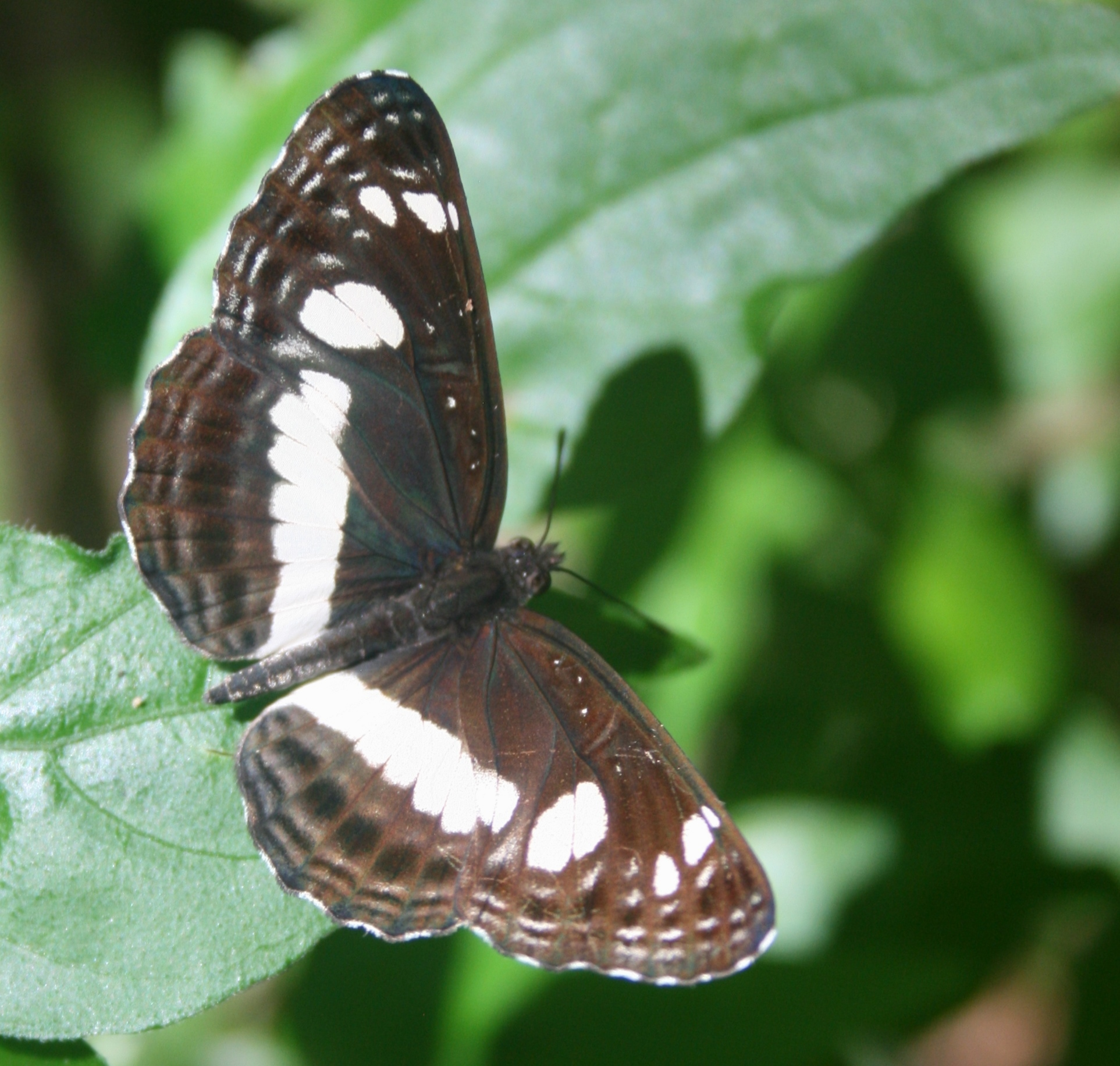
- N. s. saclava of Madagascar (above) and N. saclava marpessa (below)

Scientific classification
- Kingdom: Animalia
- Phylum: Arthropoda
- Class: Insecta
- Order: Lepidoptera
- Family: Nymphalidae
- Genus: Neptis
- Species: N. saclava

Binomial name
- Neptis saclava Boisduval, 1833

Synonyms
- Neptis marpessa Hopffer, 1855; Neptis nemetes pasteuri Snellen, 1882; Neptis saclava marpessa ab. sheppardi Stevenson, 1940

= Neptis saclava =

Spotted sailer

Species of butterfly

Neptis saclava, the spotted sailer, is a butterfly of the family Nymphalidae. It is native to Madagascar and to large areas of sub-Saharan Africa.

Its wingspan is 40–45 mm in males and 45–48 mm in females The hindwing beneath at the base with whitish ground-colour and numerous irregular light red-brown spots, more or less joined together; cell of the forewing above unicolorous or with small white dots, beneath white with irregular light red-brown markings; discal spot 4 of the forewing is absent or very small, dot-like; the hindmarginal spot of the forewing is. large and touches the spot in cellule 2 or is only narrowly separated from it; the median band of the hindwing is 4—-7 mm. in breadth. Madagascar Images BOLD

Adults are on the wing year round with a peak from December to May.

The larvae feed on Acalypha glabrata, Combretum bracteosum, Ricinus communis, Australina, and Pilea.

== Subspecies ==
Recognised subspecies:

- N. s. saclava – Madagascar
- N. s. marpessa Hopffer, 1855 – small spotted sailer, native to southern Nigeria, Cameroon to Ethiopia to Zambia, Mozambique, Zimbabwe, Eswatini, South Africa: Limpopo, Mpumalanga, North West, Gauteng, KwaZulu-Natal, Eastern Cape only differs [from s.saclava] a little in the narrower median band of the hindwing and the smaller, more widely sepa¬ rated, white spots on the forewing.

== Taxonomy ==
It is a member of the Neptis metella Species group
