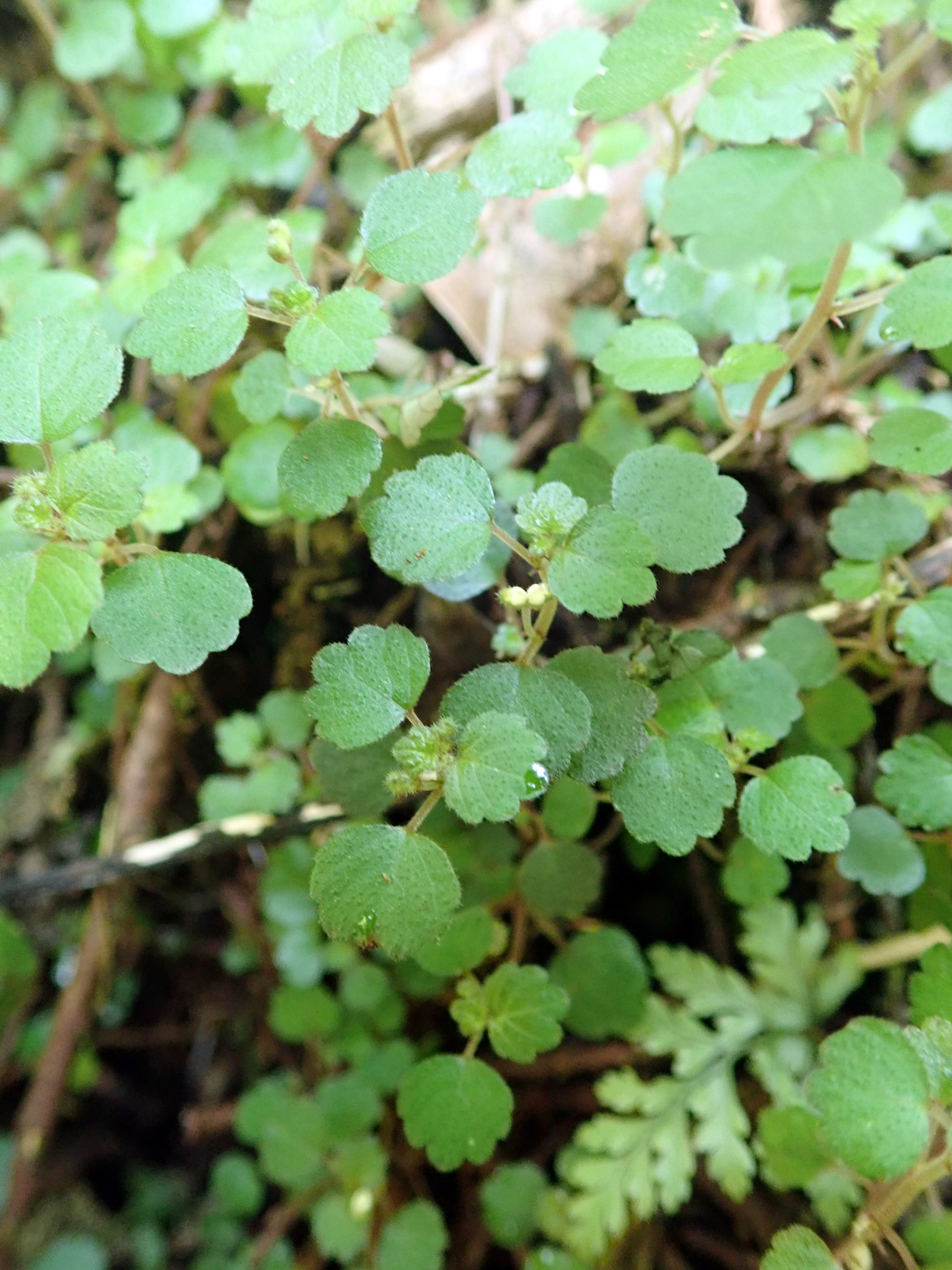
- Australina pusilla

Scientific classification
- Kingdom: Plantae
- Clade: Tracheophytes
- Clade: Angiosperms
- Clade: Eudicots
- Clade: Rosids
- Order: Rosales
- Family: Urticaceae
- Genus: Australina; Gaudich.

= Australina (plant) =

Genus of plants

Australina is a genus of flowering plants belonging to the family Urticaceae.

Its native range is north-eastern and eastern tropical Africa, Australasia.

Species:

- Australina flaccida (A.Rich.) Wedd.
- Australina pusilla (Poir.) Gaudich.
