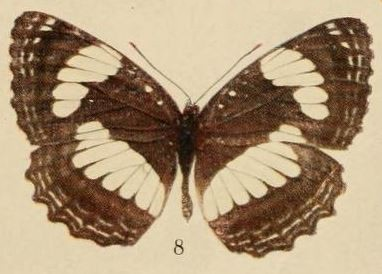

Scientific classification
- Domain: Eukaryota
- Kingdom: Animalia
- Phylum: Arthropoda
- Class: Insecta
- Order: Lepidoptera
- Family: Nymphalidae
- Genus: Neptis
- Species: N. agatha

Binomial name
- Neptis agatha Stoll, 1781

= Neptis agatha =

Species of butterfly

Neptis agatha is a butterfly in the family Nymphalidae. It is found in Sierra Leone, Abyssinia East Africa and Natal.

It is the nominotypical member of the Neptis agatha species group. The forms of this group may be at once recognized by the underside of the hindwing having 2 or 3 continuous white transverse bands at the base (cf. agatha underside, 48 d) and by the cell having white dots or being only striped with white at the anterior margin. Some of the numerous forms are very nearly allied. The group members are :

- Neptis agatha Stoll, 1781
- Neptis laeta Overlaet, 1955
- Neptis serena Overlaet, 1955
- Neptis kiriakoffi Overlaet, 1955
- Neptis morosa Overlaet, 1955
- Neptis jordani Neave, 1910
- Neptis alta Overlaet, 1955 Now in Neptis nysiades group
- Neptis gratiosa Overlaet, 1955
- Neptis constantiae Carcasson, 1961
- Neptis loma Condamin, 1971
- Neptis angusta Condamin, 1966
- Neptis katama Collins & Larsen, 1991
- Neptis rogersi Eltringham, 1921
- Neptis nysiades Hewitson, 1868
- Neptis clarei Neave, 1904
- Neptis conspicua Neave, 1904
- Neptis poultoni Eltringham, 1921
- Neptis nina Staudinger, 1896;
- Neptis nicomedes Hewitson, 1874;
- Neptis strigata Aurivillius, 1894
- Neptis nicobule Eltringham, 1922,
- Neptis nicoteles Hewitson, 1874
- Neptis trigonophora Butler, 1878
- Neptis livingstonei Suffert, 1904
- Neptis lermanni*
- Neptis nebrodes*
- Neptis jamesoni*
- Neptis rothschildi*
- Neptis penningtoni*
- Neptis eltringhami*
- Neptis larseni*
- Neptis nzedurai*
- Added by Richardson
