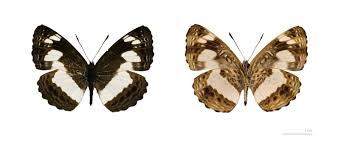

Scientific classification
- Kingdom: Animalia
- Phylum: Arthropoda
- Class: Insecta
- Order: Lepidoptera
- Family: Nymphalidae
- Genus: Neptis
- Species: N. livingstonei

Binomial name
- Neptis livingstonei Suffert, 1904

= Neptis livingstonei =

Species of butterfly

Neptis livingstonei is a butterfly in the family Nymphalidae. It is found in Tanzania.

N. livingstonei Suff. is similar to Neptis agatha [ agatha species group ], but the median band of the hindwing is much narrower and only reaches vein 6, its spot in cellule 5 is small and not so long as the one in 2; the first marginal line is thicker and placed further from the distal margin and the marginal lines are not interrupted in cellule 3 of the forewing; the discal band of the forewing is narrowed towards the costal margin, as in jordani. German East Africa: Lukuledi.

Known only from the Holotype.
