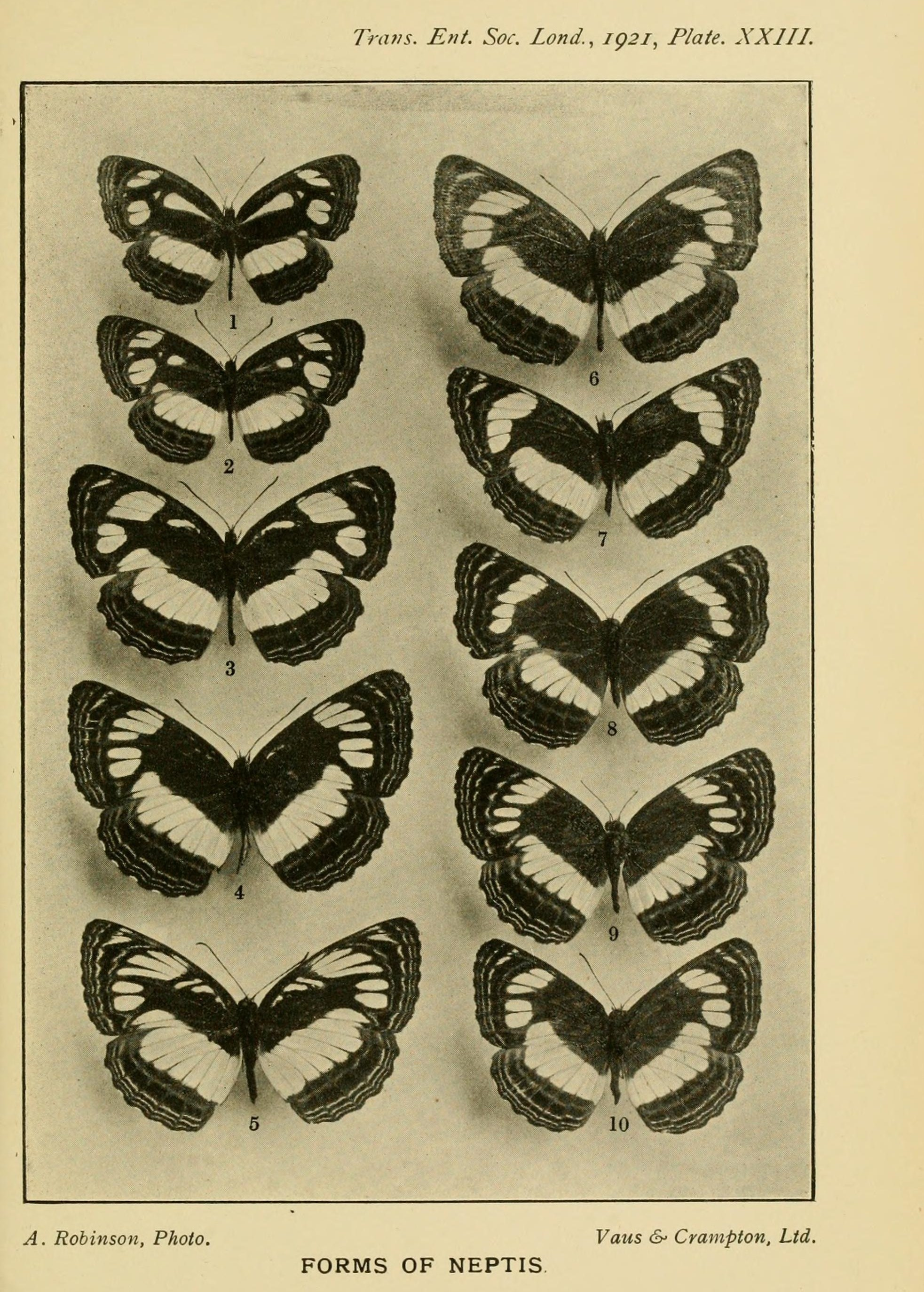
- Male, figure 1
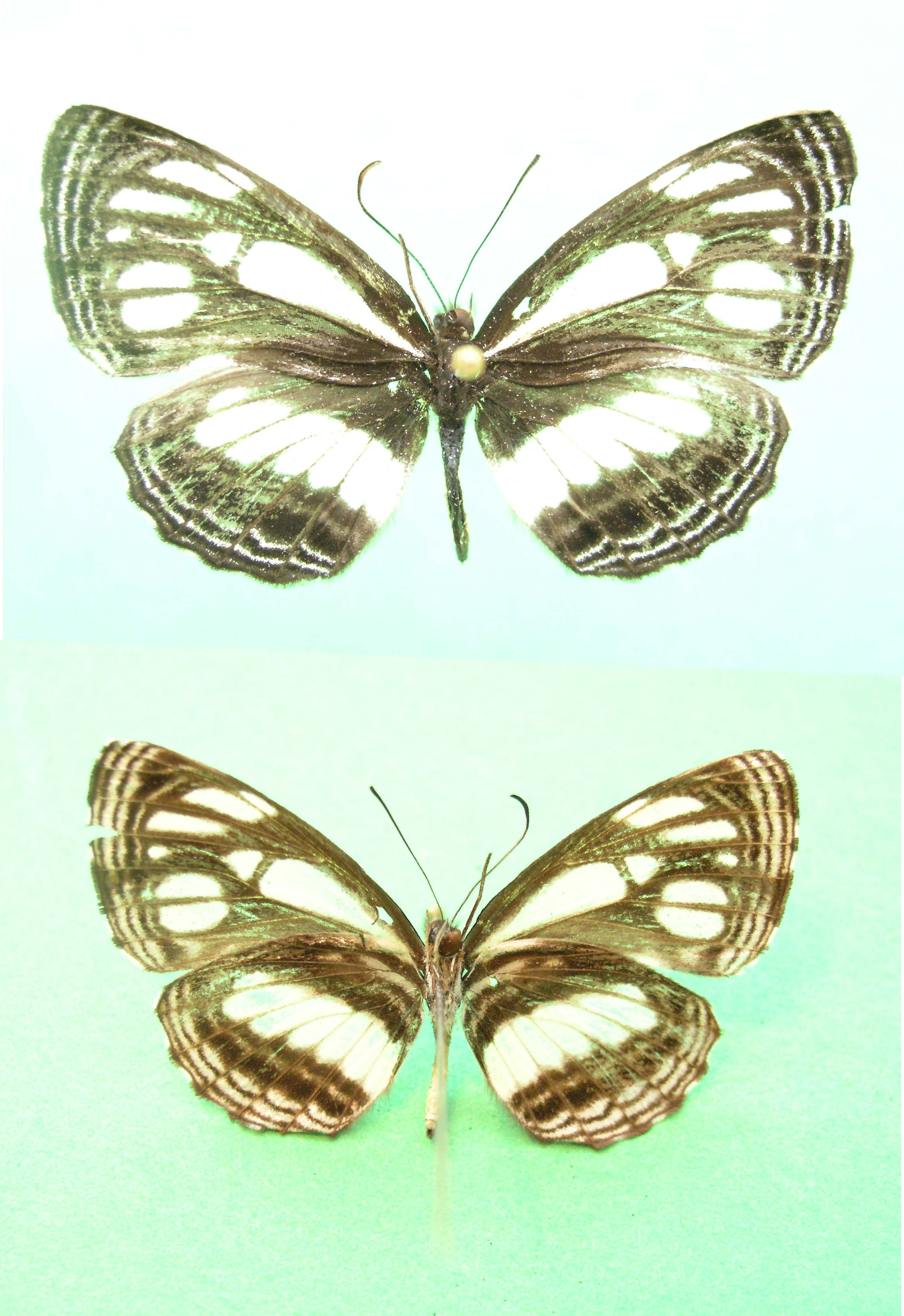

Scientific classification
- Domain: Eukaryota
- Kingdom: Animalia
- Phylum: Arthropoda
- Class: Insecta
- Order: Lepidoptera
- Family: Nymphalidae
- Genus: Neptis
- Species: N. melicerta

Binomial name
- Neptis melicerta (Drury, 1773)

Synonyms
- Papilio melicerta Drury, 1773; Papilio blandina Stoll, 1780; Nymphalis melinoe Godart, 1824

= Neptis melicerta =

Species of butterfly

Neptis melicerta, the original club-dot sailer or streaked sailer, is a butterfly in the family Nymphalidae. It is found in Guinea-Bissau, Guinea, Sierra Leone, Liberia, Ivory Coast, Ghana, Nigeria, Cameroon, Gabon, the Republic of the Congo, Angola, the Democratic Republic of the Congo and western Uganda. The habitat consists of forests.

== Description ==
The white longitudinal stripe in the cell of the forewing with a very prominent, small, free, triangular white spot at the end. Discal spot 4 on the forewing is small and triangular and placed quite free on the first marginal line. The marginal lines of the forewing more or less broadly interrupted in cellule 3.Discal spots 5 and 6 on the forewing narrow and completely separated or only touching at the inner angle; median band of the hindwing 3—-4 mm. in breadth; the second marginal line on the underside of the hindwing much thickened. A common species, occurring from Sierra Leone to Angola and Abyssinia. — ab. melicertula Strand [now subspecies] differs in the purer white markings and the somewhat larger discal spots on the forewing. Cameroons 48a Images BOLD

== Biology ==
The larvae feed on Acacia ataxacantha, Dalbergia hostilis, Abrus canescens, Abrus pulabellus and Allophylus species

== Taxonomy ==
Species groups sensu Seitz melicerta Group. The cell of the forewing is entirely filled up with white or has a white longitudinal stripe, which follows its hindmargin and leaves the anterior part of the cell free. Discal spot 4 on the forewing is absent or quite small; hence the discal band of the forewing always consists of three separate divisions, a hindmarginal spots, two spots in 2 and 3 and two or three at the costal, margin in 5, 6 and 9. The species may be divided into two subgroups. -Subgroup A. The white longitudinal stripe in the cell of the forewing without free white spot at the end.

- Neptis jamesoni
- Neptis nicoteles
- Neptis nicobule
- Neptis lermanni
- Neptis nebrodes
- Neptis mixophyes

Subgroup B. The white longitudinal stripe in the cell of the forewing with a very prominent, small, free, triangular white spot at the end. Discal spot 4 on the forewing is small and triangular and placed quite free on the first marginal line. The marginal lines of the forewing more or less broadly interrupted in cellule 3.

- Neptis melicerta
- Neptis goochi

Species groups sensu Richardson

It is the nominotypical member of the melicerta Species group The members of the melicerta group are

- Neptis melicerta
- Neptis agouale
- Neptis carcassoni
- Neptis goochii
- Neptis nicomedes
- Neptis quintilla
- Neptis nicobule
- Neptis nina
