= Neptis angusta =

Scientific classification
- Kingdom: Animalia
- Phylum: Arthropoda
- Class: Insecta
- Order: Lepidoptera
- Family: Nymphalidae
- Genus: Neptis
- Species: N. angusta

Binomial name
- Neptis angusta Condamin, 1966

Synonyms
- Neptis constantiae angusta Condamin, 1966

Species of butterfly

Neptis angusta, or Condamin's sailer, is a butterfly in the family Nymphalidae. It is found in Ghana (the Volta Region), the Democratic Republic of the Congo (Sankuru, Tshuapa, Tshopo and Ituri), western Uganda and north-western Tanzania. It was considered a subspecies of Neptis constantiae.

== Taxonomy ==
It is a member of the Neptis agatha species group
