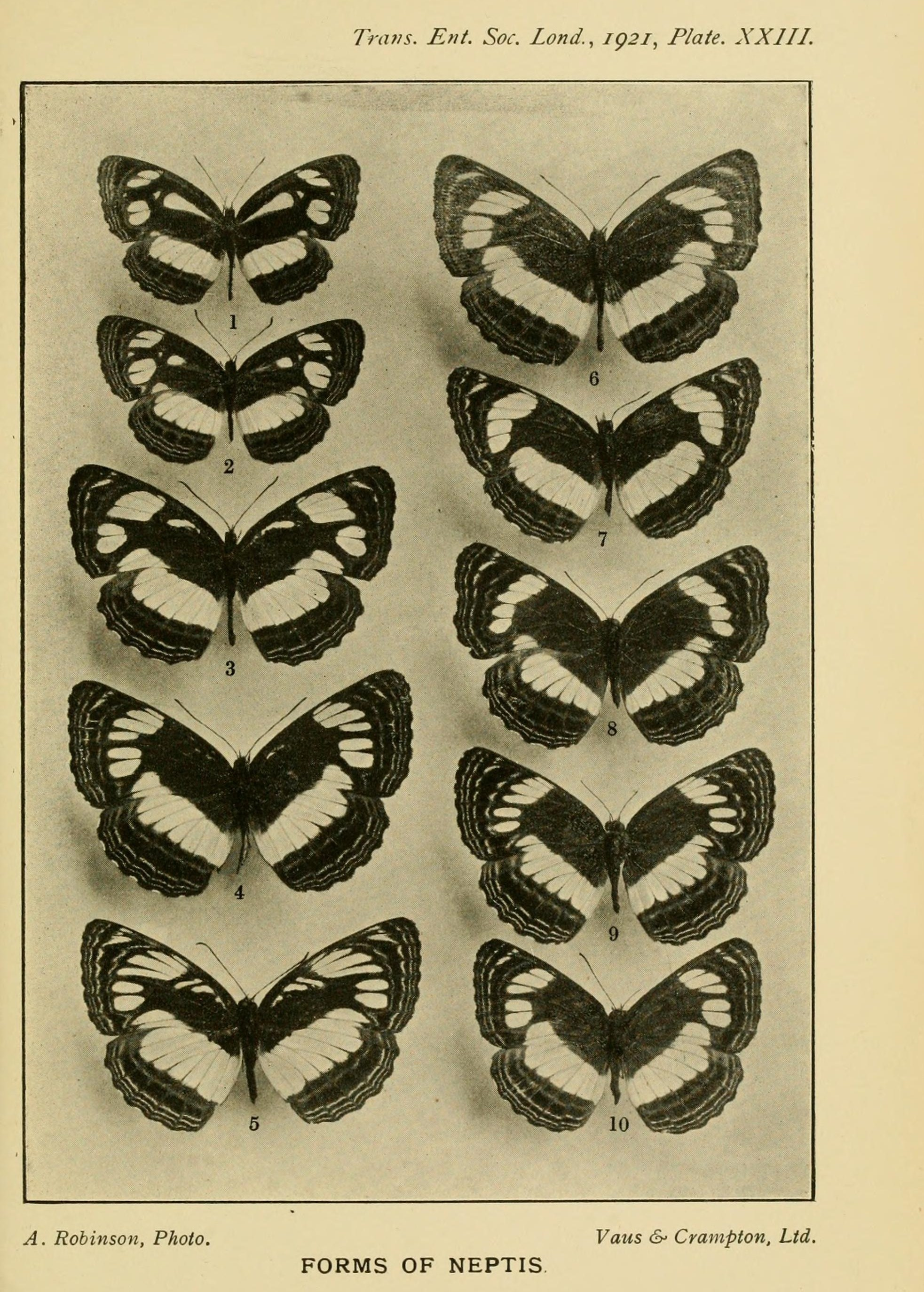
- Figure 2 male

Scientific classification
- Kingdom: Animalia
- Phylum: Arthropoda
- Class: Insecta
- Order: Lepidoptera
- Family: Nymphalidae
- Genus: Neptis
- Species: N. goochii

Binomial name
- Neptis goochii Trimen, 1879

Synonyms
- Neptis goochi

= Neptis goochii =

Small streaked sailer

Species of butterfly

Neptis goochii, the small streaked sailer, is a butterfly of the family Nymphalidae. It is found in Sub-Saharan Africa. The habitat consists of forests.

Wingspan is 30–35 mm in males and 34–38 mm in females.N. goochi Trim. (48 f) is probably merely the East African race of Neptis melicerta and only differs in having discal spots 5 and 6 on the forewing broader and more or less completely joined together, the median band of the hindwing broader, about 5 mm. in breadth, and especially in the second marginal line on the underside of the hindwing being not or but little thickened. Natal to Kilimandjaro Images BOLD

Adults are on the wing year round with a peak from December to May.

The larvae feed on Acalypha species, as well as Alchornea cordifolia and Dalbergia species.

== Taxonomy ==
It is a member of the Neptis melicerta Species group sensu Seitz

It is a member of the melicerta Species group sensu Richardson The members of the melicerta group are

- Neptis melicerta
- Neptis agouale
- Neptis carcassoni
- Neptis goochii
- Neptis nicomedes
- Neptis quintilla
- Neptis nicobule
- Neptis nina
