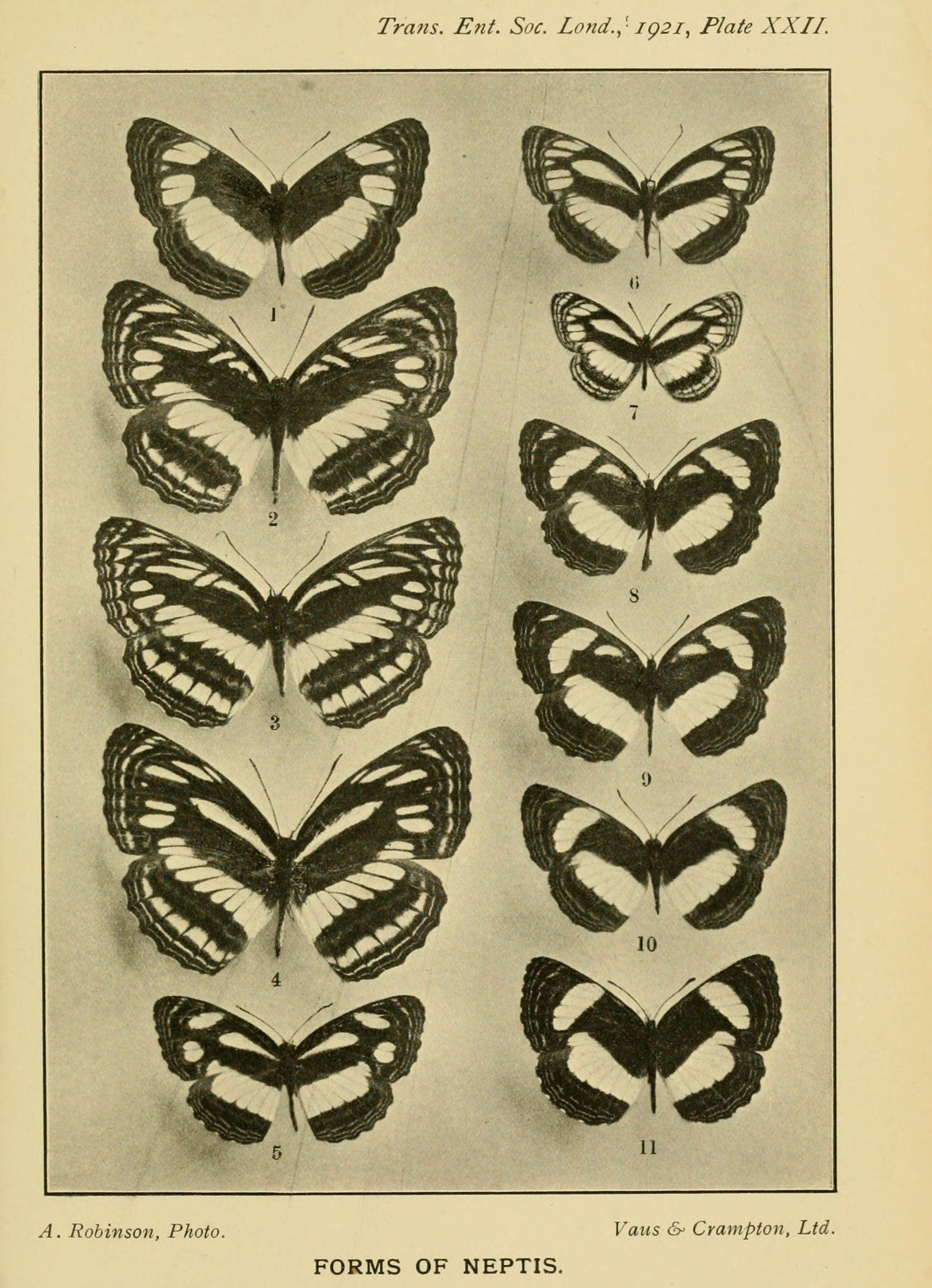
- Female, figure 12

Scientific classification
- Kingdom: Animalia
- Phylum: Arthropoda
- Class: Insecta
- Order: Lepidoptera
- Family: Nymphalidae
- Genus: Neptis
- Species: N. puella

Binomial name
- Neptis puella Aurivillius, 1894

Synonyms
- Neptis lucayensis Schultze, 1916

= Neptis puella =

Species of butterfly

Neptis puella, the little sailer, is a butterfly in the family Nymphalidae. It is found in Sierra Leone, Ivory Coast, Ghana, Togo, Nigeria, Cameroon, the Democratic Republic of Congo, Uganda, western Kenya, western Tanzania and north-western Zambia. The habitat consists of Cryptosepalum woodland.

N. puella Auriv. has an expanse of 34—37 mm. and only differs from nysiades in discal spots 2—8 on the forewing forming a completely continuous transverse band with the proximal boundary nearly straight and the distal arcuate; the first marginal line of the forewing is deeply bent proximad in 1 b, but not sharply angled; the median band of the hindwing moderately broad, narrowed towards the inner margin. Cameroons and Congo. — nina Stgr. seems to be the eastern race. Images BOLD
