= Neptis loma =

Scientific classification
- Kingdom: Animalia
- Phylum: Arthropoda
- Class: Insecta
- Order: Lepidoptera
- Family: Nymphalidae
- Genus: Neptis
- Species: N. loma

Binomial name
- Neptis loma Condamin, 1971

Species of butterfly

Neptis loma, the Loma sailer, is a butterfly in the family Nymphalidae. It is found in Sierra Leone, Ivory Coast, Ghana (the Volta Region) and Nigeria. The habitat consists of forests.

== Taxonomy ==
It is a member of the Neptis agatha species group
