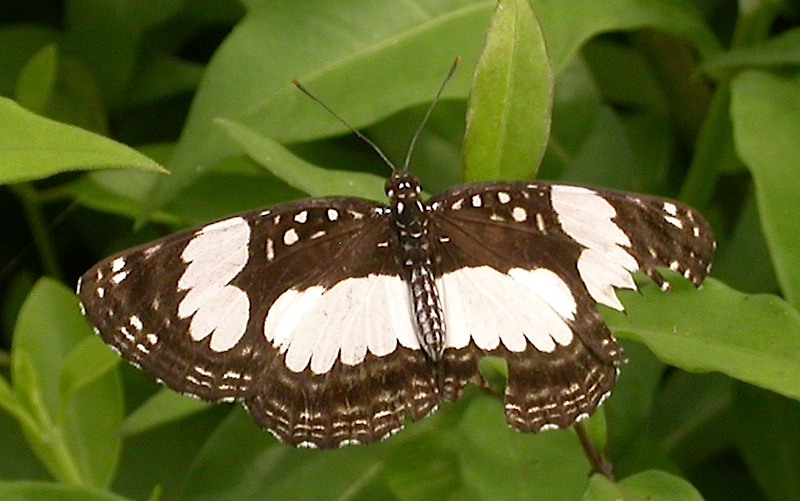

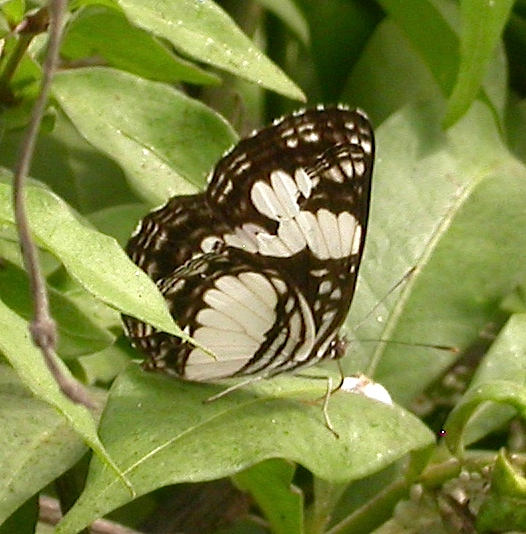

Scientific classification
- Kingdom: Animalia
- Phylum: Arthropoda
- Clade: Pancrustacea
- Class: Insecta
- Order: Lepidoptera
- Family: Nymphalidae
- Genus: Neptis
- Species: N. morosa

Binomial name
- Neptis morosa Overlaet, 1955

= Neptis morosa =

Species of butterfly

Neptis morosa, the savanna sailer or morose sailer, is a butterfly in the family Nymphalidae. It is found in Senegal, Guinea, Sierra Leone, Ivory Coast, Ghana, Togo, Benin, Nigeria, Cameroon, Gabon, the Republic of the Congo, the Central African Republic, Angola, the eastern part of the Democratic Republic of the Congo, Uganda, Burundi, western Kenya and north-western Tanzania. The habitat consists of moist areas and forest margins.

Torben Larsen developed a species numbering system for his 2005 publication Butterflies of West Africa. This species is #907. The 'Larsen' numbers have since been used with permission in A Sharp Eye on Butterflies of Ghana.

== Taxonomy ==
It is a member of the Neptis agatha species group
