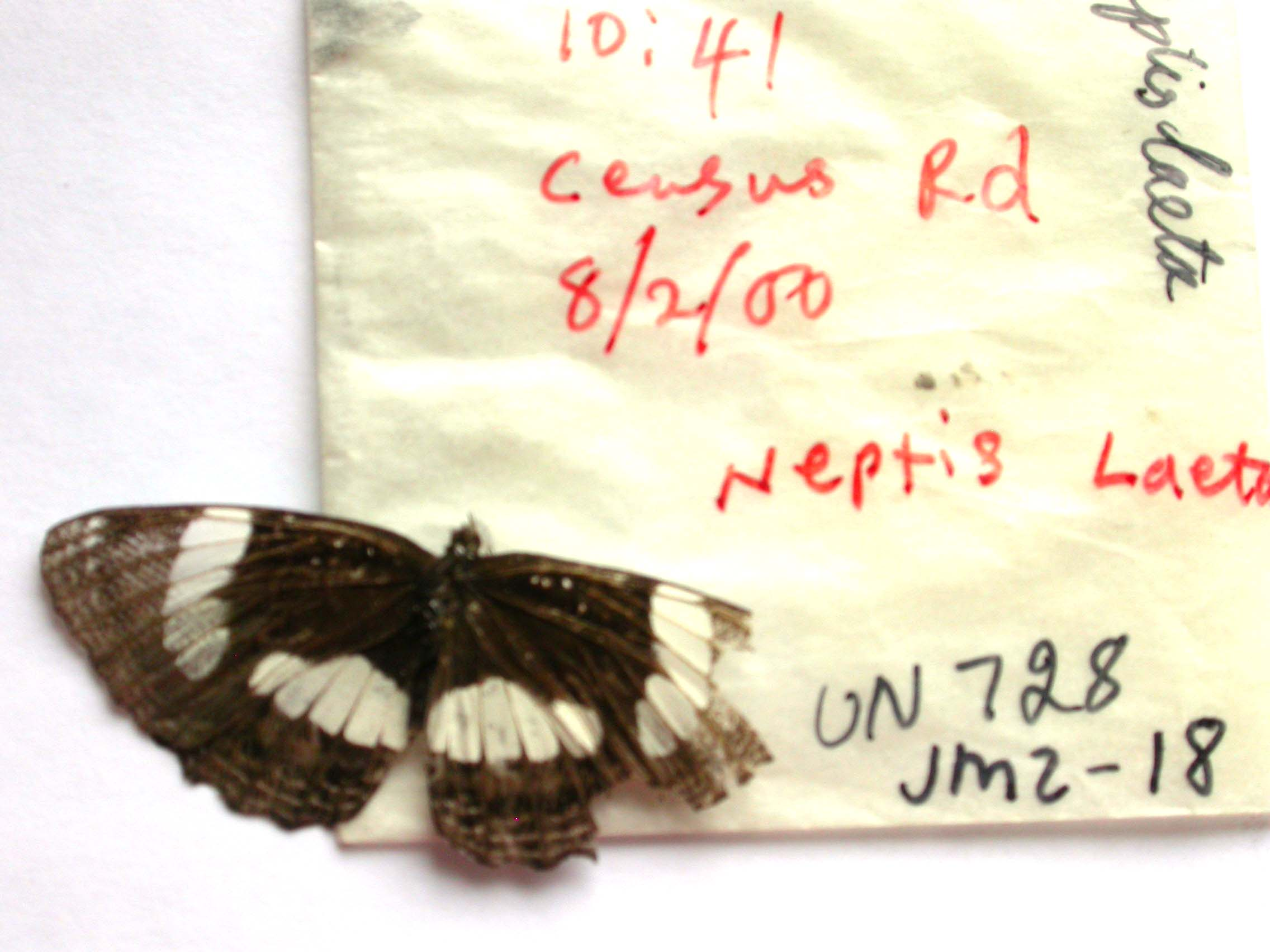
- Neptis laeta

Scientific classification
- Kingdom: Animalia
- Phylum: Arthropoda
- Class: Insecta
- Order: Lepidoptera
- Family: Nymphalidae
- Genus: Neptis
- Species: N. laeta

Binomial name
- Neptis laeta Overlaet, 1955

Synonyms
- Neptis roberti Eltringham, 1929

= Neptis laeta =

Common sailer

Species of butterfly

Neptis laeta, the common sailer or albizia sailer, is a butterfly of the family Nymphalidae. It is found in Sub-Saharan Africa. The habitat consists of forests and woodland.

Its wingspan is 40–48 mm in males and 45–52 mm in females. Adults are on the wing year round with peak from December to May.

The larvae feed on Dalbergia obovata, Dalbergia armata, Albizia adianthifolia, and Acalypha species.

== Taxonomy ==
It is a member of the Neptis agatha species group.
