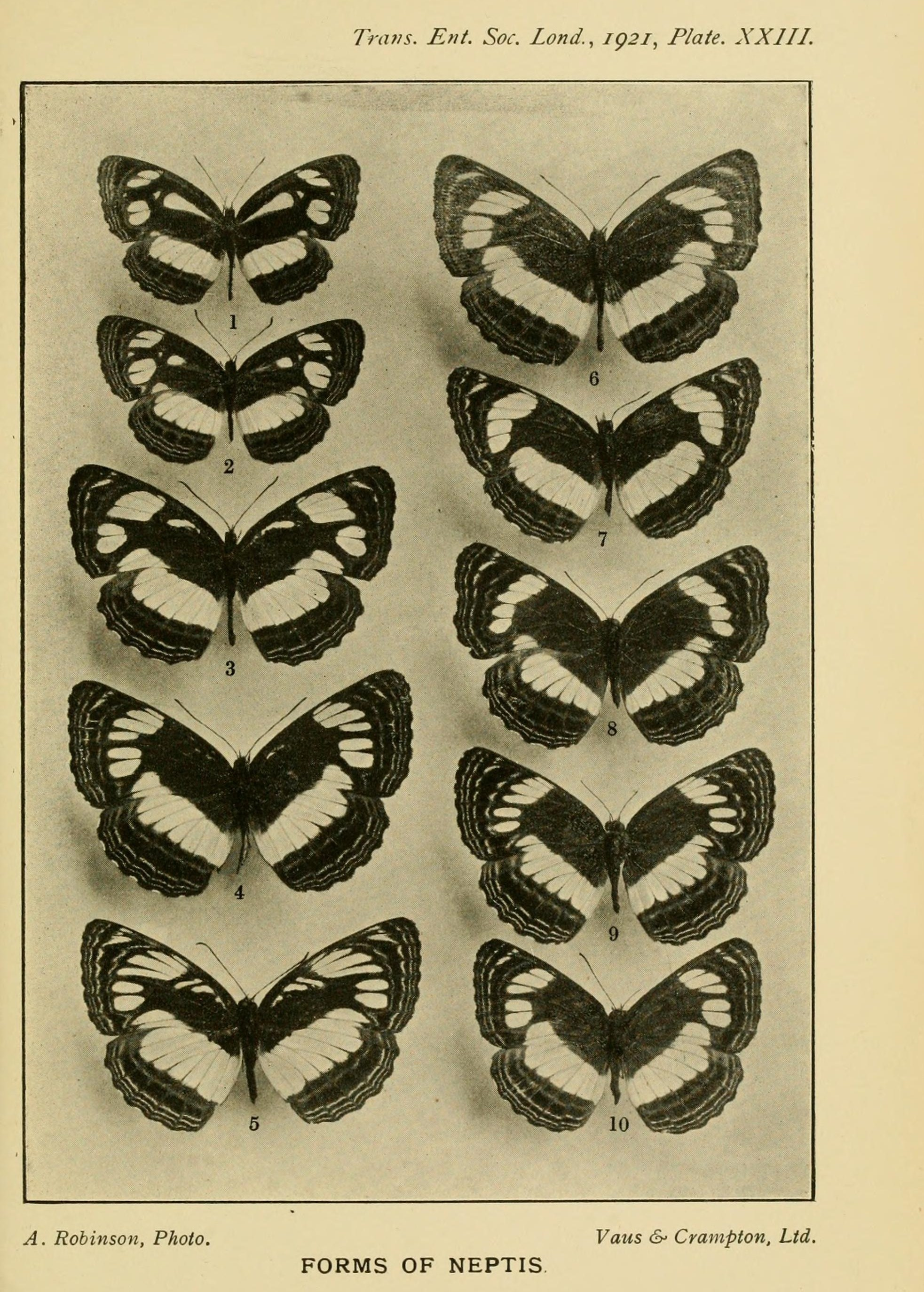
- Figure 3 male

Scientific classification
- Kingdom: Animalia
- Phylum: Arthropoda
- Class: Insecta
- Order: Lepidoptera
- Family: Nymphalidae
- Genus: Neptis
- Species: N. strigata

Binomial name
- Neptis strigata Aurivillius, 1894

Synonyms
- Neptis biafra var. strigata Aurivillius, 1894

= Neptis strigata =

Species of butterfly

Neptis strigata, the strigate sailer, is a butterfly in the family Nymphalidae. It is found in Ivory Coast, Ghana, Nigeria, Cameroon, the Republic of the Congo, the Central African Republic, the Democratic Republic of the Congo, Uganda, Rwanda, Kenya and Tanzania. The habitat consists of dense forests.

The larvae feed on Clerodendrum capitatum.

== Subspecies ==
- Neptis strigata strigata (Ivory Coast, Ghana, Nigeria, Cameroon, Congo, Central African Republic, Democratic Republic of the Congo)
- Neptis strigata kakamega Collins & Larsen, 1996 (Democratic Republic of the Congo: Kivu, Uganda, Rwanda, western Kenya, north-western Tanzania)

== Taxonomy ==
It is a member of the Neptis agatha species group' N. strigata Auriv. (48 e) only differs from nicomedes in its larger size, 45—47 mm., and in having the discal band of the forewing broadly interrupted at vein 4. Discal spots 2 and 3 on the forewing are more or less rounded and separate. Cameroons to Uganda. Images BOLD
