= Neptis vindo =

Scientific classification
- Kingdom: Animalia
- Phylum: Arthropoda
- Class: Insecta
- Order: Lepidoptera
- Family: Nymphalidae
- Genus: Neptis
- Species: N. vindo

Binomial name
- Neptis vindo Pierre-Baltus, 1978

Species of butterfly

Neptis vindo, or Claude's club-dot sailer, is a butterfly in the family Nymphalidae. It is found in Ivory Coast.

The larvae feed on Lasiodiscus species.

== Taxonomy ==
It is a member nicoteles sub-group Of the Neptis nysiades group (Species complex) sensu Richardson The members of the subgroup are

- Neptis nicoteles
- Neptis vindo
- Neptis mixophyes
