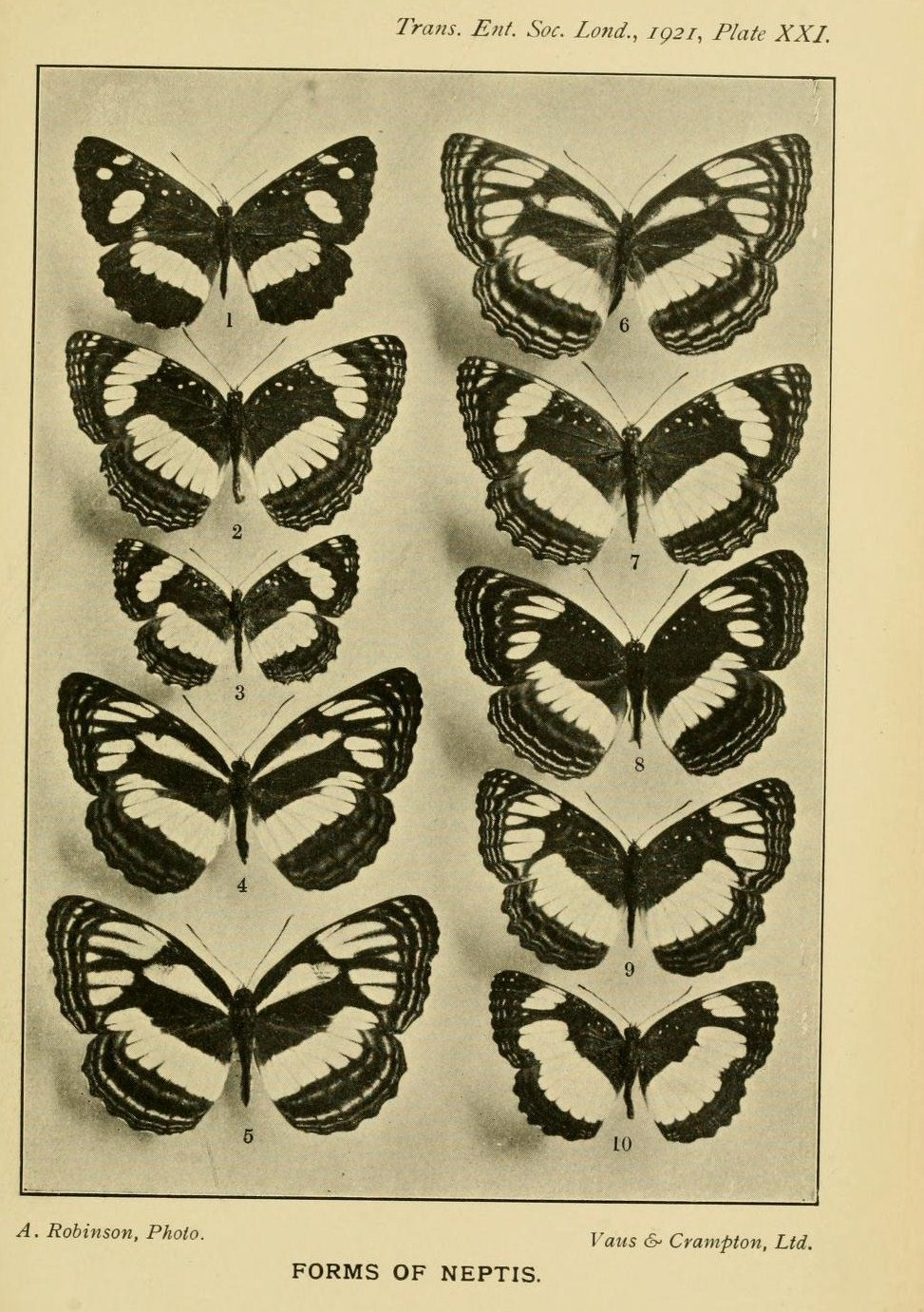
- Figure 6

Scientific classification
- Kingdom: Animalia
- Phylum: Arthropoda
- Class: Insecta
- Order: Lepidoptera
- Family: Nymphalidae
- Genus: Neptis
- Species: N. lermanni

Binomial name
- Neptis lermanni Aurivillius, 1896

Synonyms
- Neptis lermanni ab. magnifica Dufrane, 1933

= Neptis lermanni =

Species of butterfly

Neptis lermanni is a butterfly in the family Nymphalidae. It is found in the Democratic Republic of the Congo (Ubangi, Mongala, Uele, Tshopo, Equateur, Cataractes, Sankuru and Tanganika) and the Republic of the Congo.

== Description ==
N. lermanni Auriv. (48 f). Is larger than [ the closely related Neptis nicodice] - about 55 mm., and has an elongate discal spot at the costal margin of the forewing in cellule 9; longitudinal stripe on the cell of the forewing somewhat emarginate at its hindmargin and occasionally followed posteriorly by a small dull grey spot.Congo

== Taxonomy ==
It is a member of the Neptis melicerta Species group sensu Seitz
