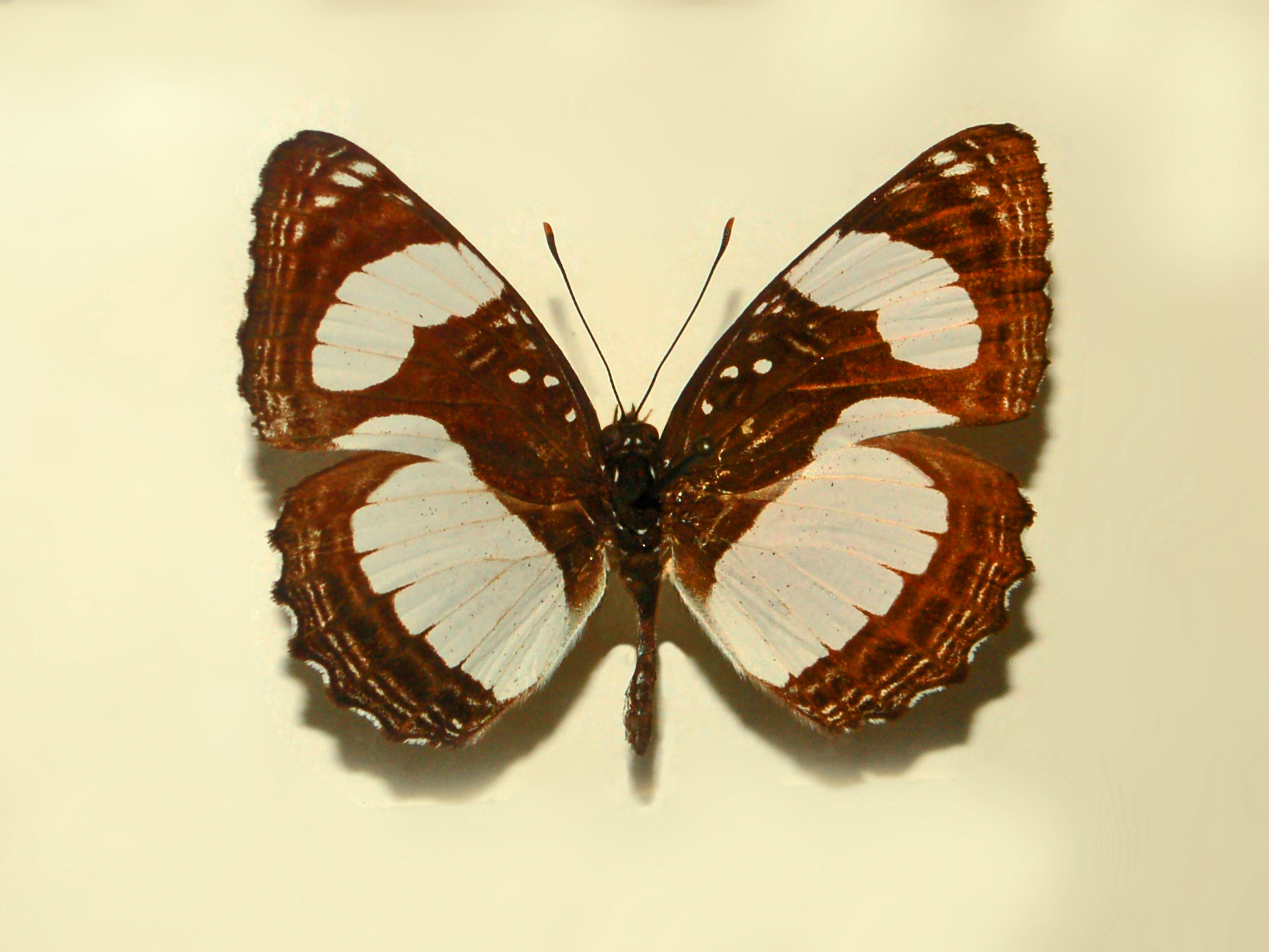
- From Eritrea

Scientific classification
- Kingdom: Animalia
- Phylum: Arthropoda
- Class: Insecta
- Order: Lepidoptera
- Family: Nymphalidae
- Genus: Neptis
- Species: N. nicomedes

Binomial name
- Neptis nicomedes Hewitson, 1874

Synonyms
- Neptis nicomedes f. puelloides Eltringham, 1922

= Neptis nicomedes =

Species of butterfly

Neptis nicomedes is a species of nymphalid butterfly.

== Description ==
Neptis nicomedes has a wingspan reaching about 40 millimetres (1.6 in). The uppersides of the wings are dark brown. Both wings are crossed in the middle by a broad band of white, followed by a band of indistinct grey spots and by three sub-marginal linear bands of white. The underside is similar to the upperside, but colours are paler.It is very similar to Neptis strigata. Images BOLD

== Distribution ==
This species can be found in tropical western Africa, mainly in Sierra Leone, Angola, Democratic Republic of the Congo, Uganda and western Kenya.

== Taxonomy ==
It is a member of the Neptis agatha species group and of the melicerta Species group. The members of the melicerta group are

- Neptis melicerta
- Neptis agouale
- Neptis carcassoni
- Neptis goochii
- Neptis nicomedes
- Neptis quintilla
- Neptis nicobule
- Neptis nina
