= Neptis gratiosa =

Scientific classification
- Kingdom: Animalia
- Phylum: Arthropoda
- Class: Insecta
- Order: Lepidoptera
- Family: Nymphalidae
- Genus: Neptis
- Species: N. gratiosa

Binomial name
- Neptis gratiosa Overlaet, 1955

Species of butterfly

Neptis gratiosa is a butterfly in the family Nymphalidae. It is found in Angola, the Democratic Republic of the Congo (Sankuru and Shaba), northern Zambia, Mozambique, north-western Tanzania and Kenya. The habitat consists of grassy woodland.

== Taxonomy ==
It is a member of the Neptis agatha species group
