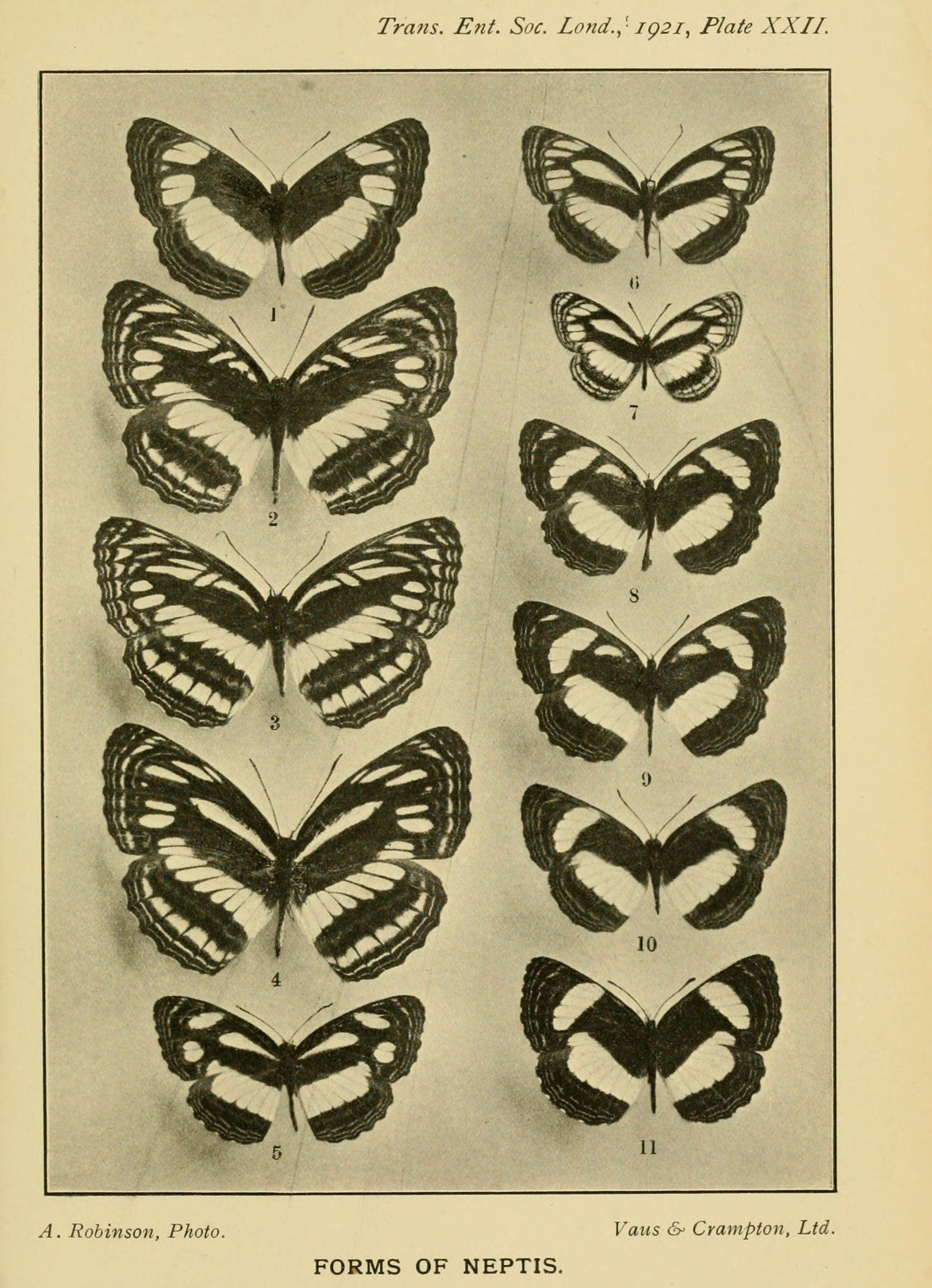
- Figure 10

Scientific classification
- Kingdom: Animalia
- Phylum: Arthropoda
- Clade: Pancrustacea
- Class: Insecta
- Order: Lepidoptera
- Family: Nymphalidae
- Genus: Neptis
- Species: N. quintilla

Binomial name
- Neptis quintilla Mabille, 1890

= Neptis quintilla =

Species of butterfly

Neptis quintilla, the angled petty sailer, is a butterfly in the family Nymphalidae. It is found in Guinea-Bissau, Guinea, Sierra Leone, Ivory Coast, Ghana, Nigeria, Cameroon, Angola, the Democratic Republic of the Congo, Uganda and western Kenya. The habitat consists of open areas in wet forests with a canopy cover.

The larvae feed on Acacia species.

Torben Larsen developed a species numbering system for his 2005 publication Butterflies of West Africa. This species is #922. The 'Larsen' numbers have since been used with permission in A Sharp Eye on Butterflies of Ghana.

== Taxonomy ==
It is a member of the melicerta Species group The members of the melicerta group are

- Neptis melicerta
- Neptis agouale
- Neptis carcassoni
- Neptis goochii
- Neptis nicomedes
- Neptis quintilla
- Neptis nicobule
- Neptis nina
