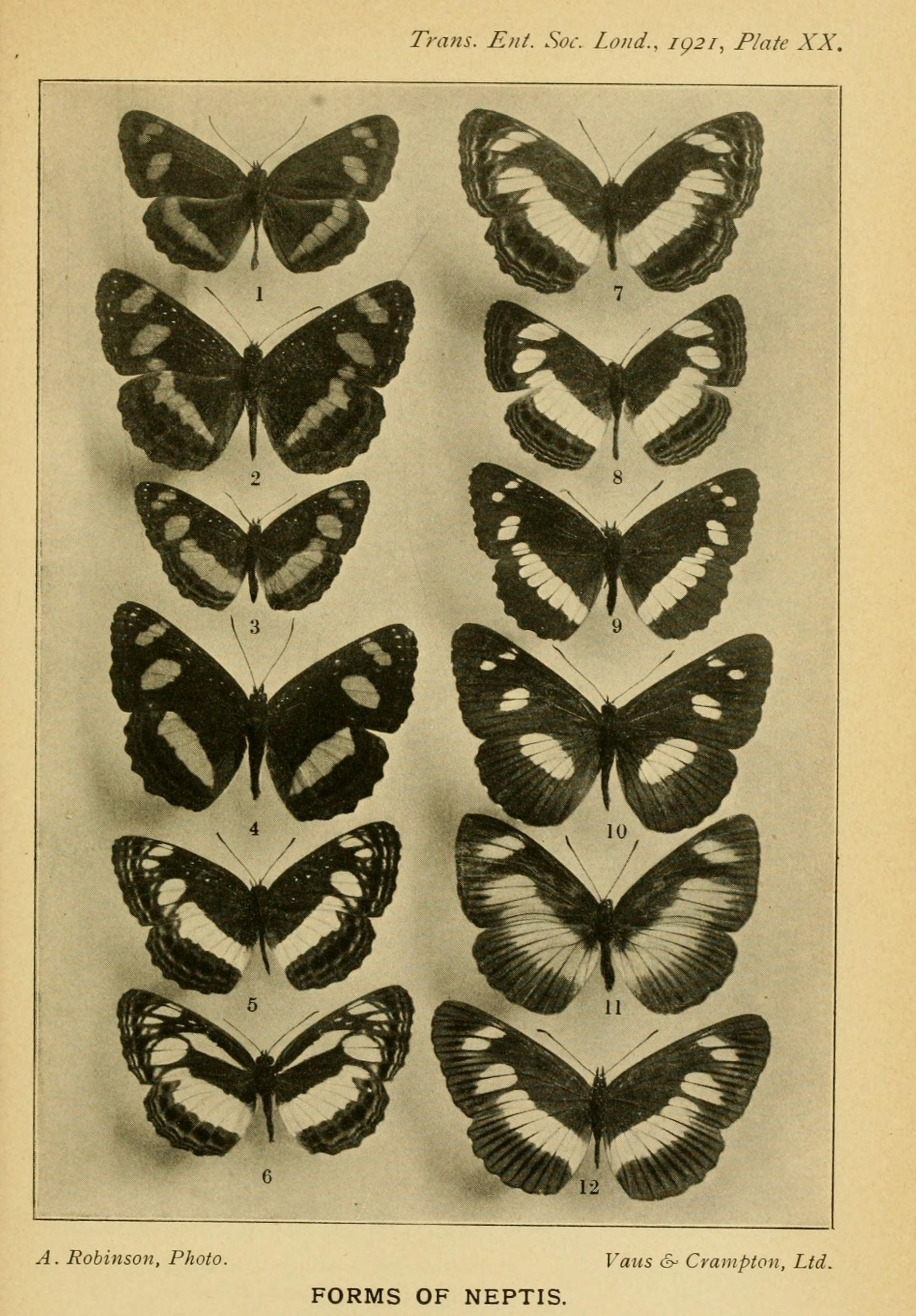
- Figure 8

Scientific classification
- Kingdom: Animalia
- Phylum: Arthropoda
- Class: Insecta
- Order: Lepidoptera
- Family: Nymphalidae
- Genus: Neptis
- Species: N. poultoni

Binomial name
- Neptis poultoni Eltringham, 1921

= Neptis poultoni =

Species of butterfly

Neptis poultoni is a butterfly in the family Nymphalidae. It is found in Uganda and the Democratic Republic of the Congo (Lomami and Lualaba).

The larvae feed on Clerodendron and Paullinia species.

== Taxonomy ==
It is a member of the Neptis agatha species group
