= Neptis nina =

Scientific classification
- Kingdom: Animalia
- Phylum: Arthropoda
- Class: Insecta
- Order: Lepidoptera
- Family: Nymphalidae
- Genus: Neptis
- Species: N. nina

Binomial name
- Neptis nina Staudinger, 1896

Species of butterfly

Neptis nina, the tiny sailer, is a butterfly in the family Nymphalidae. It is found in eastern Tanzania, south-eastern Kenya and north-eastern Zambia.Images BOLD The habitat consists of forests.

== Taxonomy ==
It is a member of the Neptis agatha species group and of the melicerta Species group The members of the melicerta group are

- Neptis melicerta
- Neptis agouale
- Neptis carcassoni
- Neptis goochii
- Neptis nicomedes
- Neptis quintilla
- Neptis nicobule
- Neptis nina

nina Stgr. seems to be the eastern race [ of Neptis puella] and only differs in having the transverse band of the forewing narrowed towards the costal margin and in the somewhat narrower median band of the hindwing.[then] German East Africa: Usagara.
