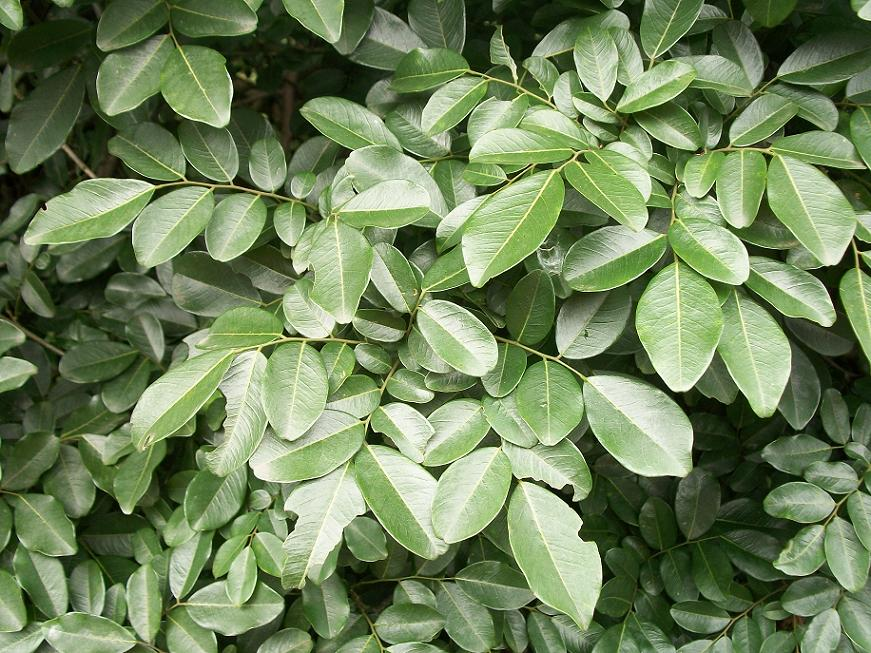
- Foliage of Dalbergia obovata

Conservation status
- Least Concern (IUCN 3.1)

Scientific classification
- Kingdom: Plantae
- Clade: Embryophytes
- Clade: Tracheophytes
- Clade: Spermatophytes
- Clade: Angiosperms
- Clade: Eudicots
- Clade: Rosids
- Order: Fabales
- Family: Fabaceae
- Subfamily: Faboideae
- Genus: Dalbergia
- Species: D. obovata

Binomial name
- Dalbergia obovata E.Mey.

Synonyms
- Homotypic Synonyms: Amerimnon obovatum (E.Mey.) Kuntze; Heterotypic Synonyms: Dalbergia sessiliflora Harms; Podiopetalum reticulatum Hochst.

= Dalbergia obovata =

Climbing flat bean

Species of legume

Dalbergia obovata is a species of flowering plant in the family Fabaceae. It is sometimes referred to by the common name climbing flat bean. It is a robust shrub or climber that is native to Southern Africa.

== Distribution ==
This species favours coastal and riverine forest and forest margins as well as wooded slopes, and deciduous woodland. It is found from the Eastern Cape, through KwaZulu-Natal and Mozambique to Tanzania.

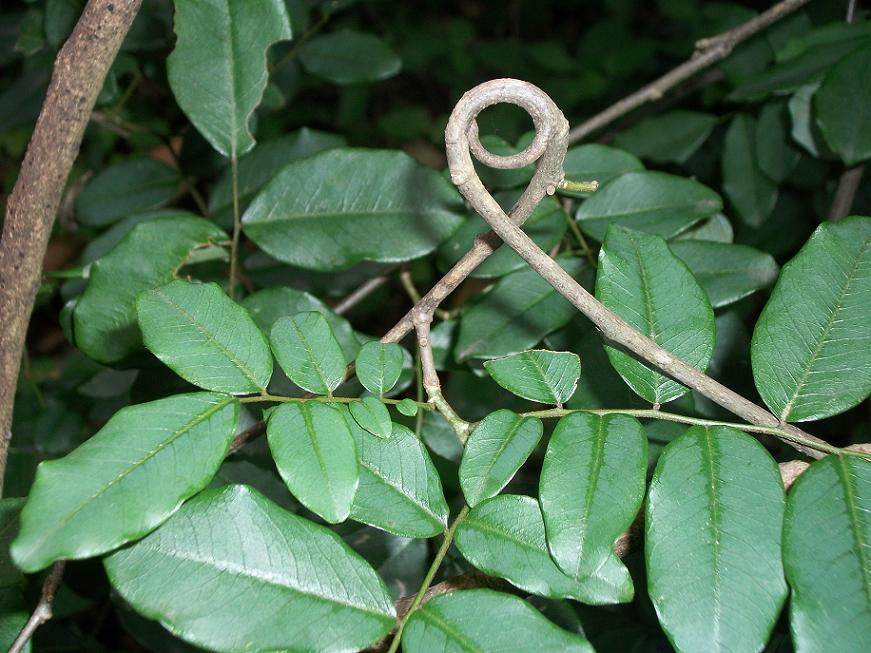
Leaves and branchlet of Dalbergia obovata

== Description ==
Dalbergia obovata is a canopy climber that grows up to 30 m tall in the wild or a small tree up to 6 m tall. It has modified, tendril-like branches that enable the plant to support itself on surrounding vegetation. The leaves are compound with alternate leaflets, and glossy green above and blue-grey beneath with a wavy margin. The flowers are produced in dense heads in the leaf axils and ends of the branchlets. The flowers are whitish and fragrant (sweetly scented). The fruits are flattened pods that are pale yellow to brown in colour, and form in clusters. Each pod contains 1-3 seeds.

== Taxonomic notes ==
There is some variation between East African plants and the typical South African form: The leaflet-apices of East African specimens are less frequently pointed, there are few lateral nerves, and the fruits are generally relatively narrower and less hairy. Some of the specimens from southern Mozambique show a cline towards the East African form, and so no formal taxonomic distinction seems necessary between Eastern and Southern African forms.

== Uses ==
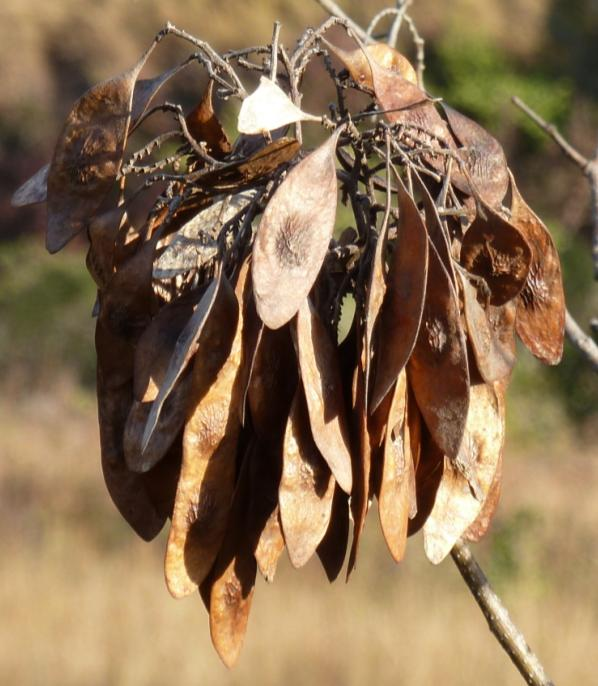
The flat seed pods

The stems are used for traditional woven hut walls and fishing baskets (in Maputaland). The heavy reddish wood is used for sticks and stools. A root infusion is used to treat stomach-ache and toothache, and the roots are used to make a Zulu love charm. The bark is used to treat sore mouths in babies and for making rope (twine), and ash from burnt bark is added to snuff. Dalbergia obovata is also used as a garden plant because of its showy flowers and can make an impenetrable hedge. The leaves can be used to feed livestock.

== Ecological significance ==
As a legume these plants fix nitrogen in the soil for other plants to use. Beetles and a wide variety of other insects are attracted to the flowers. The leaves are heavily browsed by game animals. Dalbergia obovata is an important foodplant for Dassies (hyrax). These plants also provide food for birds. The leaves of Dalbergia obovata were noted being used on a daily basis to line the nest of a pair of green malkohas (Ceuthmochares aereus) while the eggs were being incubated, but this ceased once the eggs hatched. There were no Dalbergia obovata in the immediate vicinity of the nest, and the birds had to fly some distance to find the leaf species of their choice for nest lining. Dalbergia obovata is also one of the larval foodplants of the common sailer (Neptis laeta).
