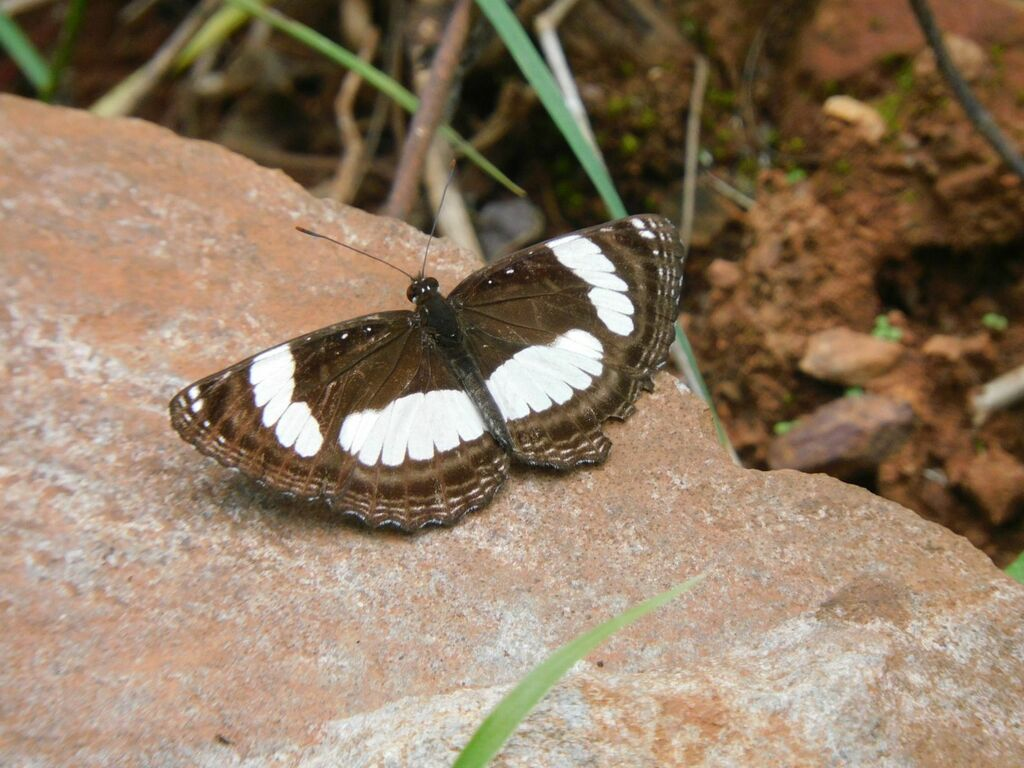

Scientific classification
- Kingdom: Animalia
- Phylum: Arthropoda
- Class: Insecta
- Order: Lepidoptera
- Family: Nymphalidae
- Genus: Neptis
- Species: N. kiriakoffi

Binomial name
- Neptis kiriakoffi Overlaet, 1955

Synonyms
- Neptis overlaeti Pennington, 1962

= Neptis kiriakoffi =

Kiriakoff's sailer

Species of butterfly

Neptis kiriakoffi, or Kiriakoff's sailer, is a butterfly of the family Nymphalidae. It is found in Sub-Saharan Africa. The habitat consists of forests and Brachystegia woodland.

Its wingspan is 40–48 mm in males and 45–52 mm in females. Adults are probably on the wing year round.

The larvae feed on Acalypha paniculata, Paullinia, Australina, and Pilea species.

== Taxonomy ==
It is a member of the Neptis agatha species group
