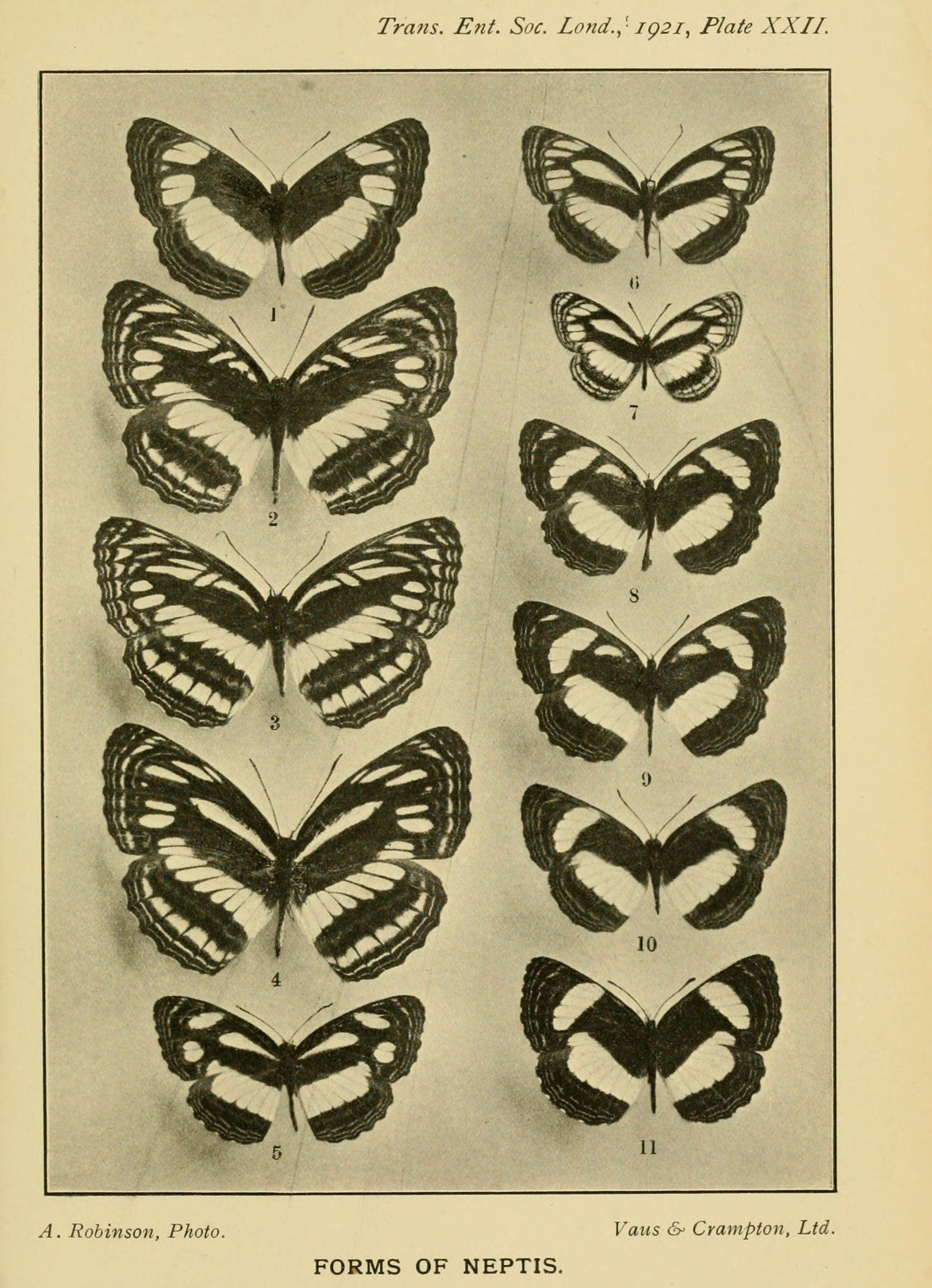
- Male, figure 8

Scientific classification
- Kingdom: Animalia
- Phylum: Arthropoda
- Class: Insecta
- Order: Lepidoptera
- Family: Nymphalidae
- Genus: Neptis
- Species: N. mixophyes

Binomial name
- Neptis mixophyes Holland, 1892

Synonyms
- Neptis nicodice Grünberg, 1910

= Neptis mixophyes =

Species of butterfly

Neptis mixophyes, or Holland's clubbed sailer, is a butterfly in the family Nymphalidae. It is found in eastern Sierra Leone, Ivory Coast, Ghana, Nigeria, Cameroon, Gabon, the Republic of the Congo, Equatorial Guinea and the Democratic Republic of the Congo. The habitat consists of wetter forests.

== Description ==
N. nicodice Grunb. only differs from Neptis nicobule in having the marginal lines continuous and only interrupted by the veins and discal spots 5 and 6 on the forewing elongate and not oval. The longitudinal stripe in the cell of the forewing is wedge-shaped and the discal band of the hindwing 4.5 mm. in breadth.Hindwing above only with 3 marginal lines. Expanse 48 mm. Spanish Guinea

The larvae feed on Dalhousiea africana and Petersianthus species.

== Taxonomy ==
It is a member of the Neptis melicerta Species group sensu Seitz

It is a member nicoteles sub-group Of the Neptis nysiades group (Species complex) sensu Richardson The members of the subgroup are

- Neptis nicoteles
- Neptis vindo
- Neptis mixophyes
