= Neptis carcassoni =

Scientific classification
- Kingdom: Animalia
- Phylum: Arthropoda
- Class: Insecta
- Order: Lepidoptera
- Family: Nymphalidae
- Genus: Neptis
- Species: N. carcassoni

Binomial name
- Neptis carcassoni van Son, 1959

Synonyms
- Neptis melicerta carcassoni van Son, 1959

Species of butterfly

Neptis carcassoni, or Carcasson's sailer, is a butterfly in the family Nymphalidae. It is found in Tanzania, Malawi, Zambia, Mozambique and eastern Zimbabwe. The habitat consists of lowland forests.

Adults are on wing nearly year round.

The larvae feed on Dalbergia lactea.

- Images BOLD

It was first described as a subspecies of Neptis melicerta. and It is a member of the melicerta Species group The members of the melicerta group are

- Neptis melicerta
- Neptis agouale
- Neptis carcassoni
- Neptis goochii
- Neptis nicomedes
- Neptis quintilla
- Neptis nicobule
- Neptis nina
