= Neptis katama =

Scientific classification
- Kingdom: Animalia
- Phylum: Arthropoda
- Class: Insecta
- Order: Lepidoptera
- Family: Nymphalidae
- Genus: Neptis
- Species: N. katama

Binomial name
- Neptis katama Collins & Larsen, 1991

Species of butterfly

Neptis katama is a butterfly in the family Nymphalidae. It is found in Kenya (the Aberdare Range and Nyambeni Hills).

== Taxonomy ==
It is a member of the Neptis agatha species group but also considered a member of the constantiae group. Images BOLD
