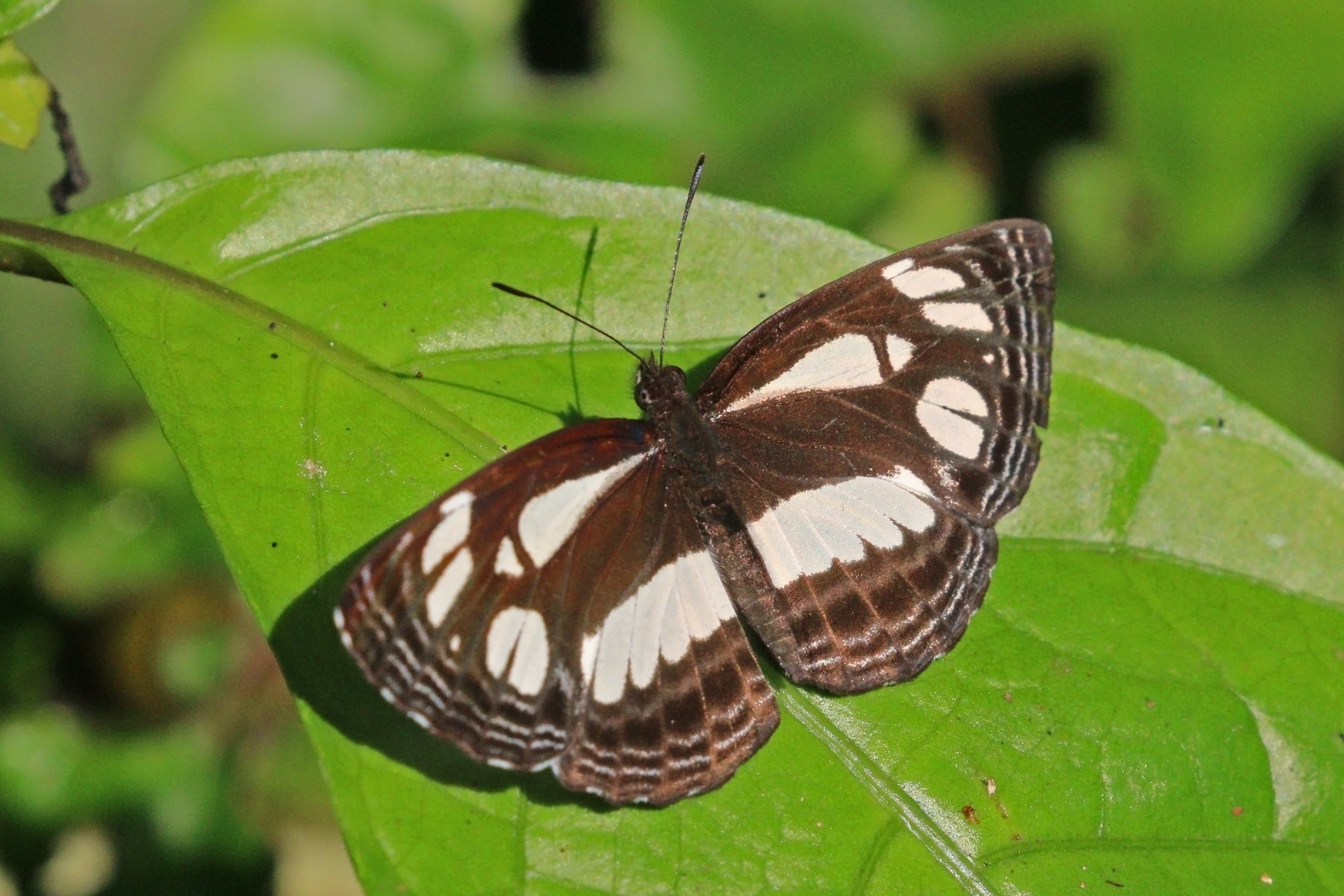
- Kibale National Park, Uganda

Scientific classification
- Kingdom: Animalia
- Phylum: Arthropoda
- Class: Insecta
- Order: Lepidoptera
- Family: Nymphalidae
- Genus: Neptis
- Species: N. agouale

Binomial name
- Neptis agouale Pierre-Baltus, 1978

Synonyms
- Neptis agonale

= Neptis agouale =

Species of butterfly

Neptis agouale, the common club-dot sailer , is a butterfly in the family Nymphalidae. It is found in Senegal, Guinea-Bissau, Sierra Leone, Liberia, Ivory Coast, Ghana, Togo, Nigeria, Cameroon, Gabon, the Republic of the Congo, the Democratic Republic of the Congo, Ethiopia, Kenya, Uganda, Rwanda, Tanzania and Zambia. The habitat consists of forest.

The larvae feed on Acacia (including Acacia pennata) and Ventilago species, as well as Pterocarpus santalinoides, Baphia pubescens, Grewia carpinifolia and Sterculia tragacantha.

== Subspecies ==
- Neptis agouale agouale (Senegal, Guinea-Bissau, Sierra Leone, Liberia, Ivory Coast, Ghana, Togo, Nigeria, Cameroon, Gabon, Congo, Democratic Republic of the Congo, western Tanzania, Zambia)
- Neptis agouale parallela Collins & Larsen, 1996 (Democratic Republic of the Congo: Kivu, eastern Uganda, Ethiopia, western Kenya, Rwanda, north-western Tanzania)

== Taxonomy ==
It is a member of the melicerta Species group The members of the melicerta group are

- Neptis melicerta
- Neptis agouale
- Neptis carcassoni
- Neptis goochii
- Neptis nicomedes
- Neptis quintilla
- Neptis nicobule
- Neptis nina
