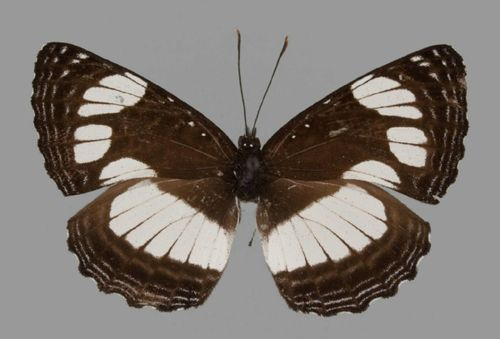

Scientific classification
- Kingdom: Animalia
- Phylum: Arthropoda
- Class: Insecta
- Order: Lepidoptera
- Family: Nymphalidae
- Genus: Neptis
- Species: N. constantiae

Binomial name
- Neptis constantiae Carcasson, 1961

= Neptis constantiae =

Species of butterfly

Neptis constantiae, or Constance's sailer, is a butterfly in the family Nymphalidae. It is found in Nigeria, Cameroon, the Democratic Republic of the Congo, Uganda, Kenya and Tanzania. The habitat consists of forests.

== Subspecies ==
- Neptis constantiae constantiae (Uganda, western Kenya, north-western Tanzania)
- Neptis constantiae kaumba Condamin, 1966 (Nigeria, Cameroon, Democratic Republic of the Congo: Lualaba and Sankuru)
- Images BOLD

== Taxonomy ==
It is a member of the Neptis agatha species group but also considered a member of the constantiae. group the other member being Neptis katama'.
