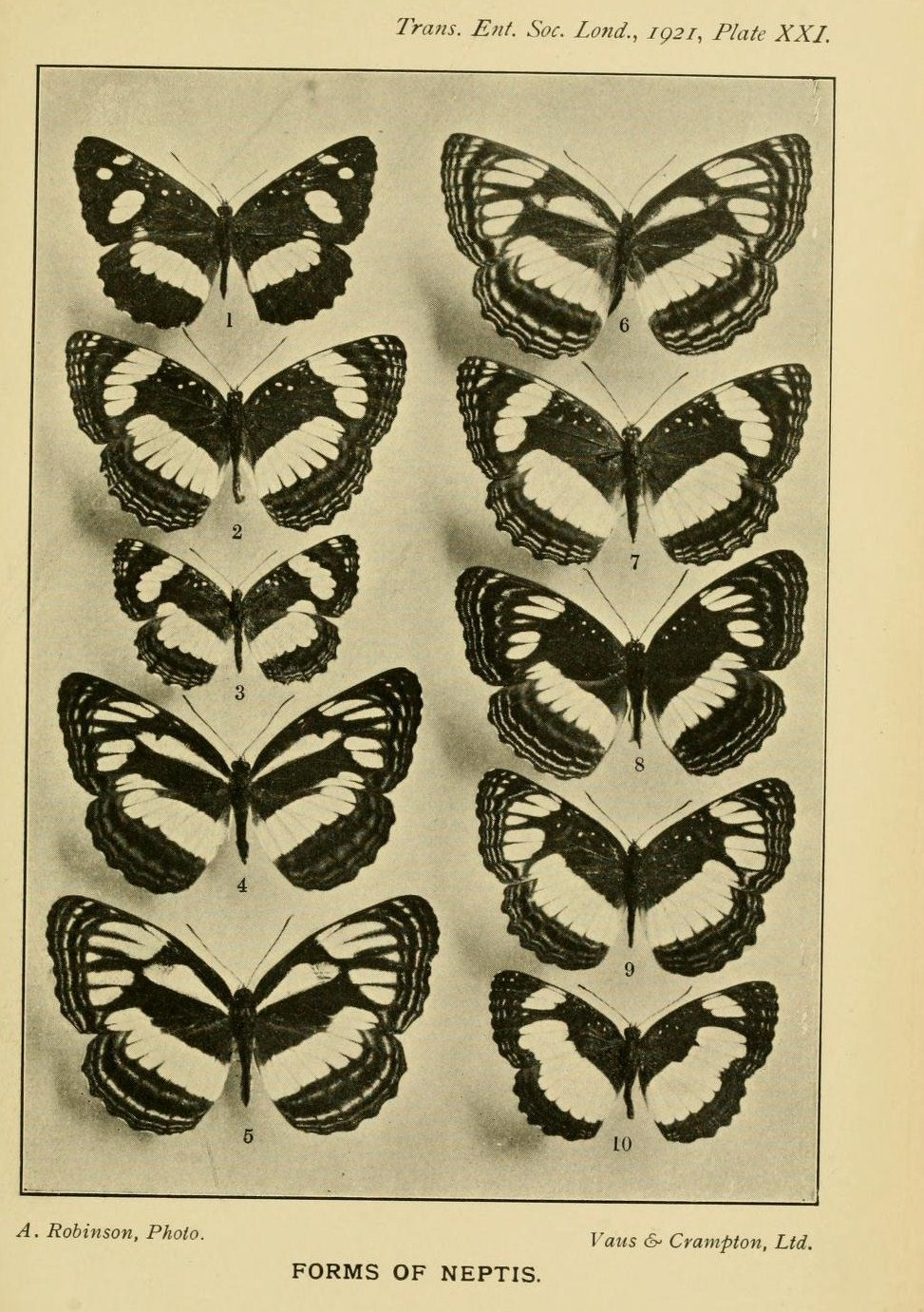
- Figure 4

Scientific classification
- Kingdom: Animalia
- Phylum: Arthropoda
- Class: Insecta
- Order: Lepidoptera
- Family: Nymphalidae
- Genus: Neptis
- Species: N. nebrodes

Binomial name
- Neptis nebrodes Hewitson, 1874

= Neptis nebrodes =

Species of butterfly

Neptis nebrodes, the broken-club sailer, is a butterfly in the family Nymphalidae. It is found in Sierra Leone, Liberia, Ivory Coast, Ghana, Nigeria, Cameroon, Gabon, the Republic of the Congo, Angola, the Democratic Republic of the Congo (Mayumbe) and possibly Guinea.

== Description ==
The longitudinal streak in the cell of the forewing narrow, pointed at the end, and before the end deeply incised on the anterior side; discal spot 4 on the foreAving small and triangular, placed free; discal spots 5 and 6 elongate and separated; median band of the hindwing anteriorly somewhat narrowed; marginal lines dull and indistinct; expanse about 54 mm. Togoland to Angola; rareImages BOLD

== Biology ==
The habitat consists of forests.

Adult males mud-puddle.

== Taxonomy ==
It is a member of the Neptis melicerta Species group sensu Seitz
