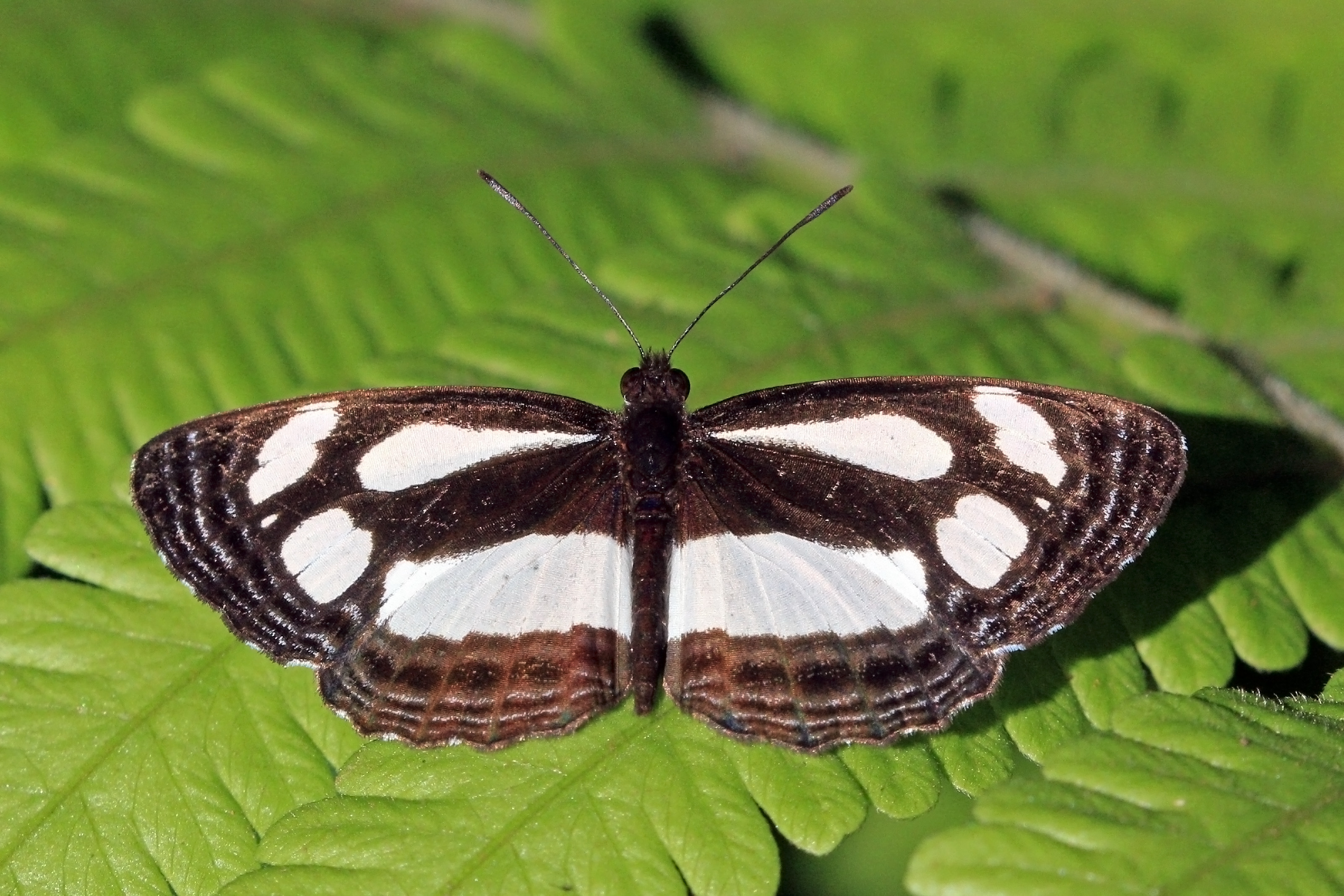

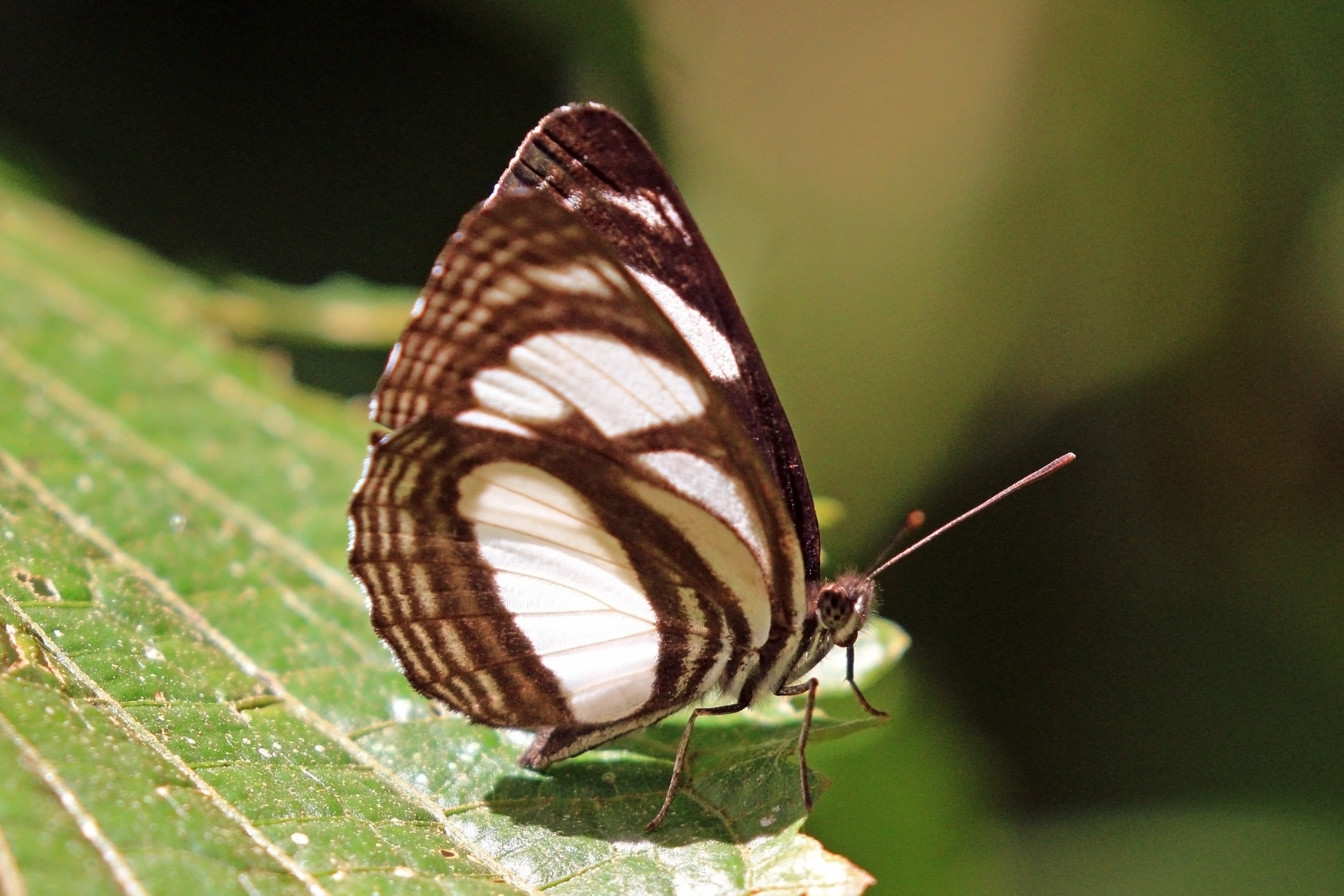
- Both in Kakamega Forest, Kenya

Scientific classification
- Kingdom: Animalia
- Phylum: Arthropoda
- Clade: Pancrustacea
- Class: Insecta
- Order: Lepidoptera
- Family: Nymphalidae
- Genus: Neptis
- Species: N. nicoteles

Binomial name
- Neptis nicoteles Hewitson, 1874

= Neptis nicoteles =

Species of butterfly

Neptis nicoteles, the clubbed sailer, is a butterfly in the family Nymphalidae. It is found in Sierra Leone, Liberia, Ivory Coast, Ghana, Nigeria, Cameroon, Gabon, the Republic of the Congo, Angola, the Democratic Republic of the Congo, Uganda, western Kenya, western Tanzania and north-western Zambia. The habitat consists of various types of forests, including secondary habitats.

The larvae feed on Millettia species.

Torben Larsen developed a species numbering system for his 2005 publication Butterflies of West Africa. This species is #929. The 'Larsen' numbers have since been used with permission in A Sharp Eye on Butterflies of Ghana.

== Taxonomy ==
It is a member of the Neptis agatha species group. Discal spot-4 on the forewing is long but very narrow, is placed close to vein 5 and forms with spots 5 and 6 a continuous subapical band; in this the species differs from all [nearly related species]. The longitudinal streak in the cell obtusely rounded at the end. Hindwing beneath only with two distinct white basal bands. Gold Coast to Angola. Images BOLD

It is the nominotypical member nicoteles sub-group Of the Neptis nysiades group (Species complex) sensu Richardson The members of the subgroup are

- Neptis nicoteles
- Neptis vindo
- Neptis mixophyes
