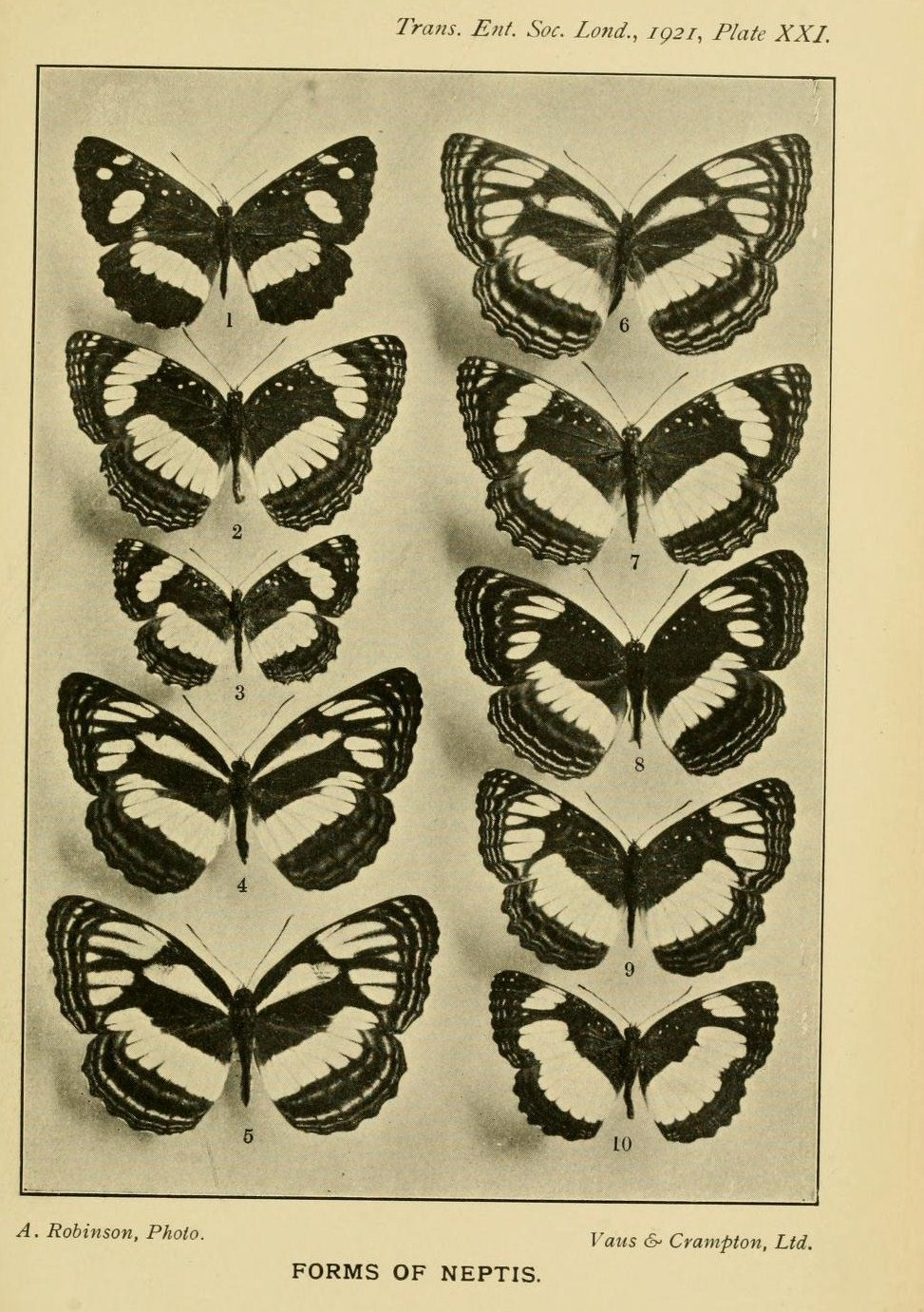
- Figure 5

Scientific classification
- Kingdom: Animalia
- Phylum: Arthropoda
- Clade: Pancrustacea
- Class: Insecta
- Order: Lepidoptera
- Family: Nymphalidae
- Genus: Neptis
- Species: N. jamesoni

Binomial name
- Neptis jamesoni Godman & Salvin, 1890

= Neptis jamesoni =

Species of butterfly

Neptis jamesoni, or Jameson's large sailer, is a butterfly in the family Nymphalidae. It is found in Nigeria (the Cross River loop), Cameroon, the Republic of the Congo, the Central African Republic and the Democratic Republic of the Congo.

N. jamesoni Godm. (48 f) differs from all the other Neptis species in that the longitudinal stripe in the cell of the forewing fills up the cell to the anterior margin and is blue-grey in its distal part. A large species, expanding about 60 mm.; discal spots 5 and 6 on the forewing are very long and narrow and distally divergent, discal spot 2 is rounded and much shorter than the spot in 3, which is of the same breadth; discal band of the hindwing about 5mm. in breadth and distally deeply incised at the veins; the second marginal line is much thickened beneath. Cameroons and Congo region/ BOLD images

== Taxonomy ==
It is a member of the Neptis melicerta Species group sensu Seitz
