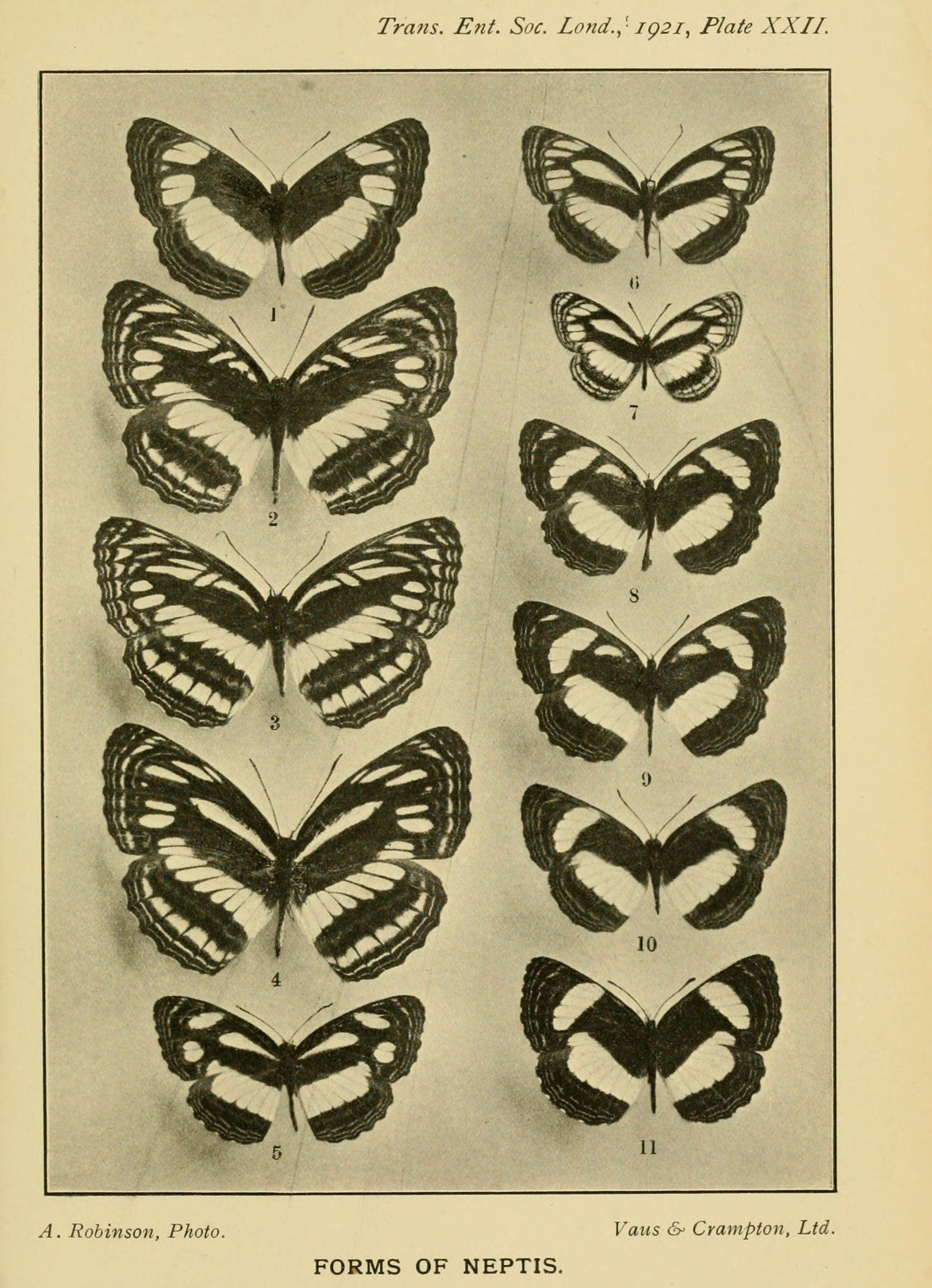
- Male, figure 7

Scientific classification
- Kingdom: Animalia
- Phylum: Arthropoda
- Clade: Pancrustacea
- Class: Insecta
- Order: Lepidoptera
- Family: Nymphalidae
- Genus: Neptis
- Species: N. nicobule

Binomial name
- Neptis nicobule Holland, 1892

= Neptis nicobule =

Species of butterfly

Neptis nicobule, the scarce clubbed sailer, is a butterfly in the family Nymphalidae. It is found in Sierra Leone, Liberia, Ivory Coast, Ghana, Nigeria, Cameroon, Gabon, the Republic of the Congo, the Central African Republic, the Democratic Republic of the Congo (Uele and Lualaba), Uganda, western Kenya and north-western Tanzania. The habitat consists of wet forests.

== Description ==
The discal spot 4 on the forewing is very small, triangular and stands quite free near to the first marginal line; the longitudinal streak in the cell obtusely rounded at the end; the marginal lines of the forewing indistinct or absent in the anterior part of cellule 3; discal spots 5 and 6 on the forewing small and rounded, not larger than spots 2 and 3; expanse 43–45 mm. Ogowe and Ubangi.Images BOLD

== Biology ==
The larvae feed on Cnestis ferruginea, Tetrapleura and Swartzia species.

== Taxonomy ==
It is a member of the Neptis melicerta Species group sensu Seitz

It is a member of the Neptis agatha species group and of the melicerta Species group The members of the melicerta group are

- Neptis melicerta
- Neptis agouale
- Neptis carcassoni
- Neptis goochii
- Neptis nicomedes
- Neptis quintilla
- Neptis nicobule
- Neptis nina
