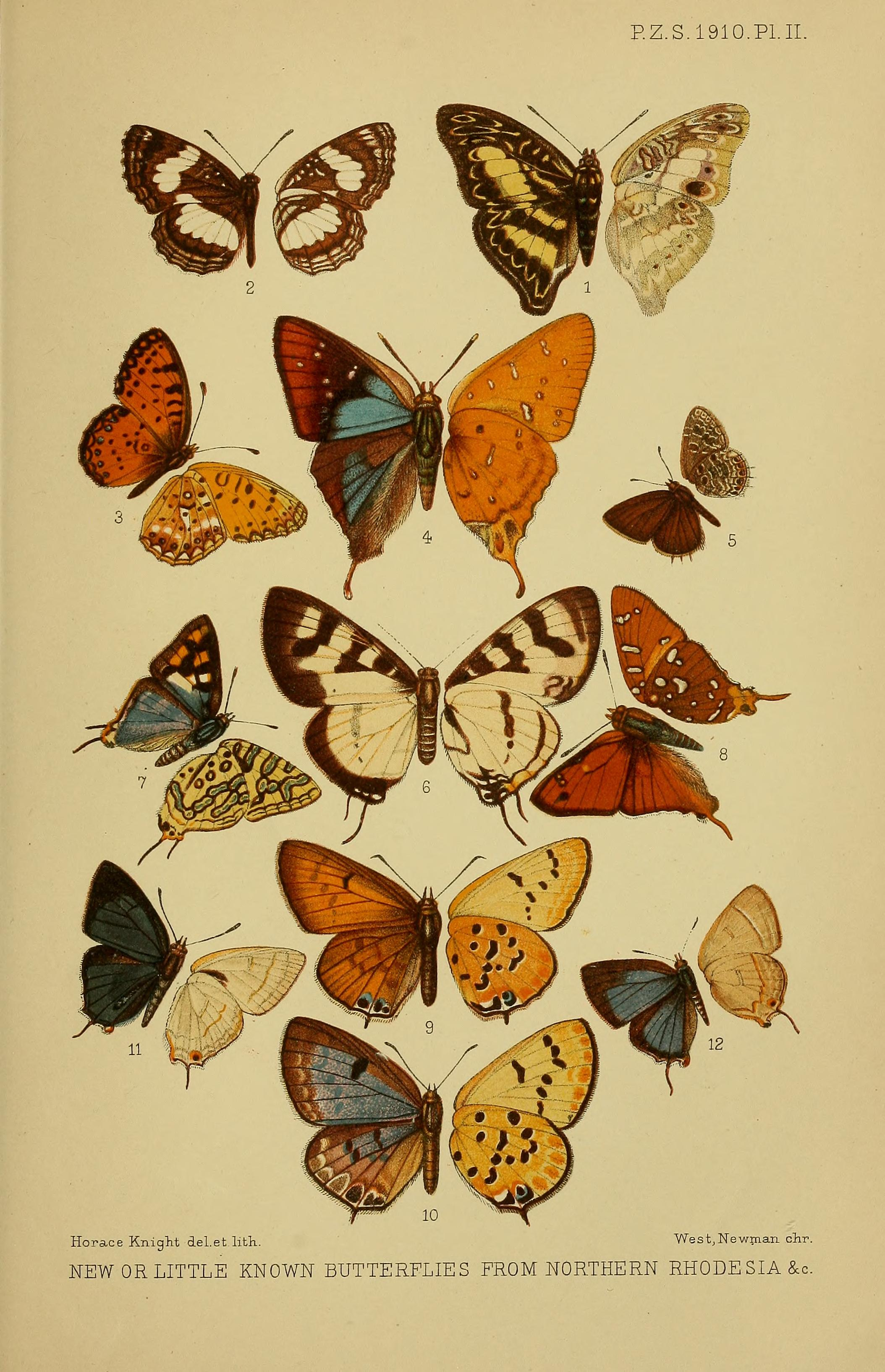
- Figure 1

Scientific classification
- Kingdom: Animalia
- Phylum: Arthropoda
- Class: Insecta
- Order: Lepidoptera
- Family: Nymphalidae
- Genus: Neptis
- Species: N. jordani

Binomial name
- Neptis jordani Neave, 1910

= Neptis jordani =

Jordan's sailer

Species of butterfly

Neptis jordani, or Jordan's sailer, is a butterfly of the family Nymphalidae. It is found in Sub-Saharan Africa. The habitat consists of areas near rivers and grassy marshes.

The wingspan is 38–42 mm in males and 44–45 mm in females. A detailed description would follow so closely that of agatha that it would seem of more use to state as fully as possible the directions In general appearance the ground-colour is browner than agatha. The f.-w. discal band is very complete and shows no blackening at the nervules. In practically every case the white spot in area 4 is longer than that in area 5, whereas in agatha 4 is generally shorter than 5. In jordani the white in 6 is so markedly shorter than that in 5 that the whole band has a narrowed appearance towards the costa, an effect much less apparent in agatha. The distal margin of the discal band from nervule 4 to the costa presents on the whole a straight or even concave line, whereas in agatha such margin is convex. In the hind wing the white of the discal band projects outwardly between the nervules, especially in 4 and 5, and the ends of such projections are well rounded. In agatha the ends of the component white spots are generally cut off nearly straight, and they are not liable to so prominent a projection in 4 and 5. This feature is perhaps even more evident on the underside.

Adults are probably on the wing year round.

The larvae feed on Polygonum strigonum.

== Taxonomy ==
It is a member of the Neptis agatha species group
