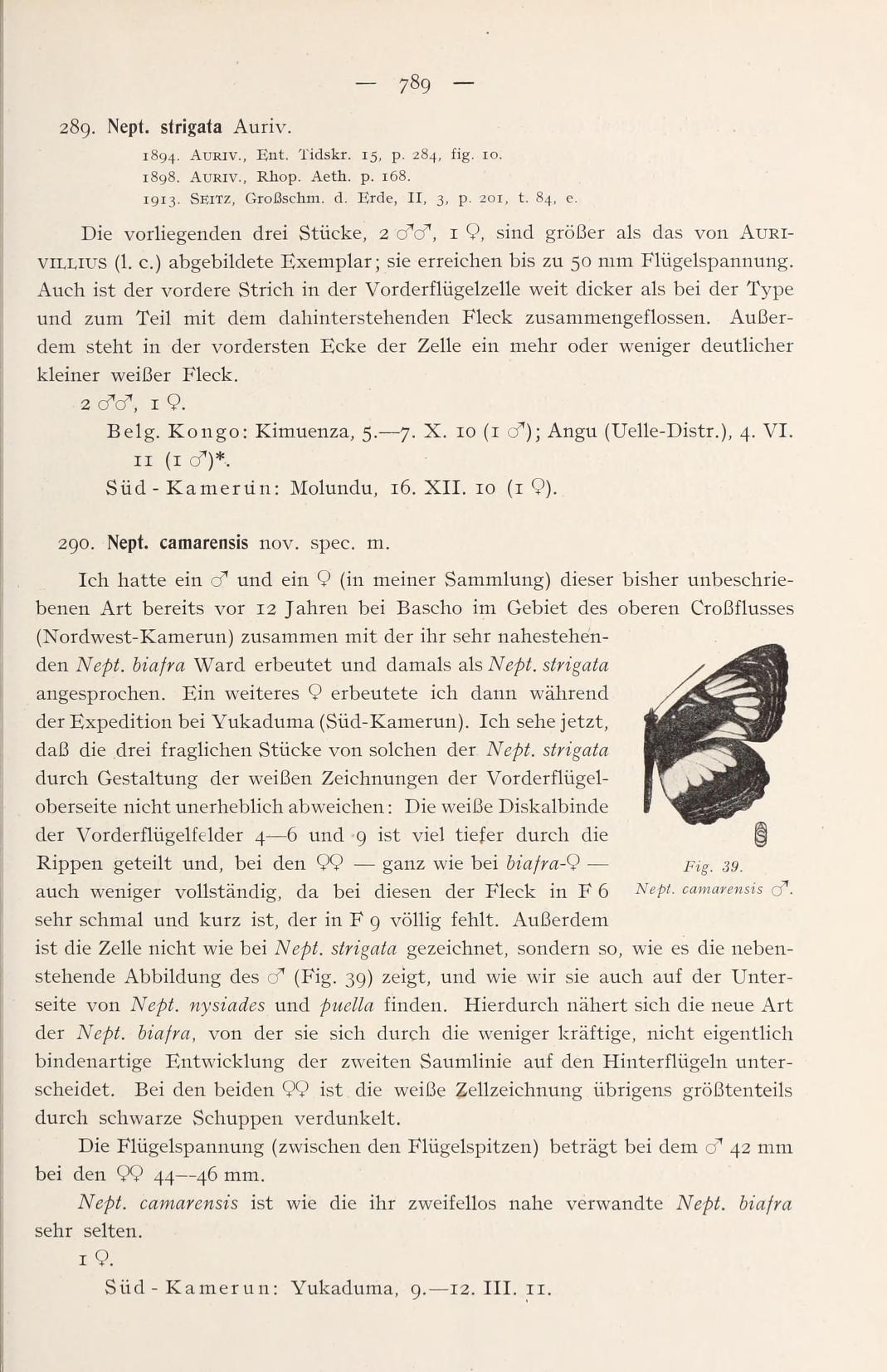
- Original descriptionĒ

Scientific classification
- Kingdom: Animalia
- Phylum: Arthropoda
- Class: Insecta
- Order: Lepidoptera
- Family: Nymphalidae
- Genus: Neptis
- Species: N. camarensis

Binomial name
- Neptis camarensis Schultze, 1920

= Neptis camarensis =

Species of butterfly

Neptis camarensis, or Schultze's sailer, is a butterfly in the family Nymphalidae. It is found in Nigeria (the Cross River loop), Cameroon and the western and central part of the Democratic Republic of the Congo. The habitat consists of primary forests.It may be conspecific with Neptis biafra. Nothing is known of its life history.

- Images BOLD

== Taxonomy ==
It is a member of the clarei sub-group of the nysiades group. The members of the clarei sub-group are

- Neptis camarensis
- Neptis nigra
- Neptis stellata
- Neptis viridis
- Neptis clarei
