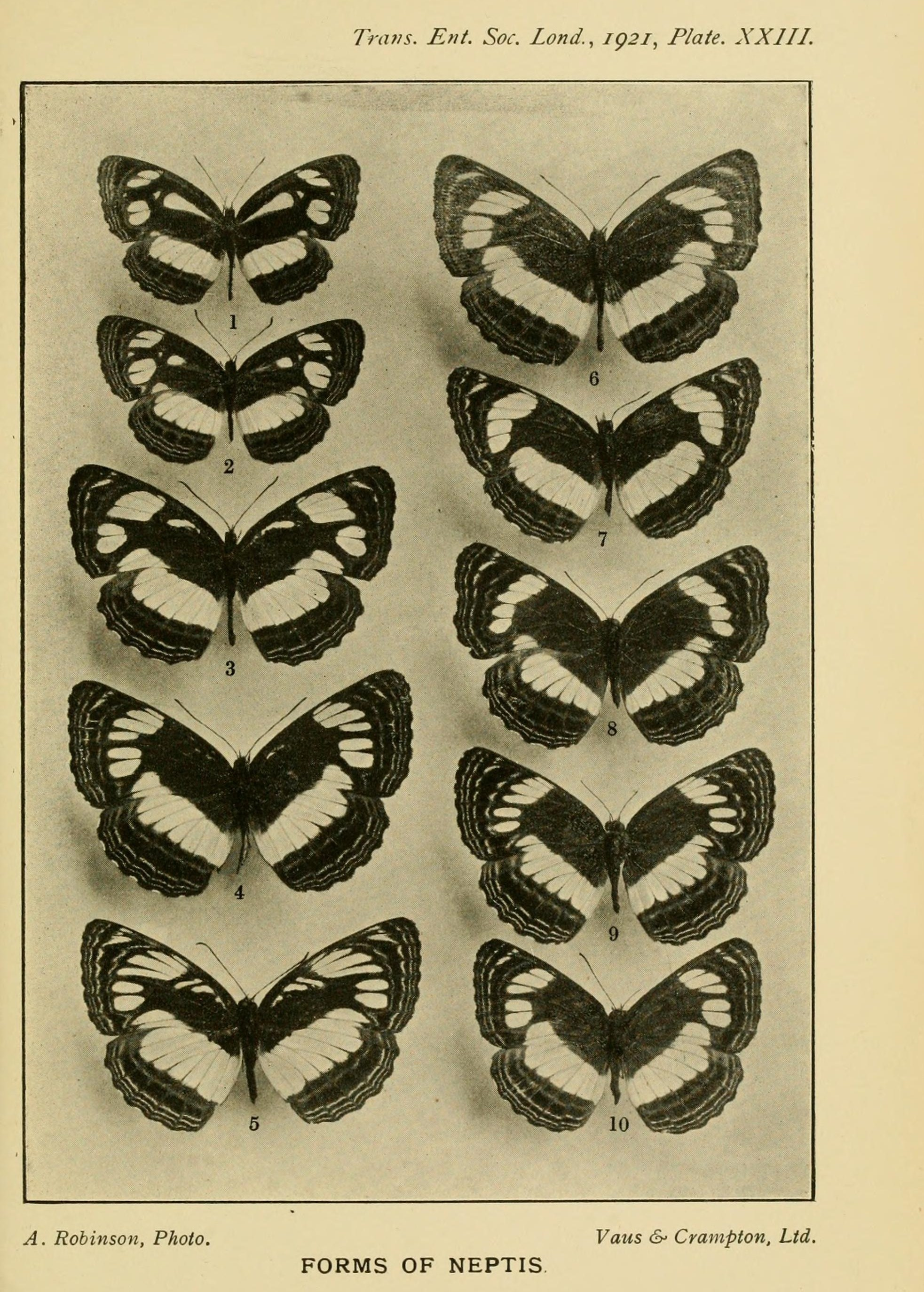
- Figure 8

Scientific classification
- Kingdom: Animalia
- Phylum: Arthropoda
- Class: Insecta
- Order: Lepidoptera
- Family: Nymphalidae
- Genus: Neptis
- Species: N. continuata

Binomial name
- Neptis continuata Holland, 1892

Synonyms
- Neptis biafra var. continuata Holland, 1892; Neptis conspicua ab. urungensis Strand, 1911

= Neptis continuata =

Species of butterfly

Neptis continuata, the continuous sailer, is a butterfly in the family Nymphalidae. It is found in eastern Nigeria, Cameroon, Gabon, the Republic of the Congo, the Democratic Republic of the Congo, western Uganda and possibly Sierra Leone. continuata Holland only differs [from Neptis clareiin having the discal band of the forewing continuous between vein 2 and the costal margin and the median band of the hindwing almost smooth distally, not incised at the veins. ab. urungensis Strand is said to differ from continuata in the cell of the forewing above bearing three white dots, while the marginal lines are more distinct. German East Africa: Kitungula.

== Taxonomy ==
It is the nominotypical member of the continuata sub-group Of the Neptis nysiades group (Species complex) The members of the subgroup are

- Neptis continuata
- Neptis mpassae
