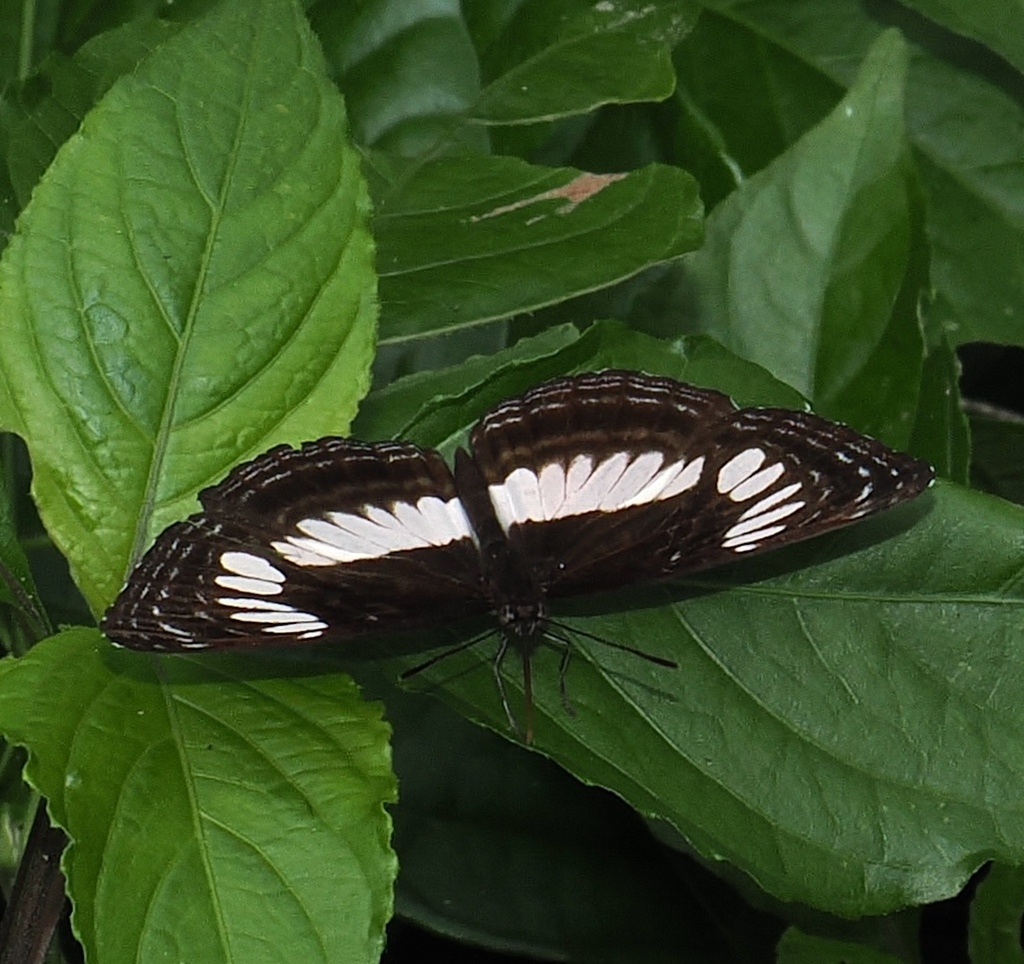

Scientific classification
- Kingdom: Animalia
- Phylum: Arthropoda
- Clade: Pancrustacea
- Class: Insecta
- Order: Lepidoptera
- Family: Nymphalidae
- Genus: Neptis
- Species: N. alta

Binomial name
- Neptis alta Overlaet, 1955

= Neptis alta =

Species of butterfly

Neptis alta, the old sailer or high sailer, is a butterfly in the family Nymphalidae. It is found in Senegal, Guinea, Sierra Leone, Liberia, Ivory Coast, Ghana, Nigeria, Cameroon, the Republic of the Congo, the southern part of the Democratic Republic of the Congo, Uganda, Kenya, Tanzania, Zambia, Malawi, Mozambique, Zimbabwe and northern Botswana.

Adult males mud-puddle in the dry season. Adults are on wing from August to October and again from April to May.

Torben Larsen developed a species numbering system for his 2005 publication Butterflies of West Africa. This species is #911. The 'Larsen' numbers have since been used with permission in A Sharp Eye on Butterflies of Ghana.

== Taxonomy ==
It is a member of the Neptis agatha species group and also of the rogersi sub-group of the nysiades group The members of the rogersi subgroup are

- Neptis rogersi
- Neptis collinsi
- Neptis seeldrayersi
- Neptis alta
