= Neptis mpassae =

Scientific classification
- Kingdom: Animalia
- Phylum: Arthropoda
- Class: Insecta
- Order: Lepidoptera
- Family: Nymphalidae
- Genus: Neptis
- Species: N. mpassae

Binomial name
- Neptis mpassae Pierre-Baltus, 2007

Species of butterfly

Neptis mpassae is a butterfly in the family Nymphalidae. It is found in Gabon.

== Taxonomy ==
It is in the continuata sub-group Of the Neptis nysiades group (Species complex) The members of the subgroup are

- Neptis continuata
- Neptis mpassae
