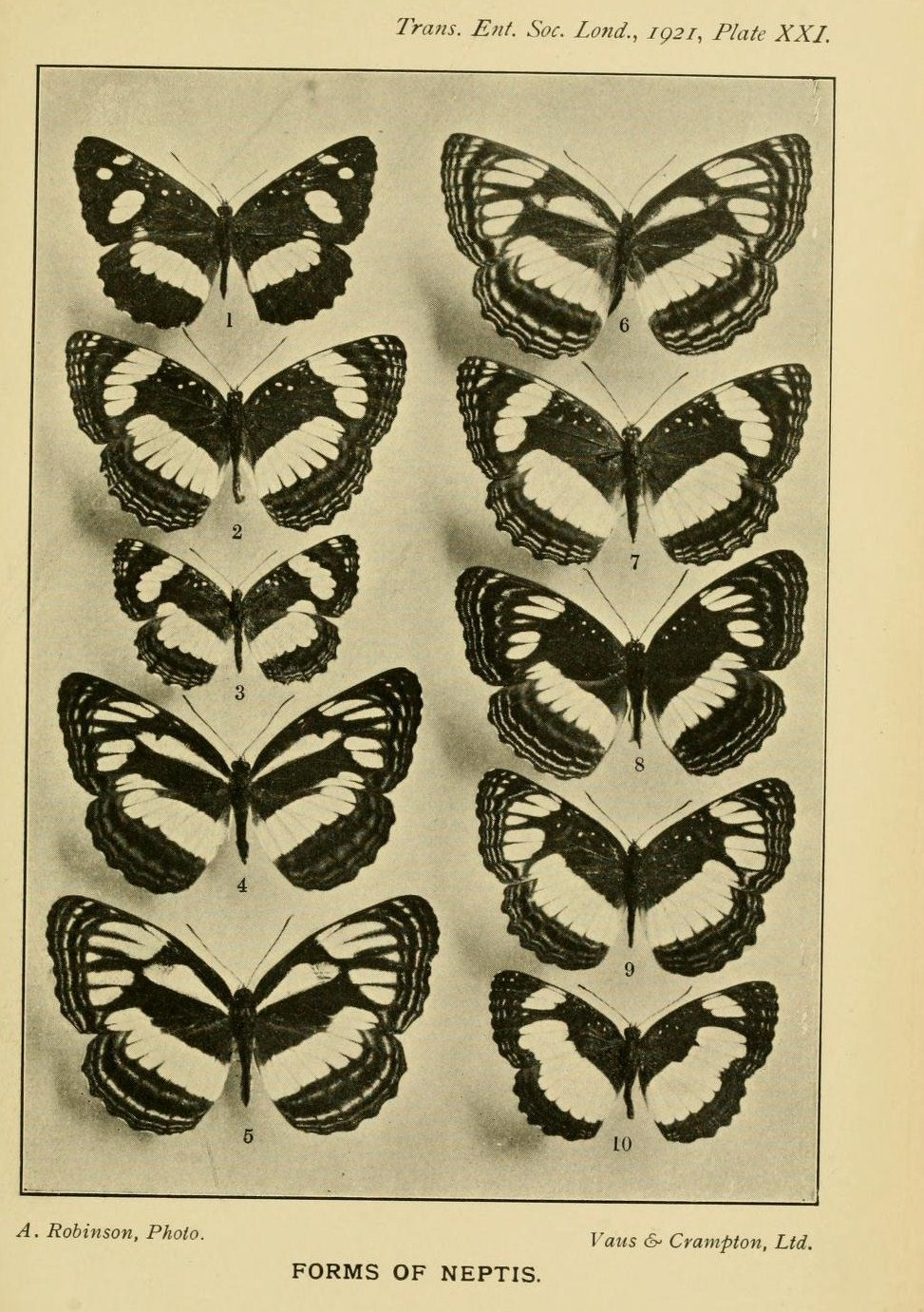
- Figure 9

Scientific classification
- Kingdom: Animalia
- Phylum: Arthropoda
- Class: Insecta
- Order: Lepidoptera
- Family: Nymphalidae
- Genus: Neptis
- Species: N. rogersi

Binomial name
- Neptis rogersi Eltringham, 1921

= Neptis rogersi =

Species of butterfly

Neptis rogersi is a butterfly in the family Nymphalidae. Images BOLD

It is found along the coasts of Kenya and Tanzania. The habitat consists of coastal forests.

The larvae feed on Paullinia pinnata and Alchornea cordifolia.

== Taxonomy ==
It is a member of the Neptis agatha species group and also the nominotypical member of the rogersi sub-group of the nysiades group The members of the rogersi subgroup are

- Neptis rogersi
- Neptis collinsi
- Neptis seeldrayersi
- Neptis alta
