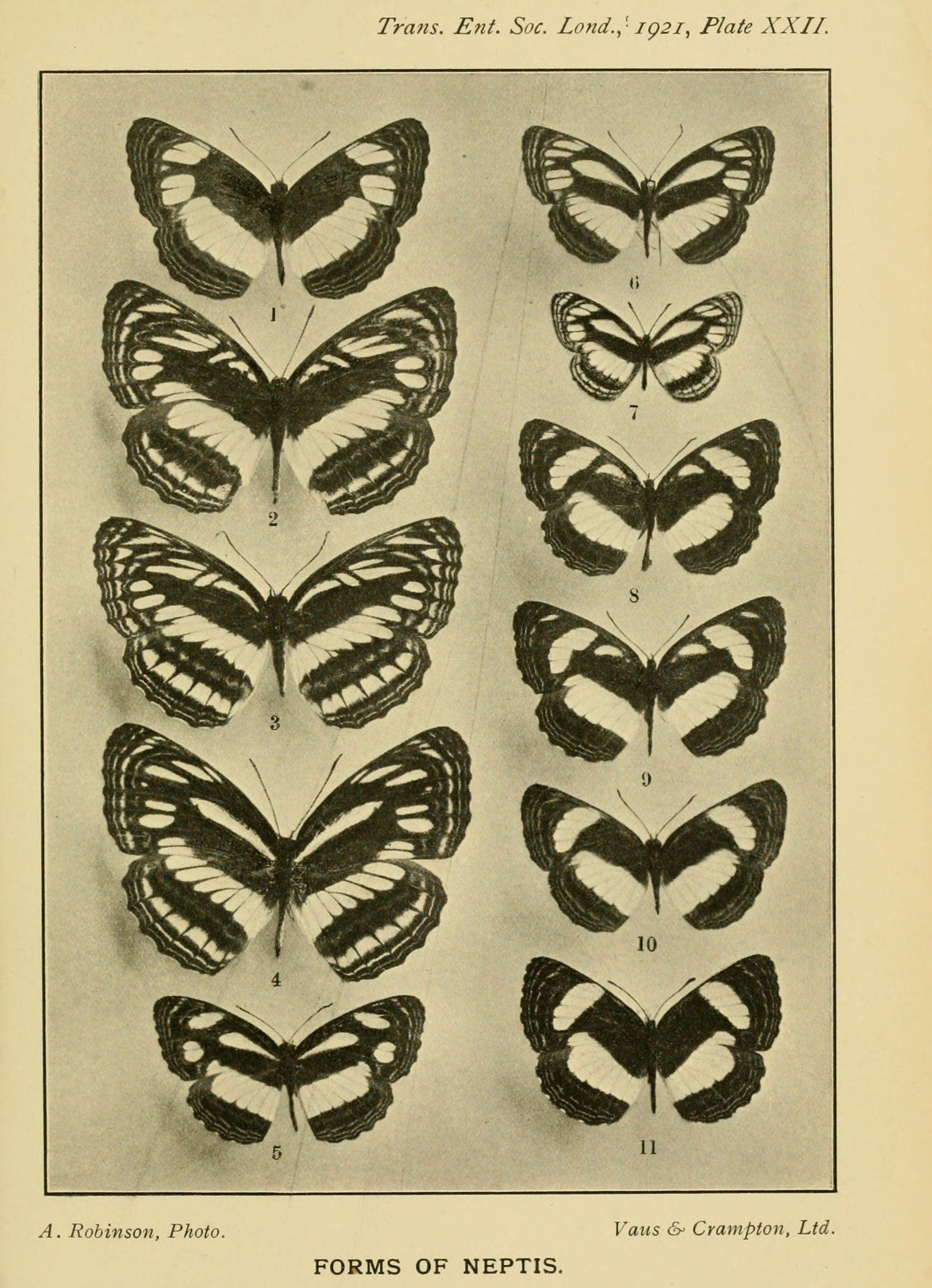
- Male, figure 1

Scientific classification
- Kingdom: Animalia
- Phylum: Arthropoda
- Clade: Pancrustacea
- Class: Insecta
- Order: Lepidoptera
- Family: Nymphalidae
- Genus: Neptis
- Species: N. trigonophora

Binomial name
- Neptis trigonophora Butler, 1878

Synonyms
- Neptis melicerta var. melicertula Strand, 1912; Neptis intermedia Schultze, 1920; Neptis trigonophora f. vansomereni Eltringham, 1929; Neptis trigonophora vansomereni d'Abrera, 1980

= Neptis trigonophora =

Species of butterfly

Neptis trigonophora, the barred sailer, is a butterfly of the family Nymphalidae. It is found in southern Africa.

Wingspan is 45–50 mm in males and 48–55 mm in females. Adults are on the wing possibly year round with peak from March to April.

The larvae feed on Paullinia pinnata.

== Subspecies ==
Recognised subspecies:

- Neptis trigonophora trigonophora (Kenya, eastern Tanzania, Malawi, Mozambique, eastern Zimbabwe, South Africa: Eastern Cape Province)
- Neptis trigonophora melicertula Strand, 1912 (Senegal, Sierra Leone, Liberia, Ivory Coast, Ghana, Nigeria, Cameroon, Gabon, Congo, Central African Republic, Democratic Republic of the Congo, Uganda, north-western Tanzania, northern Zambia)

Torben Larsen developed a species numbering system for his 2005 publication Butterflies of West Africa. The subspecies melicertula is #934. The 'Larsen' numbers have since been used with permission in A Sharp Eye on Butterflies of Ghana.

== Taxonomy ==
It is a member of the Neptis agatha species group. N. trigonophora Btlr. (48 e) is also near Neptis nysiades, but discal spot 4 of the forewing is small and triangular; the cell of the forewing is without markings above. German East Africa. Images BOLD
