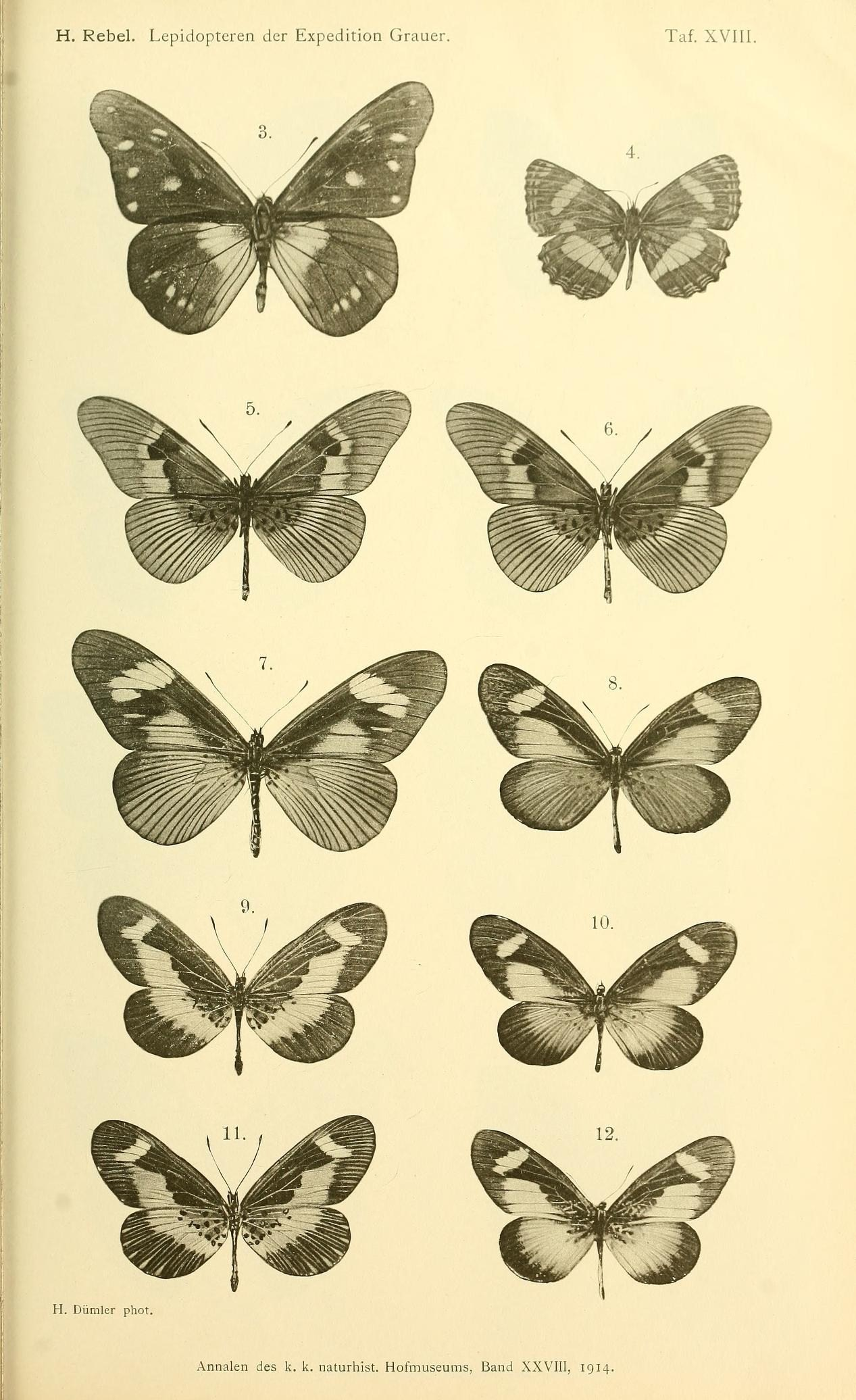
- Figure 4, plate accompanying the original description

Scientific classification
- Kingdom: Animalia
- Phylum: Arthropoda
- Class: Insecta
- Order: Lepidoptera
- Family: Nymphalidae
- Genus: Neptis
- Species: N. lugubris

Binomial name
- Neptis lugubris Rebel, 1914

= Neptis lugubris =

Species of butterfly

Neptis lugubris is a butterfly in the family Nymphalidae. It is found in south-western Uganda, Kenya and the eastern part of the Democratic Republic of the Congo.

It resembles a small example of Neptis agatha with much reduced white discal bands, and is described as having no white dot in forewing cell above or beneath. The state of the forewing. submarginal lines is not described, but from the photograph they would appear to be continuous. The locality is given as Lake Tanganyika. Only one example was received. Images BOLD The holotype was collected by Rudolf Grauer. It is in Naturhistorisches Museum Wien.

Very little is known about this butterfly.

== Taxonomy ==
It is the nominotypical member of the Neptis lugubris sub-group of the Neptis nysiades group The members of the subgroup are

- Neptis lugubris
- Neptis angelae
- Neptis paulinae
- Neptis biafra
