= Neptis stellata =

Scientific classification
- Kingdom: Animalia
- Phylum: Arthropoda
- Class: Insecta
- Order: Lepidoptera
- Family: Nymphalidae
- Genus: Neptis
- Species: N. stellata

Binomial name
- Neptis stellata Pierre-Baltus, 2007

Species of butterfly

Neptis stellata is a butterfly in the family Nymphalidae. It is found in Gabon.

It is a member of the clarei sub-group of the nysiades group. The members of the clarei sub-group are

- Neptis camarensis
- Neptis nigra
- Neptis stellata
- Neptis viridis
- Neptis clarei
