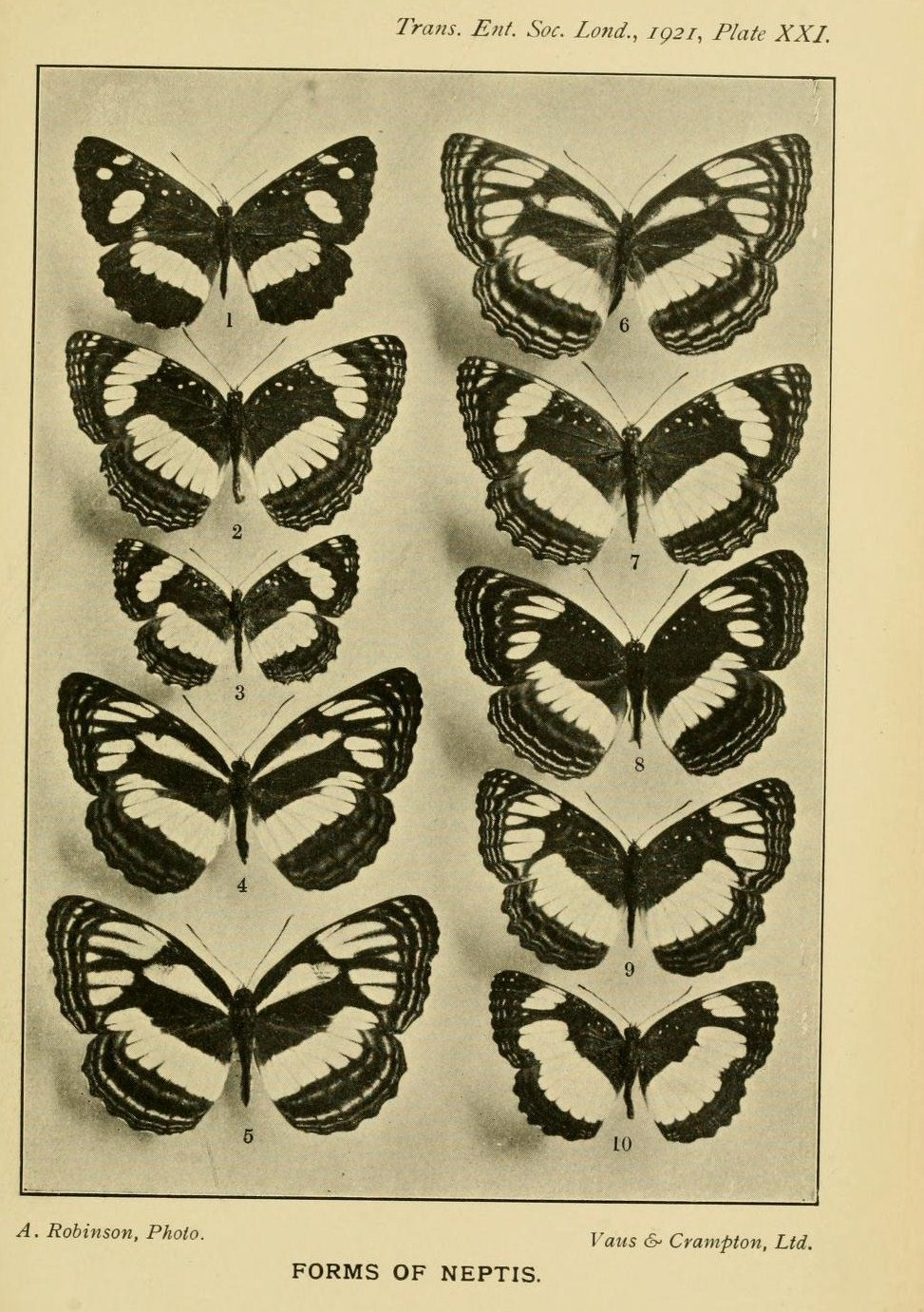
- Figures 7 and 8

Scientific classification
- Kingdom: Animalia
- Phylum: Arthropoda
- Class: Insecta
- Order: Lepidoptera
- Family: Nymphalidae
- Genus: Neptis
- Species: N. seeldrayersi

Binomial name
- Neptis seeldrayersi Aurivillius, 1895

Synonyms
- Neptis barnsi Eltringham, 1921

= Neptis seeldrayersi =

Species of butterfly

Neptis seeldrayersi, or Seeldrayer's sailer, is a butterfly in the family Nymphalidae. It is found in Ghana, Nigeria, Cameroon, the Republic of the Congo, the Democratic Republic of the Congo, Uganda, western Kenya and possibly Ivory Coast. The habitat consists of forests.

== Description ==
N. seeldrayersi Auriv. (48 d). The cell of the forewing above unicolorous or only with 2 or 3 minute white dots; the marginal lines are continuous, not interrupted in cellule 3 of the forewing; discal spots 4—6 on the forewing are long and narrow, distally somewhat diverging, and project further basally than spots 2 and 3; spots 3 and 4 are narrowly separated by the ground-colour; the median band of the hindwing is narrow, its proximal edge straight, its distal incised at the veins; the second marginal line on both wings beneath much thickened. The first marginal line of the forewing strongly incurved in 1 b, but not nearly reaching the middle of vein 2. Wing-expanse about 60 mm. Congo. It is very similar to Neptis nysiades.

== Taxonomy ==
It is a member of the rogersi sub-group of the nysiades group The members of the rogersi subgroup are

- Neptis rogersi
- Neptis collinsi
- Neptis seeldrayersi
- Neptis alta
