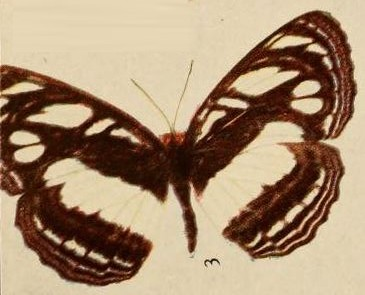

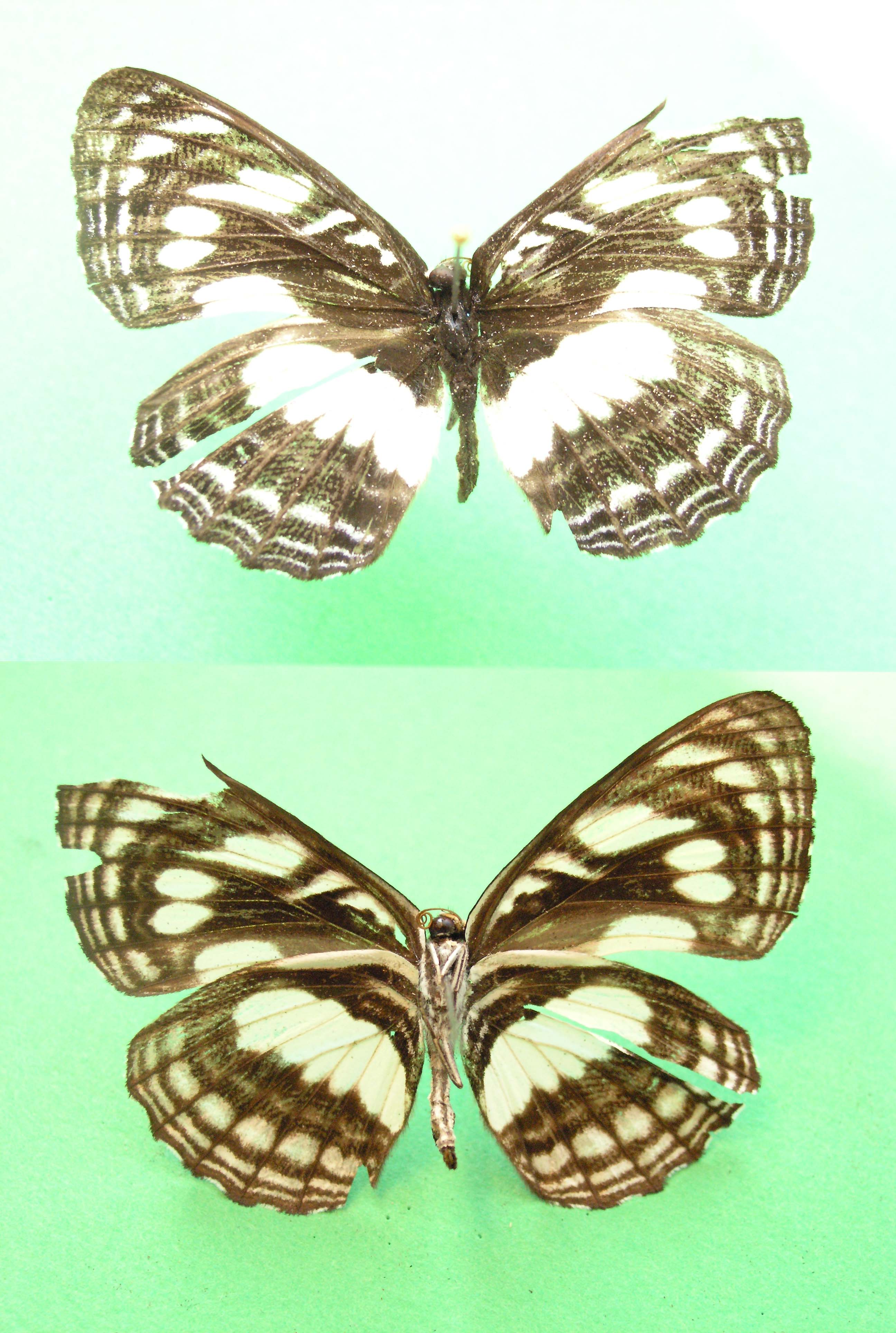

Scientific classification
- Kingdom: Animalia
- Phylum: Arthropoda
- Clade: Pancrustacea
- Class: Insecta
- Order: Lepidoptera
- Family: Nymphalidae
- Genus: Neptis
- Species: N. biafra

Binomial name
- Neptis biafra Ward, 1871

= Neptis biafra =

Species of butterfly

Neptis biafra, the Biafran sailer, is a butterfly in the family Nymphalidae. It is found in Nigeria (south and the Cross River loop) and western Cameroon.

== Original description ==
Male Upper-side: both wings brown-black; fore-wing, the cell crossed by three diagonal white marks, the outer one the largest, the inner one near the base the smallest; beyond the cell three parallel, horizontal, white streaks, the upper one the smallest, below, midway, two clear, oval, white spots: hind-wing, crossed midway by a broad band of white, this band is also continued slightly into the fore-wing; fringe of both wings white, following the outer margin of both wings four white bands, the first (from the margin) very narrow, second rather broader, third broad, especially on the hind-wing, fourth narrow and rather undulating on the hind-wing.Under-side : resembles upper-side, with the white markings generally broader. Expanse, 2,3; inches. Habitat: Camaroons.

== Taxonomy ==
It is a member of the Neptis lugubris sub-group of the Neptis nysiades group The members of the subgroup are

- Neptis lugubris
- Neptis angelae
- Neptis paulinae
- Neptis biafra
