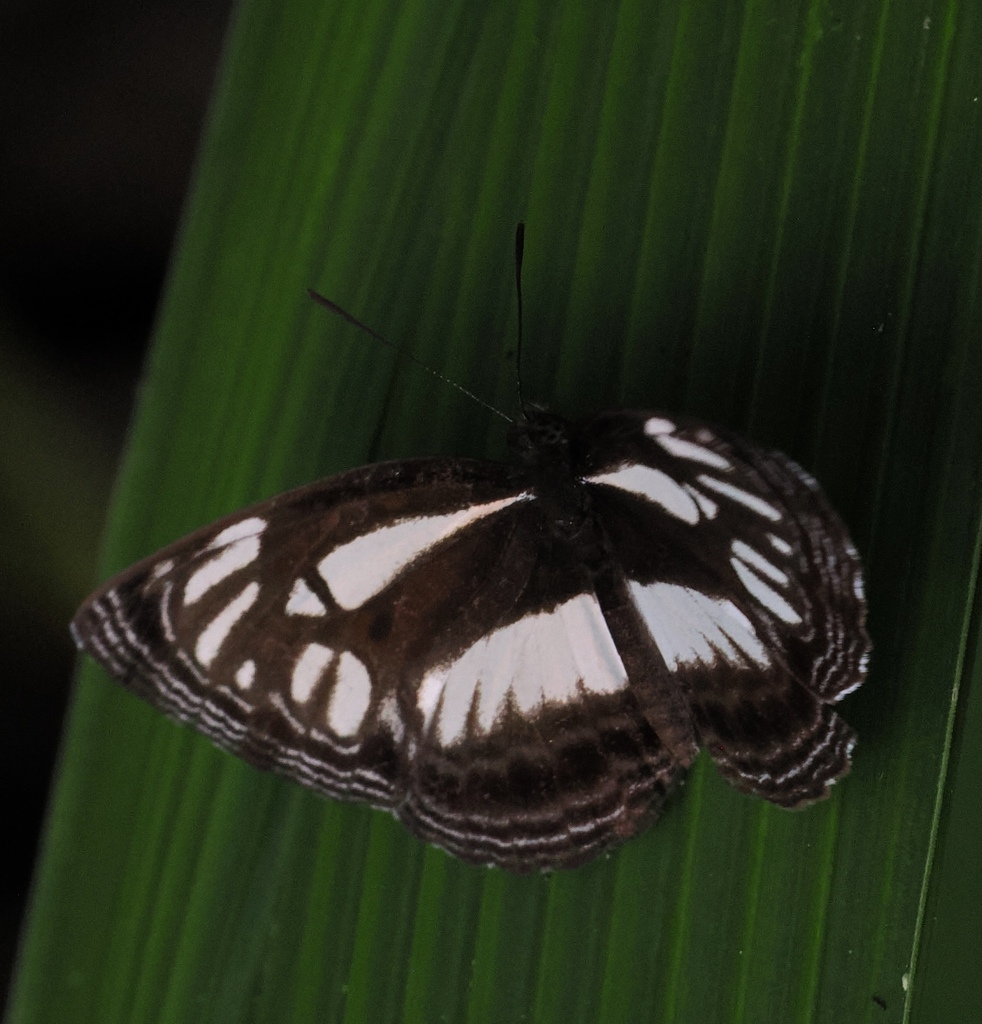

Scientific classification
- Kingdom: Animalia
- Phylum: Arthropoda
- Clade: Pancrustacea
- Class: Insecta
- Order: Lepidoptera
- Family: Nymphalidae
- Genus: Neptis
- Species: N. troundi

Binomial name
- Neptis troundi Pierre-Baltus, 1978

= Neptis troundi =

Species of butterfly

Neptis troundi, the constricted club-dot sailer, is a butterfly in the family Nymphalidae. It is found in Sierra Leone, Liberia, Ivory Coast, Ghana, Nigeria, Cameroon, Gabon, the Republic of the Congo and the western part of the Democratic Republic of the Congo. The habitat consists of forests.

The larvae feed on Paullinia pinnata, Grewia carpinifolia, Millettia (including Millettia zechiana) and Allophylus species.

Torben Larsen developed a species numbering system for his 2005 publication Butterflies of West Africa. This species is #938. The 'Larsen' numbers have since been used with permission in A Sharp Eye on Butterflies of Ghana.
