= Brenthia elongata =

Scientific classification
- Kingdom: Animalia
- Phylum: Arthropoda
- Clade: Pancrustacea
- Class: Insecta
- Order: Lepidoptera
- Family: Choreutidae
- Genus: Brenthia
- Species: B. elongata

Binomial name
- Brenthia elongata Heppner, 1985

Species of moth

Brenthia elongata is a moth of the family Choreutidae. It is known from Puerto Rico and the Virgin Islands.

The length of the forewings is about 4 mm for males and 3.5-3.7 mm for females.

The larvae possibly feed on Paullinia pinnata.
