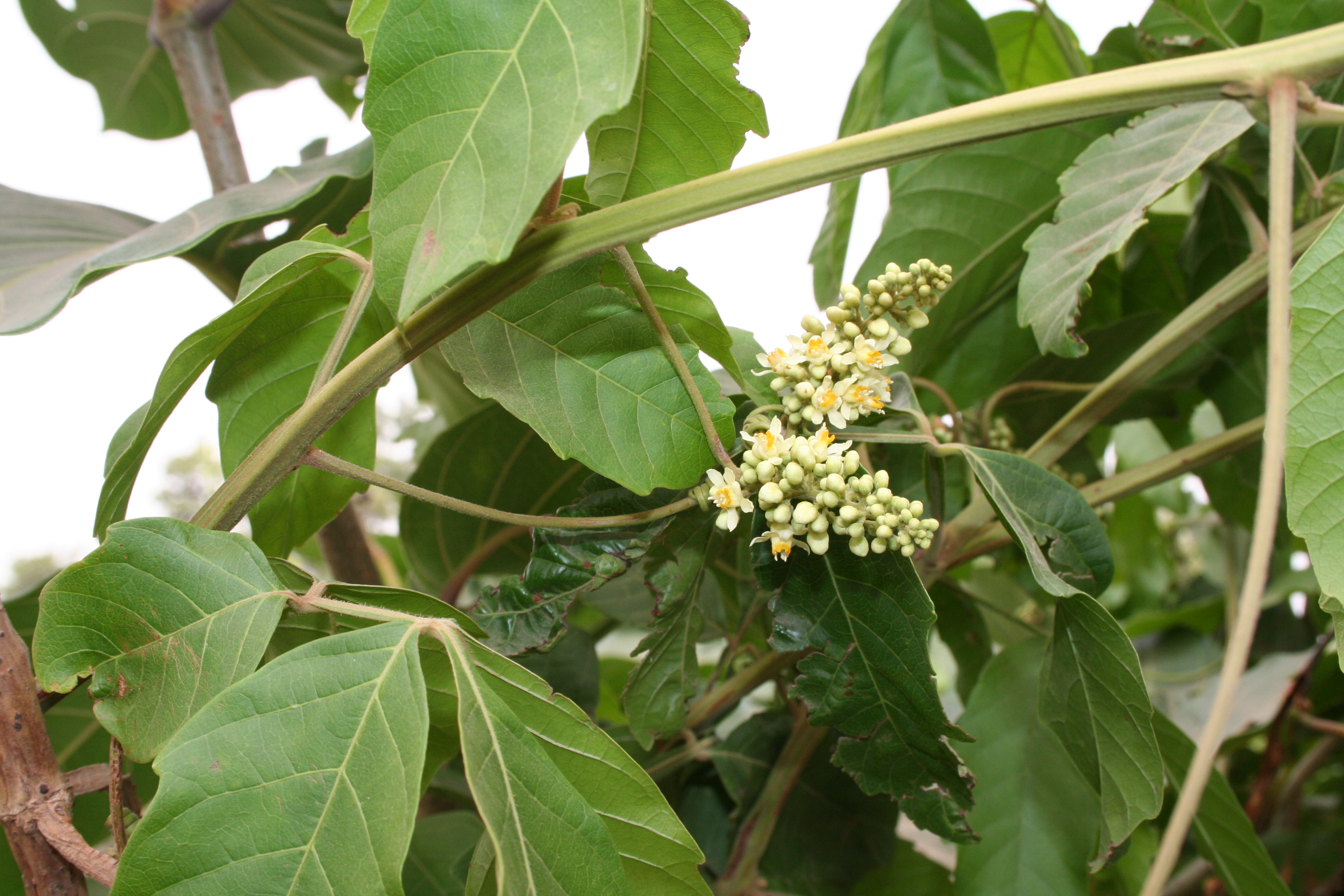
- inflorescences of Paullinia pinnata, near La Forêt classée de Patako, Senegal

Scientific classification
- Kingdom: Plantae
- Clade: Tracheophytes
- Clade: Angiosperms
- Clade: Eudicots
- Clade: Rosids
- Order: Sapindales
- Family: Sapindaceae
- Genus: Paullinia
- Species: P. pinnata

Binomial name
- Paullinia pinnata L.

= Paullinia pinnata =

Species of flowering plant

Paullinia pinnata is a flowering plant species in the genus of Paullinia found in South America and Africa.

The long flexible stems of P. pinnata are used to poison fish in shallow pools, as described by the English naturalist Henry Walter Bates in his book The Naturalist on the River Amazons.

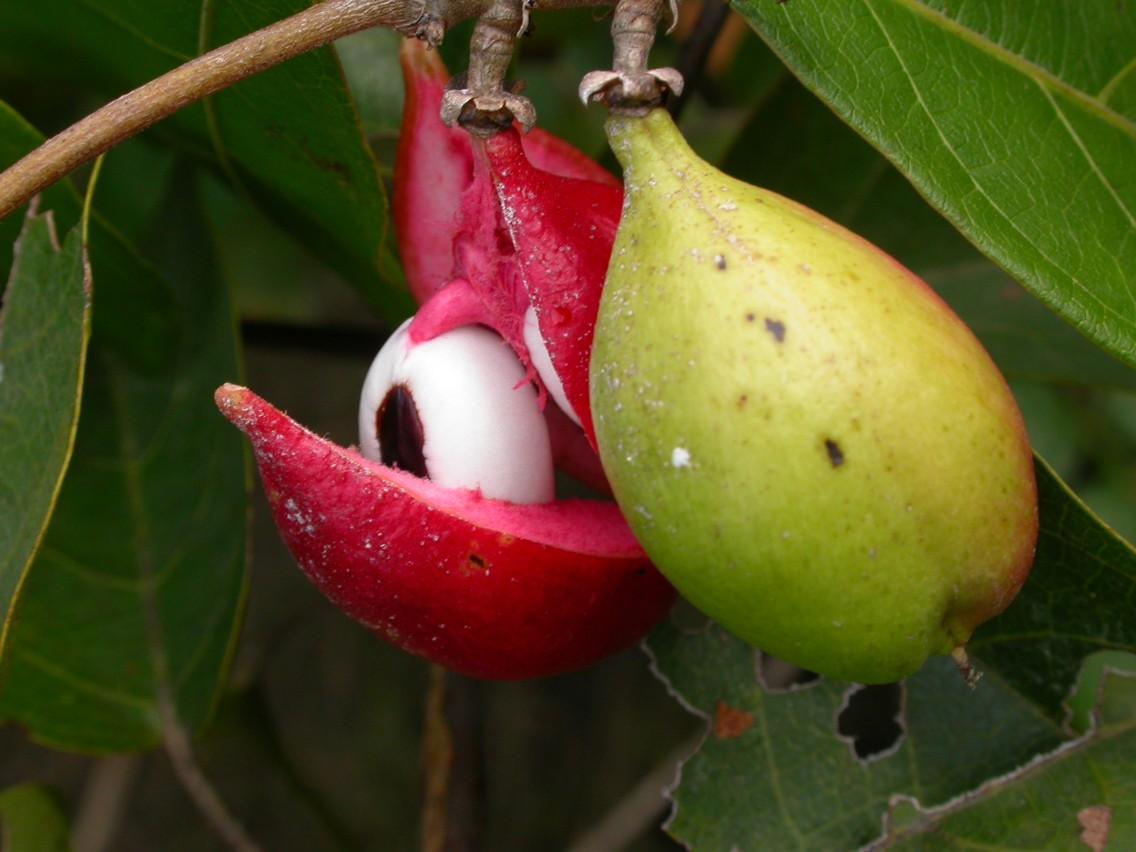
Fruits of Paullinia pinnata. Photo taken at the Nazinon river, Burkina Faso.

== Chemistry ==
The plant contains the ceramide paullinomide A, β-amyrin, steroids, the coumarinolignoid 2-(4-hydroxy-3,5-dimethoxyphenyl)-3-hydroxymethyl-2,3-dihydro-1,4,5-trioxaphenanthren-6-one, 5α-poriferastane-3ß,6α-diol and l-quebrachitol. It also contains the triterpenoids lupeyl steryl ether, 3-oxo-11α-hydroxyl-20(29)lupen and the lupeol-3-isovanniloyl ester paullinoyl (3-O-isovanilloyl-3R,5R,8R,9R,10R,13R,14S,17S,18R,19R-lup-20(29)-en), and the flavone glycosides diosmetin-7-O-(2‘ ‘-O-β-d-apiofuranosyl-6‘ ‘-acetyl-β-d-glucopyranoside) and tricetin-4‘-O-methyl-7-O-(2‘ ‘-O-β-d-apiofuranosyl-6‘ ‘-acetyl-β-d-glucopyranoside).

== Ecology ==
A number of lepidopteran larvae (Morpho polyphemus, Fresna nyassae, Neptis trigonophora, Brenthia elongata, Charaxes lycurgus, Charaxes zelica, Euphaedra medon, Euphaedra harpalyce, Neptis clarei, Neptis nysiades, Neptis rogersi, Neptis troundi) feed on P. pinnata.
