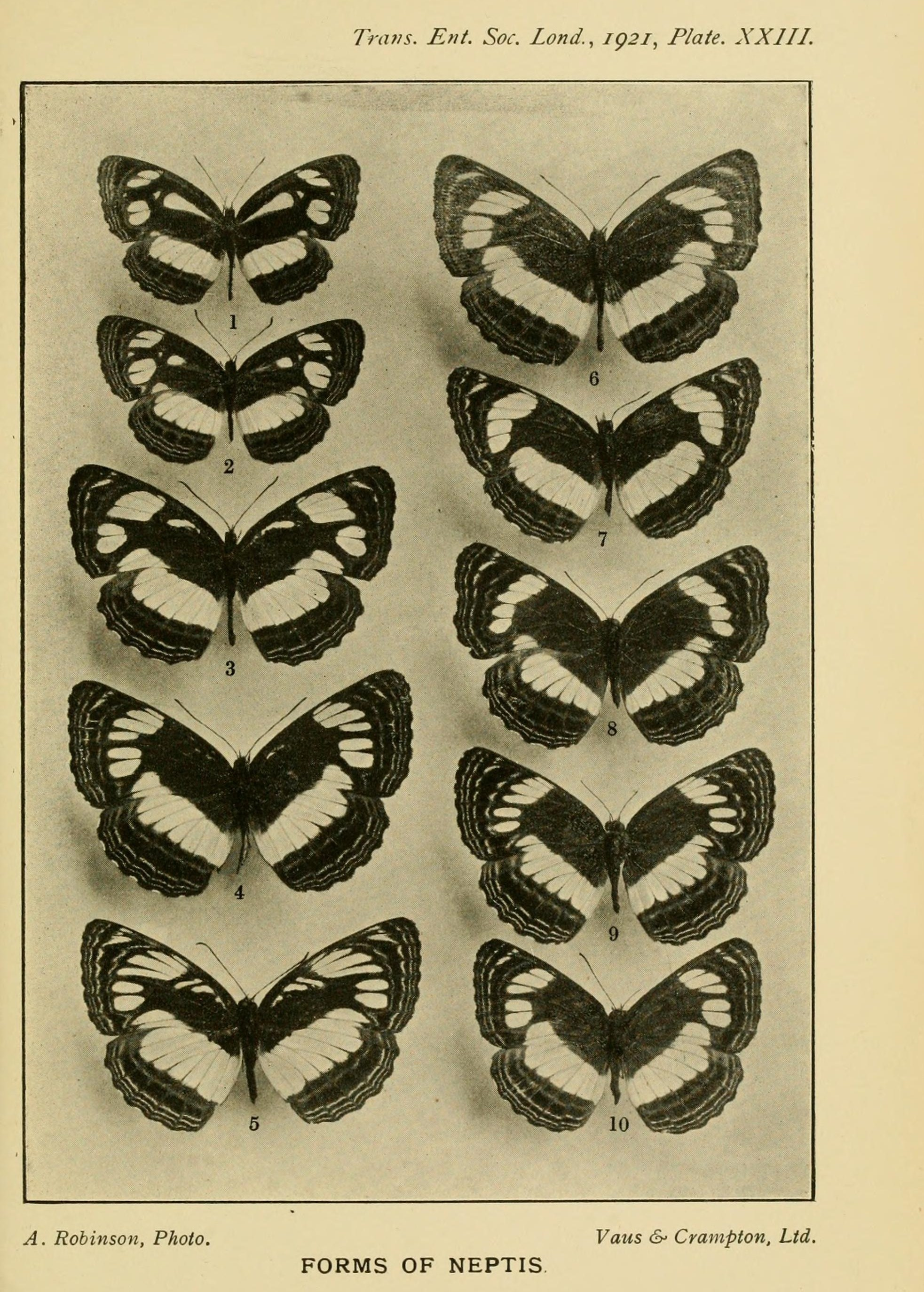
- Figure 6

Scientific classification
- Kingdom: Animalia
- Phylum: Arthropoda
- Class: Insecta
- Order: Lepidoptera
- Family: Nymphalidae
- Genus: Neptis
- Species: N. clarei

Binomial name
- Neptis clarei Neave, 1904

= Neptis clarei =

Species of butterfly

Neptis clarei, or Clare's sailer, is a butterfly in the family Nymphalidae. It is found in Uganda, western Kenya and possibly north-western Tanzania. The habitat consists of forests.

The larvae feed on Paullinia pinnata.

- Images BOLD

== Taxonomy ==
It is a member of the Neptis agatha species group — apparently only differs [from Neptis nysiades] in having the discal spot 6 on the forewing absent or very narrowly linear and spots 4 and 5 completely joined.Uganda.

It is also (in a different interpretation) the nominotypical member of the clarei sub-group of the nysiades group. The members of the clarei sub-group are

- Neptis camarensis
- Neptis nigra
- Neptis stellata
- Neptis viridis
- Neptis clarei
