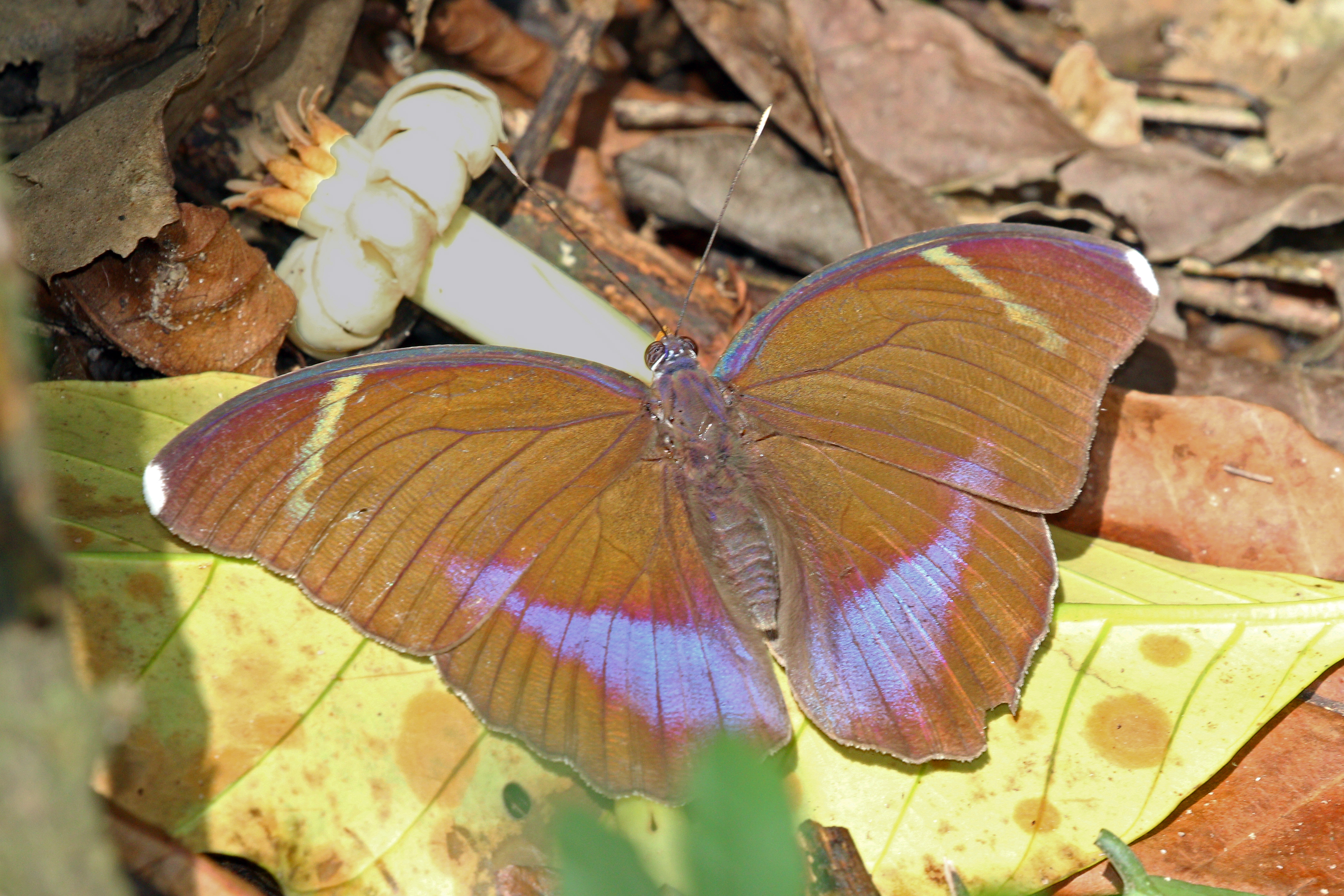
- female
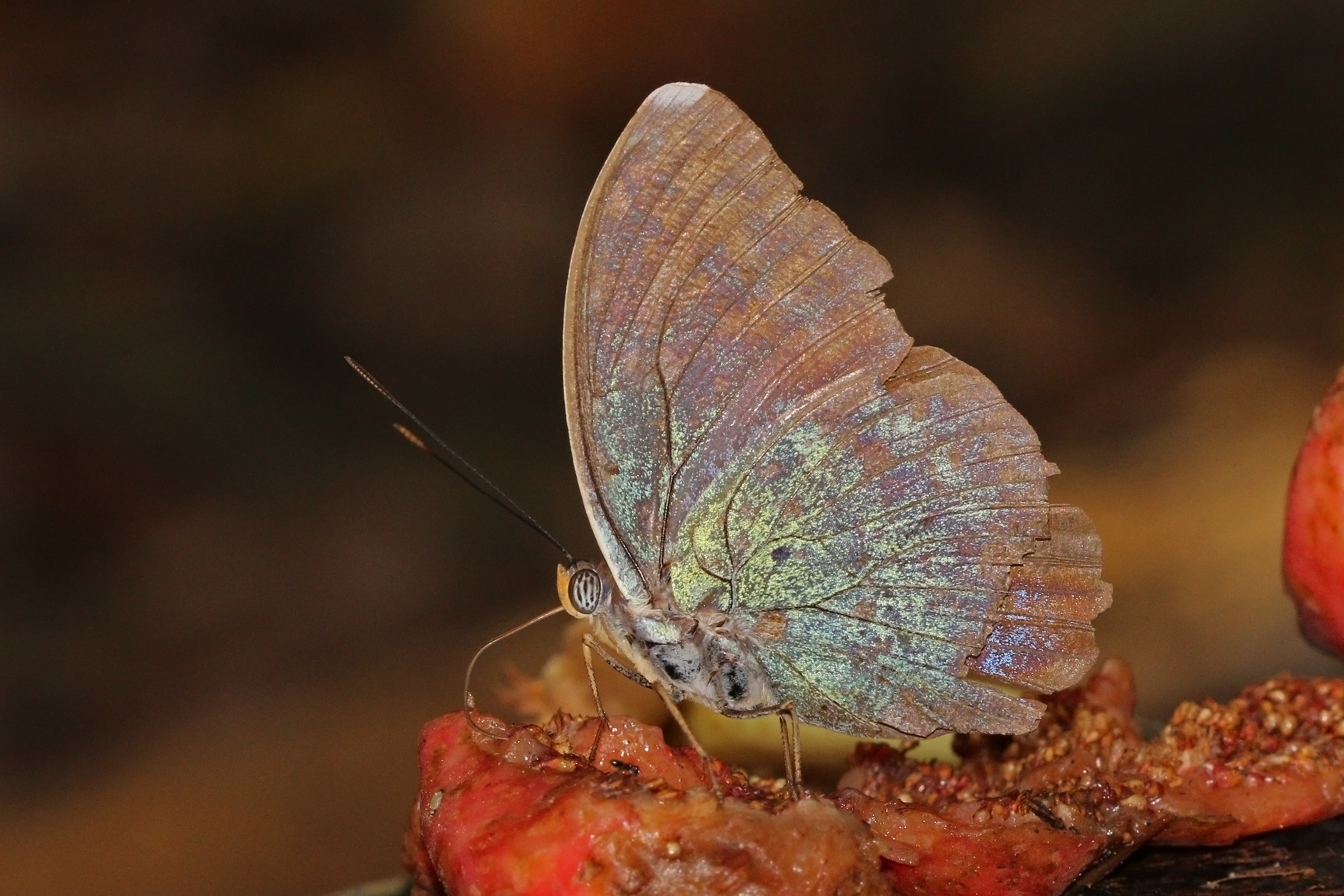
- male both E. p. harpalycein Kakum National park, Ghana'

Scientific classification
- Kingdom: Animalia
- Phylum: Arthropoda
- Clade: Pancrustacea
- Class: Insecta
- Order: Lepidoptera
- Family: Nymphalidae
- Genus: Euphaedra
- Species: E. harpalyce

Binomial name
- Euphaedra harpalyce (Cramer, 1777)

Synonyms
- Papilio harpalyce Cramer, 1777; Euphaedra (Euphaedrana) harpalyce; Romaleosoma lakuma Butler, 1870; Euphaedra harpalyce var. fasciata Staudinger, 1886; Romaleosoma spatiosa Mabille, 1876; Euphaedra losinga ab. impunctata Bartel, 1905; Euphaedra spatiosa ab. saphirina Neustetter, 1927; Euphaedra spatiosa ab. bipunctata Dufrane, 1933

= Euphaedra harpalyce =

Species of butterfly

Euphaedra harpalyce, the common blue-banded forester, is a butterfly in the family Nymphalidae. It is found in Guinea-Bissau, Guinea, Sierra Leone, Liberia, Ivory Coast, Ghana, Togo, Benin, Nigeria, Cameroon, Equatorial Guinea Gabon, the Central African Republic, Angola, the Democratic Republic of the Congo, Sudan, Uganda, Rwanda, Tanzania and Zambia.

== Description ==
E. harpalyce Cr. Both wings above uniform black-brown, with small white apical spot on the forewing and a bright blue transverse band on the hindwing, which is broad at the anal angle, anteriorly becoming narrower terminates at vein 6 or 7 and is sometimes continued more or less far on the forewing also. The under surface is rather uniform light green or grey-green with 1–3 black dots in the cells. In the type-form the subapical band of the forewing is entirely absent in the male and very narrow and yellowish in the female. Sierra Leone to Cameroons. In ab. lakuma Btlr. the subapical band of the forewing is very narrow in the male but in the female 4–5 mm. in breadth.

E. spatiosa Mab.[synonym and subspecies of harpalyce] Both wings above uniform dark olive-brown, in the apical half of the fore wing blackish with yellow subapical band and white apical spot. The under surface is green with one black dot (occasionally 2 or 3) in the cells and two dull, dark, not very distinct transverse bands beyond the middle; the subapical band of the forewing only shows through faintly. The female may attain an expanse of 100 mm. and is the largest of all the Euphaedra species. Cameroons to the Congo and Uganda.

== Biology ==
The habitat consists of lowland forests, riparian forests and secondary forests.

Both sexes are attracted to fermenting fruit.

The larvae feed on Phialodiscus unijugatus, Paullinia pinnata, Blighia sapida, Lecaniodiscus cupanioides, Deinbollia fulvotomentella, Blighia unijugata and Allophylus species.

== Subspecies ==
- E. h. harpalyce (Guinea-Bissau, Guinea, Sierra Leone, Liberia, Ivory Coast, Ghana, Togo, Benin, Nigeria, western Cameroon)
- E. h. dowsetti Hecq, 1990 (Rwanda)
- E. h. evanescens Hecq, 1995 (Nigeria: Mambilla Plateau)
- E. h. serena Talbot, 1928 (Democratic Republic of the Congo: Shaba, Zambia)
- E. h. spatiosa (Mabille, 1876) (Cameroon, Gabon, Central African Republic, Angola, Democratic Republic of the Congo, Uganda, north-western Tanzania)
- E. h. sudanensis Talbot, 1929 (southern Sudan, northern Uganda)
- E. h. vana Hecq, 1991 (Bioko)

Torben Larsen developed a species numbering system for his 2005 publication Butterflies of West Africa. The nominate subspecies is #1118. The 'Larsen' numbers have since been used with permission in A Sharp Eye on Butterflies of Ghana.

== Gallery ==
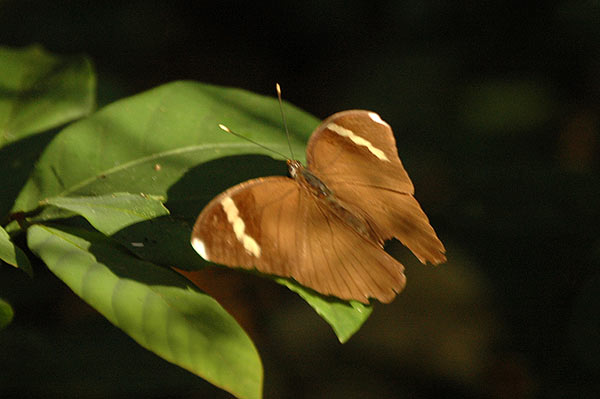
E. h. spatiosa

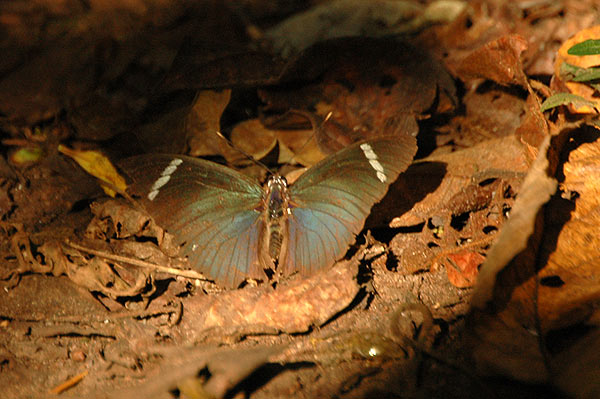
E. h. spatiosa

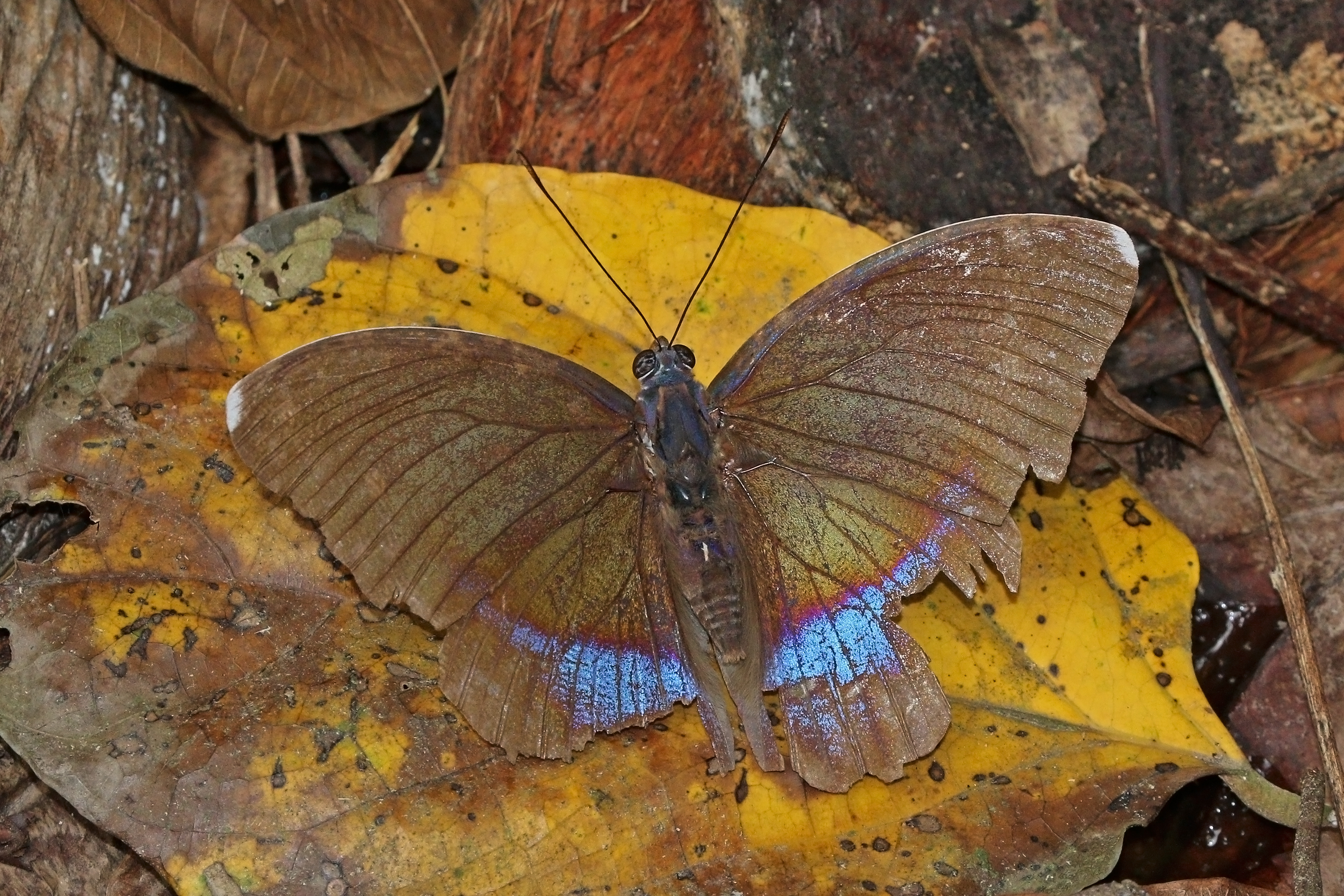
male E. p. palyce
Kakum National park, Ghana

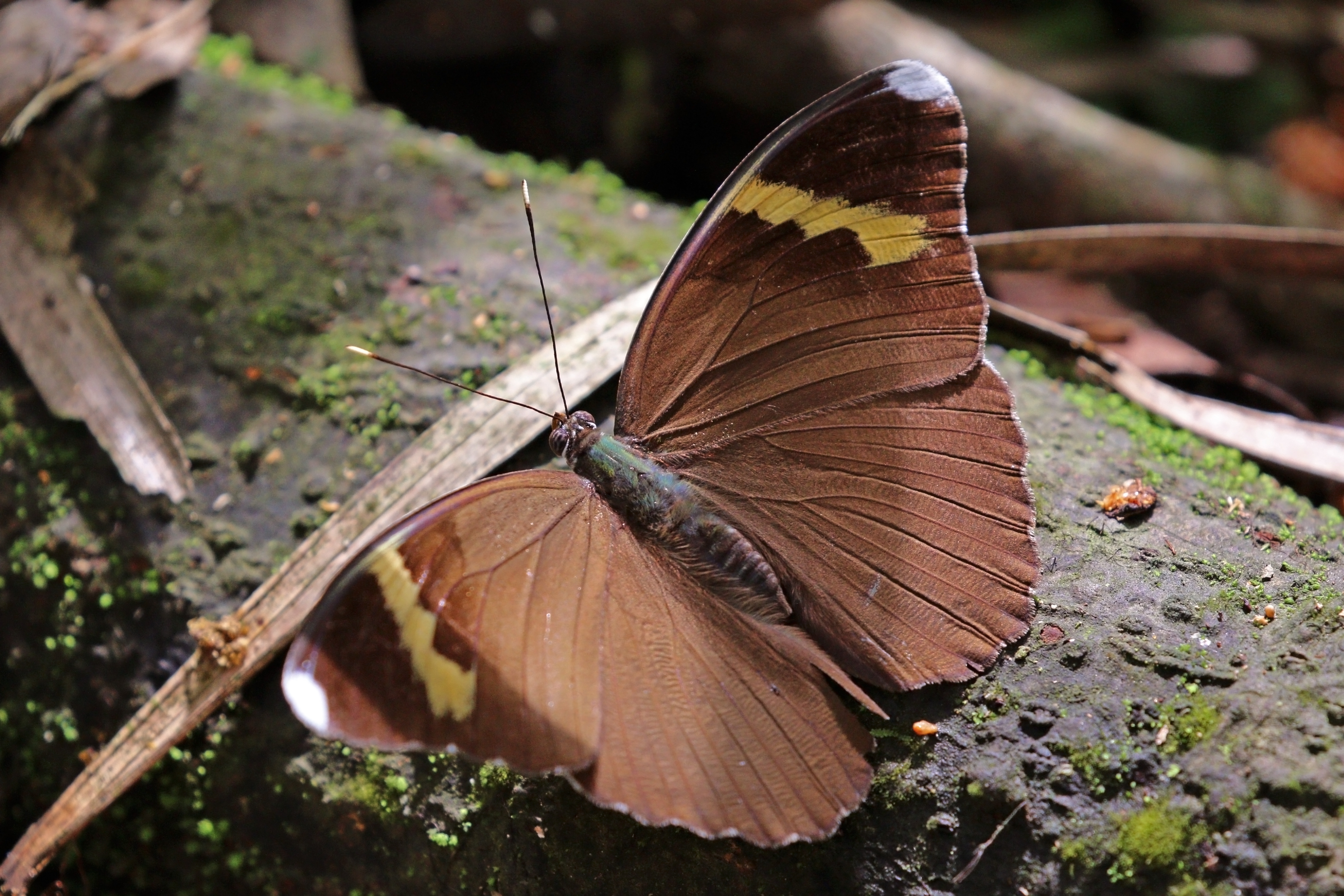
female E. h. spatiosa
Kibale National Park, Uganda
