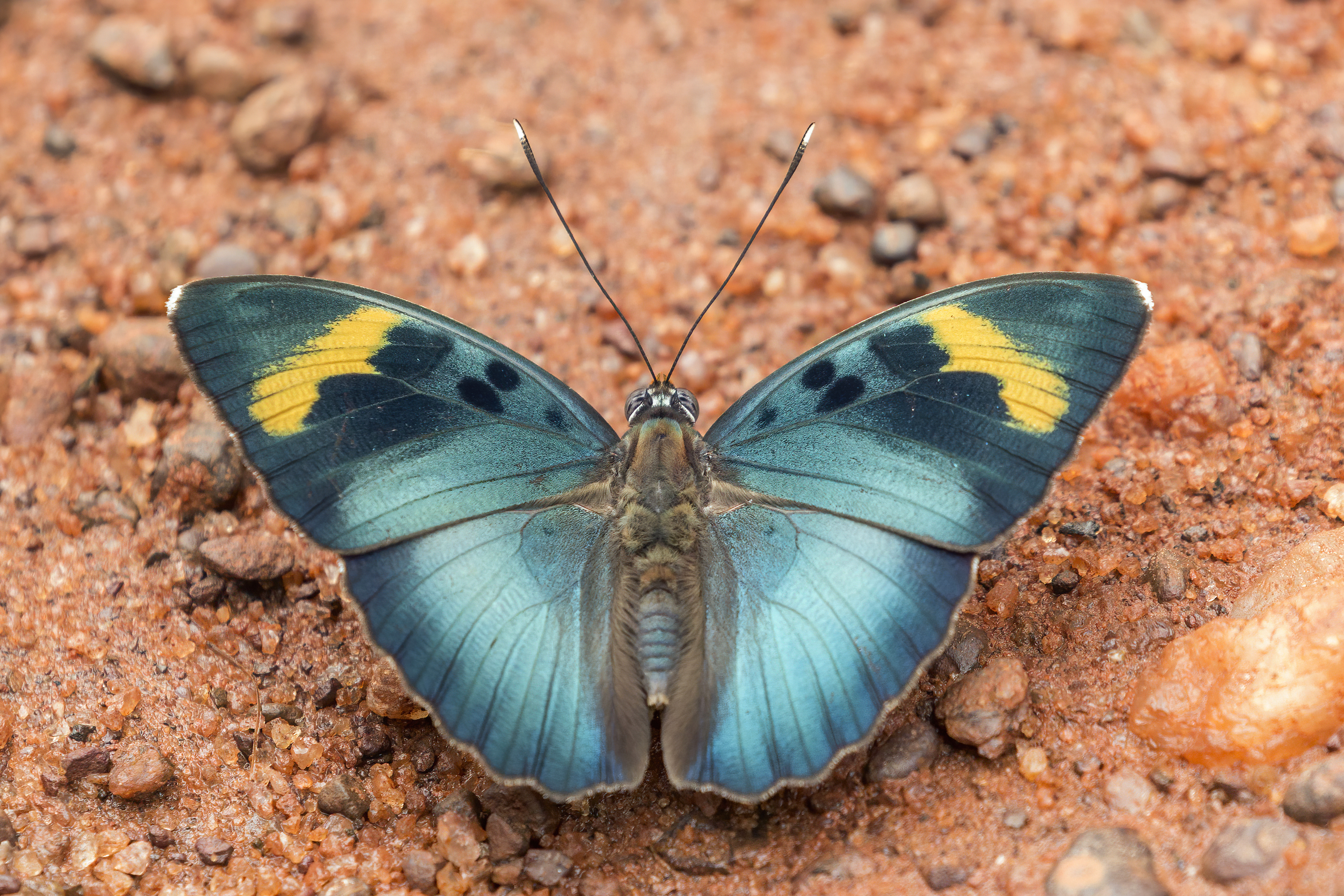
- Male
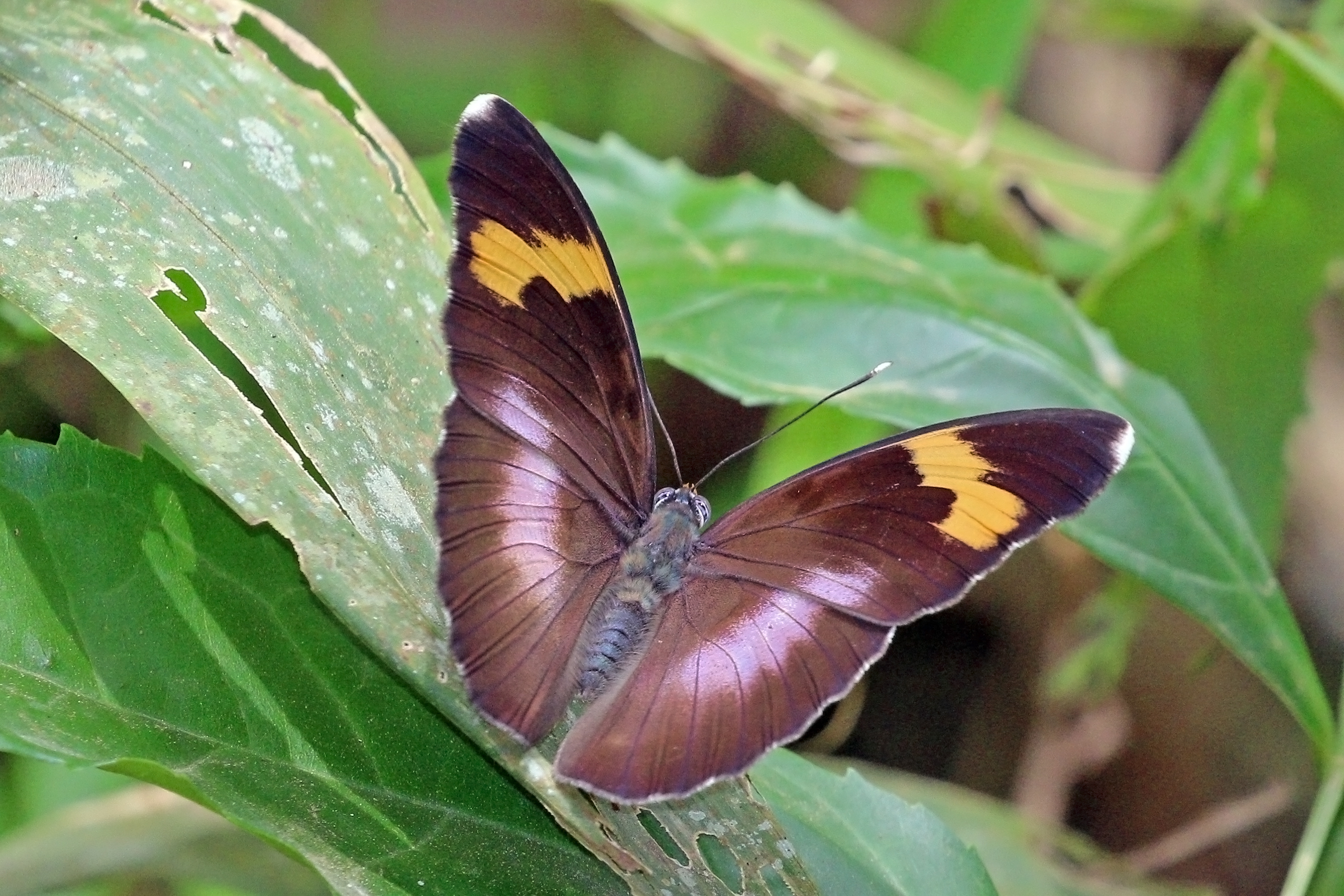
- Female both E. m. medon Bobiri Forest, Ghana

Scientific classification
- Kingdom: Animalia
- Phylum: Arthropoda
- Clade: Pancrustacea
- Class: Insecta
- Order: Lepidoptera
- Family: Nymphalidae
- Genus: Euphaedra
- Species: E. medon

Binomial name
- Euphaedra medon (Linnaeus, 1763)

Synonyms
- Papilio medon Linnaeus, 1763; Euphaedra (Medoniana) medon; Papilio janassa Linnaeus, 1764; Romalaeosoma agnes Butler, 1866; Euphaedra medon ab. fernanda Fruhstorfer, 1903; Euphaedra medon var. innotata Holland, 1920; Romaleosoma viridinota Butler, 1871; Euphaedra medon ab. fraudata Thurau, 1904; Euphaedra medon neustetteri f. interpreta Niepelt, 1915; Euphaedra medon var. aequata Gaede, 1916; Euphaedra medon innotata ab. hollandi Dufrane, 1945; Euphaedra medon innotata ab. bipunctata Dufrane, 1945; Euphaedra medon innotata ab. alberici Dufrane, 1945; Euphaedra peculiaris Lathy, 1906; Euphaedra medon var. albula Thurau, 1904

= Euphaedra medon =

Species of butterfly

Euphaedra medon, the widespread forester, is a butterfly in the family Nymphalidae. It is found in Senegal, the Gambia, Guinea-Bissau, Guinea, Sierra Leone, Liberia, Ivory Coast, Ghana, Togo, Benin, Nigeria, Cameroon, Equatorial Guinea, Gabon, the Republic of Congo, Angola, the Democratic Republic of the Congo, Sudan, Ethiopia, Uganda, Kenya, Tanzania and Zambia.

== Description ==
E. medon was the first known species of Euphaedra and was described by Linne as long ago as 1763. It is rather variable in colouring, particularly the female and recalls some forms of the ceres group. In the male both wings are glossy green or bluish above, but at the distal margin more or less broadly blackish; the forewing is also broadly black inside the subapical band and has 2 or 3 black spots in the cell; the subapical band of the forewing is broad and reaches vein 3; beneath both wings are green with dark green submarginal band, 3 large black spots in the cell and a white median band on the hindwing, often broken up into spots or even indistinct; above the apex of the forewing has white fringes, but no spot. The female is much larger and has a white apical spot on the forewing and a very broad dark brown or blackish marginal band on the hindwing. - medon L. In the male the hindwing is uniform green or bluish above and the subapical band of the forewing yellow, or light bluish tinged with green and in the female the hindwing almost from the base to beyond the middle and the hindmargin of the forewing are bright blue-green or bluish; the subapical band of the forewing is bright yellow. Sierra Leone to Angola. - female f. agnes Btlr. differs in having the hindwing and the hindmargin of the forewing violet-brown above, with a light blue or violet-blue median band about 7 mm. in breadth; the subapical band on the upperside of the forewing is yellow or white. Sierra Leone to Cameroons. ab. viridinotata Btlr. has in the middle of the hindwing above a large greenish yellow spot in the green or bluish area. Gaboon and Congo. - female ab. fernanda Fruhst. differs from viridinotata in the larger white apical spot of the forewing and the much narrower yellow subapical band; the under surface is darker than in viridinotata, the white median band is more sharply expressed and the black submarginal band much widened. Fernando Po. ab. albula Thurau has in both sexes a white subapical band on the upperside of the forewing and the under surface is clay-yellow; in the female the upperside is chocolate-brown with violet reflection; the hindmarginal area of the forewing as far as vein 2 and the median area of the hindwing are bluish violet . Guinea. As fraudata Thurau describes a male from Uganda as follows: - The subapical band of the forewing is strikingly narrow, at the costal margin only about 2 mm. in breadth, at the constriction on vein 4 about 1 mm.

== Biology ==
The habitat consists of forests and riverine vegetation.

The larvae feed on Phialodiscus unijugatus, Deinbollia fulvotomentella, Paullinia pinnata, Phialodiscus zambesiacus and Allophylus species

== Subspecies ==
- E. m. medon (Liberia, Ivory Coast, Ghana, Togo, Benin, Nigeria, Cameroon)
- E. m. abouna Ungemach, 1932 (south-western Ethiopia)
- E. m. celestis Hecq, 1986 (Gabon, Congo, Angola, southern Democratic Republic of the Congo)
- E. m. innotata Holland, 1920 (Democratic Republic of the Congo, Tanzania: Kigoma and Mpanda)
- E. m. fernanda Hecq, 1981 (Bioko)
- E. m. fraudata van Someren, 1935 (Sudan, Uganda, western Kenya)
- E. m. inaequabilis Thurau, 1904 (Uganda, western Kenya)
- E. m. neustetteri Niepelt, 1915 (Cameroon, Democratic Republic of the Congo, Kenya, Tanzania, Zambia)
- E. m. pholus (van der Hoeven, 1840) (Senegal, Gambia, Guinea-Bissau, Guinea, Sierra Leone)
- E. m. sanctanna Hecq, 1985 (Gabon)
- E. m. viridinota (Butler, 1871) (Gabon)

Torben Larsen developed a species numbering system for his 2005 publication Butterflies of West Africa. The nominate subspecies is #1046. The 'Larsen' numbers have since been used with permission in A Sharp Eye on Butterflies of Ghana.

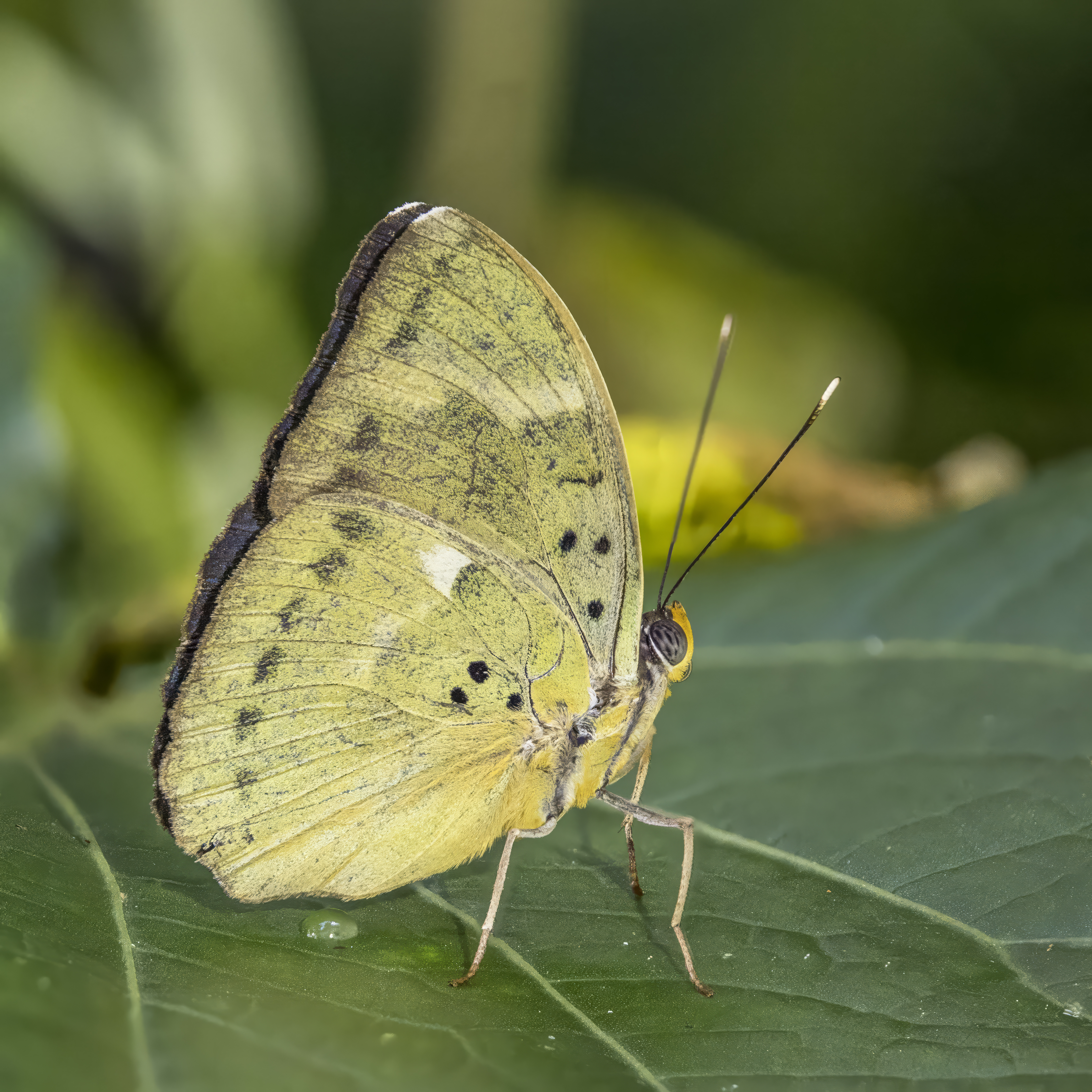
male E. m. medon
Nyamebe Bepo Forest Reserve, Ghana
