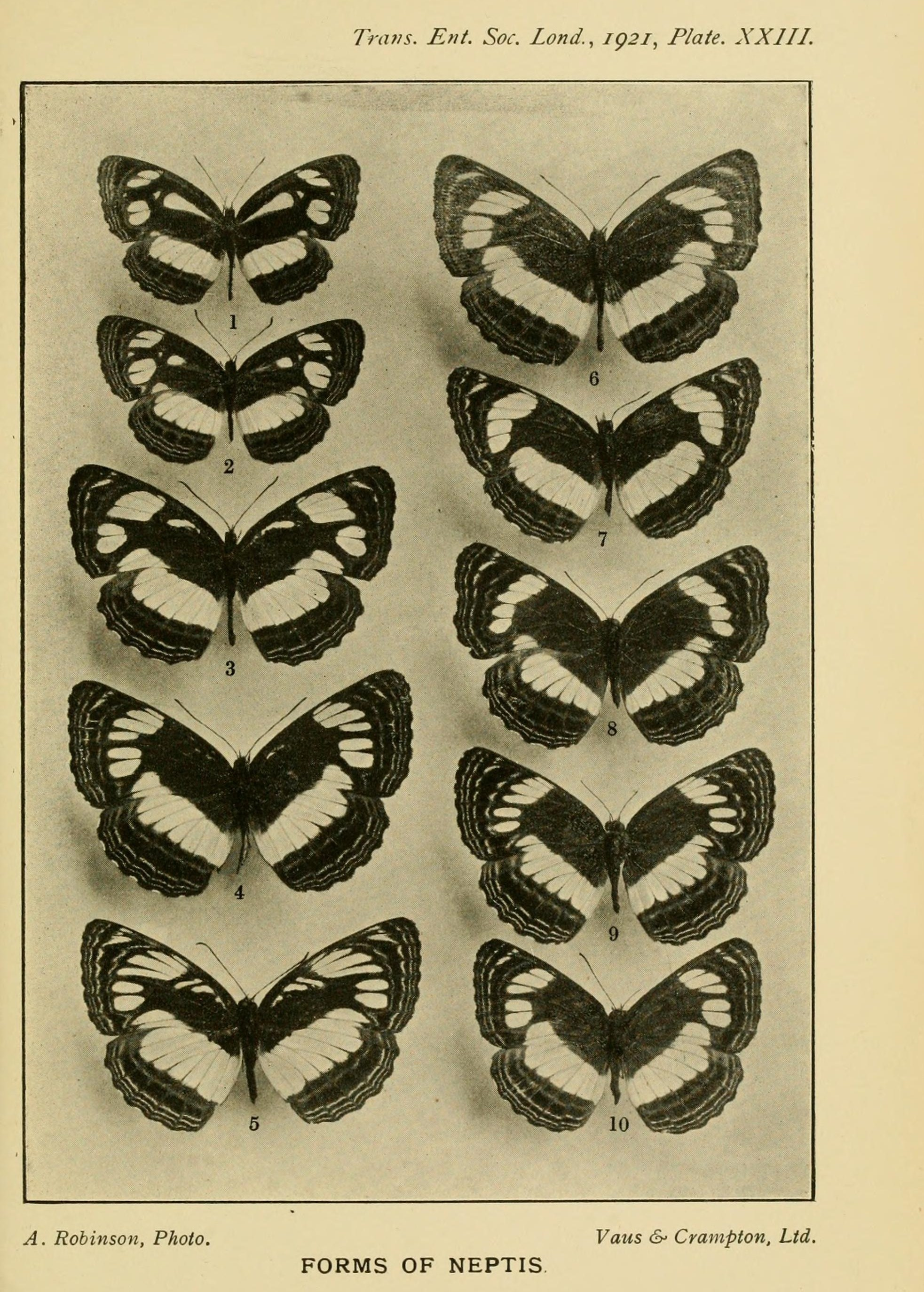
- Figure 4 (male) and 5 (female)

Scientific classification
- Kingdom: Animalia
- Phylum: Arthropoda
- Class: Insecta
- Order: Lepidoptera
- Family: Nymphalidae
- Genus: Neptis
- Species: N. nysiades

Binomial name
- Neptis nysiades Hewitson, 1868

= Neptis nysiades =

Species of butterfly

Neptis nysiades, the variable sailer, is a butterfly in the family Nymphalidae. It is found in Senegal, Guinea-Bissau, Sierra Leone, Liberia, Ghana, Togo, Nigeria, Cameroon, the Republic of the Congo, Angola and Zambia. The habitat consists of forests, including riparian forests.

== Description ==
N. nysiades Hew. (48 e) agrees almost entirely in the markings with Neptis seeldrayersi, but is smaller, with an expanse of 44—48 mm., and can be most certainly distinguished by the first marginal line on the upperside of the forewing forming in cellule 1 b an acute angle proximad, which reaches the middle of vein 2; discal spots 3 and 4 on the forewing are more or less broadly separated. [then] Old Calabar to Angola.

The larvae feed on Paullinia pinnata.

== Taxonomy ==
It is a member of the Neptis agatha species group
